= Board of Intermediate and Secondary Education =

Board of Intermediate and Secondary Education may refer to the following:

== Bangladesh ==
=== General Education Board ===
- Board of Intermediate and Secondary Education, Rajshahi
- Board of Intermediate and Secondary Education, Dhaka
- Board of Intermediate and Secondary Education, Cumilla
- Board of Intermediate and Secondary Education, Jashore
- Board of Intermediate and Secondary Education, Chattogram
- Board of Intermediate and Secondary Education, Barisal
- Board of Intermediate and Secondary Education, Sylhet
- Board of Intermediate and Secondary Education, Dinajpur
- Board of Intermediate and Secondary Education, Mymensingh
- Board of Intermediate and Secondary Education, Faisalabad

=== Specialized Education Boards ===
- Bangladesh Madrasah Education Board
- Bangladesh Technical Education Board

== Pakistan ==
=== Islamabad ===
- Federal Board of Intermediate and Secondary Education

=== Khyber Pakhtunkhwa ===
- Board of Intermediate and Secondary Education, Peshawar
- Board of Intermediate and Secondary Education, Abbottabad
- Board of Intermediate and Secondary Education, Swat
- Board of Intermediate and Secondary Education, Bannu

=== Punjab ===
- Board of Intermediate and Secondary Education, Bahawalpur
- Board of Intermediate and Secondary Education, Dera Ghazi Khan
- Board of Intermediate and Secondary Education, Faisalabad
- Board of Intermediate and Secondary Education, Gujranwala
- Board of Intermediate and Secondary Education, Lahore
- Board of Intermediate and Secondary Education, Multan
- Board of Intermediate and Secondary Education, Rawalpindi
- Board of Intermediate and Secondary Education, Sahiwal
- Board of Intermediate and Secondary Education, Sargodha

=== Sindh ===
- Board of Intermediate and Secondary Education, Karachi
- Board of Intermediate and Secondary Education, Hyderabad
- Board of Intermediate and Secondary Education, Larkana

=== Azad Jammu and Kashmir ===
- AJK Board of Intermediate and Secondary Education, Mirpur

== See also ==
- Board of Secondary Education (disambiguation)
