= Board of Intermediate and Secondary Education, Sargodha =

Education board in Punjab, Pakistan

- هیئت تعلیم متوسط و ثانوی ، سرگودھا
- Logo of Board of Intermediate and Secondary Education, Sargodha

Education board overview
- Formed: 1968
- Jurisdiction: Sargodha Division which includes Districts: Sargodha; Khushab; Mianwali; Bhakkar
- Headquarters: Sargodha
- Website: bisesargodha.edu.pk

The Board of Intermediate and Secondary Education, Sargodha (BISE Sargodha) is a government board for intermediate (higher secondary) and secondary education examination. It is located in Sargodha, Punjab. Pakistan

== History ==
BISE Sargodha was established in 1968 under the West Pakistan Board of Intermediate and secondary (Sargodha and Multan). Building was shifted to its present location in 1975.

== Jurisdiction ==
The jurisdiction of Sargodha Board includes Sargodha Division which includes following districts:

- Sargodha District
- Khushab District
- Mianwali District
- Bhakkar District

== See also ==
- List of educational boards in Pakistan
- Board of Intermediate Education, Karachi
- Board of Secondary Education, Karachi
- Board of Intermediate and Secondary Education, Lahore
- Board of Intermediate and Secondary Education, Faisalabad
- Board of Intermediate and Secondary Education, Hyderabad
- Board of Intermediate and Secondary Education, Rawalpindi
- Board of Intermediate and Secondary Education, Multan
- Board of Intermediate and Secondary Education, Gujranwala
- Board of Intermediate and Secondary Education, Sahiwal
- Board of Intermediate and Secondary Education, Dera Ghazi Khan
- Board of Intermediate and Secondary Education, Bahawalpur
