= Board of Intermediate and Secondary Education, Faisalabad =

Education board in Punjab, Pakistan

- هیئت تعلیم متوسط و ثانوی ، فیصل آباد; BISE Fsd
- Logo of Board of Intermediate and Secondary Education, Faisalabad

Education Board overview
- Jurisdiction: Faisalabad Division which includes Districts: Faisalabad District; Chiniot District; Jhang District; Toba Tek Singh District
- Headquarters: Faisalabad; 31.4505°N 73.0846°E
- Website: bisefsd.edu.pk

The Board of Intermediate and Secondary Education, Faisalabad (colloquially known as BISE Faisalabad) is an examining board in Punjab, Pakistan.

== Introduction ==
BISE Faisalabad was established in 1988. The board's current jurisdiction was initially under the supervision of the Board of Intermediate and Secondary Education, Sargodha. Its main building is located on Jhang Road near Faisalabad International Airport.

== Jurisdiction ==
The jurisdiction of the Faisalabad Board includes the following districts in Faisalabad Division:

- Faisalabad
- Chiniot
- Toba Tek Singh
- Jhang

== BISE Faisalabad exams and results ==
Board of Intermediate and Secondary Education (BISE), Faisalabad conducts Matric (9th and 10th) class exams and Intermediate (HSSC part I and part II) exams every year. A great number of students participate in these exams every year. The exams mostly start in the month of March and end in April, while the results of BISE Faisalabad are announced in the month of July and August. The matric result is usually announced in July, while the inter result is announced by the end of August or the start of September. Results of all the classes are also published on the BISE website. On the days when the results of 10th and 12th class are announced, there is a ceremony at the Board office where medals and other awards are given to the position holder students.

== See also ==
- List of educational boards in Pakistan
- Board of Intermediate Education, Karachi
- Board of Secondary Education, Karachi
- Board of Intermediate and Secondary Education, Lahore
- Board of Intermediate and Secondary Education, Hyderabad
- Board of Intermediate and Secondary Education, Rawalpindi
- Board of Intermediate and Secondary Education, Multan
- Board of Intermediate and Secondary Education, Gujranwala
- Board of Intermediate and Secondary Education, Sargodha
