= Tanzeem ul Madaris Ahl-e-Sunnat Pakistan =

Association of Islamic institutions with 10000 Madaris

- Type: Board of Islamic seminaries
- Established: 1960
- Affiliations: Ahl e Sunnat (Barelvi)
- President: Mufti Muneeb-ur-Rehman
- Vice-president: Syed Arshad Seed Kazmi
- General Secretary: Sb Abd ul Mustfa Hzarvi
- Location: Lahore, Punjab, Pakistan
- Website: tanzeemulmadaris.com

Tanzeem ul Madaris or Tanzeem-ul-Madaris Ahl-e-Sunnat (Organization of Ahl e Sunnat Barelvi Madrassas) is a board of education working with over 18068 Sunni madrassas (Islamic schools) across Pakistan. It is a key seminary board in the country affiliated with the Barelvi movement within Sunni Islam. Grand Mufti Muneeb-ur-Rehman of Jamia Naeemia Lahore is the President of the board. The total strength of the students appeared in its examination was 600000 lac in 2013. Pakistan's Higher Education Commission recognizes the degrees awarded by madrassas affiliated to Tanzeem ul Madaris.

== About ==
Tanzeem-ul-Madaris Ahl-e-Sunnat was formed in 1959 in Lahore. The board examination and scheme covers boys' and girls' madrassas of Pakistan. The board is affiliated with HEC Islamabad Pakistan and Madrasah Education Board (PMEB) under Ordinance No.XL of 2001. The board is also part of Ittehad-e-Tanzeemat-Madaris Pakistan, an association of five boards of other movements working in the country. The ideology of the board is Barelvi, which is an ideological opponent of the Wahhabi doctrine.

8-Ravi Park Ravi Road Lahore is the central office of Tanzeem ul Madaris. It conducts examination according to its own scheme and syllabus.

As per Islam online, around 15,000 madrassas are administered by Tanzeem-ul-Madaris Ahl e Sunnat Pakistan. Tahzibul Akhbar in its report on the educational services of religious institutions has estimated that Tanzeem has 3000 institutions in Khyber Pakhtunwa and 1000 in the area of Hazara.

The final degree of Tanzeem-Ul-Madaris is equal to the MA Arabic & Islamic Studies or MA Arabic in Pakistan. Earlier Federal Interior Minister A. Rehman Malik demanded that Tanzeem-ul-Madaris should be awarded the status of Board. Sunni Madaris have taught same curriculum in their madrassas as it was taught by Mullah Nizamuddin Sihalvi of Farangi Mahal.

== Office bearers ==
Four education systems are being run under this organisation. Sarfraz Ahmed Naeemi, was earlier head of the Tanzeem-ul-Madaris Pakistan, has been known for his anti-Taliban stances, was killed by Talibani suicide Bomber.

== Madrassa reforms ==
Tanzeemul-Madaris made alterations in their curriculum. Deobandi Wafaq-ul-Madaris and Tanzeem-ul-Madaris Ahle Sunnat rejected the recommendation of National Committee for making deeni madaris education similar to that of formal education system

== Aims and objective ==
Tanzeem vows to remain non-political and religious in nature. As per the official website following are the aims and objectives.

- To produce a generation who both understand and apply the call of the Quran and Sunnah
- To enhance students with traditional Islamic sciences
- To produce scholars who serve Islam
- To convey the divine message to all mankind
- To represent true Islam and lead Muslim Ummah
- To motivate an Islamic revival

== Recent ==
In 2006 Tanzeem ul Madaris called for convening emergency meeting of OIC on blasphemous cartoon issue. During the Covid pandemic in 2020, madrassas associated with Tanzeem ul Madaris continued teaching in its thousands of seminaries in Sindh. Further, TM supported the government of Pakistan in implementing common curriculum all over the country, but rejected scrutiny of mosques and seminaries under FATF agenda.

== See also ==
- Islam in Pakistan
- Madrassas in Pakistan
