= List of Indian education boards =

== State education boards ==
S. No.	Name of Board (Abbreviation)	State/UT	Established	Key Details / Jurisdiction
STATE EDUCATION BOARDS
1	Uttar Pradesh Madhyamik Shiksha Parishad (UPMSP)	Uttar Pradesh	1921	Recognized as India's oldest education board, established under an Act of the United Provinces Legislative Council. Conducted its first examinations in 1923. Also known as the "UP Board".
2	West Bengal Board of Secondary Education (WBBSE)	West Bengal	1951	Established under the West Bengal Secondary Education Act of 1950. Conducts the Madhyamik Pariksha (Class 10). Renamed as WBBSE in 1964.
3	Bihar School Examination Board (BSEB)	Bihar	1952	Statutory body formed under Section 3 of the Bihar School Examination Act, 1952. Conducts Matric (Class 10) and Intermediate (Class 12) examinations.
4	Maharashtra State Board of Secondary and Higher Secondary Education (MSBSHSE)	Maharashtra	1965	Established on January 1, 1966, under the Maharashtra Act No. 41 of 1965. Conducts SSC (Class 10) and HSC (Class 12) examinations. One of the largest education boards in India.
5	Madhya Pradesh Board of Secondary Education (MPBSE)	Madhya Pradesh	1965	Established under the Madhya Pradesh Madhyamik Shiksha Adhiniyam, 1965. Supervises secondary and higher secondary education in the state.
6	Karnataka Secondary Education Examination Board (KSEEB)	Karnataka	1966	Set up in 1966 as the Secondary Education Examination Board to bring uniformity in secondary education. Conducts SSLC (Class 10) examinations.
7	Directorate of Government Examinations (DGE TN)	Tamil Nadu	1975	Established in 1975 to unify and streamline all school-level public examinations in Tamil Nadu under one administrative body. Conducts SSLC (Class 10) and Higher Secondary (Class 12) examinations.
8	Andhra Pradesh Board of Secondary Education (BSEAP)	Andhra Pradesh	1969	Conducts SSC (Class 10) examinations. Recognized for regular curriculum updates.
9	Board of Intermediate Education, Andhra Pradesh (BIEAP)	Andhra Pradesh	1971	Conducts Intermediate (Class 11 and 12) examinations. Prepares students for EAMCET and JEE.
10	Andhra Pradesh Open School Society (APOSS)	Andhra Pradesh	1991	Provides open and distance learning opportunities at secondary and senior secondary levels.
11	Board of Secondary Education, Assam (SEBA)	Assam	1962	Conducts HSLC (Class 10) examinations. Emphasis on regional studies and local culture.
12	Assam Higher Secondary Education Council (AHSEC)	Assam	1984	Conducts Higher Secondary (Class 12) examinations.
13	Bihar Board of Open Schooling and Examination (BBOSE)	Bihar	2011	Provides open schooling facilities for students who cannot attend regular schools.
14	Chhattisgarh Board of Secondary Education (CGBSE)	Chhattisgarh	2000	Conducts Class 10 and 12 board examinations in the state of Chhattisgarh.
15	Chhattisgarh State Open School (CGSOS)	Chhattisgarh	2008	Offers distance education programs at school level.
16	Goa Board of Secondary and Higher Secondary Education (GBSHSE)	Goa	1975	Conducts SSC (Class 10) and HSSC (Class 12) examinations for Goa state.
17	Gujarat Secondary and Higher Secondary Education Board (GSEB)	Gujarat	1972	Supervises SSC (Class 10) and HSC (Class 12) education. Known for digital evaluation.
18	Haryana Board of School Education (HBSE)	Haryana	1969	Conducts Middle, Matric, and Senior Secondary examinations. First board to introduce semester system.
19	Himachal Pradesh Board of School Education (HPBOSE)	Himachal Pradesh	1969	Conducts Class 10 and 12 board exams with focus on local languages and inclusive education.
20	Jammu and Kashmir State Board of School Education (JKBOSE)	Jammu and Kashmir	1965	Conducts examinations for secondary and higher secondary students in the union territory.
21	Jharkhand Academic Council (JAC)	Jharkhand	2003	Conducts Class 10 and 12 board examinations in the state of Jharkhand.
22	Department of Pre-University Education, Karnataka (DPUE)	Karnataka	1966	Conducts II PUC (Class 12) examinations. Works towards uniformity in evaluation.
23	Kerala Board of Public Examination (KBPE)	Kerala	1965	Conducts SSLC (Class 10) examinations. Kerala's board is famed for high literacy rates.
24	Directorate of General Education (Higher Secondary Wing) (DGE)	Kerala	1990	Conducts Higher Secondary (Class 12) examinations for Science, Humanities, and Commerce streams.
25	Board of Vocational Higher Secondary Education, Kerala	Kerala	1990	Conducts vocational higher secondary examinations.
26	Madhya Pradesh State Open School Education Board (MPSOS)	Madhya Pradesh	1996	Provides open schooling facilities at secondary and senior secondary levels.
27	Board of Secondary Education, Manipur (BSEM)	Manipur	1972	Conducts High School Leaving Certificate examinations.
28	Council of Higher Secondary Education, Manipur (COHSEM)	Manipur	1992	Conducts Higher Secondary examinations in the state.
29	Meghalaya Board of School Education (MBOSE)	Meghalaya	1973	Regarded as one of the most competent education boards in north-eastern states.
30	Mizoram Board of School Education (MBSE)	Mizoram	1975	Conducts secondary and higher secondary examinations in Mizoram.
31	Nagaland Board of School Education (NBSE)	Nagaland	1973	Conducts High School and Higher Secondary examinations in Nagaland.
32	Board of Secondary Education, Odisha (BSE Odisha)	Odisha	1953	Conducts High School Certificate (Class 10) examinations.
33	Council of Higher Secondary Education, Odisha (CHSE Odisha)	Odisha	1982	Conducts Higher Secondary (Class 12) examinations in the state.
34	Punjab School Education Board (PSEB)	Punjab	1969	Conducts Class 10 and 12 board examinations in the state of Punjab.
35	Board of Secondary Education, Rajasthan (RBSE)	Rajasthan	1957	Conducts secondary and senior secondary examinations in Rajasthan.
36	Rajasthan State Open School (RSOS)	Rajasthan	2005	Provides open and distance learning opportunities.
37	Board of Secondary Education, Telangana State (BSE TS)	Telangana	2016	Conducts SSC (Class 10) examinations in Telangana.
38	Telangana State Board of Intermediate Education (TSBIE)	Telangana	2014	Regulates Intermediate (Class 11 and 12) education. Offers General and Vocational streams.
39	Telangana Open School Society (TOSS)	Telangana	1991	Provides open schooling facilities at secondary and senior secondary levels.
40	Tripura Board of Secondary Education (TBSE)	Tripura	1973	Conducts Madhyamik (Class 10) and Higher Secondary (Class 12) examinations.
41	Uttarakhand Board of School Education (UBSE)	Uttarakhand	2001	Manages Class 10 and 12 exams. Syllabus includes Hindi, English, Sanskrit, and regional languages.
42	West Bengal Council of Higher Secondary Education (WBCHSE)	West Bengal	1975	Conducts Higher Secondary (Class 12) examinations.
43	West Bengal Council of Rabindra Open Schooling (WBCROS)	West Bengal	2001	Provides open schooling opportunities.
44	West Bengal State Council of Technical & Vocational Education and Skill Development (WBSCTVE)	West Bengal	2005	Conducts technical and vocational examinations.
45	West Bengal Board of Madrasah Education (WBBME)	West Bengal	1994	Established under the West Bengal Madrasah Act of 1994. Conducts the Alim & Fazil Examination (Class 10).

== Central and national level education boards ==
S. No.	Name of Board (Abbreviation)	Established	Headquarters	Key Details / Jurisdiction
1	Central Board of Secondary Education (CBSE)	1929 (as board), 1962 (as CBSE)	New Delhi	Most prominent national-level board with over 27,000 affiliated schools. Follows NCERT curriculum. Conducts AISSE (Class 10) and AISSCE (Class 12) examinations.
2	Council for the Indian School Certificate Examinations (CISCE)	1958	New Delhi	Private, non-governmental national board. Conducts ICSE (Class 10) and ISC (Class 12) examinations. Known for comprehensive curriculum focusing on language, science, and arts.
3	National Institute of Open Schooling (NIOS)	1989	Noida, Uttar Pradesh	Established by Ministry of Education (then MHRD). Largest open schooling system in the world. Provides flexible, open and distance learning at secondary and senior secondary levels.
