= Board of Secondary Education =

Board of Secondary Education may refer to the following authorities:

== India ==
- Central Board of Secondary Education
- Andhra Pradesh Board of Secondary Education
- Board of Secondary Education, Assam
- Chhattisgarh Board of Secondary Education
- Gujarat Secondary and Higher Secondary Education Board
- Board of Secondary Education, Madhya Pradesh
- Maharashtra State Board of Secondary and Higher Secondary Education
- Board of Secondary Education, Odisha
- Board of Secondary Education, Rajasthan
- Board of Secondary Education, Telangana
- Tripura Board of Secondary Education
- West Bengal Board of Secondary Education

== Pakistan ==
- Board of Secondary Education, Karachi

== See also ==
- Board of Intermediate and Secondary Education (disambiguation)
- List of Intermediate and Secondary Education Boards in Bangladesh
