= Board of Intermediate and Secondary Education, Hyderabad =

Educational board in Pakistan

Agency overview
- Formed: 1961
- Headquarters: Hyderabad, Sindh
- Website: www.biseh.edu.pk

The Board of Intermediate and Secondary Education was formed in 1961 in the city of Hyderabad, Sindh to facilitate examinations for high schools and higher secondary schools, also called intermediate colleges.

== History ==
A commission on national education was appointed on 30 December 1958 which recommended the four years of education from grade IX to XII as part of the intermediate and secondary education curricula thus forming the Board of Intermediate and Secondary Education in Hyderabad in 1961.

The move came as part of the West Pakistan Intermediate and Secondary Education Ordinance, 1961 (alternatively for East Pakistan, it was the East Pakistan Ordinance No. XXXIII of 1961). The ordinance was further amended in Act no. XVI of 1962 and Act no. XVII of 1977. Under the acts, it was responsible for the organization to regulate, supervise, control and develop the levels and status of Intermediate and Secondary level public examinations in educational institutions.

The board started acting under the guidance of Dr G. A. Jafri, appointed as the board's chairman. Soon afterwards, the board was further bifurcated into a board for Sukkur and recently for Mirpur Khas.

== Administration ==
The board is headed by a Chairman, who along with the secretary of the board manages the affairs of the board. The examination department is headed by a controller of examinations.

== Organisation ==
As an organisation, the board has developed in the recent years a 202 members strong staff and is equipped with offices in Latifabad U8. The board also owns a stadium in Latifabad used for league, inter-club and city hockey tournaments.

== See also ==
- List of educational boards in Pakistan
- Board of Intermediate Education, Karachi
- Board of Secondary Education, Karachi
- Board of Intermediate and Secondary Education, Lahore
- Board of Intermediate and Secondary Education, Faisalabad
- Board of Intermediate and Secondary Education, Rawalpindi
- Board of Intermediate and Secondary Education, Multan
- Board of Intermediate and Secondary Education, Gujranwala
- Board of Intermediate and Secondary Education, Sargodha
