= List of education boards in Pakistan =

Boards of Intermediate and secondary education in Pakistan are responsible for conducting intermediate and secondary education examinations. These boards set their educational policy under the supervision of the provincial education ministry. This list of education boards in Pakistan shows their year of establishment, jurisdictions (districts) and websites, arranged alphabetically.

== Government boards ==
=== Intermediate and secondary education boards ===
Islamabad

Board	Established	Jurisdictions	Website	Refs
Federal Board of Intermediate and Secondary Education	1975	Islamabad Capital Territory, Cantonments and Garrisons Gilgit-Baltistan Pakistan International School (abroad)		

Punjab

Board	Established	Jurisdictions	Website	Refs
Bahawalpur	1998	Bahawalpur District, Bahawalnagar District, Rahim Yar Khan District		
Dera Ghazi Khan	1989	Dera Ghazi Khan District, Muzaffargarh District, Layyah District, Rajanpur District		
Faisalabad	1988	Faisalabad District, Chiniot District, Jhang District, Toba Tek Singh District		
Gujranwala	1976	Gujranwala District, Gujrat District, Mandi Bahauddin District, Hafizabad District, Narowal District, Sialkot District, Wazirabad District		
Lahore	1954	Lahore District, Sheikhupura District, Nankana Sahib District, Kasur District		
Multan	1968	Multan District, Khanewal District, Vehari District, Lodhran District		
Rawalpindi	1977	Rawalpindi District, Jhelum District, Attock District, Chakwal District		
Sahiwal	2012	Sahiwal District, Okara District, Pakpattan District		
Sargodha	1968	Sargodha District, Khushab District, Mianwali District, Bhakkar District		

Sindh

Board	Established	Jurisdictions	Website	Refs
Hyderabad	1961	Hyderabad District, Matiari District, Jamshoro District, Tando Allahyar District, Tando Muhammad Khan District, Thatta, Badin District, Sujawal District		
Karachi (Intermediate)	1974	Karachi Division		
Karachi (Secondary)	1950	Karachi Division		
Larkana	1995	Larkana Division		
Mirpur Khas	1973	Mirpur Khas Division, Sanghar District		
Sukkur	1979	Sukkur District, Khairpur, District Ghotki,		
Shaheed Benazirabad	2015	Shaheed Benazirabad District, Sanghar District, Dadu District, Naushahro Feroze District		

Khyber Pakhtunkhwa

Board	Established	Jurisdictions	Website	Refs
Abbottabad	1990	Abbottabad District, Mansehra District, Haripur District, Upper Kohistan District, Lower Kohistan District, Torghar District, Battagram District		
Bannu	1990	Bannu Division		
Dera Ismail Khan	2006	Dera Ismail Khan Division		
Kohat	2002	Kohat Division		
Malakand	1961	Swat District, Malakand District, Upper Dir District, Lower Dir District, Bajaur District		
Mardan	1975	Mardan District, Swabi District, Nowshera District		
Peshawar	1961	Peshawar District, Charsadda District, Upper Chitral District, Lower Chitral District, Khyber District		
Swat	1992	Swat District, Shangla District, Buner District		

Balochistan

Board	Established	Jurisdictions	Website	Ref.
Quetta	1976	Quetta Division, Zhob Division, Sibi Division Loralai Division, Nasirabad Division		
Khuzdar	2020	Khuzdar Division		
Turbat	2020	Makran Division, Rakhshan Division		

Azad Jammu and Kashmir

Board	Established	Jurisdictions	Website	Refs
Mirpur	1973	Azad Jammu and Kashmir		

=== Technical education boards ===
Board	Established	Jurisdiction	Website	Refs
Punjab Board of Technical Education	1963	Punjab		
Sindh Board of Technical Education	1970	Sindh		
Khyber Pakhtunkhwa Board of Technical Education	1973	Khyber Pakhtunkhwa		

== Other boards ==
=== Private boards ===
Board	Established	Jurisdiction	Website	Refs
Aga Khan University Examination Board	2003	Pakistan		
Ziauddin University Examination Board	2018	Sindh		

=== Religious education boards ===
Board	Established	Website
Wifaq ul Madaris Al-Arabia	1959	
Tanzeem ul Madaris Ahle Sunnat	1960	
Wafaq ul Madaris Al Salafiyyah	1955	
Rabta-ul-Madaris	1983	
Wifaq ul Madaris Al-Shia	1959	
Majma-ul-Uloom Al-Islamia	2021	
Wahdat ul Madaris	2021	

=== Church education boards ===
Board	Established	City	Website	Refs
Catholic Board of Education, Pakistan	1961	Karachi		
Catholic Board of Education, Pakistan	1961	Lahore		
Diocesan board of education, Pakistan	1960	Islamabad, Rawalpindi		
Presbyterian Education Board Pakistan		Lahore, Punjab		

|- |Pakistan Paper Time - List of Educational Boards In Pakistan | |Punjab, Sindh, Khyber Pakhtunkhwa (KP), Balochistan, Islamabad Capital Territory (ICT), Gilgit-Baltistan (GB), Azad Jammu & Kashmir (AJK) | |}
