= NCR College of Emerging Technologies =

NCR-CET
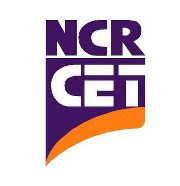
- NCR-CET logo

Location
- Karachi; Pakistan
- Coordinates: 24°53′20.11″N 67°4′7.63″E

Information
- Type: Intermediate college
- President: Ghulam Mahmood Desmukh
- Principal: Professor Mumtaz
- Colors: Purple, Orange, White
- Affiliation: Board of Intermediate Education Karachi
- Website: Official website

NCR-CET or NCR College of Emerging Technologies is a private intermediate college located in Karachi, Pakistan providing Higher Secondary education (XI & XII). The college provides faculties of Pre Engineering, Pre-medical, Commerce and General Science, It is affiliated with Board of Intermediate Education, Karachi.

== See also ==
- List of colleges in Karachi
- List of schools in Karachi
- List of universities in Karachi
- List of colleges in Karachi
- Education in Pakistan
