= List of colleges in Karachi =

== Boys ==
College Name	College address	Website/
Sceptre College	F8 Forum St, Block 9 Clifton, Karachi, 75500	
Adamjee Government Science College	Jamshed Town in the Garden East area near Gurumandir Roundabout, off Business Recorder Road on Shahani street. Karachi	
D. J. Sindh Government Science College	Near Jang Press Chowrangi, Dr. Ziauddin Road, Saddar Town	
Government Aisha Bawani College	Saddar Town	
Government Boys College	Korangi-2½	
Government Boys College	Landhi-4	
Government Boys College	Surjani Town	
Government College for Boys	Asifabad Town	
Government College for Boys	Baldia Town	
Government College for Men Nazimabad	Liaquatabad Town	
Government College of Commerce & Economics	Dr. Ziauddin Road, near PIDC Building	
Government College of Technology		
Government Country College Musa Colony	Gulberg Town	
Government Degree Arts and Commerce College	Landhi	
Government Degree Boys College	Gulzar-e-Hijri, Gulshan Town; Jungle Shah, Kemari Town; Razzaqabad, Bin Qasim Town; Sabzi Mandi, New Karachi Town	
Government Degree Boys Post Graduate College	Gulistan-e-Jauhar, Gulshan Town	
Government Degree College	Gulshan-e-Iqbal, Block-7, Gulshan Town; Malir Cantt; Mango Pir, Gadap Town; Murrad Memon Goth, Gadap Town; Quaidabad, Bin Qasim Town; SRE-lll Majeed Stadium Road, Gulshan Town	
Government Degree College for Boys	North Karachi, New Karachi Town	
Government Degree Commerce College	Malir	
Government Degree Science and Commerce College	Landhi; Lyari Town; Orangi Town	
Government Degree Science College	7D-2, Anda Mor; Buffer Zone, North Nazimabad Town; Liaquatabad; Malir	
Government Dehli Inter Science College	Hussainabad	
Government Islamia Arts and Commerce College	Jamshed Town	
Government Jamia Millia Degree College	Shah Faisal Town	
Government Khushak College for Boys	Shah Faisal Town	
Government National College	Off Shaheed-e-Millat Road, near Jail Chowrangi	
Government PECHS Education Foundation Science College	Jamshed Town	
Government Polytechnic Institute	Lyari	
Government Sirajudallah College	Liaquatabad Town	
Government Superior Science College	Shah Faisal Town	
Government Zia-uddin Memorial Nabi Bagh Inter Science College	Preedy Street, Saddar Town	
Haji Abdullah Haroon Government College	Lyari Town	
Government Islamia Science College	Jamshed Town	
Liaquat Government College	Malir	
MDH College for Boys		
Pakistan Shipowners' College	North Nazimabad	
Pakistan Swiss Training Centre	PSTC - PCSIR; Suparco Road Sch-33G Johar P.C.S.I.R. Campus; University Road; Karachi, Pakistan 75280	
Pakistan Swedish Institute of Technology	Quaidabad	
Pakistan Switzerland Training Center	PCSIR	
Paradise Commerce College	North Nazimabad	
Premier Government College	North Nazimabad Town	
Quaid-e-Millat Government College	Liaquatabad Town	
S.M. Government Arts and Commerce College	Saddar Town	
S.M. Government Science College	Sharah-e-Liaquat	
Zam Zama Grammar School and College	Gizri, Clifton Cantonment	
Siraj ud Daula College	F.B. Area	
Government Degree College Memon Goth	Murad Memon Goth	

== Girls ==
College name	College address	Website
Abdullah Government College for Women	Iqbal Town	
Adler College For Girls	D-51, Block 4, Gulshan-e-Iqbal	
Al-Beroni Intermediate College	Ahsanabad	
Al-Haq Girls College	ST-5 / 1, Block-1, Gulshan-e-Iqbal	
APWA Government College for Women	Gulberg Town	
Arabic Girls College For Islamic Studies	New Karachi Town	
City College for Women	Clifton, Saddar Town	
DHA Degree College For Women	Defence Housing Authority	
Government College for Women	Shahrah-e-Liaquat, Saddar Town; F.B. Area, Gulberg Town; Korangi-4, Korangi Town; Korangi–6, Korangi Town; Nazimabad, Liaquatabad Town; New Karachi, New Karachi Town; North Karachi, New Karachi Town; Saudabad, Malir Town	
Government College of Commerce and Economics	Saddar Town	
Government Degree College	Gulshan-e-Iqbal, Gulshan Town; Malir Cantt. Stadium Road, Gulshan Town	
Government Degree Girls College	Ibrahim Hydri, Korangi Town; Lines Area, Jamshed Town; Metrovile, S.I.T.E. Town; Punjabi Club, Light house, Saddar Town; Sector 11½, Orangi Town	
Government Girls College	Gulshan-e-Iqbal; Korangi; Al-Noor, Gulberg Town; Baldia Town; New Karachi Town; Gizri, Saddar Town; Gulistan-e-Johar; Industrial Area Landhi; Landhi 3½; Landhi, North Nazimabad; Liaquatabad; Lyari; Mahmudabad, Jamshed Town; Orangi Town; P.I.B. Colony	
Government Girls Commerce and Arts College	Malir	
Government Girls Science and Commerce College	North Nazimabad Town	
Government Girls Science College	Shah Faisal Town	
Government Islamia College for Women	Jamshed Town	
Government Karachi College for Women	Saddar Town	
Government PECHS College for Women	Jamshed Town	
Government SMB Fatima Jinnah Girls College	Saddar Town	
H.I. Osmania Government College for Women	Liaquatabad Town	
Hayat-ul-Islam Girls Degree College	Gulshan Town	
HRH Agha Khan Government Girls College	Gulshan Town	
Institute Of Montessori Education	C87, Block 2, Clifton	
Khatoon-e-Pakistan Government College for Women	Gulshan Town	
Khatoon-e-Pakistan Government Degree College	Stadium Road	
Khurshid Government College for Women	Shah Faisal Town	
Liaquat Government College for Girls Malir	Malir Town	
Metropolis College for Girls	Gulberg Town	
Model College for Girls Karachi	North Nazimabad Town	
Nishter Government Girls College	New Karachi Town	
Pakistan Polytechnic Center		
Premier Government College for Girls	North Nazimabad Town	
Rana Liaquat Ali Khan Government College of Home Economics	Gulshan Town	
Raunaq-e-Islam Government College for Women	Lyari Town	
Riaz Government Girls College	Liaquatabad Town	
Shaheed-e-Millat Government Degree Girls	Gulshan Town	
Sir Syed Government Girls College	Liaquatabad Town	
St. Lawrence Government Girls College	Jamshed Town	

== Federal government colleges ==
College name	College address	Website/
Federal Government College	Daud Pota Road, Karachi Cantonment	
Federal Government Inter Girls College	Askari Road, Karachi Cantonment	

== Colleges administrated by the Pakistan military ==
=== Pakistan Army ===
College name	College address	Website
Army Public College	Lucky Star, Lines Area, Saddar	
Army Public College	Malir Cantt.	
Army Public College	Shah Faisal Town	

=== Pakistan Navy ===
College name	College address	Website
Bahria College Karsaz	Habib Rahmathullah Road, KARSAZ	
Bahria College NORE-I		
Bahria Foundation College	Dr. Sulaiman Ali Shah Road, North Nazimabad; Abul Hasan Ispahani Road, Gulshan-e-Iqbal	

=== Pakistan Air Force ===
College name	College address	Website
Fazia Degree College	Faisal Air Base	
Fazaia Inter College	Korangi Creek, Korangi Cantonment; Malir Cantonment	
Saleem Nawaz Fazaia College	Masroor Air Base	
New Fazaia Intermediate College, Faisal	PAF Base Faisal	
