= SZABIST University =

University in Karachi, Pakistan

- مؤسسه علوم و فناوری شهید ذوالفقار علی بھٹو معهد الشهيد ذو الفقار علي بوتو للعلوم والتكنولوجيا
- Other name: SZABIST University
- Motto: 'Discover Yourself'
- Type: Private university
- Established: 1995
- Founder: Benazir Bhutto
- Affiliations: Higher Education Commission (Pakistan), Pakistan Engineering Council; University of London International Programmes; Association of Commonwealth Universities; Association to Advance Collegiate Schools of Business; Board of Intermediate and Secondary Education, Larkana
- Chancellor: Azra Fazal Pechuho
- President: Dr. Muhammad Altaf Mukati
- Vice-president: Altaf Mukati (Academics), Nasreen Haque (Projects and Finance), Imtiaz Kazi (Admin and HR)
- Location: Karachi-75600, Sindh, Pakistan; 24.8187°N 67.0316°E
- Campus: Karachi (main campus) Sub-campuses: Islamabad, Hyderabad, Larkana, Benazirabad, Dubai, Khairpur, Gharo, Sehwan
- Colours: Cobalt, white, black
- Website: szabist.edu.pk

Shaheed Zulfikar Ali Bhutto Institute of Science and Technology or SZABIST University is a multi-campus private university with campuses in various major cities of Pakistan and the United Arab Emirates. Its main campus is located in Karachi, Sindh, Pakistan.

== Overview ==
Begun in 1995 under the vision of its founder Pakistani Former Prime Minister Benazir Bhutto and led by Dr. Javaid Laghari as its first president and project director, SZABIST University is honored and named in remembrance of Shaheed Zulfikar Ali Bhutto. SZABIST is a non-profit and Chartered Institute of Science and Technology, Established through Legislative Act of the Sindh Assembly (Sindh Act No. XI of 1995). SZABIST has been awarded the status of University in September 2023 through amendment in Sindh Act No. XIX of 2023.

The university offers undergraduate and post-graduate degrees. It is a member of the Association of Commonwealth Universities of the United Kingdom and the Association to Advance Collegiate Schools of Business, as well as other international education associations. SZABIST University is regarded as one of the more notable private research institutions of higher learning in Pakistan and ranked among the nation's top-ten institutions by the Higher Education Commission, as of 2013.

In addition, its business management program is listed as top ranking by the publication Business Week and is ranked among other noticeable science institutions by CNN & Time and Asiaweek. SZABIST University is identified as a major centre of higher learning in Pakistan and is one of the largest private universities in the country, according to the HEC.

== Recognition ==
- SZABIST University wins the Silver Category at the UNESCO 2024 Future Designer Innovation Awards & Science for SDGs Innovation Contest. SZABIST University is the only Pakistani University to get selected among 2000+ submissions from over 60 countries. A total of 50 projects were shortlisted, including 5 Gold, 8 Silver, 12 Bronze, and 25 nomination awards granted.
- Forbes 50 Over 50 Global: 2025 has recognized Madam Shahnaz Wazir Ali (President SZABIST University) among the world's most influential women who are creating meaningful impact in business, politics, science, and society.

== Academics ==
SZABIST University offers programs in Management Sciences, Computer Sciences, Media Sciences, Law, Mechatronics Engineering, Public Health, Biosciences, Biotechnology, Social Sciences, Education, Robotics and Artificial Intelligence. Some of the programs are external and offered in collaboration with universities in the UK. The following is a list of offered degrees:

- Management Sciences: Bachelor of Business Administration (BBA), BS in Accounting & Finance (BS A&F), BS Entrepreneurship, Master of Business Administration (MBA), Master of Project Management (MPM), MS in Project Management (MSPM), MS Finance & Economics, Master of Science (MS) in Management Sciences and Doctor of Philosophy (Ph.D.) in Management Sciences.
- Computer Science: BS Computer Science, BS Software Engineering MS Computer Science, MS Cyber Security Doctor of Philosophy (Ph.D.) in Computer Sciences.
- Mechatronics Engineering: BE Mechatronics Engineering, Bachelor of Science in Autonomous Systems and Artificial Intelligence
- Robotics & Artificial Intelligence: BS Artificial Intelligence and MS Data Science
- Social Sciences: BS Social Sciences, MS Social Sciences, BS English, BS Psychology, Ph.D Social Sciences
- Media Sciences: BS Media Sciences with majors in Production and Advertising.
- Biosciences: BS Biosciences, BS Biotechnology, BS Computational Biology, BS Food Science & Technology MS Biosciences and Ph.D Biosciences.
- Education: BS Educational Psychology, Bachelor of Education (B.ED) 1.5 Years and MS Educational Leadership & Management and Ph.D. Educational Leadership & Management
- Public Health: BS Public Health and MS Public Health.
- External Programs: SZABIST University offers external programs in Law (LLB) BA (Hons) in Business Studies from Coventry University (UK)

== Accreditations ==
The Bachelor of Business Administration (BBA) and the Master of Business Administration (MBA) programs are accredited by the National Business Education Accreditation Council (NBEAC). Bachelor of Science Computer Science (BSCS) program is accredited by the National Computing Education & Accreditation Council (NCEAC). BE Mechatronic Engineering program is accredited by Pakistan Engineering Council (PEC). MS in Educational Leadership and Management is accredited by National Accreditation Council for Teacher Education (NACTE).

- AACSB Membership SZABIST University is a member of AACSB International which advances quality management education worldwide through accreditation, thought leadership, and value-added services. AACSB International members are located in more than 70 countries around the world.
- Association of Chartered Certified Accountants ACCA, UK SZABIST University BS Accounting & Finance graduates can avail exemption of 9 papers (F1 to F9) in ACCA-UK qualification. BBA Program is also accredited by the ACCA-UK. Bachelors of Business Administration (BBA) program is also accredited with ACCA-UK.
- Institute of Chartered Accountants of Pakistan (ICAP) SZABIST University BS Accounting & Finance graduates will be able to claim 9 exemptions in ICAP Pakistan qualification. Moreover a (2.5 Year) BSAF option is available for CAF qualified ICAP students.

== HEC ranking ==
SZABIST ranked amongst the top three universities for 2014 in Business and Information Technology by the Higher Education Commission of Pakistan (HEC).

== International Agreements ==
SZABIST has signed articulation agreements with the University of South Wales and the University of Northampton, UK. SZABIST has signed MoUs with the State University of New York, USA; University of London, UK; Philippine Women's University, Philippines and the Asian Academy of Film & Television, India.

== Scholarships and Financial Assistance ==
SZABIST University offers financial assistance to eligible and deserving students in the form of various SZABIST University funded and external donor funded scholarships as under:

- SZABIST Need-Based Scholarship
- SZABIST Merit-Based Scholarship
- SZABIST Talent Based Scholarship
- SZABIST Sindh Police Shaheed Scholarship
- Chief Minister SZABIST Merit & Need-Based Scholarship Balochistan
- Education Endowment Fund Scholarship Sindh Education
- Endowment Fund Scholarship
- Pakistan Education Endowment Fund Scholarship
- Orange Tree Foundation Scholarship
- Higher Education Opportunities for Students of Balochistan & FATA
- Indigenous Ph.D. Fellowship Program
- Sindh HEC Indigenous Scholarship
- Various community-based scholarships
- SZABIST also offers loan facilities as under:
- Ihsan Trust Interest-Free Loan Facility (Qarz-e-Hasna) The
- Citizens Foundation Financial Assistance
- EDUFI Study Now, Pay Later (Educational Loan)

== SZABIST ZABTech Institutes ==
- Intermediate program: SZABIST offers Intermediate at SZABIST Intermediate campus Larkana in affiliation with Board of Intermediate and Secondary Education, Larkana (BISE Larkana).
- Intermediate program: SZABIST offers Intermediate at SZABIST Intermediate campus Shaheed Benazirabad in affiliation with Board of Intermediate and Secondary Education, Shaheed Benazirabad (BISE SBA).
- Intermediate program: SZABIST offers Intermediate at SZABIST Intermediate campus Hyderabad in affiliation with Board of Intermediate and Secondary Education, Hyderabad (BISE Hyderabad).
- Intermediate program: SZABIST offers Intermediate at SZABIST Intermediate campus Khairpur Mirs in affiliation with Board of Intermediate and Secondary Education, Sukkur (BISE Sukkur).
- Intermediate program: SZABIST offers Intermediate at SZABIST Intermediate campus Tando Muhammad Khan in affiliation with Board of Intermediate and Secondary Education, Hyderabad (BISE Hyderabad).
- Intermediate program: SZABIST offers Intermediate at SZABIST Intermediate campus Sehwan in affiliation with Board of Intermediate and Secondary Education, Hyderabad (BISE Hyderabad).
- Intermediate program: SZABIST offers Intermediate at SZABIST Intermediate campus Gharo (Thatta) in affiliation with Board of Intermediate and Secondary Education, Hyderabad (BISE Hyderabad).

== See also ==
- List of Islamic educational institutions
- Zulfiqar Ali Bhutto § Death
