= Board of Intermediate and Secondary Education, Multan =

Education board in Multan, Pakistan

Board of Intermediate and Secondary Education, Multan هیئت تعلیم متوسط و ثانوی، ملتان
- BISE Multan
- Logo of Board of Intermediate and Secondary Education, Multan

Education Board overview
- Formed: March 30, 1968
- Preceding agencies: Ministry of Education (Punjab); Higher Education Department, Govt. Of Punjab
- Jurisdiction: Multan Division which includes Districts: Multan; Vehari; Lodhran; Khanewal
- Headquarters: Near Justice Colony, Gol Bagh Gulgasht Colony, Multan; 30.222171°N 71.46937°E
- Employees: 500+
- Education Board executives: Amir Kareem Khan, Chairman; Khurram S.A Qureshi, Secretary; Hamid Saeed, Controller Of Examinations; Qazi Mujeeb ur Rehman, System Analyst; Adeel Iqbal, Web Developer; Muhammad Aatif Aneeq, Computer Operator; Muhammad Aslam Bhutta, Public Relation Officer; Baran Khan, Data Manager; Rauf Khokhar, Deputy Secretary
- Website: www.bisemultan.edu.pk

The Board of Intermediate and Secondary Education, Multan (BISE, Multan) was established on 30 March 1968. It is near Gol Bagh, Gulgasht Colony, Multan, Pakistan. It is responsible for all matriculation (secondary) and intermediate (higher secondary) exams (F.A /F.Sc.) of Multan Division schools and colleges as well as all the private candidates.

== Jurisdiction ==
Jurisdiction of Multan Board includes Multan Division which includes following districts:

- Multan
- Khanewal
- Vehari
- Lodhran

== See also ==
- List of educational boards in Pakistan
- Board of Intermediate and Secondary Education, Dera Ghazi Khan
- Board of Intermediate and Secondary Education, Bahawalpur
- Board of Intermediate and Secondary Education, Lahore
- Board of Intermediate and Secondary Education, Faisalabad
- Board of Intermediate and Secondary Education, Rawalpindi
- Board of Intermediate and Secondary Education, Gujranwala
- Board of Intermediate and Secondary Education, Sargodha
