= Bahria Schools and Colleges =

Pakistani navy school in Karachi

- پاکستان بحریہ مدرسه
- Karachi, Sindh; Pakistan

Information
- Type: Public / Naval
- School district: Karachi
- Affiliation: Board of Secondary Education Karachi / Pakistan Navy Educational Trust

Bahria Schools and Colleges (Urdu: پاکستان بحریہ مدرسه) were established by the Pakistan Navy (PN) for the education of the children of its officers, sailors, and civilian employees at Karachi, Sindh.

Its branches are located in Islamabad, Karachi, Lahore, Gwadar, Ormara, Turbat, Jiwani.

== Branches ==
- Bahria Model School & College Sabir S.R.E
- Bahria College Lahore, founded in 2012
- Bahria College Islamabad
- Bahria Foundation College Dhamial
- Bahria College NORE 1
- Bahria College Karsaz
- Bahria Model School Hanif S.R.E
- Bahria College EAB-1 Campus Majeed
- Bahria College EAB-2 Campus Majeed
- Bahria Model College Ormara
- Bahria Model College Gwadar
- Bahria Model School Jiwani
- Bahria Model School PNWHS Gharo Bin Qasim
- Bahria Model School Turbat

== Clubs and societies ==
- Bazm-i-Adab
- English Literary Society
- Art & Science Modeling Club

== Notable alumni ==
- Shahid Ali Khan - retired field hockey goalkeeper from Pakistan
- Sahir Lodhi - TV, radio compere actor, singer
- Shaista Lodhi - Geo TV host
- Javeria Saud - actress, producer, Naat Khuan, singer
- Fakhar Zaman (cricketer) - cricketer

== See also ==
- Bahria University
- Board of Secondary Education Karachi
- Board of Intermediate Education Karachi
