= Tassaduq Sohail =

Pakistani painter, short story writer (1930-2017)

- Born: October 30, 1930; Jalandhar, British India
- Died: October 2, 2017 (aged 86); Karachi, Pakistan
- Resting place: Phase IV Qabristan, Karachi
- Education: Government Islamia Science College, Karachi; Saint Martin's School of Art
- Known for: Painting

Tassaduq Sohail (30 October 1930 – 2 October 2017) was a Pakistani painter and short story writer. Primarily known for his paintings, his first artwork appeared in an exhibition of Royal Academy of Arts in London around 1978; later his work appeared at Bonhams's international art exhibition in 2007 which helped him to be recognized as a prominent artist.

He produced most of work about animals and portrayed them as superior creatures besides portraying dogs and birds moving out in the early morning. He also depicted social condemnation and non-conformance. Some of his artwork depicted "women with their eyes tell stories of their fears and desires".

== Biography ==
He was born in Jalandhar, British India in 1930. Following the partition of the Indian subcontinent, he later migrated to Pakistan, Karachi along with his family in 1952. He did his schooling at the Government Islamia Science College, Karachi where one of his teachers dubbed him a "raconteur".

In 1961, he went to London where he started his professional career as an artist after taking part in evening classes at Saint Martin's School of Art. Prior to his involvement with paintings in London, he established an Urdu literary circle where he became known as "qissa-go" (storyteller) for his short story writings and tale-narrating.

In 2018, the Cultural Department of the government of Sindh opened an art gallery, Tassaduq Sohail Gallery in the National Museum of Pakistan aimed at displaying one hundred artwork of Sohail.

== Death ==
He was suffering from prolonged illness and was subsequently admitted to the Shifa International Hospital in Islamabad. He was later shifted to Dr. Ruth K. M. Pfau Civil Hospital Karachi for further medical treatment where he fell unconscious. The doctors reportedly couldn't collect his medical history as none of his family members were present at the hospital. On 2 October 2017, he died in the hospital.
