= Board of Intermediate and Secondary Education, Sahiwal =

Education board in Punjab, Pakistan

Education Board overview
- Formed: March 30, 2012
- Preceding agencies: Ministry of Education (Punjab); Higher Education Department, Govt. Of Punjab
- Jurisdiction: Includes Districts; Okara District; Sahiwal District; Pakpattan District
- Employees: 500+
- Education Board executive: Controller Of Examinations
- Website: www.bisesahiwal.edu.pk

The Board of Intermediate and Secondary Education, Sahiwal is the intermediate education control government body in Sahiwal Division. Its head-office is located in Sahiwal.

== History ==
The BISE was established on June 15, 2012, by the Higher Education Department (HED) of the Punjab. Before its establishment Sahiwal and Pakpattan were facilitating by the BISE Multan. Okara District was being facilitated by the BISE Lahore.

== Managing Body ==
The following shall be the officers of a Board:

1. Chairman
2. Secretary
3. Controller of Examination
4. Chief Secrecy Officer
5. Officer Confidential

== Branches ==
The secretary controls the following branches:

1. Admin Branch
2. Finance Branch
3. Audit Branch
4. Registration Branch
5. Vehicle Branch
6. Meeting Branch
7. Litigation Branch
8. Academic Branch
9. One Window Operation
10. Verification Branch
11. Store Branch

The Controller of Examination controls the following branches:

1. Matric Branch
2. Inter Branch
3. Conduct Branch
4. Secrecy Branch
5. Discipline Branch
6. Computer Section
7. Embossing Cell

== Jurisdiction ==
Jurisdiction of Sahiwal board include the following districts.

- Okara District
- Sahiwal District
- Pakpattan District

== See also ==
- List of educational boards in Pakistan
- Federal Board of Intermediate and Secondary Education
