= Jafar Shah =

Pakistani politician

Syed Jafar Shah

Member of the Khyber Pakhtunkhwa Assembly
- In office 18 February 2008 – 28 May 2018
- Constituency: PK-85 (Swat-VI)

Personal details
- Born: 10 March 1957 Swat District
- Party: Awami National Party (ANP)
- Children: Syed Qaiser Shah Syed Yasir Shah Syed Taimur Shah Syed Jalal Shah
- Occupation: Politician

Syed Jafar Shah is a Pakistani politician hailing from Swat District, affiliated with Awami National Party. He is a former member of the Khyber Pakhtunkhwa Assembly, from 2008 to 2018. He is a senior member of ANP's central and provincial councils, as well as the central working committee. He has held key roles in community development, worked with international organizations such as UNICEF and UN FAO, and led projects under SRSP and CARAVAN. He is also an Ashoka Fellow, Global Goodwill Ambassador, and the author of several studies on social development, forestry, and tourism.

== Political career ==
Shah is elected twice as a member of the Khyber Pakhtunkhwa Assembly on the ticket of the Awami National Party (ANP) from "PF-85 (Swat-VI) & PK-85 (Swat-VI) in the 2008 and 2013 Pakistani general elections. Within the Awami National Party (ANP), he served as Provincial Joint Secretary from 2011 to 2013 and later as Provincial Finance Secretary in 2013 under the interim setup. From 2008 to 2014, he was a member of the ANP Think Tank. He currently serves on ANP’s Central and Provincial Councils as well as its Provincial Working Committees.

== Early Life & Education ==
Shah was born in the Swat Valley and began his education at Government High School Madyan, completing his Secondary School Certificate (SSC) in 1973. He enrolled in Jehanzeb College Swat for his FSc the same year and later completed a BSc from the same institution in 1977–78. During his student years, he became actively involved in politics through the Pakhtun Students Federation and was arrested in 1977, spending over a month in jail due to his activism.

He was offered admission to a medical college in Afghanistan but chose not to pursue it. In 1978, he attended MSc Biology classes at Quaid-e-Azam University Islamabad, but could not continue due to personal reasons. In 1979–80, he enrolled in MSc Botany at Karachi University, attending one semester before leaving the program. He later pursued legal education and earned an LLB degree with first division from Islamia Law College Karachi in 1981–82.

== Early career ==
Shah began his professional career at Habib Bank Limited as Officer Grade III, where he completed a one-year training course at HBL Main Plaza Karachi. Worked as Research Assistant with Heidelberg university Germany to conduct study on socio economic conditions, culture and history of the people of Swat, Indus and Dir kohistan in 1977 and 1978. In 1983, he undertook a one-year apprenticeship as a lawyer at the District Courts in Swat. He got married in August 1983.

== Development Work ==
From 1984 to 1996, Shah served as Head of the Village Development Programme (VDP) Sector in the Swiss-aided Kalam Integrated Development Project (KIDP) in Swat. His experience in community development was enhanced by international training and exposure. He completed a course at Wageningen University in the Netherlands (1985–86) and received additional training in participatory development at Khonkaen University in Thailand and at IIED in London. In 1992, he visited the Institute of Development Studies at Sussex University and presented a paper on participatory development and its role in promoting democracy in Pakistan.

He also contributed to international development efforts. In 2006, he worked on a short-term consultancy for the UN Food and Agriculture Organization (FAO) in Gilgit. After the 2005 earthquake, he worked with CARAVAN and UNICEF on education revitalization projects in Azad Jammu and Kashmir. He also made various international study visits, including Sri Lanka (1991), Indonesia and Singapore (1994), Nepal (1998), the Philippines (2004), Thailand (2005–06), Germany and Belgium (1986), and the United States (2009). He visited several cities in the US including Washington, New Orleans, California, San Francisco, New York, and Houston. He also visited Oman and Jordan in 2010 and toured the parliaments of Scotland and California as part of exposure visits.

== NGO leadership and forestry ==
Between 1996 and 2004, Shah worked as the Regional Programme Manager for the Abbottabad Region in the Sarhad Rural Support Programme (SRSP). He then became the Executive Director of the NGO CARAVAN, serving from 2004 to 2007. He also completed a specialized course in Community Forestry at RECOFT, Thailand, in 2006.

== Political career ==
Shah was elected twice to the Provincial Assembly of Khyber Pakhtunkhwa, first in 2008 and again in 2013. Within the Awami National Party (ANP), he served as Provincial Joint Secretary from 2011 to 2013 and later as Provincial Finance Secretary in 2013 under the interim setup. From 2008 to 2014, he was a member of the ANP Think Tank. He currently serves on ANP’s Central and Provincial Councils as well as its Provincial Working Committees.

== Memberships and affiliations ==
Shah is actively involved in several professional and international networks. He is an Ashoka Fellow, a member of the Asia Forestry Network, and also a member of the International Network of Parliamentarians for Conflict Resolution based in Belgium. He has served on the boards of several non-governmental organizations.

== Publications ==
Shah has authored and co-authored several studies and training materials. His works include Behrain at a Glance (a socio-economic profile), ten training manuals on Social Mobilisation and Participatory Rural Appraisal (PRA), and detailed studies on NGO practices in Sri Lanka and microfinance approaches in Indonesia. He has also written about the impact of minor forest produce on poor communities in Gilgit. As a co-author, he contributed to the District Conservation Strategy for Abbottabad (IUCN), a management plan for Uchalli and Jabikee lakes in Chakwal aimed at protecting migratory birds, and PRA studies in Gujranwala, Khanewal, and Kalam (1993), focusing on tourism development.
