= Hyderabad Institute of Arts, Science and Technology =

- Motto in English: Knowledge is Power
- Type: Private
- Established: 1 August 2001
- Affiliations: HEC, University of Sindh, MUET,
- Chancellor: Governor of Sindh
- Director: Col Muhammad Khalid Khan
- Location: Hyderabad, Sindh, Pakistan
- Website: www.hiast.edu.pk

Hyderabad Institute of Arts, Science and Technology (Sindhi: حيدرآباد انسٽيٽيوٽ آف آرٽس، سائنس اينڊ ٽيڪنالاجي) or HiAST is a private degree awarding institution located in Hyderabad, Pakistan. It was established on 1 August 2001, and in February 2013 was chartered under The Hyderabad Institute of Arts, Science and Technology Act, 2013. It has Higher Education Commission of Pakistan-recognized affiliations with both the University of Sindh and Mehran University of Engineering and Technology.

== College, Undergraduate and Graduate Courses ==
- SSC program affiliated with the Board of Intermediate and Secondary Education, Hyderabad
- HSC program affiliated with the Board of Intermediate and Secondary Education, Hyderabad
- BBA program affiliated with University of Sindh
- MBA program affiliated with University of Sindh
- BS (Information Technology) Program affiliated with Mehran University of Engineering and Technology
- MS (Information Technology) Program affiliated with Mehran University of Engineering and Technology
