= Ittehad-e-Tanzeemat-Madaris Pakistan =

Federation of associations representing Islamic Seminaries in Pakistan

- اتحاد تنظیمات مدارس پاکستان
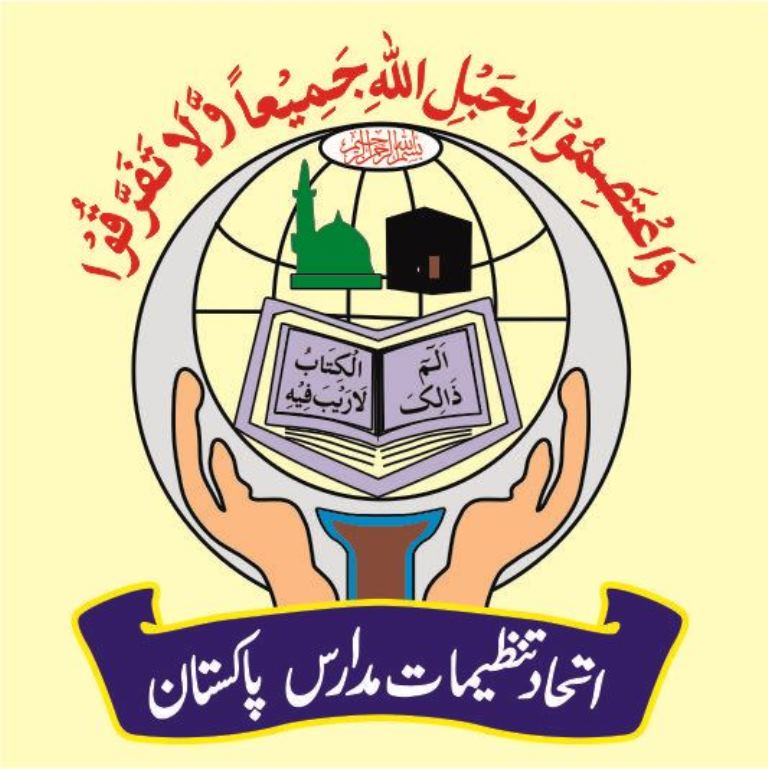
- Abbreviation: ITMP
- President: Taqi Usmani
- Nazim-e-Aala: Muneeb-ur-Rehman
- Spokesperson & Special Assistant: Muhammad Hanif Jalandhari
- Subsidiaries: Wifaq ul Madaris Al-Arabia; Tanzeem ul Madaris Ahl-e-Sunnat; Wafaq ul Madaris Al Salafiyyah; Rabta-ul-Madaris; Wifaq Ul Madaris Al-Shia

Ittehad-e-Tanzeemat-Madaris Pakistan is a federation of associations representing the madrassas (Islamic schools) of different schools of Islam in Pakistan. The five members are:

- Wifaq ul Madaris Al-Arabia
- Tanzeem ul Madaris Ahle Sunnat
- Wafaq Ul Madaris Al Salafia
- Rabta-ul-Madaris
- Wifaq Ul Madaris Al-Shia

== Presidents ==
- Abdur Razzaq Iskander (2017–2021)
- Taqi Usmani (2021–present)

== See also ==
- Madrassas in Pakistan
