= AJK Board of Intermediate and Secondary Education, Mirpur =

Examination board in Mirpur, AJK

The Azad Jammu & Kashmir Board of Intermediate and Secondary Education (AJKBISE) was established in 1973 through an ordinance promulgated by the Government of Azad Kashmir. It is located in Mirpur, Azad Kashmir. Before the establishment of the AJK BISE, educational institutes in Azad Kashmir were included in the jurisdiction of the Board of Intermediate and Secondary Education, Lahore.

The first examination was conducted by this Board in 1974, in which 6,161 candidates of Secondary School Certificate (SSC) & Higher Secondary School Certificate (HSSC) appeared. The scope of its activities gradually increased. The rules and regulations of Board of Intermediate and Secondary Education, Lahore have been adopted on the principle of parity with Punjab.

== See also ==
- List of educational boards in Pakistan
- List of institutions of higher education in Azad Kashmir
