= Ra'ana Liaquat Ali Khan Government College of Home Economics =

Coordinates: 24.891°N 67.076°E

Ra'ana Liaquat Ali Khan, Government College of Home Economics (RLAK CHE)
- دانش کدہ رعنا لیاقت علی خان برائے علومِ خانگی معاشیات
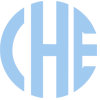
- Type: Degree College
- Established: 1952
- Affiliations: Board of Intermediate Education Karachi and University of Karachi
- Principal: Dr. Rubina Hakeem (from March 2004 to September 2012 and 8 April 2016 to date) Professor Shabana Perwaiz Sandila (from 2013 to 7 April 2016)
- Academic staff: Home Economics
- Location: Karachi, Sindh, Pakistan
- Campus: 25 acres (approx.)
- Website: http://chek.edu.pk/

The Ra'ana Liaquat Ali Khan Government College of Home Economics (also known as RLAK CHE) (Urdu: دانش کدہَ رعنا لیاقت علی خان برائے علومِ معاشیاتِ خانگی) is an all-girls college, established in 1952 in Karachi, Pakistan. RLAK-CHE is a professional-level college offering numerous highly specialized and technical courses in five different areas of Home Economics – i.e. Apparel & Textiles, Art & Design, Family & Human Development, Nutrition & Dietetics, Residential Management & Entrepreneurship; – including internships and research projects in the senior-most year of studies that are a compulsory requirement for every student graduating from the college.

RLAK CHE also offers compulsory education in Language, Literature, History, Religion, Statistics and Computing to enhance and add to professional and transferable skills of young girl-students.

== History ==
A landmark educational institution of Karachi— RLAK Govt. College of Home Economics has a proud history. The Government of Pakistan proposed the idea for the establishment of a college of home economics in Karachi as part of its first-ever six-year Development Plan of Education (1951–1957) shortly after Independence, realizing the necessity and importance of investing in the education of the young women of the country.

In 2010, the Education Department of Government of Sindh decided to handover the administration of the already established college to Zindagi Trust Foundation run by singer/humanitarian Shehzad Roy which was contrary to the NGO's objective of upgrading and renovating colleges that are under-developed and lack basic administration capabilities. This move was met by severe opposition by the student body and staff members including teachers. It was followed by a series of protest by teachers and students on roads and led to the intervention of Governor Sindh Ishrat-Ul-Ibad who condemned the move by the Education Department. The Sindh Professors and Lecturers Association also condemned the handover and announced that it would initiate strikes throughout the province if the handover was not reversed. What made the issue so sensitive was that it was a girls-only college that would come under the administration of an NGO who had no prior experience of running such a large institution as well as the fact that the college was already being efficiently run by administration whose members were alumni of the college itself and had teaching experience over there as well. At the time the college had recently been renovated by the government's works department during which all the departments including the administration block and so the need for external intervention was not felt. Moreover, the land value of the college made the issue even more controversial since the college land occupies an area of over 24 acres and lies in one of the most expensive localities of the city.

=== Vision of Ford Foundation ===
Establishment of Ra'ana Liaquat Ali Khan, Government College of Home Economics (RLAK CHE), Karachi started in 1952 with support from the Ford Foundation (United States) and APWA. Ford Foundation provided all the funds for building, books and training of staff while Pakistan Government provided the land. APWA was an active member of the governing council and an administrative liaison between Ford Foundation and Pakistan Government. Oklahoma State University-United States assisted in making of curriculum and syllabi, establishment of the college, and training of teachers in Karachi.

=== Name & Foundation Stone ===
Its name at that time was Domestic Science College. Eleanor Roosevelt installed the foundation stone of the College.

=== Administrative Controls ===
The College worked as a semi independent public institution under the management of a governing council. Federal government paid the salaries of staff and provided budget for the running of the college.

The first batch of students was admitted in 1955. Masters education started in RLAK CHE Karachi in 1961. The Board of Intermediate Education, Karachi was responsible for examining intermediate students and University of Karachi for graduate and post graduate students. The staff were sent off for overseas training till 1971.

RLAK CHE was taken over by the government as part of its nationalization policy for educational institutions in 1972. The provincial government supported the college by constructing new blocks of buildings in 1991 and initiating a renovation scheme in 2005.

== Contributions of the Private Sector ==
Over the years, the College Administration and Faculty have worked tirelessly and selflessly in motivating the interest of private individuals, companies, industries, groups, etc. to make their due contribution to the promotion of girls’ education by providing/improving various facilities for the students of the College.

As a result, RLAK-CHE has been provided with great support in establishment and enrichment of labs, temporary provision of teachers, award of medals, provision of books, building of auditorium, and extension of library.

== Programs Offered ==
The two scholastic programmes currently being offered by the College are

- H. Sc in Home Economics (Two Years)
- BS in Home Economics (Four Years)

The College is affiliated to the Board of Intermediate Education Karachi and University of Karachi for award of certificate and degree of H. Sc and BS in Home Economics respectively. The four-year BS program is equivalent to master's degree as per University rules. The BS Programme brings the scholastic programme in conformity with those offered internationally. The curriculum and syllabi developed most painstakingly by the faculty of the college meet the highest of standards and have been appreciated both at national and international levels.

=== Courses ===
A large number of highly specialized courses are included in the curriculum for the two scholastic programmes at present being taught at the College. A total of 83 different courses are taught at the College of which 69 are of a highly specialized and technical nature. Moreover, an important point to note is that most of these special subjects are taught only at RLAK CHE in Karachi.

==== Courses Offered at Intermediate Level (H.Sc.) ====
S.NO.	Courses (Intermediate)	Grade
1	Nutrition & Dietetics: Food & Nutrition; Meal Management	XI XII
2	Apparel & Textiles Clothing & Textiles/ Family Clothing Problems	XI
3	Arts & Interior Design Related Arts	XI
4	Family & Human Development Family Relations and Child Development	XII
5	Residential Management & Entrepreneurship Home Management	XII
6	Science: Chemistry; Microbiology; Physics	XII XI; XII
7	Humanities: English; Urdu; Pakistan Studies; Islamic Studies	XI & XII XI & XII; XII; XI

==== Courses Offered at Graduation Level (BS) ====
Nutrition & Dietetics	Arts & Interior Design	Residential Management & Entrepreneurship	Apparel & Textiles	Family & Human Development	Science	Information Technology	Humanities
i. Public Health Nutrition I & II (BS-Yr 1)	i. Art & Design in Daily Life I & II (BS-Yr 1)	i. Home Economics Education/Consumer Science (BS-Yr 1)	i. Advanced Clothing/Textiles I & II (BS-Yr 2)	i. Social Sciences I & II (BS-Yr 2)	i. Chemistry (BS-Yr 1)	i. Statistics (BS-Yr 2 & 3)	i. Functional English I & II (BS-Yr-1)
ii. Experimental Foods & Processing Techniques I & II (BS-Yr 3)	ii. Fundamentals of Interior Design I & II (BS-Yr 3)	ii. Home Management & Housing I & II (BS-Yr 2)	ii. Marketing & Merchandising I & II (BS-Yr 3)	ii. Human Development I & II (BS-Yr 2)	ii. Bio Chemistry (BS-Yr 1)	ii. Computing (BS-Yr 2)	ii. Urdu (BS-Yr 2)
iii. Institutional Management & Catering I & II (BS-Yr 3)	iii. History of Architecture (BS-Yr 3)	iii. Essentials of Management I & II (BS-Yr 3)	iii. Fashion & Apparel Designing I & II (BS-Yr 3)	iii. Early Childhood Education & Administration I & II (BS-Yr 3)	iii. Physiology (BS-Yr 2)		iii. Pakistan Studies (BS-Yr 1)
iv. Advanced Nutrition I & II (BS-Yr 3)	iv. Islamic Art & Architecture (BS-Yr 3)	iv. Management of Living Spaces I & II (BS-Yr 3)	iv. Experimental Textiles I & II (BS-Yr 3)	vi. Family & Community Development I & II (BS-Yr 3)			iv. Islamic Studies (BS-Yr-1)
v. Dietetics I & II (BS-Yr 4)	v. Colour in Interior (BS-Yr 3)	v. Management of Residential Spaces I & II (BS-Yr 3)	v. Textile Designing I & II (BS-Yr 4)	v. Guidance and Counselling I & II (BS-Yr 3)			
vi. Nutrition through Life Cycle I & II (BS-Yr 4)	vi. Furniture in Interior (BS-Yr 3)	vi. Fundamentals of Marketing (BS-Yr 3)	vi. Fashion Merchandising I & II (BS-Yr 4)	vi. Gerontology & Ageing (BS-Yr 4)			
vii. Nutrition in Diabetes & Metabolic Syndrome (BS-Yr 4)	vii. Art Appreciation (BS-Yr 4)	vii. Home Economics Education (BS-Yr 3)	vii. Textile Chemistry I & II (BS-Yr 4)	vii. Special Children & Rehabilitation (BS-Yr 4)			
viii. Nutritional Epidemiology (BS-Yr 4)	viii. Interior Design Standards (BS-Yr 4)	viii. Teaching Home Economics (BS- Yr 3)	viii. Pattern Making (BS-Yr 4)	viii. Educational Psychology I & II (BS-Yr 4)			
ix. Emergencey Nutrition (BS-Yr 4)	ix. Art Education (BS-Yr 4)	ix. Management of Institutions I & II (BS-Yr 4)	ix. Internships A, B, C (BS-Yr 4)	ix. Crises Management in Families (BS-Yr 4)			
x. Internships A, B, C (BS-Yr 4)	x. Arts & Crafts in Interior Decoration (BS-Yr 4)	x. Human Resource Management I & II (BS-Yr 4)	x. Research Project (BS-Yr 4)	x. Family Ecology (BS-Yr 4)			
xi. Research Project (BS-Yr 4)	xi. Computer Aided Design (BS-Yr 4)	xi. Environmental Management (BS-Yr 4)		xi. Personality & Behaviour (BS-Yr 4)			
	xii. Art in Pakistan (BS-Yr 4)	xii. Project Management (BS-Yr 4)		xii. Internships A, B, C (BS-Yr 4)			
	xiii. Internships A, B, C (BS-Yr 4)	xiii. Research Methodology (BS-Yr 4)		xiii. Research Project (BS-Yr 4)			
	xiv. Research Project (BS-Yr 4)	xiv. Internships A, B, C (BS-Yr 4)					
		xv. Research Project (BS-Yr 4)					

== Buildings ==
RLAK CHE is spread over a sprawling 25 acres (approx.) of land interspersed with various buildings and large areas of vacant land. The physical infrastructure and facilities are on the scale of a university campus rather than a college. The college has:

- six academic blocks;
- a hostel;
- an administrative block;
- a well-stocked library;
- principal’s bungalow; and
- employee residences.

RLAK, CHE has two well-equipped computer labs with access to internet; a spacious auditorium and multimedia facilities for use in academic and extracurricular activities.

Other physical facilities of the College include student-residence blocks (part of the curriculum requirement for the subject of Residential Management), an audio-visual conference room, seminar halls, badminton hall, cafeteria, bookshop, and a photocopy shop.

== Discipline ==
RLAK, CHE has an exemplary discipline. In terms of regularity of classes and punctuality of student and staff the college has unmatched high standards.

For all the subjects of Home-Economics students get all the required teaching at the college and do not need any private tuition.

There is an excellent system of documentation of student and staff performance that is a great help in monitoring and maintaining discipline and academic standards.

== See also ==
- Ra'ana Liaquat Ali Khan
- List of colleges in Pakistan
- University of Home Economics
