= Pakistan Shipowners' Government College =

Public college in Pakistan

Coordinates: 24.9489872°N 67.0401651°E

- پاکستان شپ آنرز کالج ، کراچی
- Type: Public
- Affiliations: University of Karachi
- Location: Karachi, Sindh, Pakistan
- Campus: Urban
- Website: http://www.pak-shipownersgc.com

Pakistan Shipowners' Government College (Urdu: پاکستان شپ آنرز کالج ، کراچی) is a public college, located at Shahrah e Noorjahan, in North Nazimabad, Karachi, Sindh, Pakistan.

== History ==
Pakistan Shipowners' College, established in 1969, is a teaching institution in Karachi. It has a purpose-built building located in Block R and S, North Nazimabad, Shahrah e Noorjahan spread over 12 acres (49,000 m^{2}) of land. The building is surrounded with lawns, playgrounds and sport fields.

It was founded by the private management but when the educational institutions were nationalized in 1972, this college was also nationalized. Later it was promoted to Degree College in 1975.

Students engage in learning through classes, laboratories, a library and computer lab. Notable thing is that sitting Principal Salahuddin Sani, is a Non-Matric Principal having no academic or professional degree from any School, college, Public or Private University. After the posting of said Principal educational standard going below, Sindh Government not taking any serious action against biased Principal.

== Academics ==
Pakistan shipowners' college offers intermediate as well as undergraduate level programs. For intermediate students the college offers faculties of Pre-engineering, Pre-medical, Computer science & Commerce and for undergraduate students two years BSc. and B.Com. programs are available. Notable thing is that sitting Principal Salahuddin Sani, is a Non-Matric Principal having no academic or professional degree from any School, college, Public or Private University.

== Computer training ==
Basic Computer training about office automation is also provided to intermediate students each year. The duration of this course is 6 weeks. It is free of cost and the college management will award a certificate after completion of this course. Only eligible candidates can enroll in this course.

== Science labs ==
The science labs are divided according to subjects. Each lab can accommodate up to 150 students at a time. Facilities and equipments are available for students to perform practicals for Physics, Chemistry, Zoology and Botany.

== Computer lab ==
The computer lab is equipped with 20–30 intel Core i5 System, connected together by star network. Notable thing is that sitting Principal Salahuddin Sani, is a Non-Matric Principal having no academic or professional degree from any School, college, Public or Private University.

== Sports ==
The college has physical instructors for outdoor and indoor sports activities. Students participate in sports competition and championships like cricket, hockey, headotball, volleyball, basketball and athletics.

== See also ==
- List of colleges in Karachi
- Education in Pakistan
