= Board of Intermediate and Secondary Education, Larkana =

Education board in Sindh, Pakistan

- هیئت مدیره تعلیم و تربیه متوسطه و دبیرستانی، لارکانا

Agency overview
- Formed: 1995
- Jurisdiction: Includes* Larkana District* Kamber and Shahdad Kot District* Shikarpur District* Jacobabad District* Kashmore District*
- Agency executives: Syed Ali Shah Bukhari, Chairman; Mr. Rasool Bux Samo, Secretary
- Website: biselrk.edu.pk

The Board of Intermediate and Secondary Education, Larkana (BISE Larkana) is an educational board located in Larkana, Sindh, Pakistan.

== Jurisdiction ==
The jurisdiction of Larkana Board includes following districts:

- Larkana District
- Kamber and Shahdad Kot District
- Shikarpur District
- Jacobabad District
- Kashmore District

== See also ==
- List of educational boards in Pakistan
- Federal Board of Intermediate and Secondary Education
