= Board of Intermediate and Secondary Education, Swat =

Government educational board in Swat, Pakistan

- د منځني او ثانوي زده کړو هیئت، سوات

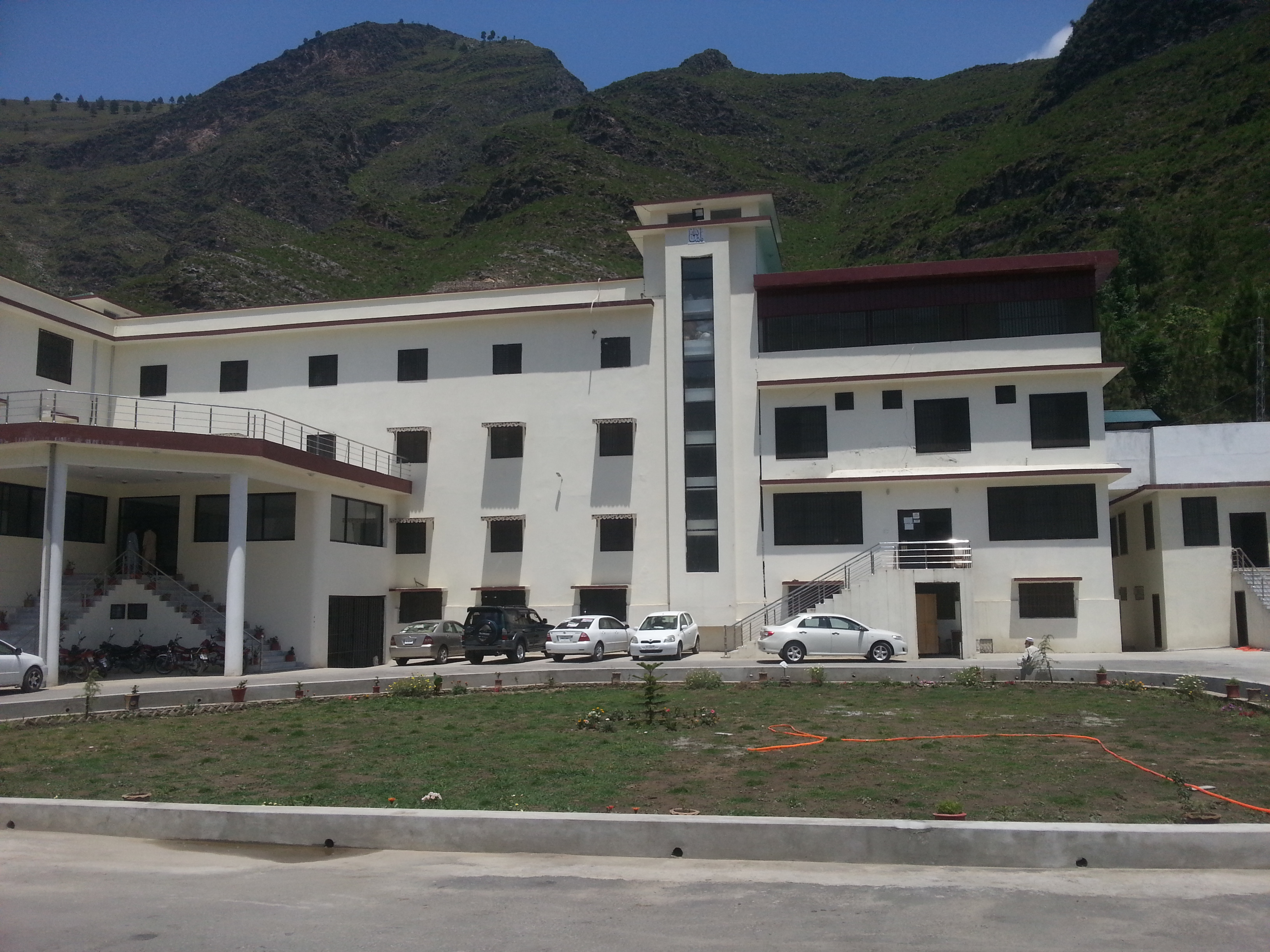
- Swat District, Khyber Pakhtunkhwa, Pakistan

Information
- Established: 1991
- Chairman: Prof. Tasbih Ullah
- Website: http://www.bisess.edu.pk/site/

The Board of Intermediate and Secondary Education, Swat (Pashto: د بورډ آف انټرمیډیټ اینډ سیکنډری ایجوکیشن سوات) or BISE Swat is an educational governmental body in Swat, formed in 1991,it is responsible for conducting and managing secondary (Grade 9 and Grade 10, with exams referred to as SSC-I for Grade 9 and SSC-II for Grade 10) and intermediate (Grade 11 and Grade 12, with exams referred to as HSSC-I for Grade 11 and HSSC-II for Grade 12) level examsas well as register the educational institutions within its jurisprudence. It is headed by Umar Hussain as secretary and Alyan Khan as chairman.

== History ==
Before BISE Swat's establishment, matriculation and intermediate examinations in Swat were managed by the University of Peshawar until 1961, and later by BISE Peshawar. In 1991, BISE Swat was formed to decentralize educational administration and cater specifically to the needs of students in Swat and surrounding areas.

== Jurisdiction ==
The following Districts are included in the autonomy of BISE Swat;

- Swat District
- Shangla
- Buner

== See also ==
- List of educational boards in Pakistan
- Board of Intermediate and Secondary Education, Peshawar
