= Board of Intermediate and Secondary Education, Bannu =

Government body in Pakistan

- د منځني او ثانوي زده کړو هیئت، بنو

Agency overview
- Formed: 1990
- Jurisdiction: Bannu; Lakki Marwat; North Waziristan; South Waziristan
- Headquarters: Bannu Township, Bannu; 32°59′10″N 70°36′15″E
- Website: www.biseb.edu.pk

Board of Intermediate and Secondary Education, Bannu is the Intermediate Education Governmental body in Khyber Pakhtunkhwa, Pakistan. It is authorized with financial and administrative authority to organize, manage, regulate, develop and control intermediate and secondary education in general and accomplish examinations in the institutions affiliated with it. BISE Bannu came into being as a result of the bifurcation of the Peshawar Board in 1990 under the North West Frontier Province Board of Intermediate and Secondary Education Act 1990. The BISE Bannu is the responsible for control, organization and regulation of intermediate and secondary education of more than 700 educational institutions in public as well as private sector in Bannu District.

== Jurisdiction ==
Jurisdiction of BISE Bannu includes three districts and two agencies:

- District Bannu
- District Lakki Marwat
- North Waziristan Agency

== See also ==
- List of educational boards in Pakistan
- Education in Pakistan
- Education in Khyber Pakhtunkhwa
