= Telangana State Board of Intermediate Education =

Board of education in Telangana, India

Telangana Board of Intermediate Education
- Telangana Board of Intermediate Education logo
- Formation: 2014 (12 years ago)
- Type: Board of Intermediate Education, Hyderabad
- Headquarters: Hyderabad, Telangana, India
- Location: Vidhya Bhavan, Nampally, Hyderabad, Telangana
- Official language: Telugu; Urdu; English; Hindi
- Website: Telangana Board of Intermediate Education

The Telangana Board of Intermediate Education (TGBIE) is a Board of Intermediate education in Telangana, India

The board of Intermediate formerly known as Andhra Pradesh Board of Intermediate Education, after separation of Telangana from Andhra Pradesh it regulates and supervises the system of intermediate education in Telangana . It executes and governs various activities that include devising of courses of study, prescribing syllabus, conducting examinations, granting affiliations to colleges arnd, providing direction, support and leadership for all educational institutions under its jurisdiction.

Honourable Minister of the State for Secondary Education acts as chairman and secretary to Government, Secondary Education as vice-chairman of the board. The secretary of I.A.S. Rank acts as the chief executive of the board.

The Board of Intermediate Education provides two term of course duration after the completion of Secondary School or 10th Class Examination.

== Pattern ==
The Intermediate Public Examination is being conducted since 1978–79 both at the end of 1st year course and at the end of 2nd year course. Earlier the Public Examination was only at the end of 2nd year. The candidates are examined in Part-I English, Part-II Second Language and Part-III Group subjects as follows:

- for 500 marks in 1st year and 500 marks in 2nd year in Arts and commerce Group
- 475 marks in HEG group
- 470 marks in 1st year and 530 marks in 2nd year in MPC group
- 440 marks in 1st year and 560 Marks in 2nd year for the Bi.P.C. group.

The percentage of pass marks in each paper is 35. The division in which the candidates are placed is decided on the basis of their passing all the papers in the 1st year and in the 2nd year. The final results are announced by adding 1st year and 2nd year marks together.

== Syllabus ==
The Board of Intermediate Education, Telangana, Hyderabad is offering a multitude of academic programmes. With a view to give greater impetus to the academic aspects of the board, a separate academic wing called "Educational Research and Training Wing" was created. The board enjoys the prerogative right of prescribing textbooks of two year Intermediate course.

The board offers the following subjects

- Part I – English.
- Part II – Second Languages (Telugu, Hindi, Sanskrit, Urdu, Arabic, French, Tamil, Kannada, Oriya and Marathi);
- Part III – Optional Subjects (Mathematics, Physics, Chemistry, Botany, Zoology, Commerce, Economics, Civics, History, Public Administration, Geography and Geology);
- Modern Language Subjects (English, Telugu, Hindi and Urdu);

The syllabus of language subjects and optional subjects is structured by concerned Subject Committees constituted by the Board. The committees also undertake a revision of syllabus and its updates keeping the changes and current trends in view.

== Results ==
- 2024 - First year: 60.01% pass; Second year: 64.19% pas

s

- 2023 - First year: 61.68% pass; Second year: 63.49% pass

== See also ==
- Telangana Board of Secondary Education
