= Temporary exhibitions at the Royal Academy =

This article contains a partial list of temporary exhibitions mounted at the Royal Academy (RA) in London. Only major lending exhibitions are listed: shorter-term events such as the London Original Print Fair are not included, nor are the annual Royal Academy Summer Exhibitions.

Note: the list is known to be incomplete prior to 1987.

In addition to its main galleries behind Burlington House, The RA has additional galleries within the Sackler Wing. Sitting above Burlington House, these galleries (formerly the Diploma galleries) were incorporated within the main building in a scheme designed by Foster Associates. The first exhibition held in these galleries, incorporating the humidity and light controls required of modern exhibition spaces, was the Fauve Landscape in 1991.

== History ==
The RA has held a Summer exhibition every year since 1769, the year after it was founded. For the first 100 years of its existence, this was the only exhibition held each year. In 1870, coinciding with its move to Burlington House, the RA began organising an annual loan exhibition of Old Masters and works by recently deceased British artists, known from its inception and for many years as the Winter Exhibition. After World War 1 the Winter Exhibitions programme became far more ambitious and included major surveys of Italian, Dutch, Flemish, Spanish, French, Persian and British art. Since 2013, the RA has made digitized catalogues of the pre-1939 exhibitions freely available on its website.

== Exhibitions ==
| Dates open to the public | Title | Location |
|---|---|---|
| 18 March 2014 to 8 June 2014 | Renaissance Impressions | Sackler Wing |
| 25 January 2014 to 6 April 2014 | Sensing Spaces: Architecture Reimagined | Main Galleries |
| 7 November 2013 to 16 February 2014 | Bill Woodrow RA | Burlington Gardens |
| 29 October 2013 to 26 January 2014 | Daumier (1808–1879): Visions of Paris | Sackler Wing |
| 21 September 2013 to 8 December 2013 | Australia | Main Galleries |
| 18 July 2013 to 13 October 2013 | Richard Rogers RA: Inside Out | Burlington Gardens |
| 6 July 2013 to 29 September 2013 | Mexico: A Revolution in Art, 1910–1940 | Sackler Wing |
| 16 March 2013 to 9 June 2013 | George Bellows (1882–1925): Modern American Life | Sackler Wing |
| 26 January 2013 to 14 April 2013 | Manet: Portraying Life | Main Galleries |
| 13 December 2012 to 17 February 2013 | Mariko Mori: Rebirth | Burlington Gardens |
| 8 December 2012 to 17 February 2013 | Constable, Gainsborough, Turner and the Making of Landscape | Majedski Fine Rooms |
| 15 September 2012 to 9 December 2012 | Bronze | Main Galleries |
| 7 July 2012 to 23 September 2012 | From Paris: A taste for impressionism. Paintings from the Clark | Sackler Wing |
| 10 March 2012 to 10 June 2012 | Johan Zoffany RA: Society observed | Sackler Wing |
| 21 January 2012 to 9 April 2012 | David Hockney RA: A bigger picture | Main Galleries |
| 29 October 2011 to 22 January 2012 | Building the revolution: Soviet art and architecture 1915–1935 | Sackler Wing |
| 17 September 2011 to 11 December 2011 | Degas and the ballet: picturing movement | Main Galleries |
| 30 June 2011 to 2 October 2011 | Eyewitness: Hungarian photography in the 20th century. Brassai, Capa, Kertész, Moholy-Nagy, Munkacsi | Sackler Wing |
| 12 March 2011 to 5 June 2011 | Watteau: the drawings | Sackler Wing |
| 22 January 2011 to 7 April 2011 | Modern British Sculpture | Main Galleries |
| 30 October 2010 to 23 January 2011 | Pioneering Painters: The Glasgow Boys 1880–1900 | Sackler Wing |
| 25 September 2010 to 12 December 2010 | Treasures from Budapest: European masterpieces from Leonardo to Schiele | Main Galleries |
| 10 July 2010 to 26 September 2010 | Sargent and the sea | Sackler Wing |
| 13 March 2010 to 13 June 2010 | Paul Sandby RA (1731–1809): Picturing Britain. A Bicentenary exhibition | Sackler Wing |
| 23 January 2010 to 18 April 2010 | The real Van Gogh: the artist and his letters | Main galleries |
| 24 October 2010 to 24 January 2010 | Wild thing: Epstein, Gaudier-Brzeska, Gill | Sackler Wing |
| 26 September 2009 to 11 December 2009 | Anish Kapoor | Main galleries |
| 27 June 2009 to 13 September 2009 | J.W. Waterhouse | Sackler Wing |
| 21 March 2009 to 7 June 2009 | Kuniyoshi | Sackler Wing |
| 31 January 2009 to 13 April 2009 | Andrea Palladio: his life and legacy | Main galleries |
| 25 October 2008 to 22 March 2009 | Byzantium 330–1453 | Main galleries |
| 4 October 2008 to 2 January 2009 | Miro, Calder, Giacometti, Braque: Aime Maeght and his artists | Sackler Wing |
| 28 June to 7 September 2008 | Vilhelm Hammershoi | Sackler Wing |
| 8 March 2008 to 8 June 2008 | Cranach | Sackler Wing |
| 26 January to 18 April 2008 | From Russia | Main galleries |
| 20 October 2007 to 27 January 2008 | An American's passion for British Art: Paul Mellon's legacy | Sackler Wing |
| 22 September 2007 to 9 December 2007 | Georg Baselitz | Main galleries |
| 15 September 2007 to 2 December 2008 | Making History: Antiquaries in Britain 1707–2007 | Main galleries |
| 7 July 2007 to 30 September 2007 | Impressionists by the sea | Sackler Wing |
| 17 March 2007 to 10 June 2007 | The unknown Monet: pastels and drawings | Sackler Wing |
| 3 February 2007 to 20 April 2007 | Citizens and kings: portraits in the age of revolution | Main galleries |
| 11 November 2006 to 25 February 2007 | Chola: Sacred bronzes of Southern India | Sackler Wing |
| 13 September 2006 to 1 January 2007 | Rodin | Main galleries |
| 8 July 2006 to 15 October 2006 | Modigliani and his models | Sackler Wing |
| 25 February 2006 to 4 June 2006 | Jacob von Ruisdael: Master of landscape | Sackler Wing |
| 12 November 2005 to 17 April 2006 | China: the three emperors 1662–1795 | Main galleries |
| 1 October 2005 to 11 December 2005 | Edvard Munch by himself | Main galleries & Sackler Wing |
| 2 July 2005 to 11 September 2005 | Impressionism abroad | Sackler Wing |
| 5 March 2005 to 30 May 2005 | Matisse, his art and his textiles | Sackler Wing |
| 22 January 2005 to 12 April 2005 | Turks | Main galleries |
| 30 October 2004 to 23 January 2005 | William Nicholson (1872–1949) | Sackler Wing |
| 28 September 2004 to 10 December 2004 | Ancient art to post-impressionism | Main galleries |
| 15 May 2004 to 30 August 2004 | Tamara de Lempicka | Sackler Wing |
| 31 January to 18 April 2004 | Vuillard | Main galleries |
| 24 January 2004 to 12 April 2004 | The art of Philip Guston | Main galleries |
| 29 November 2003 to 22 February 2004 | Illuminating the Renaissance | Sackler Wing |
| 20 September 2003 to 12 December 2003 | Pre-raphaelite and other masters | Main galleries |
| 9 October 2003 to 9 November 2003 | Craigie Aitchison | Sackler Wing |
| 18 October 2003 to 15 February 2004 | Giorgio Armani | Burlington Gardens |
| 28 June 2003 to 21 September 2003 | Kirchner: Expressionism and the city | Sackler Wing |
| 15 March 2003 to 8 June 2003 | Masterpieces from Dresden | Sackler Wing |
| 16 November 2002 to 11 April 2003 | Aztecs | Main galleries |
| 14 September to 24 November 2002 | Masters of colour: Derain to Kandinski | Sackler Wing |
| 26 April 2002 to 14 July 2002 | Return of the Buddha: the Qingzhou discoveries | Sackler Wing |
| 14 March 2002 to 12 April 2002 | Tilson: pop to present | Sackler Wing |
| 26 January 2002 to 19 April 2002 | Paris: Capital of the Arts 1900–1968 | Main galleries |
| 24 November 2001 to 17 February 2002 | The dawn of the floating world (1650–1765) | Sackler Wing |
| 22 September 2001 to 16 December 2001 | Rembrandt's Women | Main galleries |
| 14 September 2001 to 12 December 2001 | Frank Auerbach: Paintings and drawings 1954–2001 | Main galleries |
| 30 June 2001 to 24 September 2001 | Ingres to Matisse: Masterpieces of French Painting | Sackler Wing |
| 17 March 2001 to 10 June 2001 | Boticelli's Dante: The drawings for the divine comedy | Sackler Wing |
| 20 January 2001 to 16 April 2001 | The genius of Rome 1592–1623 | Main galleries |
| 2 December 2000 to 18 February 2001 | Turner: The great watercolours | Sackler Wing |
| 12 October 2000 to 12 November 2000 | Terry Frost: six decades | Sackler Wing |
| 23 September 2000 to 15 December 2000 | Apocalypse: Beauty and horror in contemporary art | Main galleries |
| 30 June 2000 to 24 September 2000 | The Scottish colourists 1900–1930: Peploe, Fergusson, Hunter and Cadell | Sackler Wing |
| 11 March 2000 to 29 May 2000 | Chardin 1699–1779 | Sackler Wing |
| 16 January 2000 to 3 April 2000 | 1900: Art at the crossroads | Main galleries |
| 13 November 1999 to 6 February 2000 | Amazons of the avant-garde: six Russian artists | Sackler Wing |
| 30 September 1999 to 31 October 1999 | John Hoyland RA | Sackler Wing |
| 11 September 1999 to 3 December 1999 | John Soane: Architect | Main galleries |
| 11 September 1999 to 10 December 1999 | Van Dyck 1599–1641 | Main galleries |
| 22 July 1999 to 16 September 1999 | Joseph Beuys drawings: the secret block | Sackler wing |
| 14 April 1999 to 4 July 1999 | Kandinsky: Watercolours and other works on paper | Sackler Wing |
| 23 January 1999 to 18 April 1999 | Monet in the 20th century | Main galleries |
| 17 November 1998 to 20 December 1998 | 100 masterpieces of imperial Chinese ceramics from the Au Bak Ling collection | Main galleries |
| 22 October 1998 to 17 January 1999 | Life? or theatre? The work of Charlotte Salamon | Sackler Wing |
| 1 October 1998 to 1 November 1998 | Beyond minimalism: recent architecture of Tadao Ando | Main galleries |
| 17 September 1998 to 16 December 1998 | Picasso: Painter and sculptor in clay | Main galleries |
| 2 July 1998 to 4 October 1998 | Chagall: Love and the stage | Sackler Wing |
| 19 March 1998 to 14 June 1998 | The art of holy Russia: Icons from Moscow 1400–1660 | Sackler Wing |
| 22 January 1998 to 13 April 1998 | The art treasures of England: the regional collections | Main galleries |
| 13 November 1997 to 8 February 1998 | Victorian Fairy Painting | Sackler Wing |
| 18 September 1997 to 28 December 1997 | Sensation: Young British artists from the Saatchi collection | Main galleries |
| 3 July 1997 to 28 September 1997 | Hiroshige: images of mist, rain, moon and snow | Sackler Wing |
| 20 March 1997 to 8 June 1997 | The Berlin of George Grosz: Drawings, Watercolours and Prints 1912–1930 | Sackler Wing |
| 6 February 1997 to 16 March 1997 | Denys Lasdun | Main galleries |
| 6 February 1997 to 2 March 1997 | Gillian Ayres RA | Sackler galleries |
| 23 January 1997 to 6 April 1997 | Georges Braque: The late works | Main galleries |
| 9 October 1996 to 1 January 1997 | Alberto Giacometti 1901–1966 | Main galleries |
| 9 November 1996 to 23 January 1997 | From Mantegna to Picasso: Drawings from the Thaw collection | Sackler Wing |
| 26 September 1996 to 5 January 1997 | Living Bridges | Main galleries |
| 11 July 1996 to 22 September 1996 | Roger de Grey | Sackler Wing |
| 28 March 1996 to 23 June 1996 | Gustave Caillebotte, the unknown impressionist | Sackler Wing |
| 16 February 1996 to 21 April 1996 | Frederic Leighton, 1830–1896 | Main galleries |
| 9 November 1995 to 28 January 1996 | David Hockney: A drawing retrospective | Sackler Wing |
| 4 October 1995 to 21 January 1996 | Africa: Art of a continent | Main galleries |
| 30 June 1995 to 8 October 1995 | From Manet to Gauguin: Masterpieces from Swiss Private Collections | Sackler Wing |
| 1 June 1995 to 11 June 1995 | Norman Adams RA: The fourteen stations of the Cross | Sackler Wing |
| 17 February 1995 to 21 May 1995 | Odilon Redon: Dreams and visions | Sackler Wing |
| 2 February 1995 to 2 April 1995 | The Palladian revival: Lord Burlington and his house and garden at Chiswick | Main galleries |
| 19 January 1995 to 9 April 1995 | Nicolas Poussin | Main galleries |
| 27 October 1994 to 22 January 1995 | The painted page: Italian Renaissance book illumination 1450–1550 | Sackler Wing |
| 15 September 1994 to 14 December 1994 | The Glory of Venice 1700–1800 | Main galleries |
| 7 July 1994 to 2 October 1994 | Impressionism to Symbolism: The Belgian Avant-Garde 1880–1900 | Sackler Wing |
| 17 March 1994 to 12 June 1994 | Goya: Truth and fantasy, the small paintings | Sackler Wing |
| 3 February 1994 to 3 March 1994 | Sandra Blow RA | Sackler Wing |
| 20 January 1994 to 6 April 1994 | In pursuit of the absolute: art of the ancient world, from the collection of George Ortiz | Main galleries |
| 14 January 1994 to 4 April 1994 | The unknown Modigliani | Main galleries |
| 30 October 1993 to 23 January 1994 | Drawings from the J Paul Getty Museum | Sackler Wing |
| 16 September 1993 to 12 December 1993 | American Art in the 20th Century | Main galleries |
| 2 July 1993 to 10 October 1993 | Pissarro: Impressionist in the City | Sackler Wing |
| 11 March 1993 to 6 June 1993 | Georges Rouault: The early years 1903–1920 | Sackler Wing |
| 15 January 1993 to 11 April 1993 | The great age of British Watercolours 1750–1880 | Main galleries |
| 20 November 1992 to 14 February 1993 | Sickert: Paintings | Main galleries |
| 5 November 1992 to 20 December 1992 | Tom Phillips RA | Sackler Wing |
| 18 September 1992 to 14 December 1992 | Wisdom and compassion: the sacred art of Tibet | Main galleries |
| 3 July 1992 to 18 October 1992 | Alfred Sisley 1839–1899 | Sackler Wing |
| 17 January 1992 to 5 April 1992 | Andrea Mantegna | Main galleries |
| 13 March 1992 to 7 June 1992 | Alexander Calder | Sackler Wing |
| 15 November 1991 to 9 February 1992 | Hokusai | Sackler Wing |
| 19 September 1991 to 27 October 1991 | Francesco Clemente: Three worlds | Sackler Wing |
| 13 September 1991 to 15 December 1991 | The pop art show | Main galleries |
| 18 June 1991 to 1 September 1991 | The Fauve landscape: Matisse, Derain, Braque and their circle | Sackler Wing |
| 18 June 1991 to 1992 | The Royal Academy 1768–1830 | Private rooms |
| 8 March 1991 to 12 May 1991 | Sir Christopher Wren and the making of St Pauls | Private rooms |
| 1 February 1991 to 9 April 1991 | The passionate eye: impressionist and other paintings | Main galleries |
| 15 December 1990 to 20 January 1991 | Sheila Fell RA (1931–1979) | Main galleries |
| 23 November 1990 to 17 February 1991 | Egon Schiele and his contemporaries | Main galleries |
| 7 September 1990 to 9 December 1990 | Monet in the 90s: The series paintings | Main galleries |
| 28 July 1990 to 21 October 1990 | The Edwardians and after: the Royal Academy 1900–1950 | Private rooms |
| 21 April 1990 to 15 July 1990 | Modern masters from the Gelman collection | Private rooms |
| 13 January 1990 to 8 April 1990 | Frans Hals | Main galleries |
| 15 December 1989 to 25 February 1990 | Inigo Jones: complete architectural drawings | Private rooms |
| 22 September 1989 to 23 December 1989 | The art of photography | Main galleries |
| 14 September 1989 to 24 September 1989 | Michael Sandle RA | Diploma galleries |
| 9 September 1989 to 19 November 1989 | Gauguin and the School of Pont-Aven: Prints and paintings | Private rooms |
| 5 July 1989 to 3 September 1989 | Frederick Gore RA | Diploma galleries |
| 17 May 1989 to 25 June 1989 | Conservation today | Private rooms |
| 17 March 1989 to 18 June 1989 | Royal Treasures of Sweden | Diploma galleries |
| 14 January 1989 to 9 April 1989 | Italian art in the 20th century | |
| 19 October 1988 to 20 November 1988 | Norman Adams RA | |
| 14 October 1988 to 4 January 1989 | Toulouse-Lautrec: the graphic works | |
| 16 September 1988 to 11 December 1988 | Henry Moore | |
| 7 September 1988 to 9 October 1988 | Jeffrey Camp RA | |
| 22 April 1988 to 21 August 1988 | Early Cézanne | Diploma galleries |
| 18 March 1988 to 12 June 1988 | Old Master paintings from the Thyssen-Bornemisza collection | Private rooms |
| 6 November 1987 to 6 March 1988 | Age of Chivalry: Art in Plantagenet England | |
| 16 September 1987 to 14 October 1987 | Reflections after Las Meninas | Diploma galleries |
| 10 July 1987 to 25 October 1987 | Master drawings from the Woodner collection | Private rooms |
| 6 June 1987 to 23 August 1987 | Jewels of the ancients: selections from the Gillian Sackler collection of near Eastern jewellery | |
| 27 March 1987 to 21 June 1987 | Byzantium to El Greco: Icons and frescoes from Greece | |
| 15 January 1987 to 5 April 1987 | British art in the twentieth century: the modern movement | |
| 3 October 1986 to 21 December 1986 | New architecture: Foster, Rogers, Stirling | |
| 16 September 1986 to 19 October 1986 | Michael Kenny: recent sculptures, reliefs and drawings | Diploma galleries |
| 11 September 1986 to 19 November 1986 | Je suis le cahier: the sketchbooks of Picasso | |
| 21 March 1986 to 22 June 1986 | Sir Alfred Gilbert | |
| 5 February 1986 to 23 March 1986 | Eduardo Paolozzi underground | |
| 16 January 1986 to 31 March 1986 | Sir Joshua Reynolds | |
| 11 October 1985 to 22 December 1985 | German art in the twentieth century | |
| 27 September 1985 to 3 November 1985 | Thirty London painters | |
| 20 April 1985 to 14 July 1985 | Edward Lear | |
| 22 February 1985 to 8 April 1985 | Peter Greenham | |
| 8 February 1985 to 24 March 1985 | Elisabeth Frink | |
| 11 January 1985 to 31 March 1985 | Chagall | Main galleries |
| 12 October 1984 to 19 December 1984 | Modern masters from the Thyssen-Bornemisza collection | |
| 7 September 1984 to 18 November 1984 | The age of Vermeer and de Hooch | |
| 24 March 1984 to 27 May 1984 | The Orientalists: Delacroix to Matisse | |
| 25 November 1983 to 11 March 1984 | The genius of Venice | |
| 6 October 1983 to 23 October 1983 | 53–83 ILEA exhibition: 3 decades of artists | Diploma galleries |
| 17 September 1983 to 13 November 1983 | Art of the avant-garde in Russia: the George Costakis collection | |
| 16 April 1983 to 10 July 1983 | The Hague school: Dutch masters of the 19th century | |
| 17 January 1983 to 27 March 1983 | Bartolomé Esteban Murillo 1617–1682 | |
| 2 October 1982 to 12 December 1982 | Painting in Naples from Caravaggio to Giordano 1606–1705 | |
| 28 December 1981 to 21 February 1982 | The Great Japan exhibition: Art of the Edo period 1860–1868 (Part II) | Main galleries |
| 24 October 1981 to 20 December 1981 | The Great Japan exhibition: Art of the Edo period 1860–1868 (Part I) | Main galleries |
| 15 January 1981 to 18 March 1981 | A new spirit in painting | Main galleries |
| 20 September to 14 December 1980 | Stanley Spencer RA | |
| 17 November 1979 to 16 March 1980 | Post-impressionism | |
| 21 November 1978 to 18 March 1979 | The Gold of El Dorado | |
| 4 March 1978 to 21 May 1978 | Rowlandson drawings from the Paul Mellon collection | |
| 14 January 1978 to 19 March 1978 | Robert Motherwell: Paintings and Collages from 1941 to the Present | Main galleries |
| 26 November 1977 to 19 February 1978 | Leonardo da Vinci, anatomical drawings from the Royal Collection | |
| 6 October 1977 to 30 October 1977 | Works on paper : Contemporary Art Society's gifts to public galleries, 1952–1977 | Diploma galleries |
| 19 March 1977 to 10 July 1977 | This brilliant year : Queen Victoria's jubilee 1887 | |
| 5 March 1977 to 11 April 1977 | John Tunnard 1900–1971 | |
| 20 November 1976 to 27 February 1977 | Pompeii AD 79 | |
| 10 January 1976 to 14 March 1976 | The golden age of Spanish painting | |
| 18 October 1975 to 30 November 1975 | Landscape masterpieces from Soviet museums | |
| 9 February 1974 to 28 April 1974 | Impressionism: its masters, its precursors and its influence in Britain | Diploma galleries |
| 29 September 1973 to 23 January 1974 | The Genius of China: An Exhibition of Archaeological Finds of the People's Republic of China | |
| 24 February 1973 to 30 April 1973 | English drawings and watercolours 1550–1850 from the Mellon Collection | Diploma galleries |
| 4 March 1972 to 30 April 1972 | Victorian and Edwardian decorative art, the Handley-Read Collection | |
| 8 January 1972 to 5 March 1972 | British sculptors '72 | |
| 20 November 1971 to 12 December 1971 | The Slade, 1871–1971: a centenary exhibition | Diploma galleries |
| 25 September 1971 to 21 November 1971 | Ensor to Permeke: nine Flemish painters, 1880–1950: Brusselmans, De Smet, Ensor, Evenepoel, Permeke, Spilliaert, Tytgat, Van den Berghe, Wouters | |
| 30 August 1969 to 30 November 1969 | French paintings since 1900 : from private collections in France | |
| 14 December 1968 to 2 March 1969 | Royal Academy of Arts bicentenary exhibition, 1768–1968 | Main galleries & diploma galleries |
| 6 January 1968 to 3 March 1968 | France in the Eighteenth Century | |
| 6 January 1966 to 6 March 1966 | Pierre Bonnard, 1867–1947 | |
| 17 September 1965 to 13 November 1965 | Treasures from the Commonwealth | |
| 12 December 1964 to 28 February 1965 | Painting in England 1700–1850 from the collection of Mr & Mrs Paul Mellon | |
| 23 July 1964 to 6 September 1964 | Hittite Art & The Antiquities of Anatolia | Diploma galleries |
| 7 December 1963 to 1 March 1964 | Goya and his times | |
| 28 September 1963 to 27 October 1963 | Treasures of the Royal Academy : an exhibition of paintings, drawings, sculpture and other possessions earlier than about 1850 | |
| 19 March 1963 to 28 April 1963 | A Painter's Collection: An Exhibition of Paintings, Drawings and Sculpture from the Collection of Edward Le Bas, RA | Diploma galleries |
| 15 February 1963 to 17 March 1963 | Art USA now : the Johnson collection of contemporary American paintings | Main galleries |
| 20 October 1962 to 21 December 1962 | Sir William Russell Flint | Diploma galleries |
| 22 June 1962 to 12 August 1962 | 5,000 years of Egyptian art | Diploma galleries |
| 6 January 1962 to 7 March 1962 | Primitives to Picasso: An Exhibition from Municipal and University Collections in Great Britain | |
| 10 March 1961 to 14 May 1961 | Paintings and Drawings by Sir Edwin Landseer, R. A. 1803–1873 | Diploma galleries |
| 10 December 1960 to 26 February 1961 | The age of Charles II | Main galleries |
| 2 January 1960 to 6 March 1960 | Italian art and Britain | |
| 4 January 1958 to 9 March 1958 | The age of Louis XIV | |
| 24 November 1956 to 3 March 1957 | British portraits | |
| 3 December 1955 to 26 February 1956 | English taste in the eighteenth century from Baroque to neoclassic | |
| 29 October 1955 to 19 February 1956 | Portuguese art, 800–1800 | |
| 27 November 1954 to 27 February 1955 | European masters of the eighteenth century | |
| 5 December 1953 to 6 March 1954 | Flemish Art, 1300–1700 | |
| 13 August 1953 to 25 October 1953 | Drawings by old masters | |
| 22 November 1952 to 1 March 1953 | Dutch pictures 1450–1750 | |
| 8 8 December 1951 to 9 March 1952 | The first hundred years of the Royal Academy, 1769–1868 | |
| 9 9 December 1950 to 7 March 1951 | Works by Holbein and Other Masters of the 16th and 17th Centuries | |
| 30 September 1950 to 31 October 1950 | Exhibition of Paintings and Silver from Woburn Abbey: Lent by the Duke of Bedford | |
| 10 December 1949 to 5 March 1950 | Landscape in French art 1550–1900 | |
| 8 January 1949 to 6 March 1949 | The Chantrey Collection | |
| 29 November 1947 to 29 February 1948 | exhibition of art chiefly from the dominions of India and Pakistan | |
| 26 October 1946 to 16 March 1947 | Exhibition of the King's Pictures | |
| 15 February 1946 to 17 March 1946 | Greek art 3000 B.C. – A.D. 1945 | Main galleries |
