= Government Islamia Science College, Karachi =

College in Karachi, Pakistan

Government Islamia Science College
- Motto: رَبِّ زدْنيِ عِلْماً (Arabic)
- Motto in English: "O my Lord! Advance me in Knowledge"
- Type: Public college
- Established: August 1961; 65 years ago
- Founder: Abdul Rehman Quraishi
- Affiliations: Board of Intermediate Education Karachi; University of Karachi
- Students: 3,000+
- Location: Jigar Muradabadi Road, M. A. Jinnah Road, Karachi, Sindh, Pakistan
- Campus: Urban

Government Islamia Science College (Urdu: اسلامیہ سائنس کالج) is a public intermediate and undergraduate college located in Karachi, Sindh, Pakistan. The college offers programs in the sciences, law, commerce and the arts, and is affiliated with the Board of Intermediate Education Karachi and the University of Karachi. It forms part of the Islamia College complex, was situated opposite Dawood College of Engineering and Technology, which also houses Islamia Law College and Islamia Commerce and Arts College, now shifted toward North Karachi near Khurshid Begam Park Ground.

== History ==
The Islamia College complex, of which Government Islamia Science College is a constituent institution, was established by Abdul Rehman Muhammad Quraishi, and the college was inaugurated by President Ayub Khan in August 1961. Quraishi, known as Quaid-e-Taleem, founded seventeen schools and colleges that operated under his personal administration, and also introduced Karachi's Qureshi Night College. He died on 22 June 1989.

During the 1970s, the college became a focal point of student political activity, with confrontations between members of the Islami Jamiat-e-Talaba (IJT), the Peoples Students Federation (PSF) and the All Pakistan Muttahida Students Organisation (APMSO). In 2004, the official assignee of Karachi, Kadir Bukhsh Umrani, filed a rent recovery and eviction case against the college complex before the Rent Controller East Karachi, prompting protests by student groups, who blocked traffic outside the Karachi Press Club. On 29 October 2008, a student demonstration outside the college escalated into a clash between IJT activists and police; a female journalist was injured and six students were detained under sections 147 and 148 of the Pakistan Penal Code.

In 2017, a students' committee petitioned the President of Pakistan over the long-running litigation affecting the Islamia College complex, which had placed the academic future of more than 18,000 students at stake.

== Academics ==
The college offers intermediate-level programs in the Pre-Engineering and Pre-Medical groups, as well as undergraduate Bachelor of Science (B.Sc.) programs in subjects including mathematics, physics, chemistry, geology, statistics, microbiology, biochemistry, botany, and zoology. Intermediate students are examined by the Board of Intermediate Education Karachi, while undergraduate programs are conducted under the affiliation of the University of Karachi.

== Notable alumni ==
- Altaf Hussain, of the Muttahida Qaumi Movement
- Zaheer Abbas, cricketer
- Shahid Afridi, cricketer
- Asif Mujtaba, cricketer
- Munawwar-uz-Zaman, Olympian
- Tassaduq Sohail (1930–2017), painter and short story writer
- Azeem Hafeez, cricketer
