= Pakistan International School =

Ex-Pakistan national curriculum school

A Pakistan International School (Urdu: پاکستان بین الاقوامی مکتب) is a school based outside Pakistan which promotes the national curriculum. These schools fall under the jurisdiction of the Federal Board of Intermediate and Secondary Education and cater mainly to students who are not nationals of the host country, such as the children of the staff of international businesses, international organizations, embassies, missions, or missionary programs. For overseas Pakistani families, these schools allow continuity in education from Pakistan as most prefer to stay in the same curriculum, especially for older children. Pakistan international schools typically use curricula based on the Federal Board of Intermediate and Secondary Education and offer both Urdu language and English language classes. Some schools also offer International General Certificate of Secondary Education. The first Pakistan international school was opened in Isa Town, Bahrain in 1956 as the Pakistan Urdu School.

== List of schools ==
=== Africa ===
==== Egypt ====
- Pakistan International School (Cairo)

==== Libya ====
- Pakistan Embassy School (Tripoli)

=== Asia ===
==== Bahrain ====
- Pakistan Urdu School (Isa Town)
- Pakistan School (Isa Town)

==== China ====
- Pakistan Embassy College (Beijing)

==== Iran ====
- Pakistan International School (Tehran)

==== Kuwait ====
- International School of Pakistan (Khaitan)
- New Pakistan International School (Hawally)
- Pakistan School & College (Salmiya & Mangaf)
- Pakistan English Academy (Farwaniya)
- Pakistan Excell School (Hawally & Jaleeb)
- Pakistan English School (Jaleeb)
- Pakistan Embassy (Jabriya)

==== Oman ====
- Pakistan School Muscat
- Pakistan School Buraimi
- Pakistan School Mussanah
- Pakistan School Nizwa
- Pakistan School Seeb
- Pakistan School Sohar

==== Qatar ====
- Pakistan International School of Doha (Conventional Branch), Qatar.
- Pakistan International School of Doha (Cambridge Branch), Qatar

==== Saudi Arabia ====
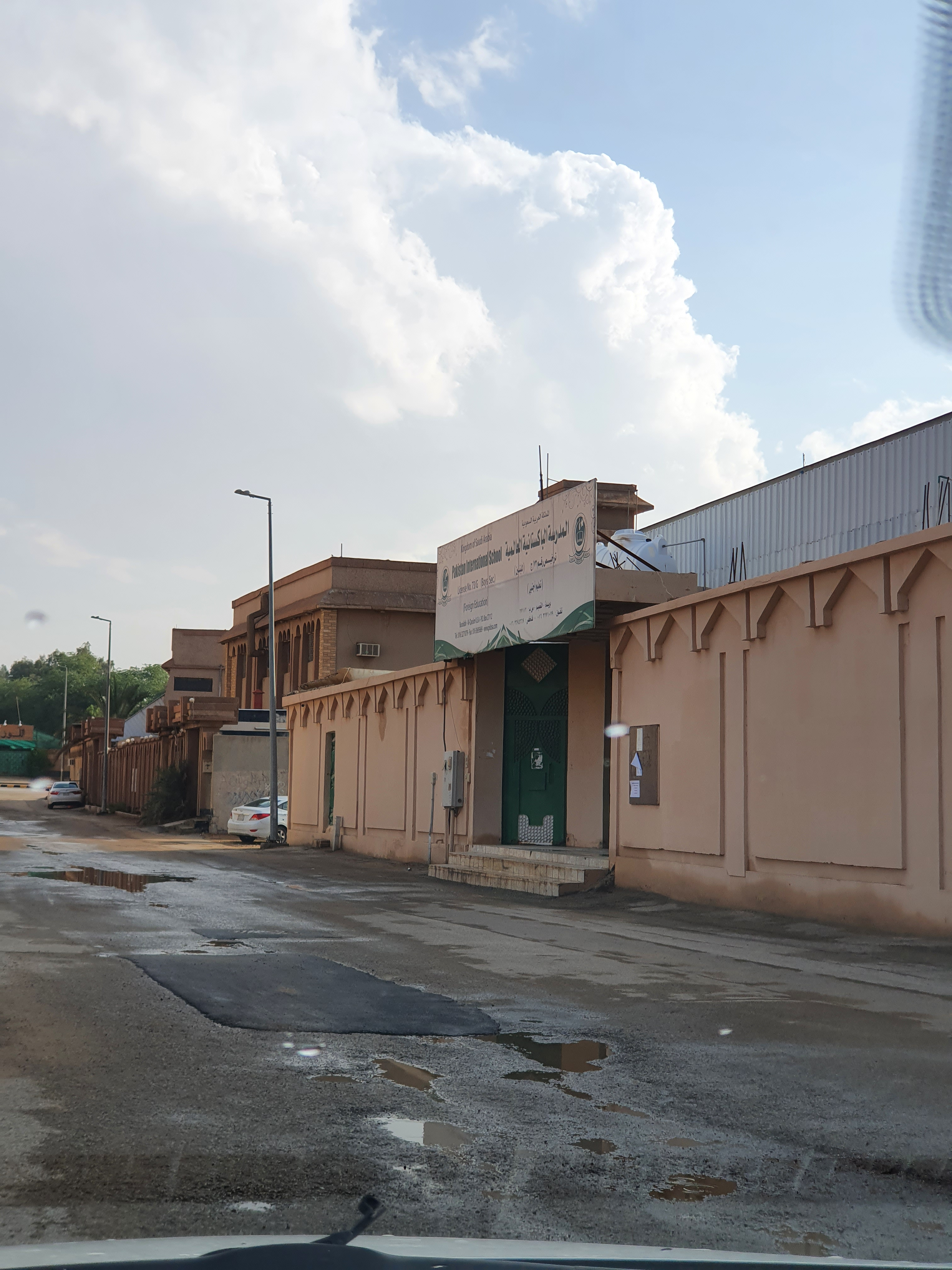
Pakistan International School Buraidah Al Qassim Saudi Arabia

- Pakistan International School Riyadh
- Pakistan International School Jeddah
- Pakistan International School Al-Khobar
- Pakistan International School Taif
- Pakistan International School Tabuk
- Pakistan International School Buraydah
- Pakistan International School Al-Jubail

==== Syria ====
- Pakistan International School (Yafour, Damascus)

==== Turkey ====
- Pakistan Embassy International Study Group (Ankara)

==== United Arab Emirates ====
- Pakistan Education Academy (Dubai)
- Pakistan Islamia Higher Secondary School (Sharjah)

==== Yemen ====
- Pakistan School (Sana'a)

== See also ==
- Overseas Pakistanis
- Education in Pakistan
