= Wafaq ul Madaris Al Salafiyyah =

Wafaq ul Madaris Al Salafiyyah is a federation of seminaries of Ahl-i Hadith faction in Pakistan. It was established in 1955 at Faisalabad.
