= Sarfraz Ahmed Naeemi =

Pakistani Islamic cleric (1948–2009)

- Born: 16 February 1948; Lahore, West Pakistan
- Died: 12 June 2009 (aged 61); Lahore, Pakistan

Philosophical work
- Era: Modern era
- Region: Lahore, East Pakistan
- School: Sunni: Hanafi Barelvi
- Notable ideas: Outspoken views against suicide bombings

Sarfraz Ahmed Naeemi Shaheed, (Urdu: سرفراز نعیمی), (16 February 1948 – 12 June 2009) was a Sunni Islamic cleric from Pakistan who was well known for his moderate and anti-terrorist views. He was killed in a suicide bombing in Jamia Naeemia Lahore, Lahore, Pakistan on 12 June 2009, after publicly denouncing the Tehrik-i-Taliban's terrorist actions and ideologies as unislamic.

== Life ==
Sarfraz Ahmed Naeemi, son of Muhammad Hussain Naeemi, was born on 16 February 1948. His ancestors had migrated to Pakistan from Moradabad in India. He was the senior cleric at the Jaamia Naeemia madrasah in Lahore, Pakistan. He became the principal of Jamia Naeemia in 1998 after the death of his father. The school is located in Garhi Shahu neighbourhood of Lahore. He got his early education from Jamia Naeemia and then did PhD from the Punjab University besides a short course from Al-Azhar University, in Egypt. Naeemi has been described as "a humble, moderate and widely respected scholar". He had a reputation of being one of the most progressive clerics in Pakistan. He knew Urdu, Arabic and Persian languages well and wrote columns in newspapers on religious issues and was the editor of monthly Arafat, Lahore. Naeemi, who had been known for his anti-Taliban stances, was earlier head of the Tanzeem-ul-Madaris Pakistan. The organization is tied to several universities in Pakistan and conducts its own exam according to its scheme and syllabus.

He has four daughters and one son, Raghib Hussain Naeemi, who succeeded him as principal of Jamia Naeemia after his death.

== Views ==
Naeemi was known for his outspoken views against suicide bombings and militancy, for openly supporting the ongoing operation by Pakistan army in Swat, and for labelling the activities of the Taliban "un-Islamic". In May 2009 he was quoted by Reuters as having said, "The military must eliminate the Taliban once and for all otherwise they will capture the entire country which would be a big catastrophe". Also in May 2009, he took part in a conference of Islamic scholars convened by the government which criticised suicide attacks and the beheading of innocent Muslims as un-Islamic. He advocated equal access to education for women and the use of computers in schools, ideas in contrast with Taliban's harsh interpretation of Islam.

Naeemi had also organised demonstrations against the Taliban as well organising an alliance of religious organisations to oppose the Taliban. Last month the Sunni Ittehad Council announced that they "strongly condemn the Taliban and urge the Pakistan military to eliminate them at the earliest", the council also said it would "unveil the real face of the Taliban before the public" by exposing their brutality. He had also passed a fatwā denouncing suicide bombings, as well as criticising Taliban leader Sufi Muhammad by saying he "should wear bangles if he is hiding like a woman". Naeemi had said "Those who commit suicide attacks for attaining paradise will go to hell, as they kill many innocent people". According to Khalid Zaheer, a Pakistani professor and religious scholar "His argument was simple: Religion does not stand for violence. You can't take the life of any individual, or your own life. And you can't wage jihad against your own state." Naeemi was the driving force behind the Tahaffuz-e-Namoos-e-Risalat Mahaz (TNRM), a group of over 20 Sunni parties raising voice against the violence committed by the Taliban. In January 2009 Tahaffuz-e-Namoos-e-Risalat Mahaz (TNRM) held a conference in Jamia Naeemia and issued a fatwa making Jihad obligatory for all Pakistani citizens in case of an attack by India. In addition it called on Pakistan government to stop cooperating with United States in the event of war with India. The clerics also called upon Pakistan government to "unveil the Indian conspiracies hatched against Pakistan before the world".

He was known for his stance on global Muslim issues like victimisation and suppression of Muslim movements and invasions on Muslim countries. He raised his voice against Pervez Musharraf's decision to provide logistic support to US-led coalition in the war on terror for which he was first removed from his job as Khateeb in the government-run Auqaf Department and then arrested briefly. Naeemi frequently argued that American, Israeli and Indian Intelligence Agencies were supporting the Taliban in order to destabilise Pakistan and seize control of its nuclear arsenal.

== Assassination ==
For making these statements, he had received death threats. He had refused police protection. On the day of his death he was greeting visitors in his office after Friday prayers when the suicide bomber managed to get inside and detonate himself at around 3 pm. According to witnesses the attacker was clean shaven, about 18–20 years old & appeared to be from southern part of Punjab province. Four others were also killed and 10 people were injured in the attack. According to provincial police chief Tariq Saleem Dogar, "Sarfraz Naeemi was seriously injured and shifted to hospital where he passed away". Tehrik-i-Taliban Pakistan claimed responsibility for the attack. He was buried the following day among anti-Taliban chants of his followers.

=== Aftermath ===
Shortly after the blast, hundreds of mourners gathered at the mosque and chanted "Death to Taliban". Widespread protests were noted in Lahore after the attacks. Security was increased around all major seminaries and mosques in the city. All Pakistan traders association announced a countrywide strike for the following day. Naeemi's son Raghib filed a complaint the following day with the police saying "Baitullah Mehsud is responsible for planning and motivating the attack that killed my father", and accused him of murder.

The following day a general strike was observed in Pakistan. Karachi the commercial capital of the country was virtually shut down. About 200 activists of Jamaat Ahle Sunnat, a moderate Muslim sect, staged a mock funeral procession for the Taliban. They chanted "Down with the Taliban, Taliban is the enemy of Islam, death for the killers of Sarfraz Naeemi." Mohammad Arif, 35, a former Naeemi student who now works as a prayer leader at the mosque said "We have no doubts that Taliban have killed our leader, Our demand to the government is that they should kill each and every Taliban. We demand that their chief Baitullah Mehsud should be arrested and hanged in public. This is the only option to save this country."

In neighboring India, Muslim groups also protested against the killing of Naeemi and the activities of the Pakistani Taliban. The head of the Muslim Students Organization of India, Shahnawaz Warsi, said "We came together to protest the ongoing killings of Sunni scholars by the Wahhabi Talibani terrorists in Pakistan". "We support the Pakistani government in its war against these terrorists. Terrorists are nothing but enemy of Islam and have presented their distorted version of Islam," a leader of the protests said.

=== Reaction ===
The killing of Sarfraz Naeemi was strongly condemned by Prime Minister Yousaf Raza Gillani. Imran Khan chairman of Pakistan Tehreek-e-Insaf party also condemned the killing. The French foreign minister Bernard Kouchner condemned the killing calling Naeemi "a well-known Sunni cleric who was respected for his moderate views on Islam". In a late night broadcast to the nation President Asif Ali Zardari singled out the killing of Naeemi and condemned it calling Taliban brutal and out to destroy Pakistan. On 14 June United States drones struck the stronghold of Baitullah Mehsud in apparent retaliation for this and other recent attacks. The Pakistani military also launched air strikes against Taliban in response to this and other recent attacks. On 15 June Prime Minister Yousaf Raza Gilani announced the highest civil award for Naeemi, the National Assembly of Pakistan also passed a resolution condemning the killing and applauding Naeemi's works.

== Awards and recognition ==
- Sitara-i-Shujaat (Star of Bravery) by the President of Pakistan in 2018.
