= Board of Intermediate and Secondary Education, Bahawalpur =

Education board in Punjab, Pakistan

- هیئت تعلیم متوسط و ثانوی ، بہاولپور; BISE Bahawalpur
- Logo of Board of Intermediate and Secondary Education, Bahawalpur

Education Board overview
- Formed: February 3, 1998
- Type: Government
- Jurisdiction: Includes districts: Bahawalpur District; Bahawalnagar District Rahim Yar Khan District
- Headquarters: Bahawalpur
- Education Board executives: Prof. Dr. Mukhtar Ali, Chairman of the board; Prof. Nadir Chattha, Secretary
- Website: bisebwp.edu.pk

The Board of Intermediate and Secondary Education, Bahawalpur is a board of Punjab located in Bahawalpur.

== Jurisdiction ==
Jurisdiction of the Bahawalpur board includes the following districts:

- Bahawalpur District
- Bahawalnagar District
- Rahim Yar Khan District

== See also ==
- List of educational boards in Pakistan
- Federal Board of Intermediate and Secondary Education
