= Board of Intermediate and Secondary Education, Dera Ghazi Khan =

Education board in Punjab, Pakistan

- هیئت تعلیم متوسط و ثانوی ، ڈیرہ غازی خان; BISE DG Khan
- Official Seal of the Board of Intermediate and Secondary Education, Dera Ghazi Khan

Education board overview
- Formed: 1989
- Jurisdiction: Includes Districts: Dera Ghazi Khan District; Muzaffargarh District; Layyah District; Rajanpur District
- Headquarters: Dera Ghazi Khan
- Education board executives: Prof. Dr. Abdul Rauf, Chairman; Rao Shahid Mehmood, Secretary
- Website: www.bisedgkhan.edu.pk

The Board of Intermediate and Secondary Education, Dera Ghazi Khan is a government body located in the Chowk Sarwar Wali. The Board was established in 1989.

== Jurisdiction ==
The jurisdiction of DG Khan Board includes the following districts:

- Muzaffargarh
- Layyah
- Rajanpur
- Kot Addu
- Tonsa

== See also ==
- List of educational boards in Pakistan
- Federal Board of Intermediate and Secondary Education
