= Jamia Naeemia Lahore =

Islamic University in Lahore

Darul Uloom Jamia Naeemia Lahore
- دارالعلوم جامعہ نعیمیہ
- Other name: Jamia Naeemia Lahore
- Established: 11 November 1980
- Founder: Mufti Muhammad Husain Naeemi
- Affiliations: Religious
- Principal: Dr. Raghib Hussain Naeemi
- Location: Allama Iqbal Road, Muhammad Nagar Garhi Shahu, Lahore, Punjab, Lahore, Punjab, Pakistan
- Website: www.jamianaeemia.com

Jamia Naeemia Lahore is an Islamic University in Lahore associated with the Sunni Barelvi movement. Founded by Mufti Muhammad Husain Naeemi, father of Sarfraz Ahmed Naeemi. It serves as the largest Sunni institution for the Barelvi movement in Pakistan.

The word "Naeemi" and "Naeemia" is taken from name of Naeem-ud-Deen Muradabadi, who was a close fellow and pupil of Ahmed Raza Khan. Dr. Raghib Hussain Naeemi is the present principal of the institution.

== Movement against terrorism ==
In May 2009, a declaration was made by the principal of this institute, Mufti Sarfraz Ahmed Naeemi, that, "The military must eliminate the Taliban once and for all otherwise they will capture the entire country which would be a big catastrophe." In May 2009, he also took part in a conference of Islamic scholars convened by the government which criticised suicide attacks and the be-heading of innocent Muslims as un-Islamic. He advocated equal access to education for women and the use of computers in schools, ideas in contrast with Taliban's harsh interpretation of Islam.

== Terrorist attack ==
This Institute was highlighted on the global media when it was targeted by a suicide bombing in which its principal, Sarfraz Ahmed Naeemi, was killed. According to New York Times the attack was in retaliation of a Fatwa (verdict) issued by the University against the Taliban.

== See also ==
- List of Islamic educational institutions
