= Andhra Pradesh Board of Secondary Education =

Education organization in Andhra Pradesh, India

Board of Secondary Education, Andhra Pradesh
- Abbreviation: BSE, A.P.
- Formation: 1969
- Type: State Governmental Board of School Education
- Headquarters: Vijayawada, India
- Location: Beside SPNRCH High School, Opposite Andhra Hospitals, Gollapudi Vijayawada
- Official language: Telugu & English
- Website: www.bse.ap.gov.in

The Board of Secondary Education, Andhra Pradesh abbreviated BSEAP also known as Directorate of Government Examinations, Andhra Pradesh. It was established in 1969 by G.O.Ms.No. 63, Education (W-2) Department, Dated: 16–01–1969. The Directorate of Government Examinations, A.P., is a Head of the Department (HOD) under the Administrative Control of the School Education Department, Government of Andhra Pradesh, and is responsible for conduct of various major and minor examinations.

The Board regulates and supervises the system of Secondary Education in the State of Andhra Pradesh. It executes and governs various activities that include conducting various major and minor examinations and providing direction, support and leadership for all secondary educational institutions under its jurisdiction.

== Andhra Pradesh Directorate of Government Examinations ==
DGE's office conducts SSC/OSSC/Vocational examinations twice in a year. One is the Main examination in the month of March/April and SSC Advanced Supplementary Examinations in the month of June/July.

== See also ==
- Andhra Pradesh Board of Intermediate Education
