= Telangana Board of Secondary Education =

Education department in Telangana, India

Directorate of Government Examinations, Hyderabad, Telangana. Popularly known as SSC Board (Secondary School Certificate)
- Formation: 10 May 2016 (9 years ago)
- Type: Board of Secondary Education, Telangana
- Headquarters: Hyderabad, Telangana, India
- Location: Chapel Road, Nampally, Hyderabad, Telangana
- Official language: Telugu, English and Urdu
- Website: www.bse.telangana.gov.in/Index.aspx

Directorate of Government Examinations is an independent department functioning under ministry of Secondary Education, Government of Telangana. The Department is responsible for conducting the SSC/OSSC Public Examinations and a number of minor examinations as given below.

The Board of Secondary Education, Telangana (BSET), Popularly known as S.S.C Board (Secondary School Certificate) It also known as Telangana Board of Secondary Education, is a Board of education in Telangana, India. It was established on 10 May 2016. It is located at Nampally, Hyderabad.

== Major Examinations ==
DGE's office conducts SSC/OSSC examinations twice in a year. This is the major examination

The board regulates and supervises the system of functioning for the development of education of Secondary Examination for public and private schools under the state Government of Telangana. The board controls and maintains all the necessary secondary education in the state of Telangana. Under this board, various courses are offered to students for different occupations and to prepare the students for university.

=== Affiliations ===
The board affiliates all state schools, private schools and colleges in the state of Telangana. It also established and manages the Secondary Board High School.

=== Examinations ===
The board conducts final examinations every spring for the Higher Secondary Examination, High School Certificate Examinations and examinations of other courses prescribed by the board for Class 10.

=== See also ===
- Telangana Board of Intermediate Education
- List of schools in Hyderabad, Telangana
