= Federal Board of Intermediate and Secondary Education =

Federal education board of Pakistan

- Seal of the Federal Board of Intermediate and Secondary Education

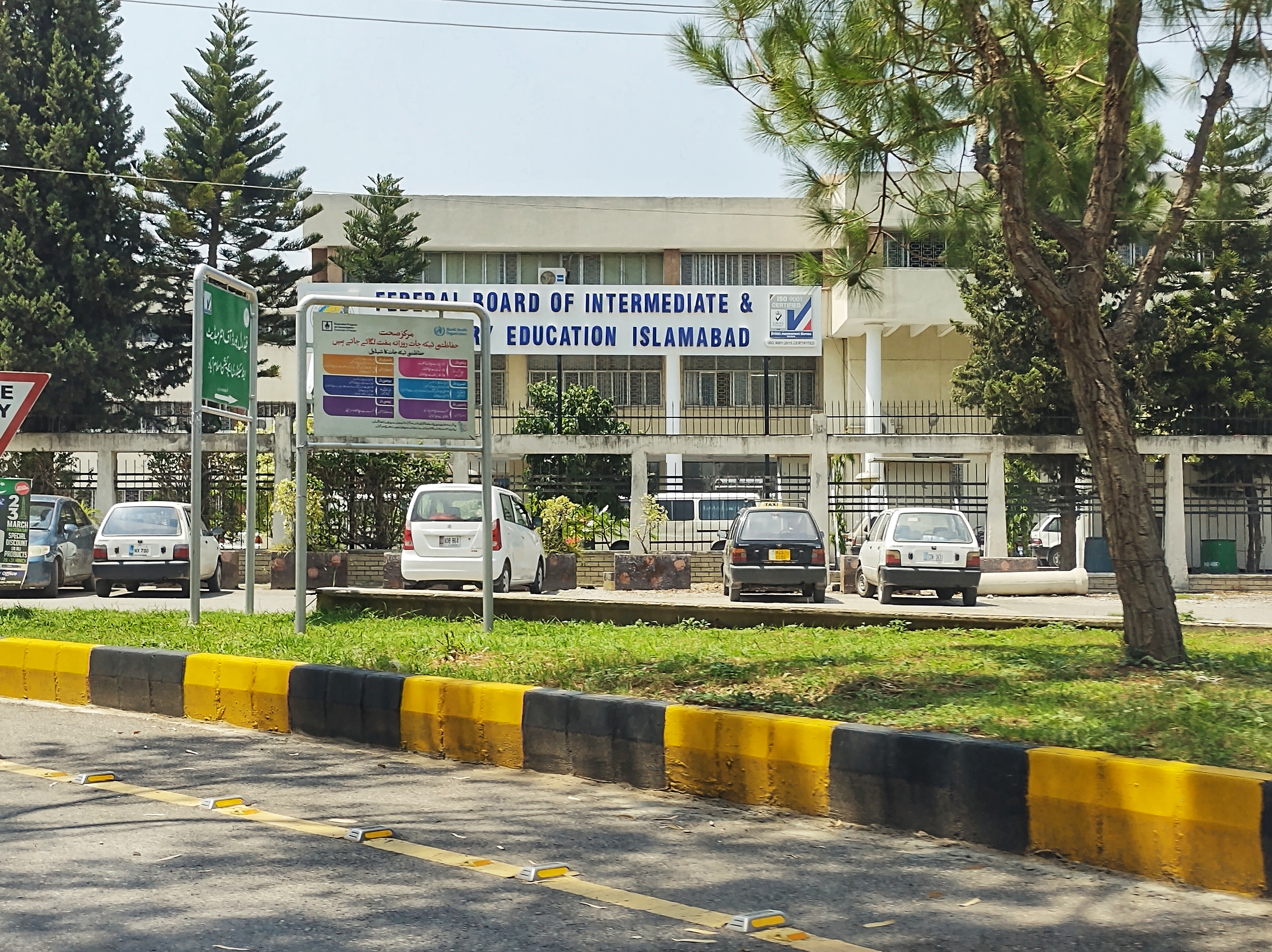
- Headquarters of the Federal Board of Intermediate and Secondary Education
- Abbreviation: FBISE
- Formation: 1975 (51 years ago)
- Type: Board of Education
- Legal status: Active
- Purpose: Regulation of Secondary and Higher Secondary education in federal-based institutions
- Headquarters: H-8/4, Islamabad
- Region served: Islamabad Capital Territory; Cantonments and Garrisons; Gilgit-Baltistan; Pakistan International School (abroad)
- Official language: English
- Chairperson: Dr. Ikram Ali Malik
- Secretary: Arshad Mehmood
- Board of directors: Mirza Ali (Test Development); Hamid Ullah (Public Grievances); Syed Hashim Munir (Affiliation, Monitoring & Quality Control); Sajid Ali Abbasi (Procurement & Services)
- Parent organisation: Ministry of Federal Education
- Website: fbise.edu.pk

The Federal Board of Intermediate and Secondary Education, (Note: Urdu: وفاقی ہیئت برائے متوسط و ثانوی تعلیم) commonly abbreviated as FBISE, is an autonomous board of education, under the Ministry of Federal Education, which regulates secondary and higher secondary education in federal-based institutions in Pakistan and abroad in Pakistan International School.

It is authorized with financial and administrative authority to organize, manage, regulate, develop and control intermediate and secondary education in general and accomplish examinations in the institutions affiliated with it.

The institution is administered through a governing body composed of a chairman, members from Parliament, two vice-chancellors, representatives from provincial governments, representative from directorate of military lands, and a representative from Ministry of Federal Education among others.

== History ==
The FBISE was established under the FBISE Act 1975. It is an autonomous body working under the Ministry of Federal Education and Professional Training. The official website of FBISE was launched on June 7, 2001, and was inaugurated by Mrs. Zobaida Jalal, the Minister for Education The first-ever online result of FBISE was announced on 18 August 2001. As of August 2004, 270 institutions were affiliated at the HSSC level and 545 at the SSC level.

== Jurisdiction ==
The Jurisdiction of the Federal Board of Intermediate and Secondary Education, Islamabad consists of the following:

- Islamabad
- Cantonments and Garrisons across Pakistan
- Gilgit Baltistan
- Pakistan International Schools outside Pakistan

== Activities ==
- Affiliate institutions imparting SSC and HSSC education within Pakistan and abroad
- Prescribe courses of instructions for SSC and HSSC
- Ensure provision of requisite facilities in the affiliated institutions
- Hold exams, appoint examiners and supervisory staff
- Institute measures to promote physical well-being of students
- Provision of scholarships to students at SSC and HSSC level
- Organising sports competitions at inter-school and inter-collegiate level

== Examination ==
The FBISE board held the following exams both across Pakistan and also abroad for overseas Pakistanis:

- Secondary School Certificate (SSC)

Secondary School Certificate is further divided into Secondary School Certificate Part-I (SSC-I) and Secondary School Certificate Part-II (SSC-II). SSC-I and SSC-II are often associated with Grade 9 and Grade 10th students.

- Higher Secondary School Certificate (HSSC)

Higher Secondary School Certificate is further divided into Higher Secondary School Certificate Part-I (HSSC-I) and Higher Secondary School Certificate Part-II (HSSC-II). HSSC-I and HSSC-II are typically associated with Grade 11 and Grade 12th students.

- Technical Education

On 6 July 2022 in its 115th BoG Meeting FBISE approved the Technical Education initiative, while on 30 August 2022, the FBISE introduced admission in technical courses at the SSC, HSSC and Diploma of Associate Engineering (DAE) levels.

== Examination methodology ==
In 2022, FBISE Changed its examination system from textbook based to conceptual learning or SLOs based. The student can learn the specified topic from anywhere (including internet). The student is not restricted to a particular/specified book or source. He or she can learn the topic from anywhere. Memorizing system was discontinued and from 2022 and onwards examination system were based on SLOs. FBISE conducted the first SLOs based examinations in 2022. SLOs based model question papers along with their solutions were also uploaded on the official FBISE website before examination. As FBISE Changed the examination system between the academic year, students also protested against this. However, SLO based examination system decision was not taken back by FBISE.

== See also ==
- List of educational boards in Pakistan
