= Board of Intermediate and Secondary Education, Gujranwala =

Education board in Punjab, Pakistan

- هیئت تعلیم متوسط و ثانوی ، گوجرانوالہ

Education board overview
- Formed: 1982
- Headquarters: Gujranwala; 32.2022°N 74.1880°E
- Education board executive: Prof. Nadeem Qaiser
- Website: bisegrw.com

The Board of Intermediate and Secondary Education, Gujranwala (colloquially known as BISE Gujranwala) is an examination board for secondary and intermediate education in Gujranwala Division.

== Jurisdiction ==
The jurisdiction of the board includes the following districts:

- Gujranwala District
- Gujrat District
- Mandi Bahauddin District
- Hafizabad District
- Narowal District
- Sialkot District
- Wazirabad District

== See also ==
- List of educational boards in Pakistan
