= Board of Intermediate and Secondary Education, Rawalpindi =

Education board in Punjab, Pakistan

Board of Intermediate and Secondary Education, Rawalpindi هیئت تعلیم متوسط و ثانوی، راولپنڈی

Gy overview
- Formed: October 1977
- Headquarters: Rawalpindi-46602
- Minister responsible: Rana Sikandar Hayat
- Website: www.biserawalpindi.edu.pk

The Board of Intermediate and Secondary Education, Rawalpindi is a government examination board responsible for conducting Secondary School Certificate (SSC) and Higher Secondary School Certificate (HSSC) examinations and announcing their results. The board operates as an autonomous body.

== History ==
The Board was established in October 1977. Its offices were previously located on 6th Road, Satellite Town, Rawalpindi but were shifted to a newly constructed campus in Morgah, near Attock Refinery, Rawalpindi, in March 2013.

== Jurisdiction ==
Jurisdiction of Rawalpindi Board includes Rawalpindi Division which includes following districts:

- Jhelum
- Attock
- Chakwal
- Murree
- Talagang

== Structure ==
- Chairman is the Chief Executive
- Secretary is the sector head of Academics, Finance, Public Relations, Library, Stores, Legal Cell, Meeting, Physical Education, Transport, Facilitation Center and Establishment Branches
- Controller of Examinations is the sector head of Matric, Inter, Secrecy, Discipline, Information Technology and Record Branches
- Audit Officer as an independent branch

== Board of Governors ==
The Board of Governors is composed of:

- The Chairman
- The Vice Chancellor of the university or his nominee
- The Director of Education (Colleges) Rawalpindi
- Executive District Officers of Attock, Chakwal, Jhelum, and Rawalpindi
- Representative from Finance and Education Departments
- Two Headmasters and one Headmistress of schools
- One Principal in each of the Degree and Intermediate colleges
- Two persons from amongst scholars and retired educationists

== See also ==
- List of boards of intermediate and secondary education in Pakistan
