= Board of Secondary Education, Karachi =

Education board in Karachi, Pakistan

- هیئت تعلیم ثانوی ،کراچی
- Formation: 1950
- Type: Government of Sindh Secondary Education Board
- Headquarters: Block 5, Nazimabad, Karachi
- Location: Karachi
- Official language: Urdu, Sindhi and English
- Website: bsek.edu.pk

The Board of Secondary Education, Karachi is a government board in Karachi for secondary education examination. It was established in 1950 by the promulgation of the Central Legislative Act No. XVI of 1950. BSEK controls and organizes the secondary education examinations in Karachi.

== See also ==
- List of educational boards in Pakistan
- Board of Intermediate Education, Karachi
