= Board of Intermediate and Secondary Education, Lahore =

Education board in Lahore, Pakistan

Coordinates: 31°55′39.16″N 74°32′49.21″E

- ہیئتِ ثانوی و اعلیٰ ثانوی تعلیم، لاہور
- Logo of BISE Lahore

Board overview
- Formed: 1954; 72 years ago
- Jurisdiction: Lahore, Kasur, Sheikhupura and Nankana sahib
- Status: Active
- Headquarters: Lahore
- Motto: تَعَلَّمُوا الْعِلْمَ وَعَلِّمُوهُ النَّاسَ
- Board executives: Engr. Dr. Badar-ul-Islam, Chairman; Rizwan Nazir, Secretary; Toseef-ur-Rehman, Controller of Examinations
- Parent department: Higher Education Department
- Website: www.biselahore.com

The Board of Intermediate and Secondary Education, Lahore (colloquially known as BISE Lahore) is an examination board for secondary and intermediate education in Lahore Division.

== History ==
Since Pakistan emerged on the map of the world in 1947, the examinations of the matriculation and intermediate level were conducted under the aegis of University of the Punjab. However, through the promulgation of the Punjab University Act (Amendment) Ordinance 1954, the Board of Secondary Education, Punjab was established in the province which took from the said university control of examinations of secondary, intermediate and Pakistani and classical languages. The first-ever examination for these stages was conducted in the year 1955. Owing to tremendous increase in the candidature, two more Boards were established at Multan and Sargodha under West Pakistan Boards of Intermediate and Secondary Education (Multan & Sargodha) Ordinance No.XVII of 1968. As a result of further bifurcation, Boards were also established at Rawalpindi, Gujranwala and Sahiwal. The re-construction of the Board of Intermediate & Secondary Education, Lahore has been done through the Punjab Boards of Intermediate & Secondary Education Act 1976 (lately amended by Punjab Ordinance No.XLVII), and presently in the administrative setup of the province, Nine Boards are functioning at division level.

== Jurisdiction ==
At the time of its inception in 1954, the Board inherited vast territorial jurisdictions for conducting examinations in the provinces of Punjab, Balochistan, Azad Kashmir and Northern Areas (now Gilgit Baltistan). To accommodate overseas candidates, the Board also constituted examination centers at Kuwait and Nairobi (Kenya). Current jurisdiction of the Board has been confined to the districts of Lahore, Kasur, Sheikhupura and Nankana sahib (Lahore division).

== See also ==
- List of educational boards in Pakistan
