= Board of Intermediate Education, Karachi =

Education board in Karachi, Pakistan

- هیئت تعلیم متوسط ،کراچی
- Seal of the Education Board of Karachi.
- Abbreviation: BIEK
- Type: Board of Education
- Headquarters: Karachi
- Official languages: Urdu, Sindhi and English
- Chairman: Fakir Muhammad Lakho
- Parent organization: Ministry of Education, Government of Sindh
- Affiliations: 354 colleges (2023)
- Website: biek.edu.pk

The Board of Intermediate Education, Karachi (BIEK) is a government board in Karachi for intermediate education examination. It was established as a separate entity in 1974 through the "Sindh Boards of Intermediate and Secondary Education" amendment act No. 20 page 31 of the 1973 book of documentation. The current chairman of the board is Fakir Muhammad Lakho. The board has the power to organize, regulate, develop and control intermediate education. The Board of Secondary Education, Karachi has similar authority for secondary education.

== History ==
In recent years, the Board of Intermediate Education, Karachi, has improve the examination system, enhance transparency, and modernize administrative processes. Additionally, the board has integrated an online result system, allowing students to access their grades efficiently. In response to declining passing rates (as reported in 2024), the board has launched initiatives focused on curriculum improvement, teacher training programs, and student counselling services. BIEK has collaborated with various educational institutions and governmental organizations to enhance the quality of intermediate education in Karachi.

== See also ==
- List of educational boards in Pakistan
