= HH8 =

HH8 or HH-8 may refer to:

- Echoes of Honor, the eighth novel in the Honor Harrington series by David Weber, abbreviated HH8
- HH8, one of the Hamburger–Hamilton stages in chick development
- KiSS1-derived peptide receptor (HH8)

== See also ==
- H8 (disambiguation)
