= F-8, Islamabad =

F-8 ایف-۸
- Sector
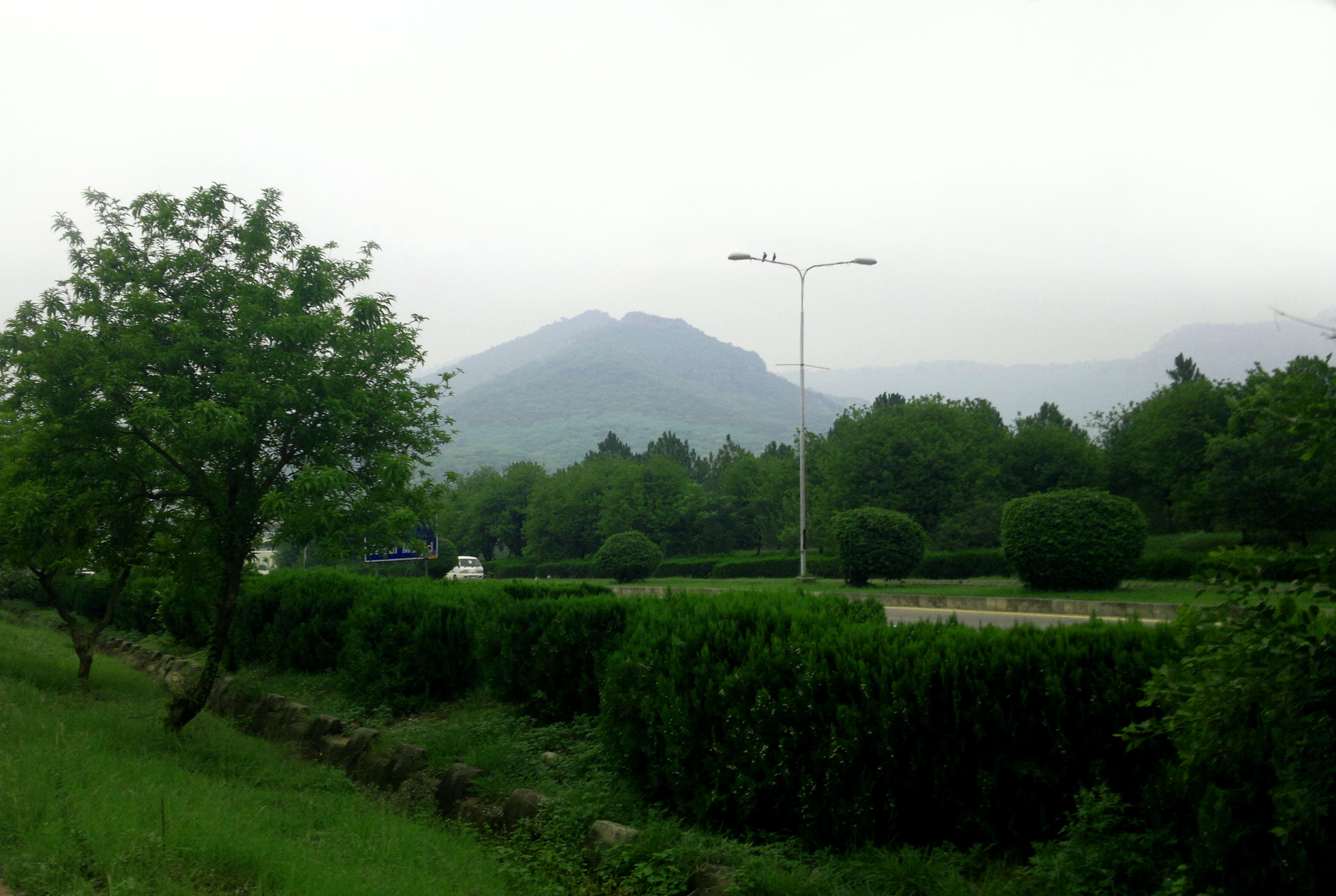
- F-8/3, F-8, Islamabad
- Interactive map of F-8
- Coordinates: 33.7115884°N 73.0396297°E
- Country: Pakistan
- Territory: Islamabad Capital Territory
- Zone: F
- Union Council: 28
- Founder: Ayub khan

Government
  - Body: Islamabad Metropolitan Corporation

Area
  - Total: 4.9 km^{2} (1.9 sq mi)

Population
  - Total: 40,000−60,000
- Postal Code: 44000

F-8 (Urdu: حلقہ ف ۸) is a sector of Islamabad. The sector is bounded by Margalla Avenue and E-8 to the north, Faisal Avenue and F-7 to the east, Jinnah Avenue and G-8 to the south, and Ninth Avenue and F-9 (Fatima Jinnah Park) to the west.

== Subdivisions ==
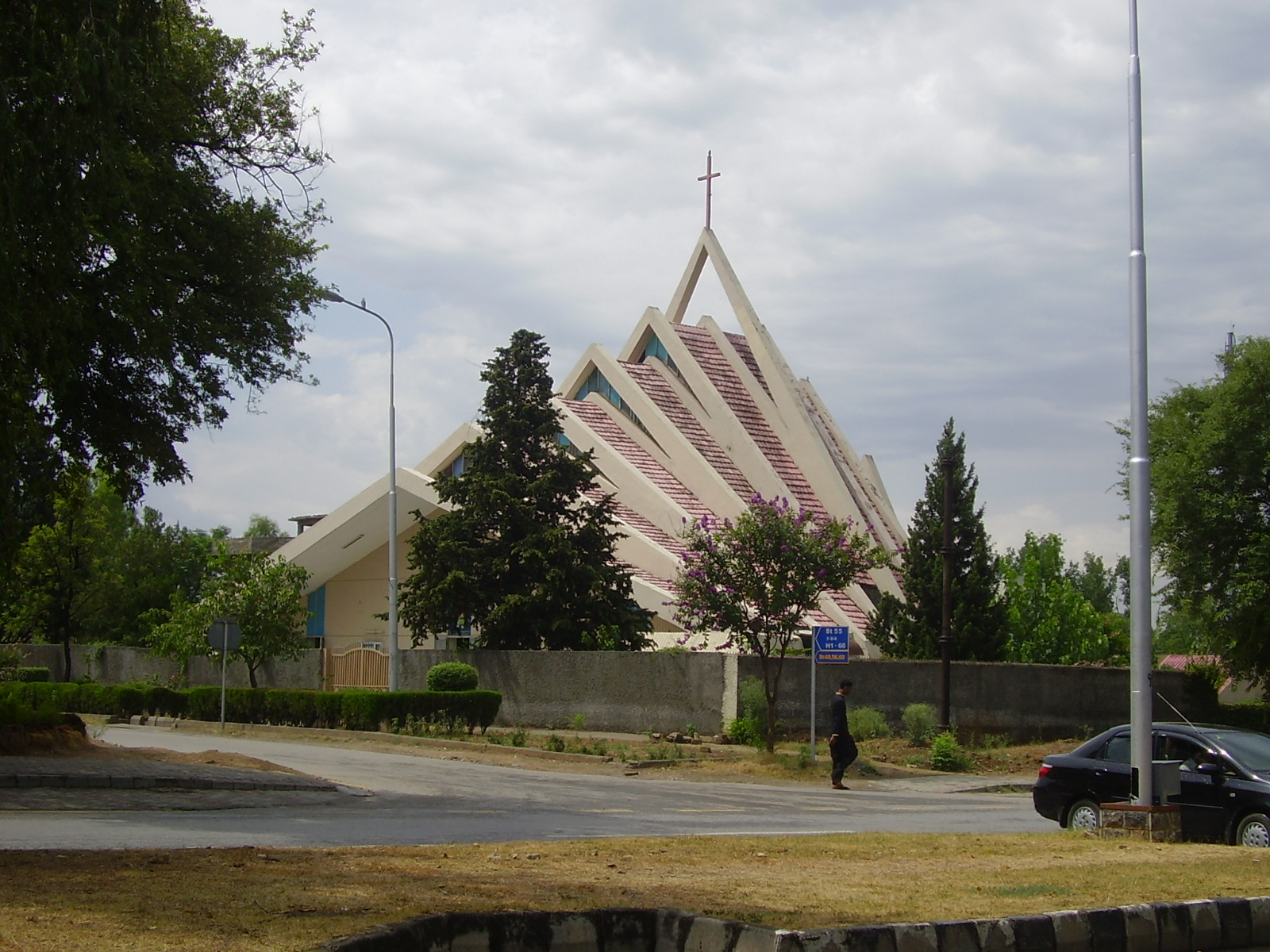
Our Lady of Fatima Church in Street 55, F-8/4

F-8 is further divided into 5 sub-sectors:

- F-8/1: Southwestern portion of F-8. Bounded by Park Road to the north, Johar Road to the east, Nazim-ud-Din Road to the south and Service Road to the west. Islamabad Model School for Girls and F-8/1 Children's Park is located here.
- F-8/2: Northwestern portion of F-8. Bounded by Margalla Road to the north, Kohistan Road to the east, Park Road to the south, and Service Road to the west. OPF Girls College and Madina Market are located here.
- F-8/3: Northeastern portion of F-8. Bounded by Margalla Road to the north, Ismail Zabeeh Road to the east, Kaghan Road to the south, and Kohistan Road to the west. F.G. Azaan Khan Shaheed Model School and Pakistan Muslim League (N) head office are located here.
- F-8/4: Southeastern portion of F-8. Bounded by Kaghan Road to the north, Ismail Zabeeh Road to the east, Nazim-ud-Din Road to the south, and Johar Road to the west. Our Lady of Fatima Church and IMCB are located here.
- F-8 Markaz: Forms the central commercial area, also known locally as Ayub Market. It also contains the District Courts Complex.
