= Timeline of the insurgency in Khyber Pakhtunkhwa (2007) =

Series of events in the Khyber Pakhtunkhwa 2007 insurgency

The 2007 timeline of the insurgency in Khyber Pakhtunkhwa:

== 28 April: Charsadda rally bombing ==
On 28 April, a suicide bomber killed 22 people at a political rally in Charsadda, North-West Frontier Province.

== 3–11 July: Lal Masjid siege ==
On 3 July, the Islamic fundamentalist militia affiliated with the Lal Masjid clashed with the Pakistani security forces outside the mosque in Islamabad. The Pakistani security forces immediately put up a siege around the mosque which lasted until 11 July and resulted in 109 deaths. This represented the main catalyst for the conflict and eventual breakdown of the truce that existed between Pakistan and the Taliban in the northwest. During the siege there were several attacks in Waziristan, Federally Administered Tribal Areas, in retaliation for the siege.

== 14–15 July: Attacks and end of truce ==
At least 75 Pakistanis, including soldiers and police recruits, were killed in three attacks on 14 and 15 July.

In a statement issued in Miranshah, the main town, the militants accused the government of breaking the agreement. "We are ending the agreement today," the Taliban Shura or Council said in pamphlets distributed in Miranshah, the capital of North Waziristan.

On 14 July 2007 a suicide bomber attacked a Pakistani Army convoy, killing 26 soldiers and wounding 54. On 15 July 2007, two suicide bombers attacked another Pakistani Army convoy killing 16 soldiers and 5 civilians and wounding another 47 people. In a separate incident, a fourth suicide bomber attacked a police headquarters, killing 28 police officers and recruits and wounding 35 people.

== 15–19 July: Waves of attack ==
From 15 July to 19, waves of attacks in Balochistan and NWFP killed over 200 people. On 17 July, a suicide bomber hit a rally featuring the country's suspended chief justice in Pakistan's capital Islamabad killing 15 people and wounding 44. Chief Justice Iftikhar Muhammad Chaudhry was travelling to the rally and was about three miles away when the attacker struck near the stage set up for him.

== 20 July: Car bombing in Karachi averted ==
On 20 July panic gripped evening shoppers at a Clifton shopping mall in Karachi, Sindh, when a bomb was defused immediately after it had been found in a car parked in a nearby parking area. An anonymous caller informed the Citizens-Police Liaison Committee that a bomb was planted in the car parked near the Park Towers. The shopping mall was the venue of a Harry Potter book launch and was packed with shoppers. Investigators said that the car carrying the bomb had been stolen from the Ferozabad police limits on 10 July and it had 4 kilograms of explosives. The bomb disposal squad (BDS) defused the bomb as the BDS officials severed the wiring connecting the boxes with the car's battery.

== 21 July - 2 September: Army moves into Waziristan ==
The Army moved large concentration of troops into Waziristan and had engaged in fierce clashes with militants in which at least 100 militants had been killed including wanted terrorist and former Guantanamo Bay detainee, Abdullah Mehsud. The militants also struck back in attacking Army convoys, security checkpoints and sending suicide bombers which has killed over 50 soldiers and police and over 100 civilians. In one month of fighting during the period from 24 July to 24 August 250 militants and 60 soldiers were killed. On 2 September, just a few militants managed to ambush a 17-vehicle army convoy and captured an estimated 240 soldiers in it, without a shot being fired; an event that shocked the nation. Seven officers were among the held. Following this, there has been widespread anger at the Pakistan Army within Pakistan.

== September: Army garrisons in Waziristan attacked ==
The army garrisoned the areas and set up checkpoints, but the militants hit hard - overrunning many checkpoints and kidnapping many soldiers in ambushes.

On 12 September, the first outpost was attacked and overrun by the Taliban, kidnapping 12 Pakistani soldiers.

The next day on 13 September, a suicide bomber in Ghazi Tarbela attacked a Pakistani army base, destroying the main mess hall and killing 20 members of the Karar commando group; Pakistan's most elite army unit. Another 29 soldiers were wounded.

A series of attacks ensued and by 20 September, a total of five Pakistani Army military outposts had been overrun and more than 25 soldiers captured.

== 21 December: Charsadda mosque bombing ==
On 21 December, a suicide bomber killed about 50 people and injured about 100 others in a mosque in Charsadda District, NWFP.

== List of attacks ==
Date	Location of attack	Mechanism of attack	Primary target	Number of killed & wounded
28 April	Charsadda, NWFP	Suicide bombing	Political rally	22 people killed
4 July		Suicide bombing	Army convoy	6 soldiers and 4 civilians are killed.
4 July	Peshawar, NWFP	Ambush	Police patrol	4 police officers are killed.
6 July	Chakdara, Swat District, NWFP	Suicide bombing	Army	4 soldiers are killed.
8 July	Charsadda, NWFP	Ambush	Chinese workers	3 Chinese workers are killed.
10 July	Kohat District, NWFP	Bomb attack	Police patrol	1 police officer is killed.
12 July	North Waziristan, FATA	Double suicide bombing	Police and army	4 police officers and 5 civilians are killed.
12 July	North Waziristan, FATA	Suicide bombing	Local administrator	2 civilians are killed.
13 July	Miranshah, North Waziristan, FATA	Ambush	Pro-government tribal chiefs	3 civilians are killed.
14 July	North Waziristan, FATA	Suicide bomber	Army convoy	26 soldiers are killed and 54 are wounded.
15 July	Mingora, Swat District, NWFP	Two suicide bombings and a roadside bomb	Military convoy	13 soldiers and 5 civilians are killed and 47 are wounded.
15 July	Dera Ismail Khan, Khyber Pakhtunkhwa	Suicide bombing	Police recruitment center	28 police officers and recruits are killed.
17 July	Islamabad, ICT	Suicide bombing	Chief Justice convention at the F-8 Markaz	17 civilians are killed and 40 wounded.
17 July 2007	Mirali, North Waziristan, FATA	Suicide bombing	Security checkpoint	3 soldiers and 1 civilian are killed and two wounded.
18 July 2007	North Waziristan, FATA	Ambush	Military convoy	17 soldiers and 12 militants are killed. Five additional militants killed in a separate incident.
19 July 2007	Hangu District, NWFP	Suicide bombing	Police academy	6 police officers and 1 civilian are killed.
19 July	Hub, Balochistan	Suicide bombing	Convoy of Chinese engineers	7 police officers and 23 civilians are killed and 30 are wounded.
19 July	Kohat, NWFP	Suicide bombing	Mosque in an army camp	18 killed and 19 wounded, mostly military personnel, 3 children among the dead.
22 July	North Waziristan, FATA	Ambush	Military convoy	11 soldiers Wounded and 19 Militants killed.
23 July	North Waziristan, FATA	Clash	Military checkposts	2 soldiers are killed and 7 are wounded and 35 Militants killed.
24 July	Bannu, NWFP	Rocket attack	Mosque and adjacent houses	14 civilians are killed and 33 are wounded. 7 Police officers are wounded.
25 July	Tunga, South Waziristan	Rocket attack	Security checkpost	1 soldier killed and 2 wounded.
27 July	Islamabad	Suicide bomber	Muzaffar Hotel near the Red mosque	14 people killed, including 8 policemen.
30 July	North Waziristan, FATA	Helicopter gunship attack & roadside bomb	Army convoy	3 soldiers are killed and 5 are wounded. 4 Militants are also killed.
31 July	North Waziristan, FATA	Helicopter gunship attack	Army checkpost	18 militants are killed by helicopter gunships.
2 August	Sargodha, Punjab	Attempted suicide bombing	Police training center	1 militant and 1 police officer killed.
3 August	Oblanki	Shootout	Army checkpost	4 soldiers and 10 militants killed.
3 August	Parachinar, FATA	Suicide car bomber	Bus station	12 civilians killed and 35 injured.
6 August 2007	Kohat Road, Peshawar, NWFP	Remote-controlled bomb	PAf Airbase	Two injured, Squadron Leader Mushtaq, driver Zain Khan and an unidentified child.
7 August	Degan, North Waziristan, NWFP	Helicopter gunship attack	Militant compound	At least 15 militants killed.
16 August	North Waziristan, NWFP	Ambush	Army convoy	At least 19 militants and 10 soldiers killed.
18 August	North Waziristan, NWFP	Rocket and gun attack	Army check post	2 soldiers killed.
18 August	Tank, North Waziristan, NWFP	Suicide car bomber	Army convoy	5 soldiers wounded.
19 August	Thal, North Waziristan, NWFP	Suicide car bomber	Army post	At least 3 soldiers killed.
19 August	North Waziristan, NWFP	Helicopter gunship attack	Militant compounds	At least 15 militants and 5 civilians killed.
22 August	Bannu, North Waziristan, NWFP	Gun and rocket attack	Army checkpoint	At least 4 soldiers and 3 militants killed.
24 August	Miran Shah, North Waziristan, NWFP	Suicide car bombing	Army convoy	5 soldiers killed.
24 August	North Waziristan, NWFP	Roadside bomb	Army convoy	1 soldier killed.
27 August	South Waziristan, NWFP	Beheading	Hostages	1 soldier killed.
2 September	Shawangi, North Waziristan, NWFP	Ambush	Army convoy	280 soldiers held.
3 September	Rawalpindi, Punjab	Two suicide bombings	Ministry of Defense bus and commercial market	19 soldiers and 12 civilians killed.
12 September		Clashes	Outpost (overrun)	12 soldiers held
13 September	South Waziristan, NWFP	Clashes	Militant hideouts	2 soldiers killed and 8 wounded. 50 militants killed
13 September	Ghazi Tarbela	Suicide bombing	Army mess hall	20 soldiers killed
14 September		Clashes	Outpost (overrun)	6 soldiers kidnapped.
16 September		Clashes	Outpost	2 soldiers killed and 5 wounded.
17 September		Clashes	Outpost (overrun)	16 soldiers and 18 militants killed.
18 September		Clashes	Outpost (overrun)	2 soldiers kidnapped.
19 September	Tall town	Clashes	Outpost (overrun)	7 soldiers kidnapped.
1 October	Bannu, NWFP	Suicide bombing	Military convoy	4 policemen and 11 civilians killed.
1 October	Bannu, NWFP	Clashes	Outpost (overrun)	33 soldiers kidnapped.
2 October	Bannu, NWFP	Rescue operation of kidnapped soldiers	Militant hideout	2 soldiers and 15 militants killed and 9 soldiers rescued.
4 October	Spin Wam	Clashes	Outpost (overrun)	28 soldiers kidnapped.
7 October	North Waziristan, FATA	Battle of Mir Ali	Militant bases, convoy	45 soldiers, 150 militants and 10 civilians killed and 13 soldiers missing.
6 December	Swat, NWFP	Re-capturing Swat	Militant bases	15 soldiers, 250 militants and 30 civilians killed.
12 December	North Waziristan, FATA	Ambush	Military convoy	6 soldiers and 15 militants killed.
21 December	Charsadda District, NWFP	Suicide bombing	Mosque	About 50 killed and 100 injured.
