= Mehrabadi =

Mehrabadi مہرآبادى
- Village
- Location in Islamabad Capital Territory Location in Pakistan
- Coordinates: 33.661899571941234°N 72.98509665226348°E
- Country: Pakistan
- Province: Islamabad Capital Territory

Area
  - Total: 8 km^{2} (3.1 sq mi)

Population (2015)
  - Total: 10,000
  - Density: 1,200/km^{2} (3,200/sq mi)
- Time zone: UTC+5 (PST)

Mehrabadi (Urdu: مہرآبادى) is an unplanned, informal neighborhood in Islamabad, the capital of Pakistan, located in G-12 and F-12 sectors. It has a mixed population that includes a substantial number of people from the country's Christian minority. It is located near sector G-11 of the city.

== See also ==
- Mira Jafar
