= Ashes of Victory =

2000 novel by David Weber

- First edition
- Author: David Weber
- Cover artist: David Mattingly
- Language: English
- Series: Honor Harrington Honorverse
- Genre: Military science fiction
- Publication date: 2000
- Publication place: United States
- Media type: Print (Paperback)
- Pages: 576
- ISBN: 0-671-57854-5
- OCLC: 42765100
- Dewey Decimal: 813/.54 21
- LC Class: PS3573.E217 A87 2000
- Preceded by: Echoes of Honor
- Followed by: War of Honor

Ashes of Victory is a science fiction novel by American writer David Weber. It is the ninth book in the Honor Harrington series.

== Plot summary ==
The book begins hours after the end of the previous novel. Honor Harrington and her "Elysian Space Navy" arrive at Manticoran-controlled space, only to discover that she was believed dead, that her mother had given birth to twins (partly to satisfy the Graysons' need for an heir to her Steading), her cousin Devon has inherited her Manticoran title, and that the extent of her injuries will prevent her from returning to active naval duty for a couple of years, since she needs reconstructive surgery.

To put Honor to good use, the Royal Manticoran Navy promotes her to Admiral (she having received a battlefield promotion to that rank on Hades) and places her at Saganami Island Naval Academy to teach future generations of naval officers. Queen Elizabeth III elevates Honor to Duchess Harrington. Meanwhile, Honor helps to prove that treecats are as intelligent as humans, and she eventually helps to develop an easy to understand sign language system, making full communication between humans and the treecats possible.

After the daring attacks featured in the previous novel, the People's Republic of Haven seems to have the initiative. However, Manticore has a trump card that has the potential to end the war, in the form of devastatingly effective new technology and weapons fully integrated into a new massive heavy assault force, known as 8th fleet. The Star Kingdom's navy bides time, waiting for the opportune moment to strike.

Chaos breaks out in the Havenite ranks, and the ambitious Admiral McQueen stages a coup that succeeds in killing Rob S. Pierre and almost all the members of the Havenite Committee of Public Safety, except for Oscar Saint-Just who manages to crush the coup by detonating a nuclear device secretly hidden within the navy headquarters. With the Committee and the military High Command in ruins, Saint-Just becomes the dictator of the People's Republic, and orders Admiral Thomas Theisman to take over the massive fleet guarding Haven. This proves to be an eventually fatal miscalculation. While Saint-Just believes Theisman is apolitical and trustworthy, in reality Theisman is plotting a coup of his own, with the secret help of the political commissar Saint-Just has assigned to him.

Admiral White Haven launches Manticore's Operation Buttercup. Under his command, 8th Fleet begins a lightning offensive deep into Havenite territory. The new technology developed by Manticore in the prelude to Buttercup allows the fleet to quickly demolish all Havenite resistance, and in a matter of months Manticore becomes poised to invade the Haven system itself. In desperation, Saint-Just attempts to assassinate the Manticoran Alliance leadership. Masadan terrorists in Saint-Just's service succeed in killing the Manticoran Prime Minister, The Duke of Cromarty, along with several major figures of the Manticoran and Grayson governments, despite the efforts of Honor Harrington. Honor's actions save Queen Elizabeth and the Protector of Grayson, Benjamin Mayhew IX, from dying in the same attack.

On Manticore, Cromarty's death opens an opportunity for former Opposition factions led by Baron High Ridge to seize political control, much to the frustration of Queen Elizabeth. Saint-Just proposes an immediate cease-fire between Manticore and Haven. This is hastily accepted by the new High Ridge government, despite the fact that 8th fleet is poised to invade Haven and force an unconditional surrender. High Ridge and his co-partisans in the military come to believe (wrongly) that Haven has been defeated for good, and that further violence is not necessary. The new Manticoran government institutes programs and policy that will begin a legacy of political greed, selfishness, incompetence, and cronyism that will have far reaching consequences for the entire Star Kingdom.

Now secure from the possibility of a Manticoran attack on the Haven System itself, Saint-Just turns to internal matters and the consolidation of his grip on power. He orders the arrest of Admirals Lester Tourville and Javier Giscard, whom he sees as political dissidents. Theisman launches his coup, the Havenite military wrests control of the government, and Theisman personally executes Saint-Just.

== Reviews ==
- Review by Carolyn Cushman (2000) in Locus, #470 March 2000
- Review by John C. Bunnell (2000) in Amazing Stories, Summer, 2000
- Review by David Mead (2001) in The New York Review of Science Fiction, February 2001

Preceded by Echoes of Honor	Honor Harrington books	Succeeded by War of Honor
