= H8 =

H8, H08 or H-8 may stand for:

- H-8 bomber, a 1970s Chinese military aircraft
- H8 Family, a 1990s large family of 8-bit and 16-bit microcontrollers made by Hitachi (Renesas Technology)
- H08 microcontroller from Hycon Technology
- H-8 (film), a 1958 Yugoslav movie
- H-8, a sector in Islamabad, Pakistan
- H8 Standing Way, a road in Milton Keynes grid road system
- British NVC community H8, a type of heath community in the British National Vegetation Classification
- Hagström H8, the world's first massproduced eight stringed bass guitar.
- Haval H8, a Chinese mid-size SUV
- Highway H08 (Ukraine), a road in Ukraine
- Heathkit H-8, a 1977 home computer kit
- HMS H8, a 1915 British Royal Navy H class submarine
- HMS Eclipse (H08), a 1934 E class destroyer of the Royal Navy
- PRR H8, an American 2-8-0 steam locomotives model
- C&O H-8 "Allegheny" steam locomotive, of the Whyte notation 2-6-6-6
- USS H-8 (SS-151), a 1918 United States Navy submarine
- H8, flat-eight engine

H8 may also represent:

- The airline code for Dalavia airline
- the internet slang for "hate"
- a robot villain in Magnus, Robot Fighter - the chief of police for North Am, he lived up to his name, as he really hated humans
- a supercomputer used by NASA
- Halloween 8, a horror film abbreviated to H8
- California Proposition 8 (2008)

== See also ==
- 8H (disambiguation)
