= I-10, Islamabad =

I-10 آئ-۱۰
- Sector
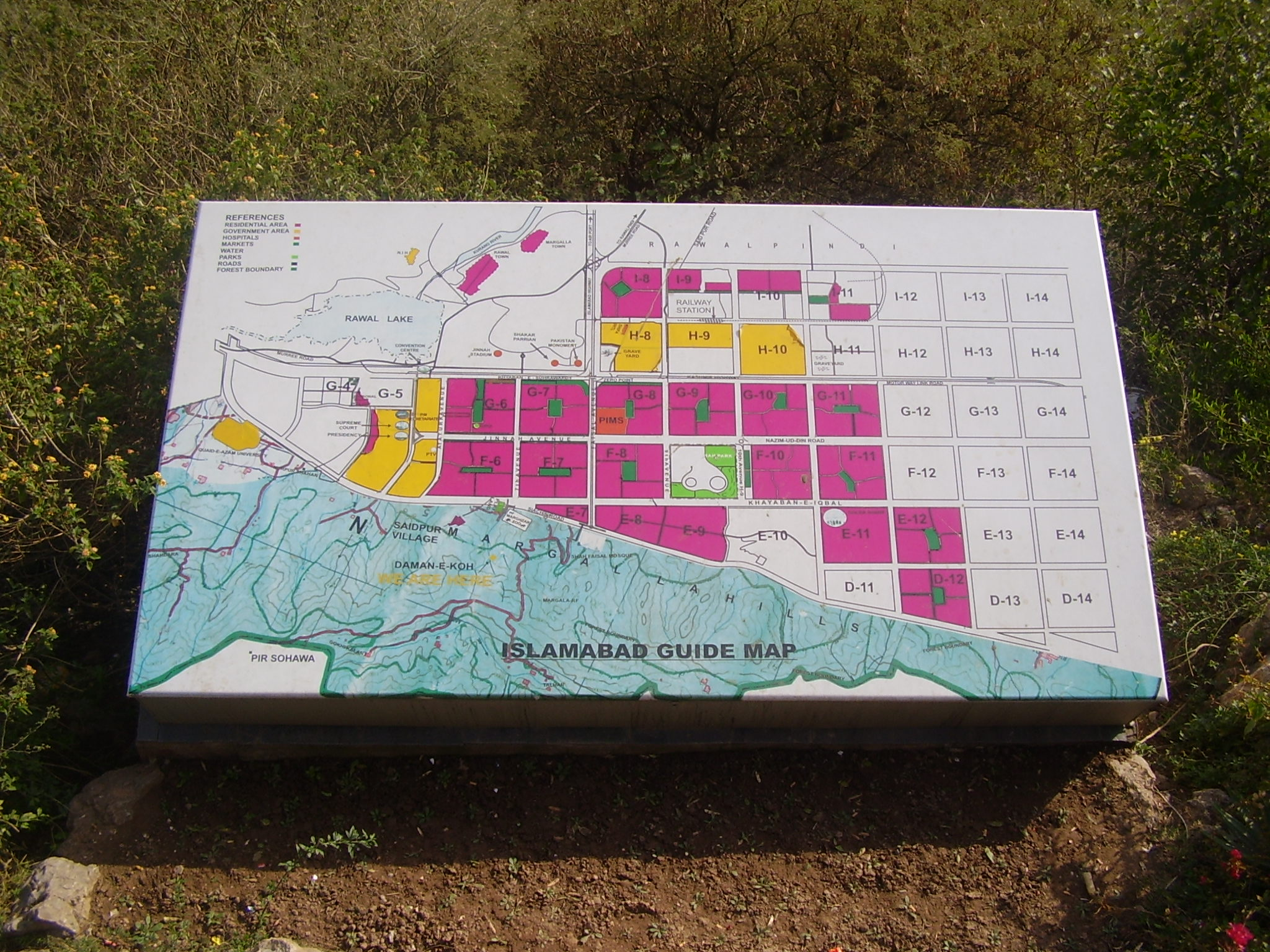
- Map of Islamabad, with I-10 visible at the top. Click to enlarge

- Location within Islamabad Capital Territory
- Coordinates: 33.64687325135239°N 73.03616470924985°E
- Country: Pakistan
- Territory: Islamabad Capital Territory
- City: Islamabad
- Time zone: UTC+5 (PST)

I-10 is a sector of Islamabad, Pakistan. It is a lightly built area, located on the southwestern edge of the city.

I-10 borders Rawalpindi to the south and neighbors I-9 and I-11, while sectors H-9, H-10, and H-11 are located adjacent. Like most other I-sectors, I-10 is primarily a part of the industrial zone. It consists of open land with dense vegetation. It is a densely populated area.
