= 8H =

8H or 8-H can refer to:

- GCR Class 8H, a class of 0-8-4T steam tank locomotives
- Studio 8H, NBC studio in the Comcast Building where Saturday Night Live is filmed
- 8H, a designation for the West Virginia-Western Maryland Synod
- SCELBI-8H, a hardware model sold with SCELBI
- Typ 8H, a model of Audi A4
- HJ-8H, a model of HJ-8 anti-tank missile
- IATA code for Highland Airways
- former IATA code for Harbour Air
- recalled IATA code for Equaflight Service

== See also ==
- H8 (disambiguation)
