= OPF Schools =

School system in Pakistan

OPF Schools is a school system established by the Overseas Pakistanis Foundation for the welfare of Overseas Pakistanis.

The Overseas Pakistanis Foundation operates more than 24 schools in across Pakistan, offering preschool, primary, secondary and preparation for local SSC and the international GCE education. Most of its students opt to take the GCE O and AS/A Levels organized by the CIE of UCLES.

In 2019, the school system started teaching Chinese language.

== List of schools ==
=== Islamabad Capital Territory ===
- OPF Girls College F-8, Islamabad
- OPF Boys College H 8/4 Islamabad
- OPF Girls College F-11, Islamabad

=== Khyber Pakhtunkhwa ===
- OPF Public School Hangu
- OPF Public School Mansehra
- OPF Public School D.I.Khan
- OPF Public School Peshawar

=== Balochistan ===
- OPF Public School Samngli Road Quetta
- OPF Public School Turbat

=== Punjab ===
- OPF Public School Kallar Syden
- OPF Public School Sheikhupura
- OPF Public School Bhalwal
- OPF Public School Sialkot
- OPF Public School Multan
- OPF Public School Depalpur
- OPF Girls HSS Rawalpindi
- OPF Public School Gujrat
- OPF Public School Pakpattan

=== Sindh ===
- OPF Public School Dadu
- OPF Public School Sanghar
- OPF Public School Larkana
- OPF Public School Badin
- OPF Public School Karachi

=== Azad Jammu and Kashmir ===
- OPF Public School Kotli
- OPF Public School Mirpur
- OPF Public School Muzaffarabad
