= Fatima Jinnah Park =

Public recreational park in Islamabad, Pakistan

- فاطمہ جناح پارک
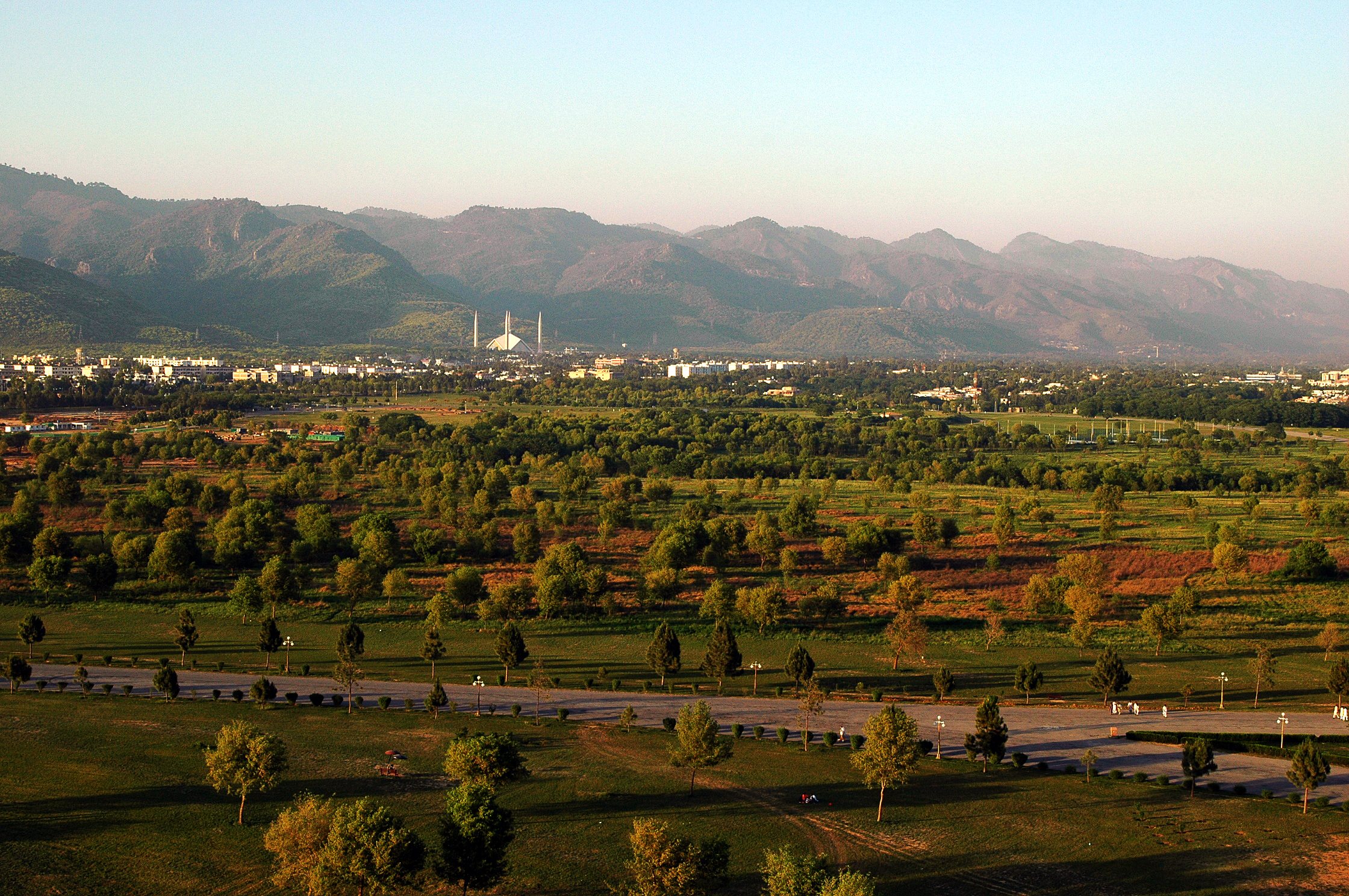
- Interactive map of Fatima Jinnah Park
- Type: Public
- Location: Islamabad, Pakistan
- Coordinates: 33°42′07″N 73°01′22″E
- Area: 304 hectares (750 acres)
- Opened: 1992; 34 years ago
- Designer: Michael Japero
- Etymology: From the name of Mādar-e Millat Fatima Jinnah, sister of Muhammad Ali Jinnah
- Administrator: Capital Development Authority
- Open: Year-round; 10:30 to 23:00
- Status: Operating
- Parking: Available

Fatima Jinnah Park (Urdu: فاطمہ جناح پارک), also known as Capital Park or F-9 Park, is a public recreational park that spans the whole of Sector F-9 of Islamabad, Pakistan. It is named after Mādar-e Millat Fatima Jinnah, the younger sister of the founder of Pakistan Muhammad Ali Jinnah. The park is administered by the Environment Wing of Capital Development Authority (CDA).

At 304 hectares (750 acres), it is just smaller than New York's Central Park. It was designed by Michael Japero, and was inaugurated in 1992. The park’s original master plan, prepared by the Japan International Cooperation Agency, was revised in 2005 by Pakistani architect Nayyar Ali Dada.

Fatima Jinnah Park's vast acreage is mostly covered by greenery, with a few man-made structures dotting the landscape. Most of the park area is effectively a wildlife sanctuary, except for a few areas of the park that are close to residential districts. The park is bounded by a steel fence with entrance doors placed at regular intervals, although only a few are routinely open and used. A further strip of land outside of the fence is lined with a footpath. A well laid network of footpaths lies inside the park, with neat grass and a few statues. Over 200 cameras have been installed in the park which are monitored by Islamabad Police to maintain safety of citizens in the park.

During 2024, over 5,000 small and large mulberry trees were removed from F-9 park and around 10,000 new trees were planted by CDA.

== Layout ==
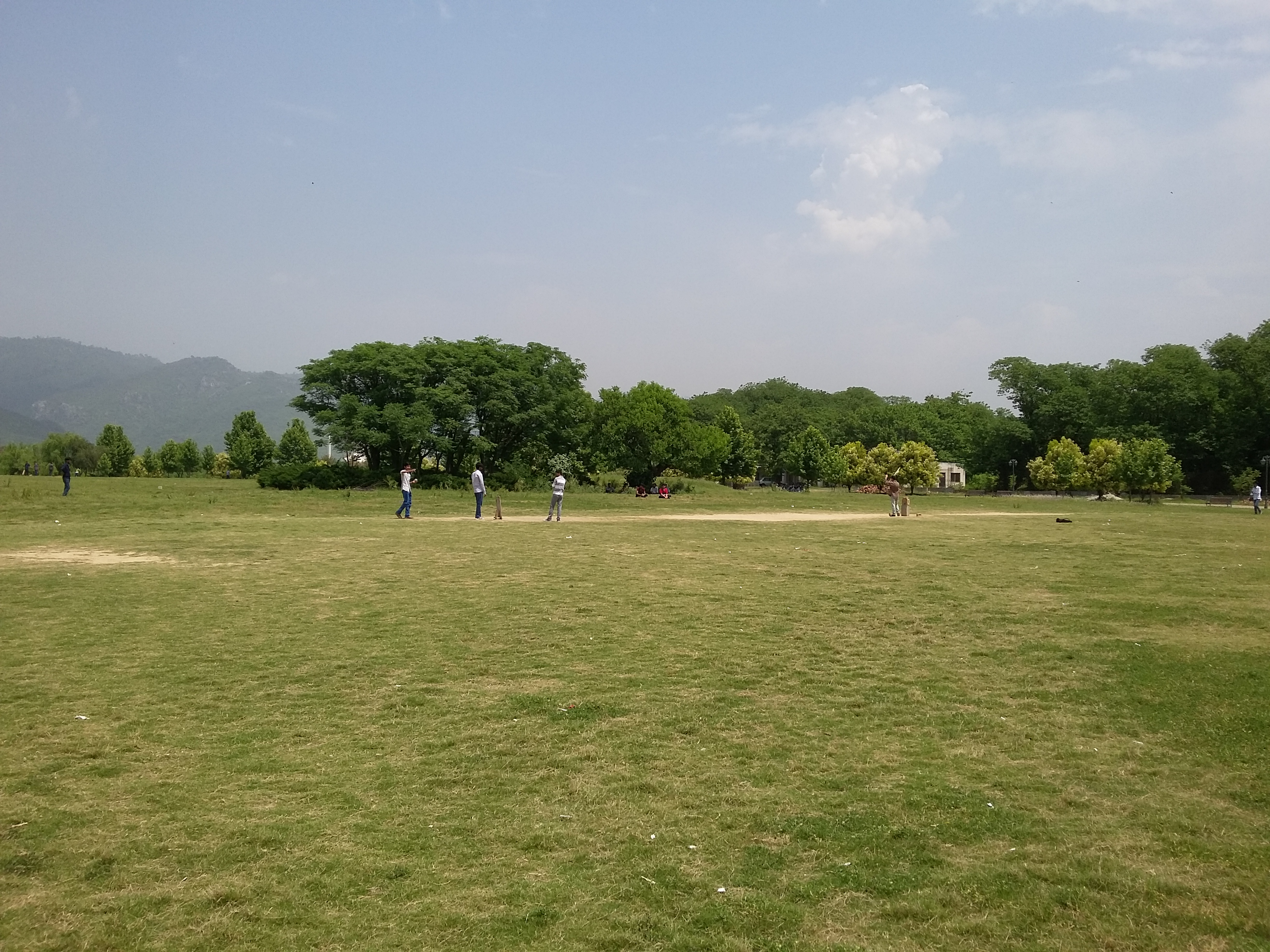
F-9 Fatima Jinnah Park Islamabad

Since the park is bounded by a steel fence on all four sides, entrance is possible only through the gates, at least one of which is present on each side.

- Gate 1: Mehran Gate, located on the southern side on Jinnah Avenue, facing sector G-9
- Gate 2: Bolan Gate, located on the western side, facing sector F-10
- Gate 3: Khyber Gate, located on the northern side, facing sector E-9
- Gate 4: Ravi Gate, located on the eastern side, facing sector F-8
- Gate 5: Located on the eastern side, leads to the Citizen Club Mass Vaccination Centre

A network of jogging tracks connects the abovementioned gates. Moreover, there is a mosque, parking lot, and public toilets at every entrance.

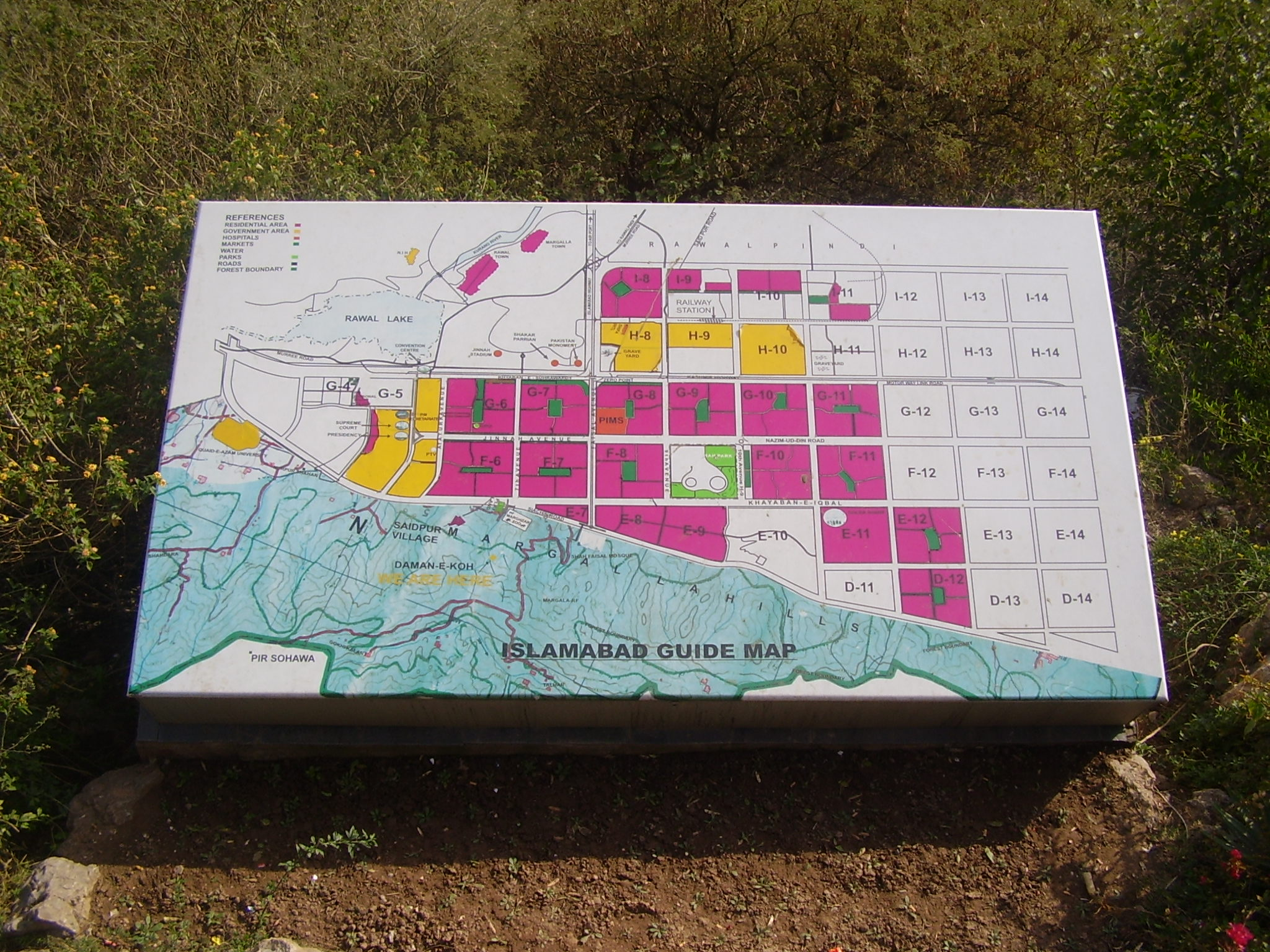
Guide map

== Public use ==
Only a few areas of Fatima Jinnah Park are man-made, containing busy clusters of buildings, while other areas rarely see human activity. The park's open spaces are commonly used for recreational walking and outdoor sports. Occasionally, they are used for driving lessons. The following man-made buildings are located inside the park:

=== Megazone Entertainment Hub ===
Owner / Founder of Megazone Entertainment Hub is Muhammad Khan. Mega Zone Entertainment Hub this complex was renovated and inaugurated as Megazone Entertainment Hub on 23 June 2023. It includes a sports zone with a standard-length swimming pool, a gym, sauna and steam.The complex also includes facilities for bowling, arcade games, VR Games, Motion Ride, softplay area and other games; areas for fast food.

=== Kapacious ===
Owner / Founder of Kapacious is Muhammad Khan. Premium indoor glass dining with Italian, Continental, Chinese cuisine & fast food experience. Huts and family seating experience.

=== The Salt Line ===
Owner / Founder of The Salt Line is Muhammad Khan. A modern desi restaurant offering traditional Pakistani flavors, BBQ, karahi, handi, and family dining experience.

=== McDonald's ===
The Supreme Court of Pakistan ordered a McDonald's fast-food restaurant and several clubs, such as an Aeromodeling Club, that had been operating inside F-9 Park to close down. However, these establishments are still operational as of 2023.

=== Gandhara Citizen Club ===
Formerly known as the Citizen Club, the facility is spread over 300-hectare (750-acre) with a 8.9-hectare (22-acre) covered area, has restaurants, an indoor pool, gym, lobby, aerobic area, and a fitness centre. Its construction was started by the Capital Development Authority (CDA) in 2008. The club is managed by board of governors as CDA established guidelines for functioning of the club.

== Solar power plant ==
In 2017, F-9 Park converted to solar energy with 3,400 solar panels installed on an area of around five acres inside the 300-hectare (750-acre) park at a cost of $4.8 million. Funds for the project were provided by the Chinese government as a grant. These panels generate about 0.85 megawatts (850 kW) of power and have a backup facility to provide energy to street lights. The system runs water pumps and sprinkler systems for the park, and provides power for the offices of the Metropolitan Corporation Islamabad and Capital Development Authority, both located within the park.

== Mass vaccination centre ==
In May 2021, a mass coronavirus vaccination centre was opened in the Citizen Club building inside the park. The facility has 75 counters, and can inoculate 7,000 people daily. Moreover, in June 2021, a drive-through vaccination centre was opened in the park in collaboration with Ministry of Health, Capital Development Authority, and the Bank of Punjab.

== 2025 SAAF Cross Country Championships ==
The 2025 South Asian Athletics Federation (SAAF) Cross Country Championships were held at Fatima Jinnah Park on 23 February, in which Pakistan, the host nation, clinched double gold in the senior 10 km and junior 8 km team events. The championship was supposed to take place in 2024, but was delayed due to adverse weather conditions at that time.

The event saw attendance from high-profile dignitaries, with ambassadors from Sri Lanka and Nepal, as well as senior diplomats from the Maldives and Sri Lanka. It was Pakistan's first time hosting the South Asian Cross Country Championship.

== Illegal logging ==
Over the past few years, the lack of repairs to the south-eastern side of the fence has enabled illegal cutting and transportation of trees.

== Future plans ==
The Capital Development Authority (CDA), which manages the park, has grand plans for the space, which is sometimes called the "sleeping heart" of Islamabad. The issue of the park's development is more pressing now that the people of Islamabad have taken a keen interest in recreational activities. The CDA's proposed future design for the park will include lakes, rock gardens, aquariums, and fountains. In a recent development, CDA has decided to establish a public library with international standards in the park.

== Gallery ==
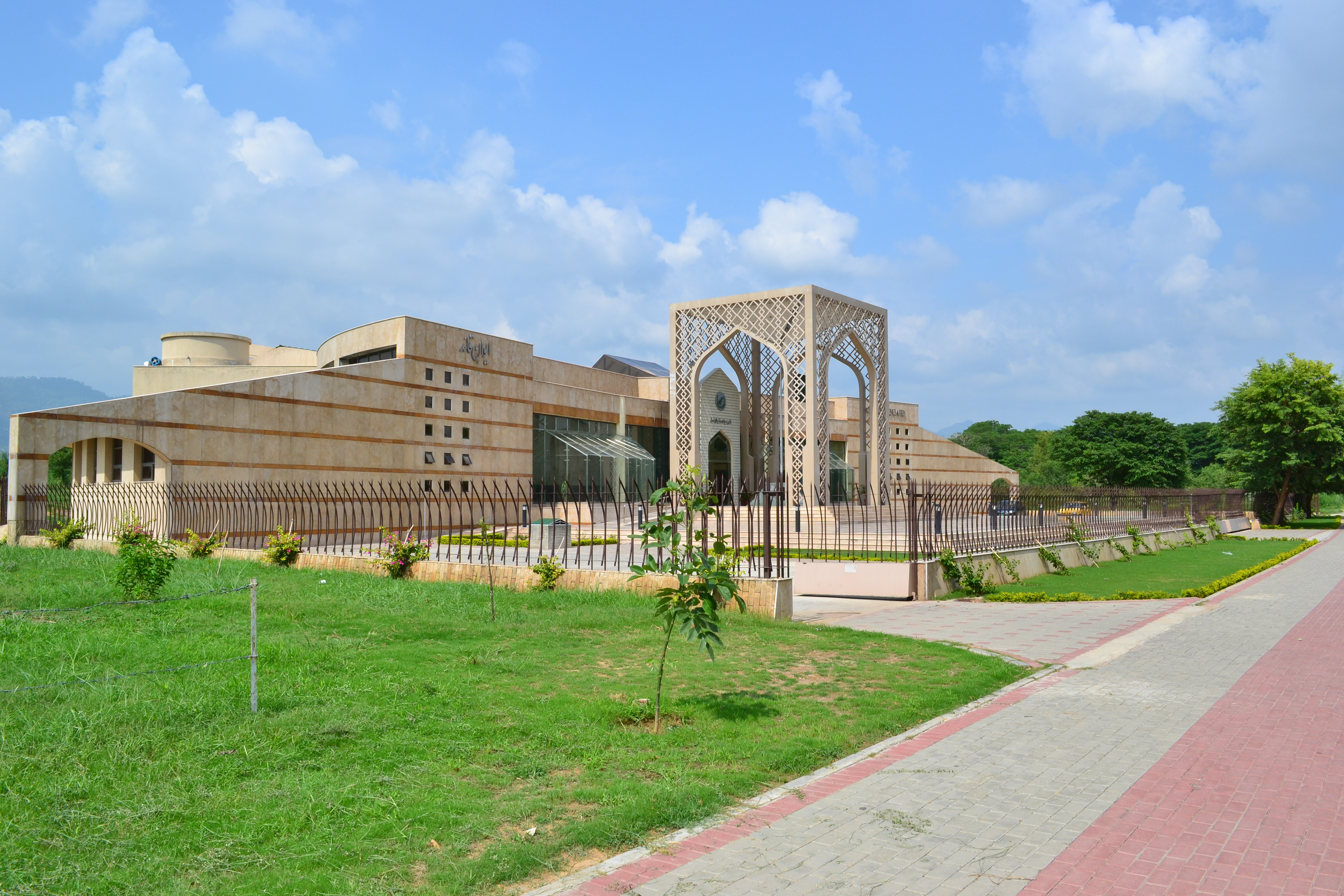
Aiwan-e-Quaid

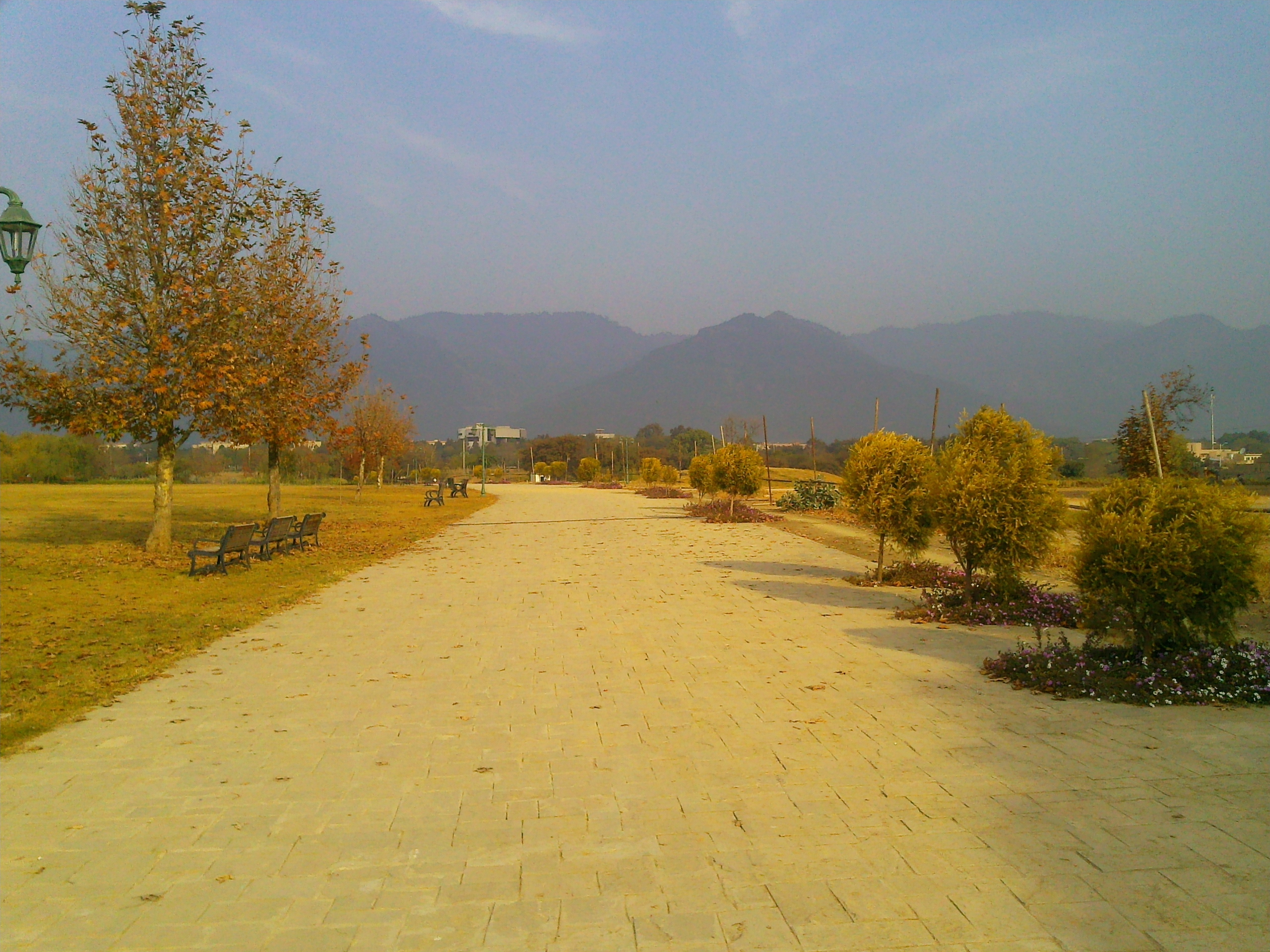
A walking track in the Park, with the Margalla Hills in the background

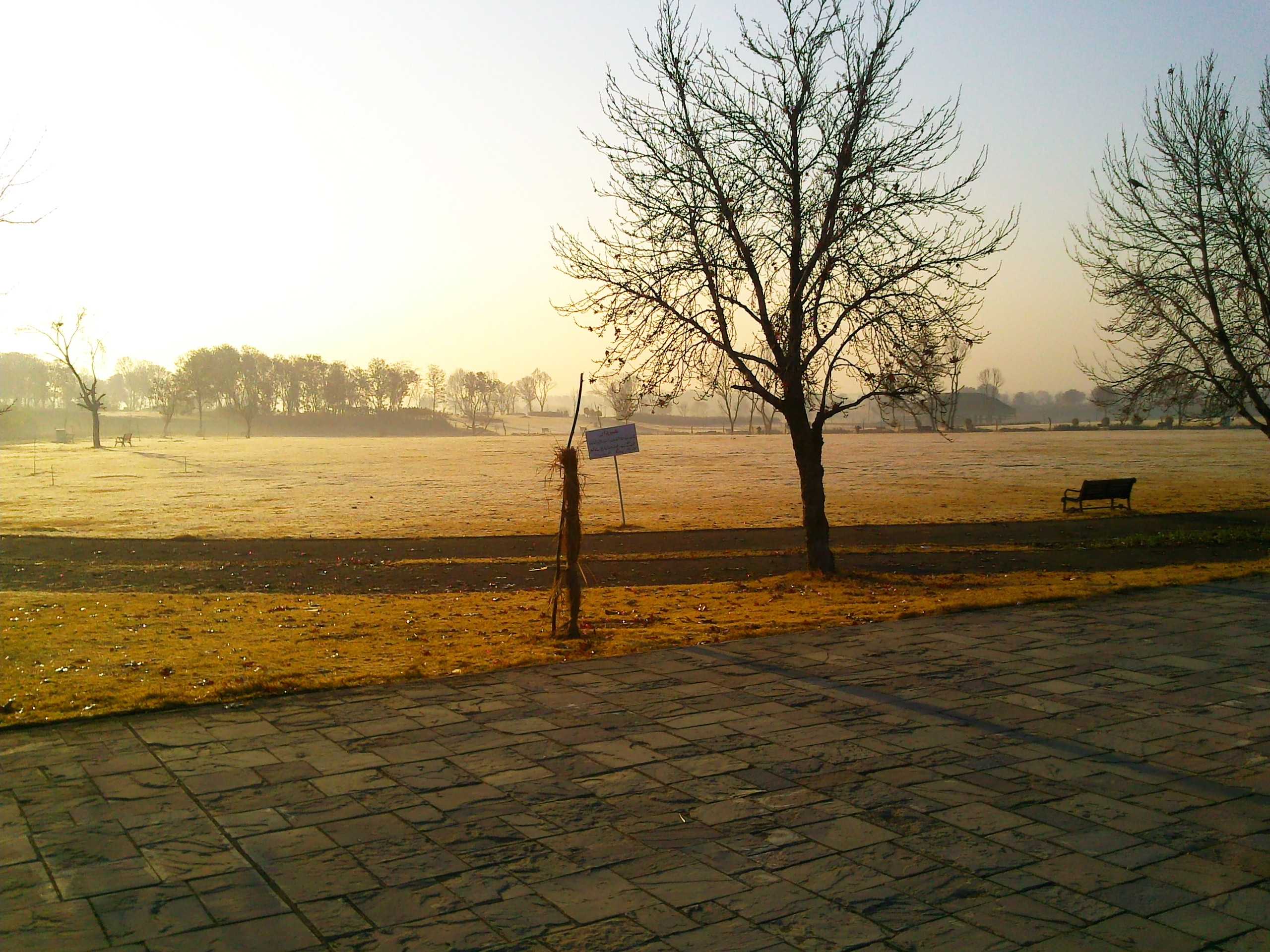
Early morning view in winters

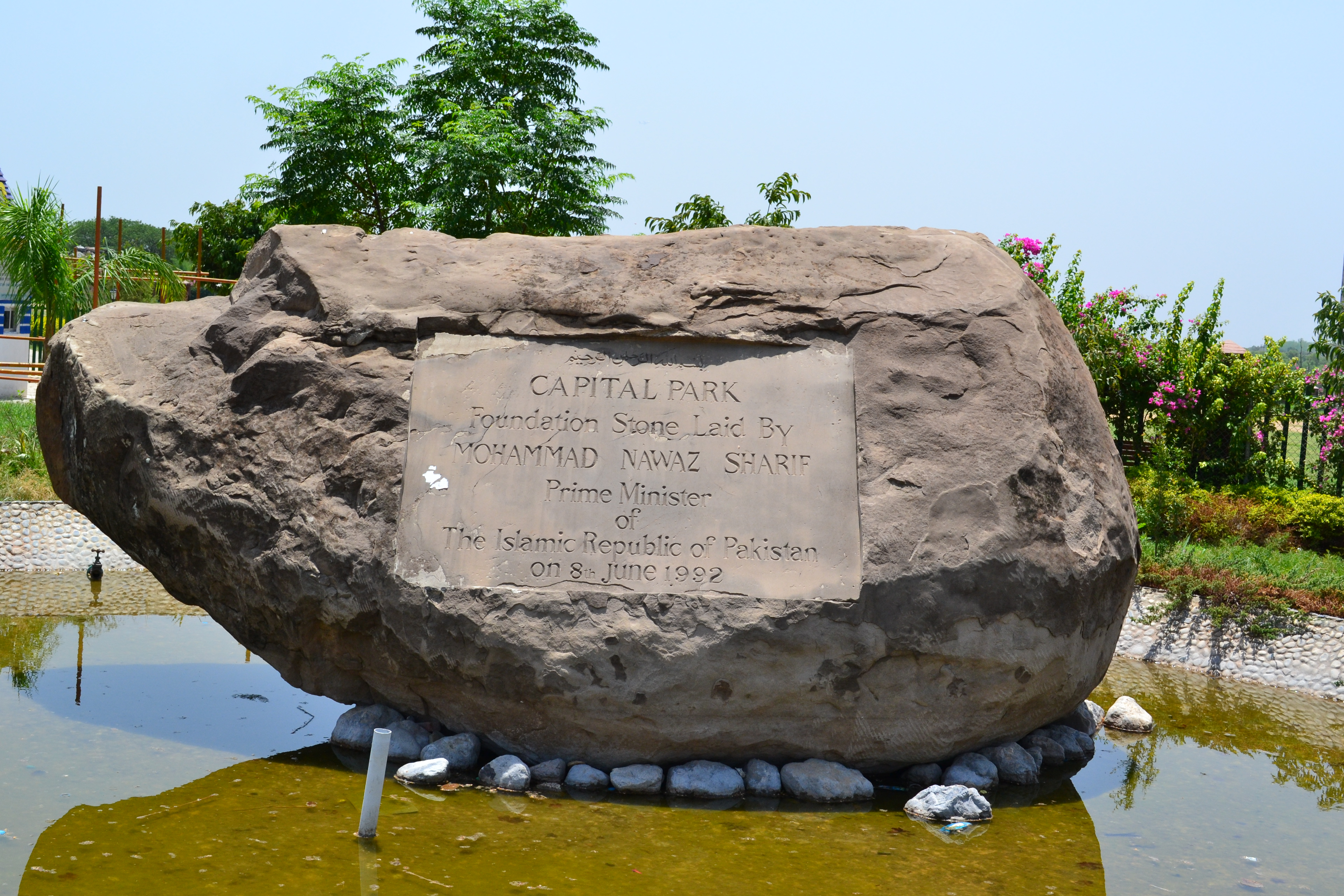
Foundation stone

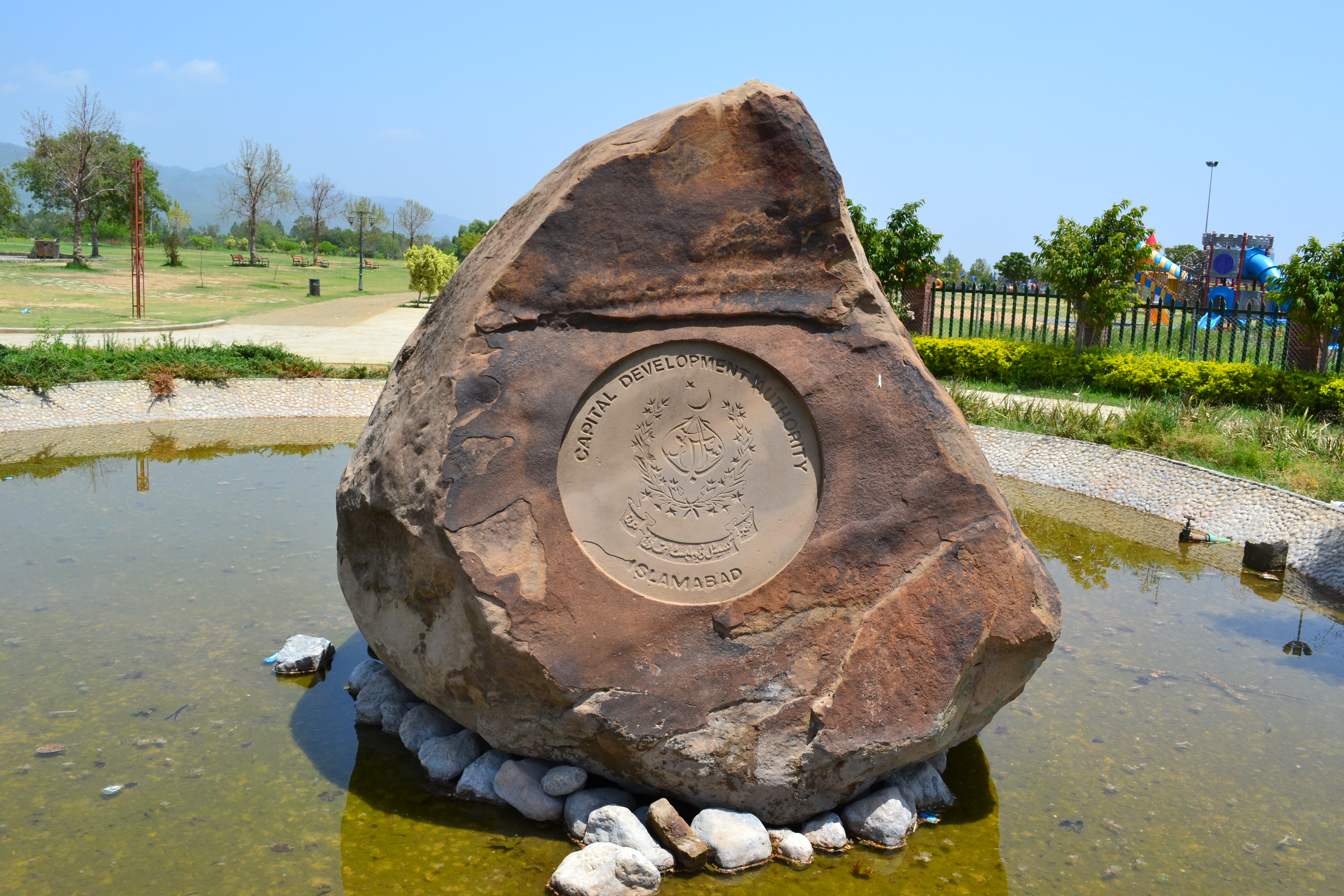
Foundation stone

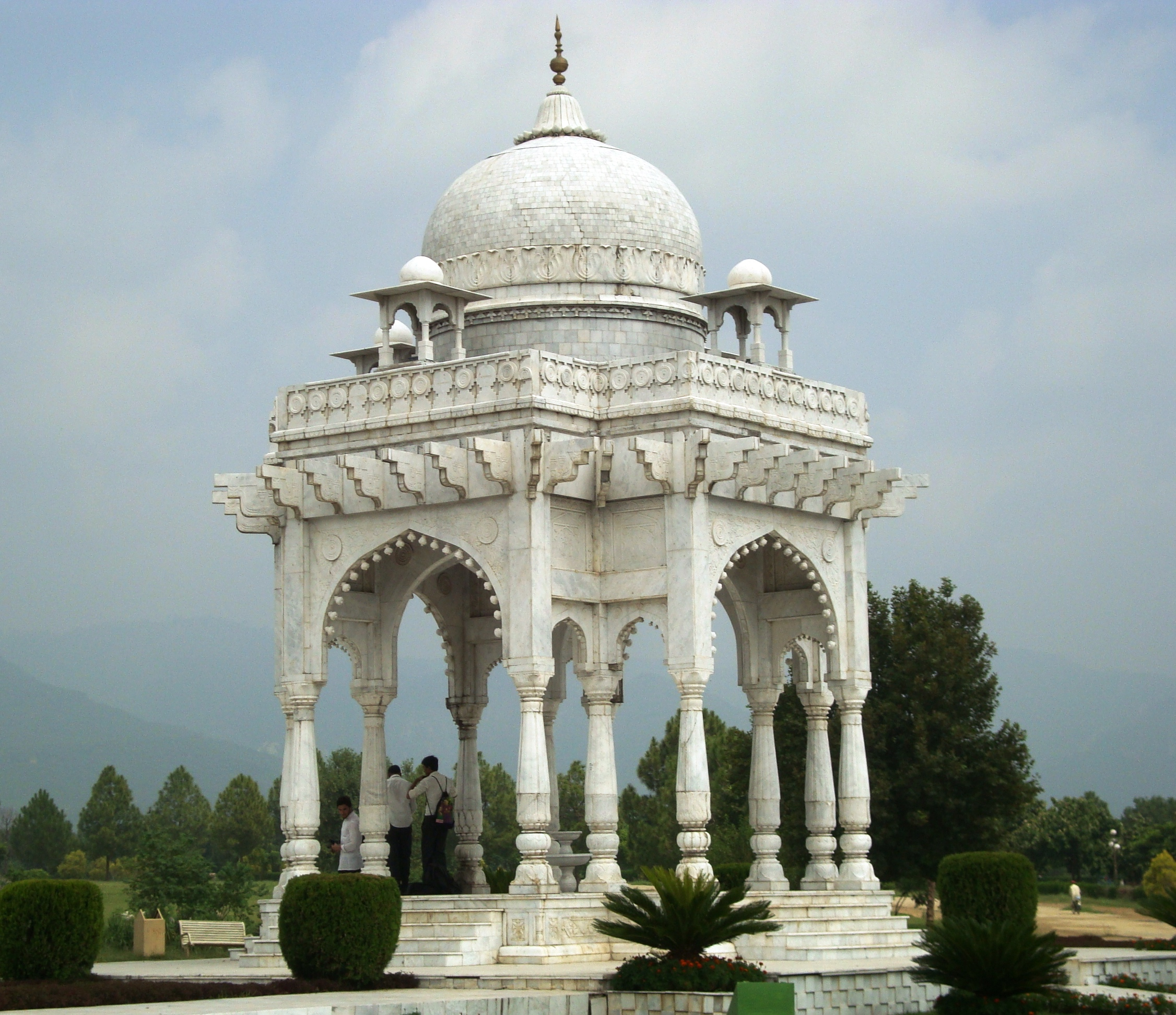
Baradari

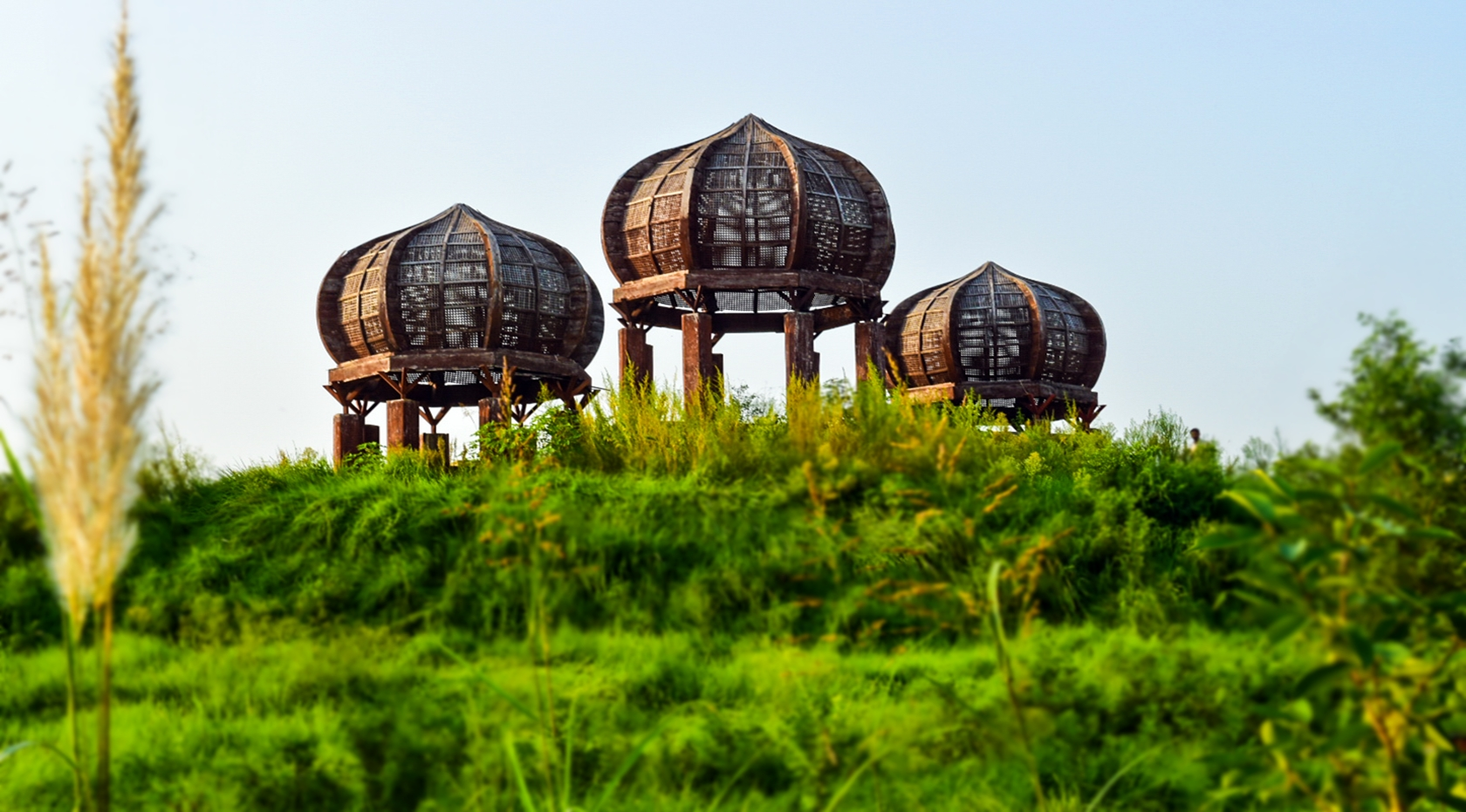
The three domes

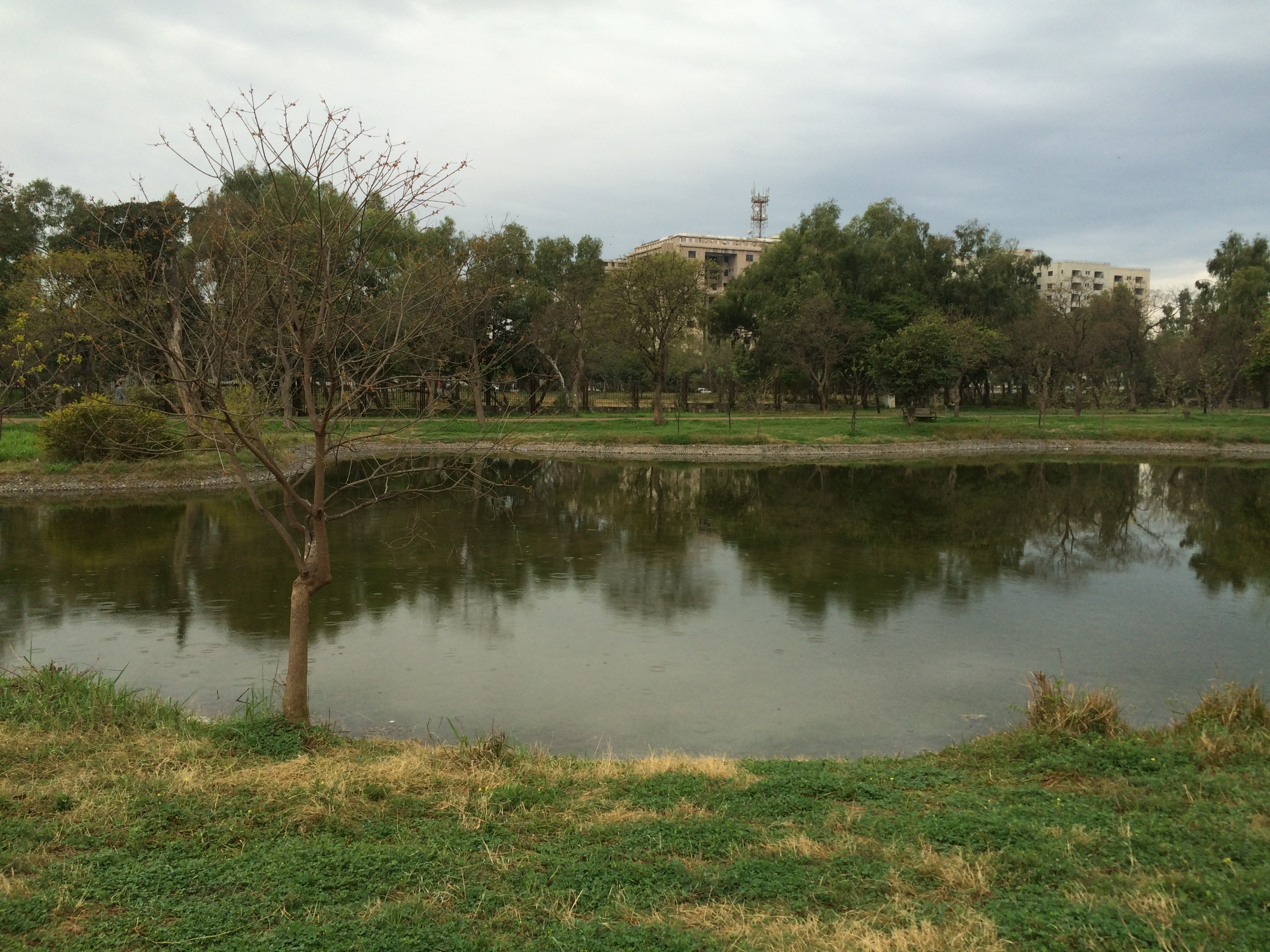
A pond in the Park

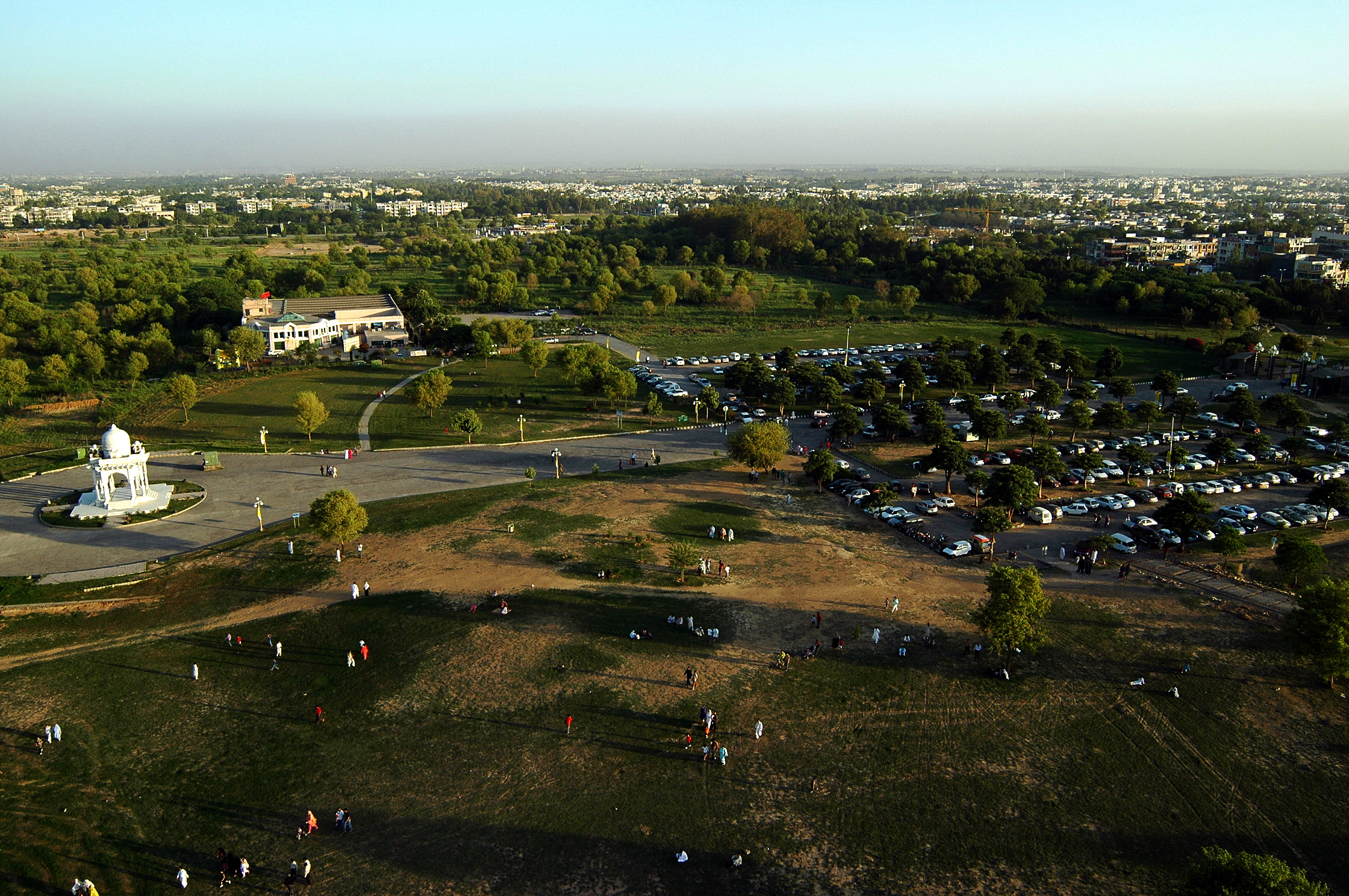
Aerial view of the park's western side

== See also ==
- List of parks and gardens in Pakistan
- List of parks and gardens in Lahore
- List of parks and gardens in Karachi
