= Sectors of Islamabad =

Administrative divisions of Islamabad, Pakistan

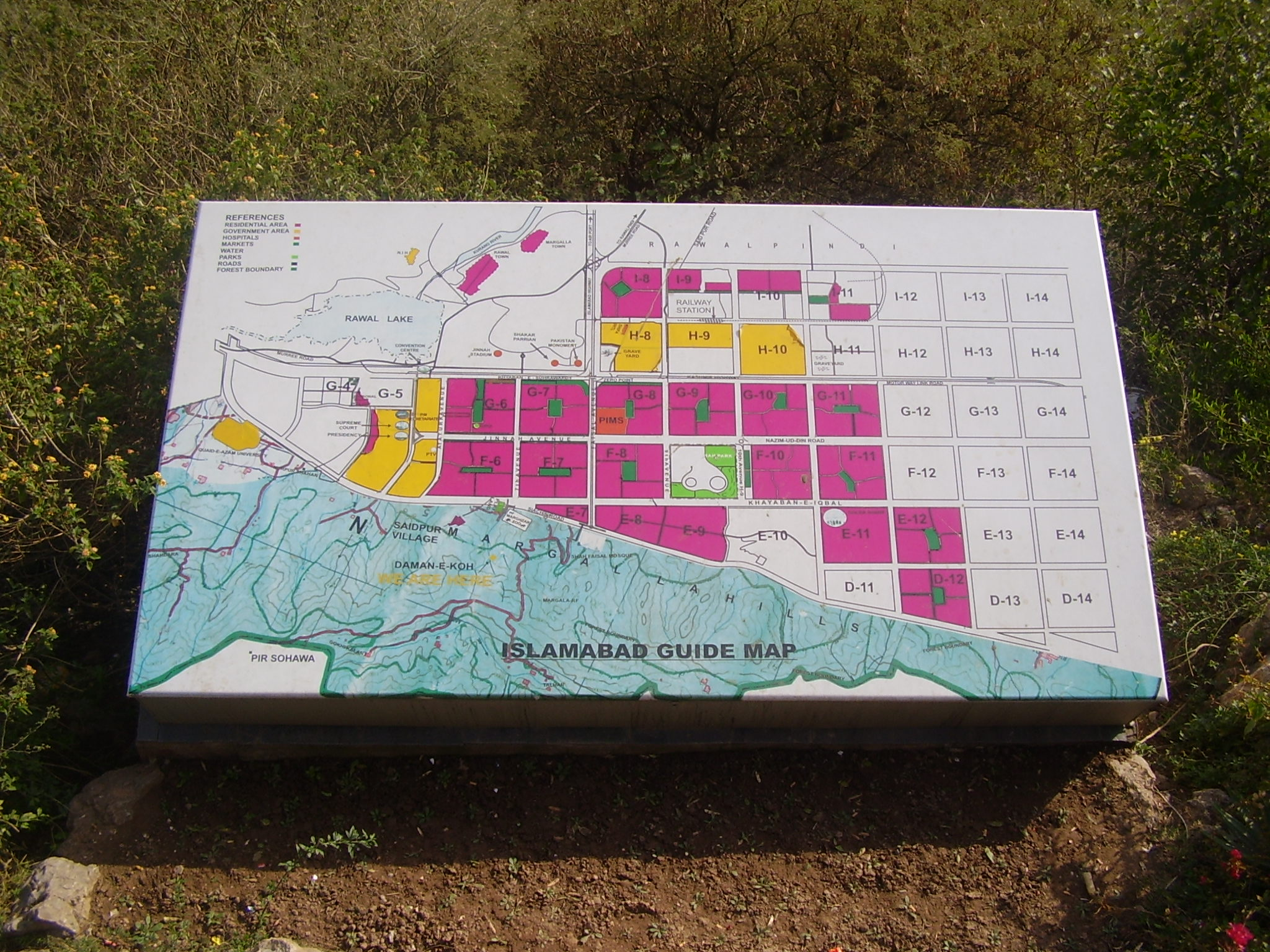
Guide map of northeast Islamabad with its sectors

Sectors of Islamabad are administrative divisions of Zone I and Zone II of the Islamabad Capital Territory region. The capital territory is divided into 5 zones, of which Zone I and Zone II have been designated urban development zones.

== Naming & numbering ==
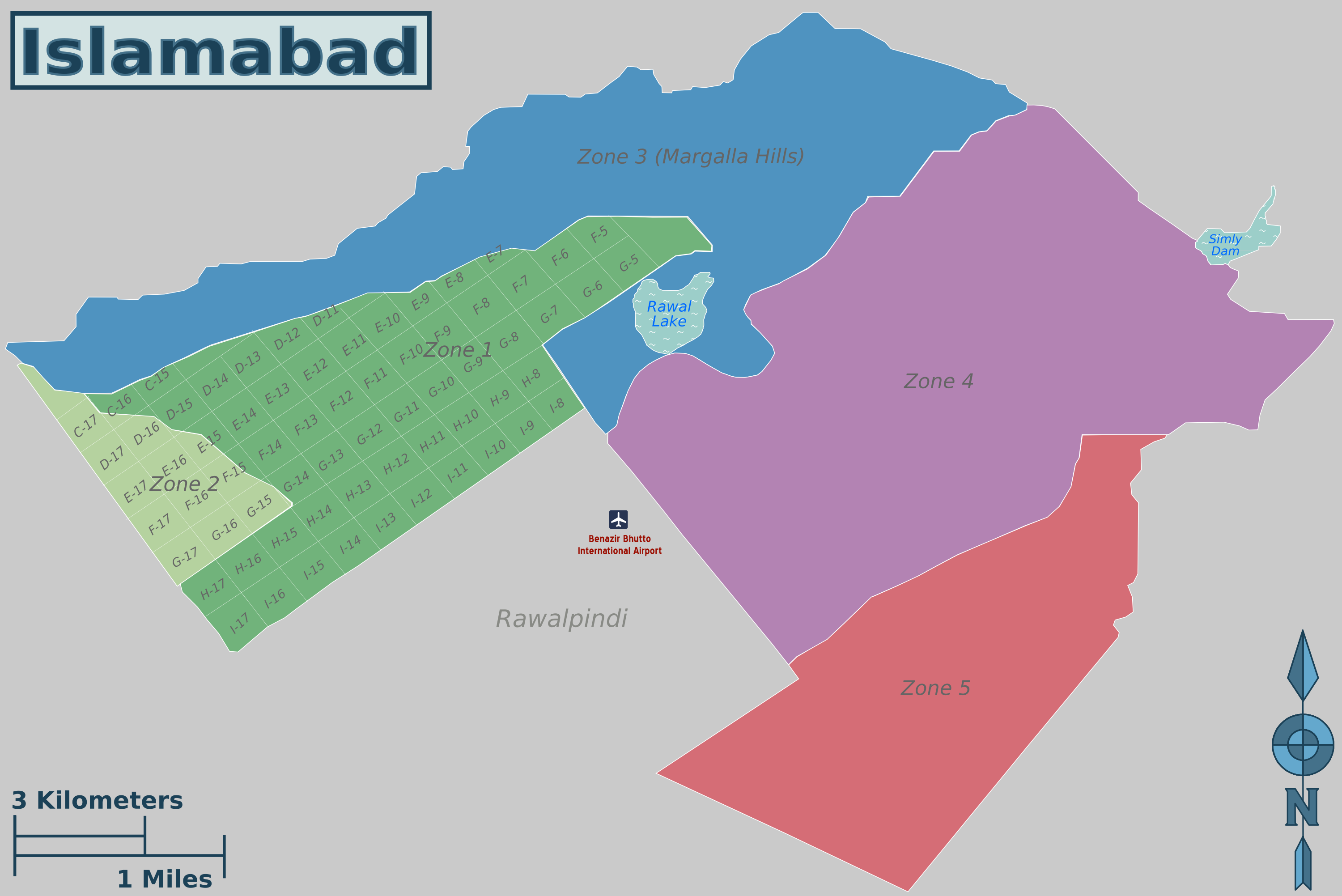
The five zones of Islamabad. Zone I and Zone II are further subdivided into sectors

Each square shaped sector is named by combining Latin letters and numerals together. The sector letters increase north to south from A to O, while sector number increases east to west from 1 to 20. However, at present time, sectors A to I and 5 to 18 are currently open for urban development.

== List of sectors ==
This is a list of all planned and constructed sectors.

- Red Zone
  - Pakistan Secretariat
- Diplomatic Enclave

=== B-sectors ===
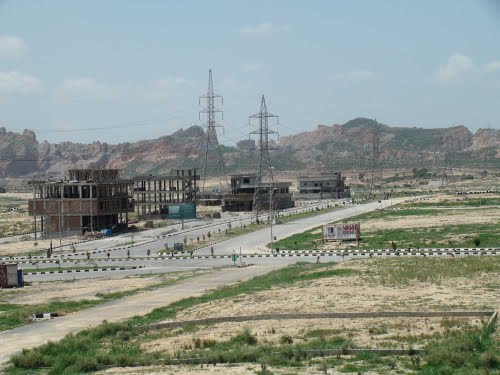
CDA's Multi Gardens project at B-17
- B-17, Islamabad

=== C-sectors ===
- C-14, Islamabad
- C-15, Islamabad

=== D-sectors ===
- D-12, Islamabad
- D-17, Islamabad

=== E-sectors ===
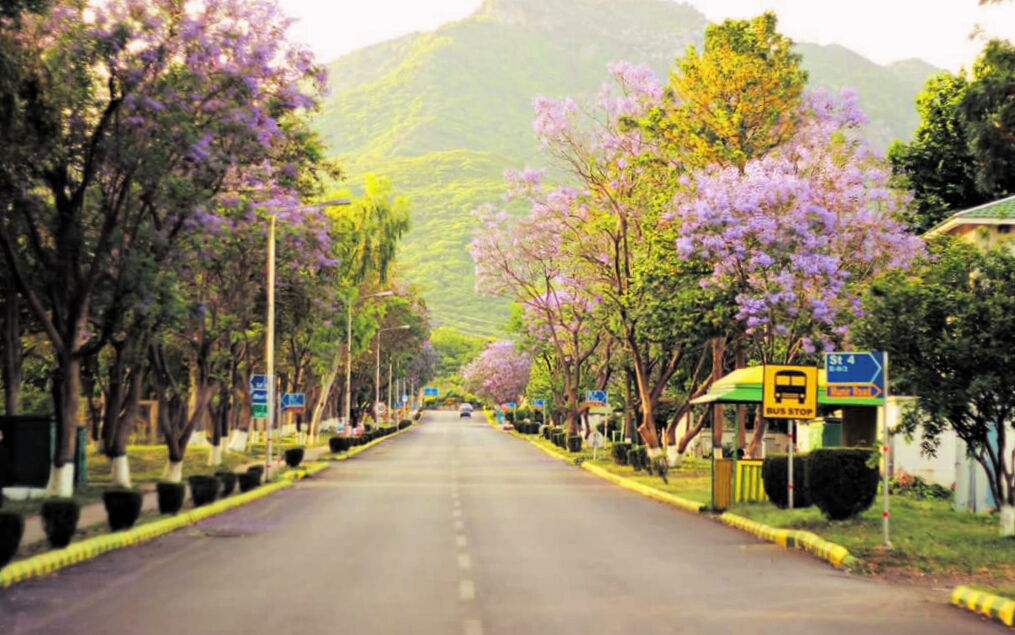
Sector E-9

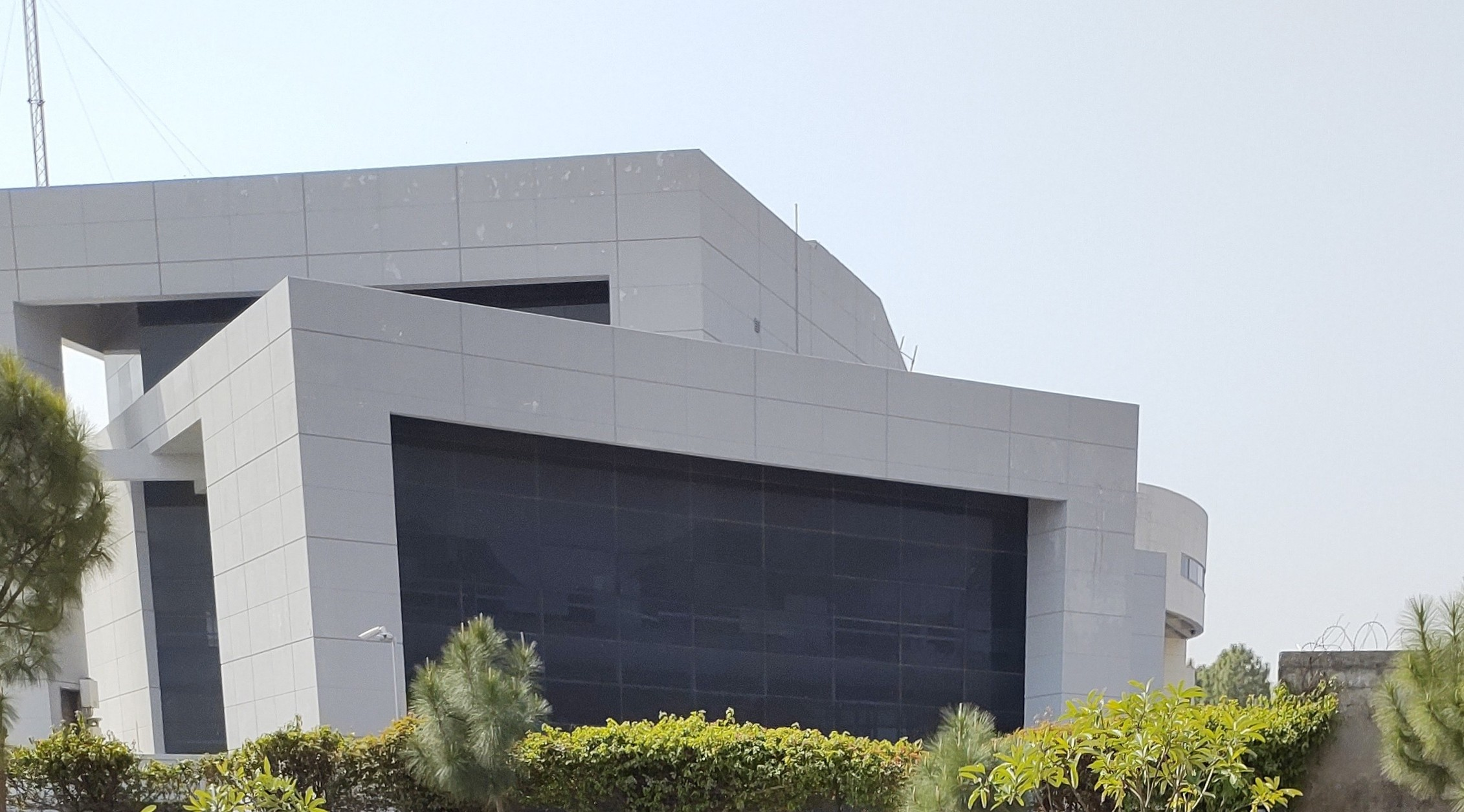
Air University, E-9
- E-7, Islamabad
- E-8, Islamabad
- E-9, Islamabad
- E-10, Islamabad
- E-11, Islamabad
- E-12, Islamabad
- E-16, Islamabad
- E-17, Islamabad

=== F-sectors ===
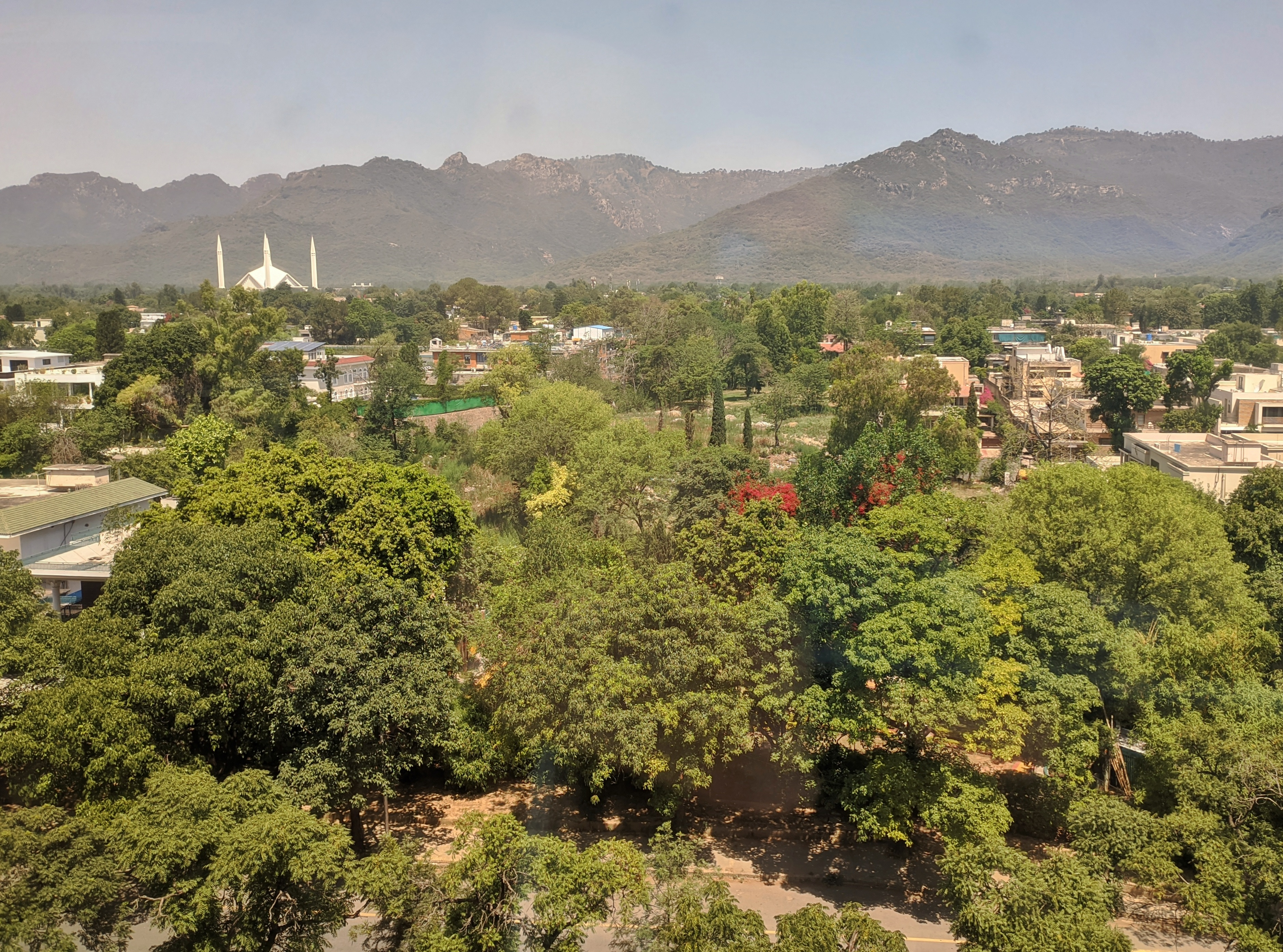
View of Faisal Mosque and Margalla hills from F-7 sector

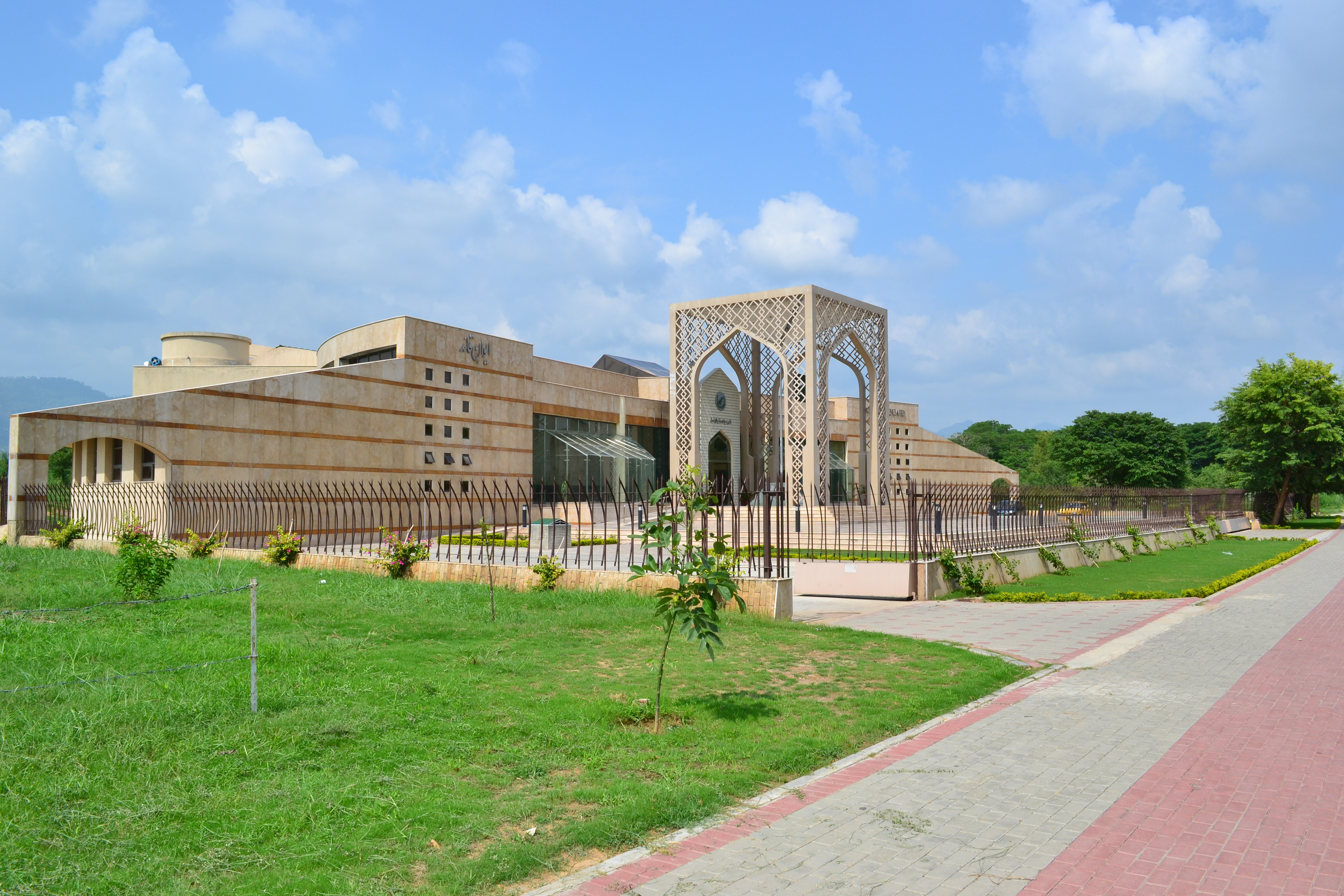
Aiwan e Quaid, F-9

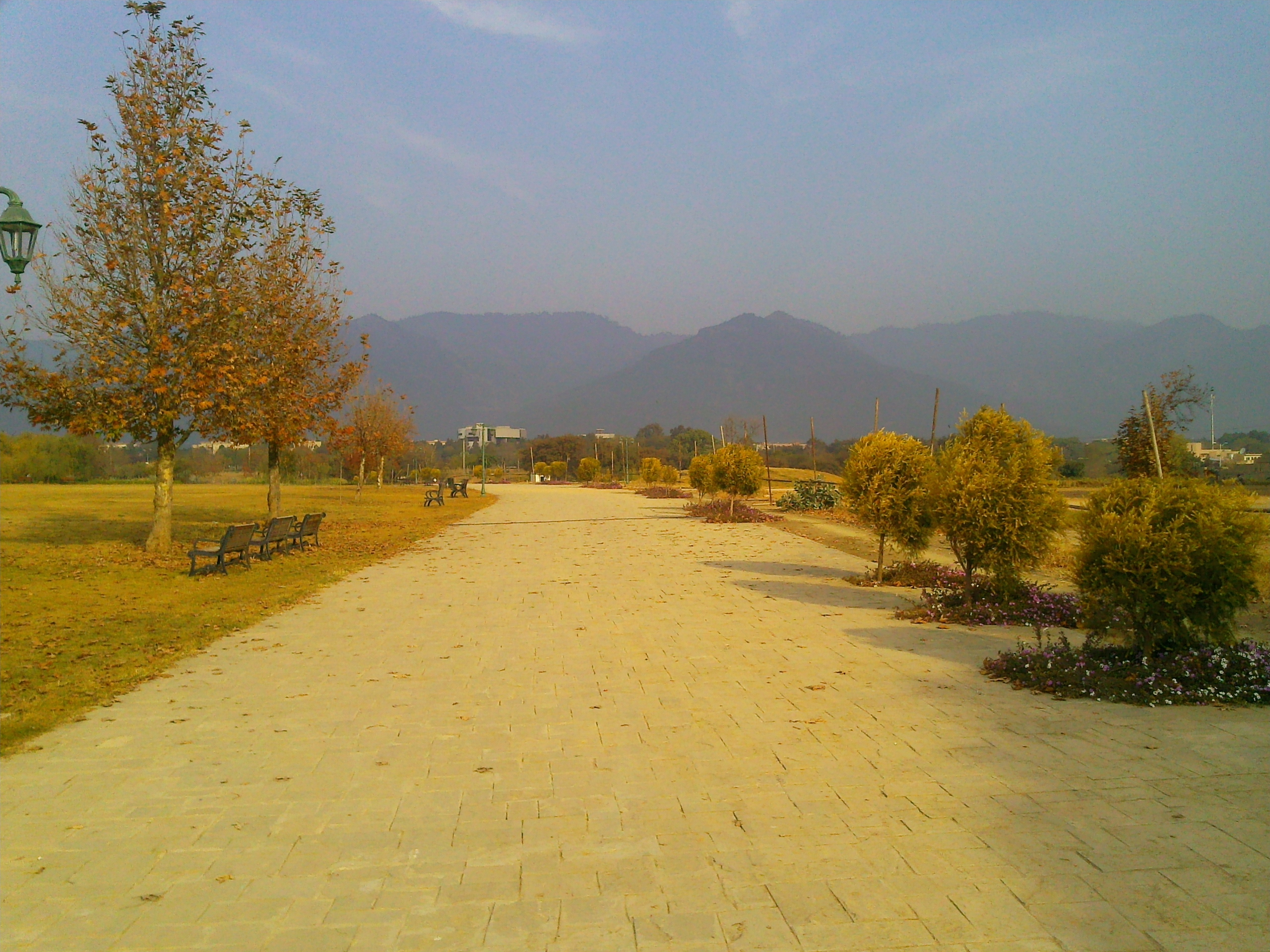
Fatima Jinnah Park, F-9
- F-5, Islamabad
- F-6, Islamabad
- F-7 (Urdu: حلقہ ف ٧) is a sector of Islamabad. The sector is located at the foothills of Margalla Hills of Islamabad. It is well known for its markaz/commercial area named "Jinnah Super Market" which is one of the most recognized and iconic shopping areas of Islamabad. It hosts a huge number of shops, restaurants, libraries, and casual dining areas. There are the designer shops, cafes, eateries, banks, bookstores, gift and CD shops, and service facilities. In July 2020, the first charging station was set up at one of PSO stations located in F7, Islamabad by the Federal Ministry of Energy.
- F-8, Islamabad
- Fatima Jinnah Park (Sector F-9 Park), Islamabad
- F-10, Islamabad
- F-11, Islamabad

=== G-sectors ===
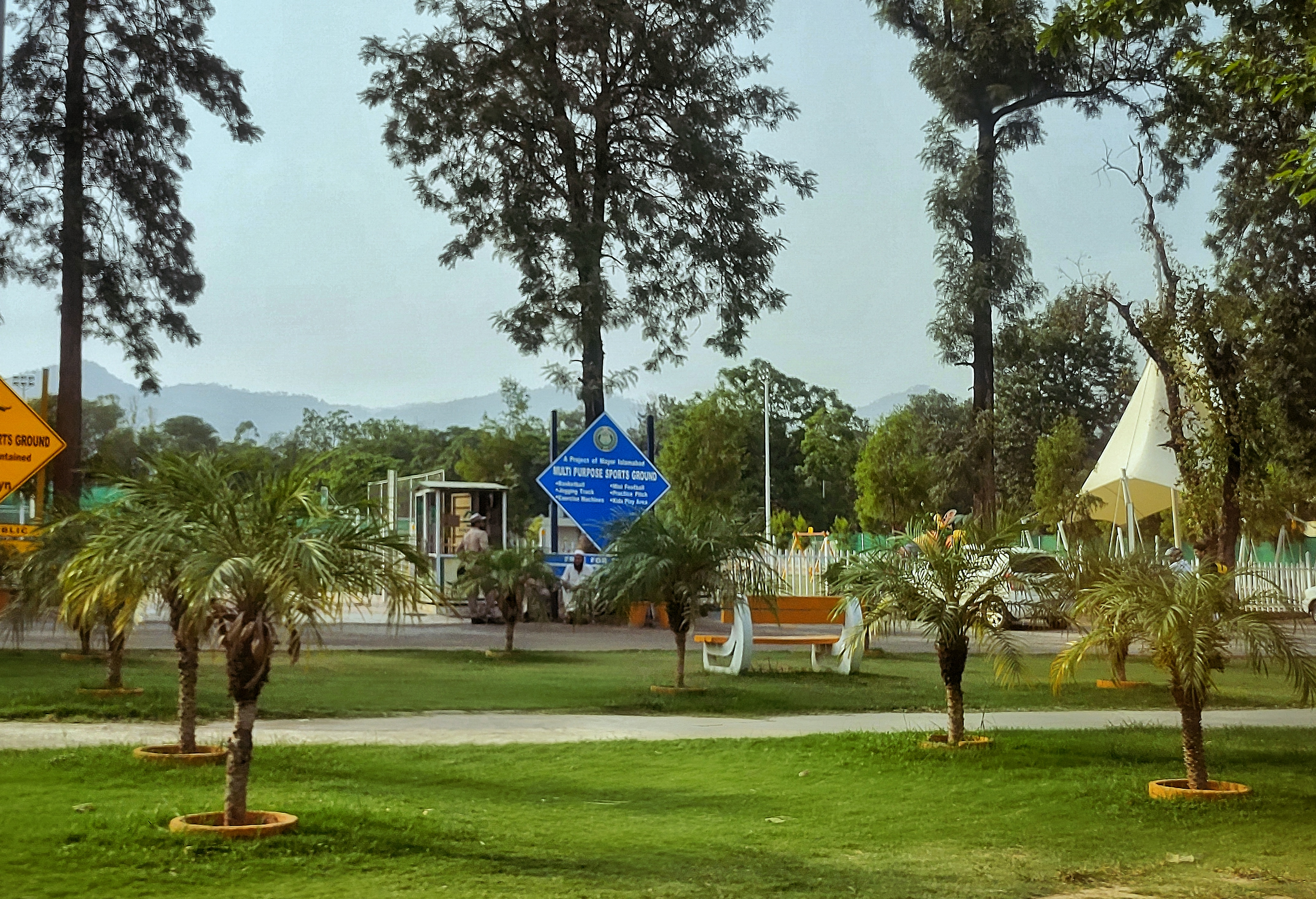
A multipurpose sports facility at G-5

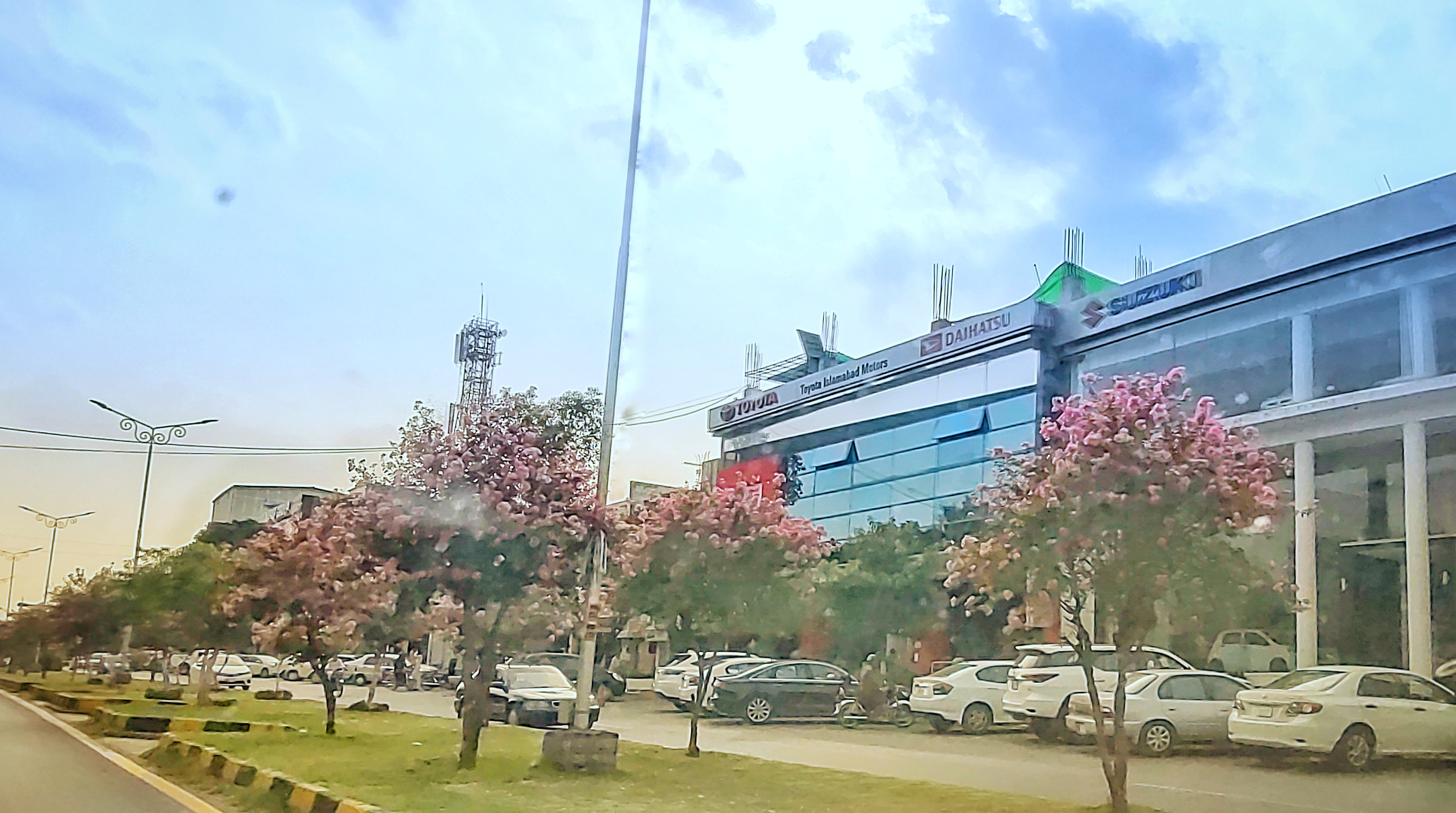
Aabpara Market at G-6 is the oldest market of Islamabad

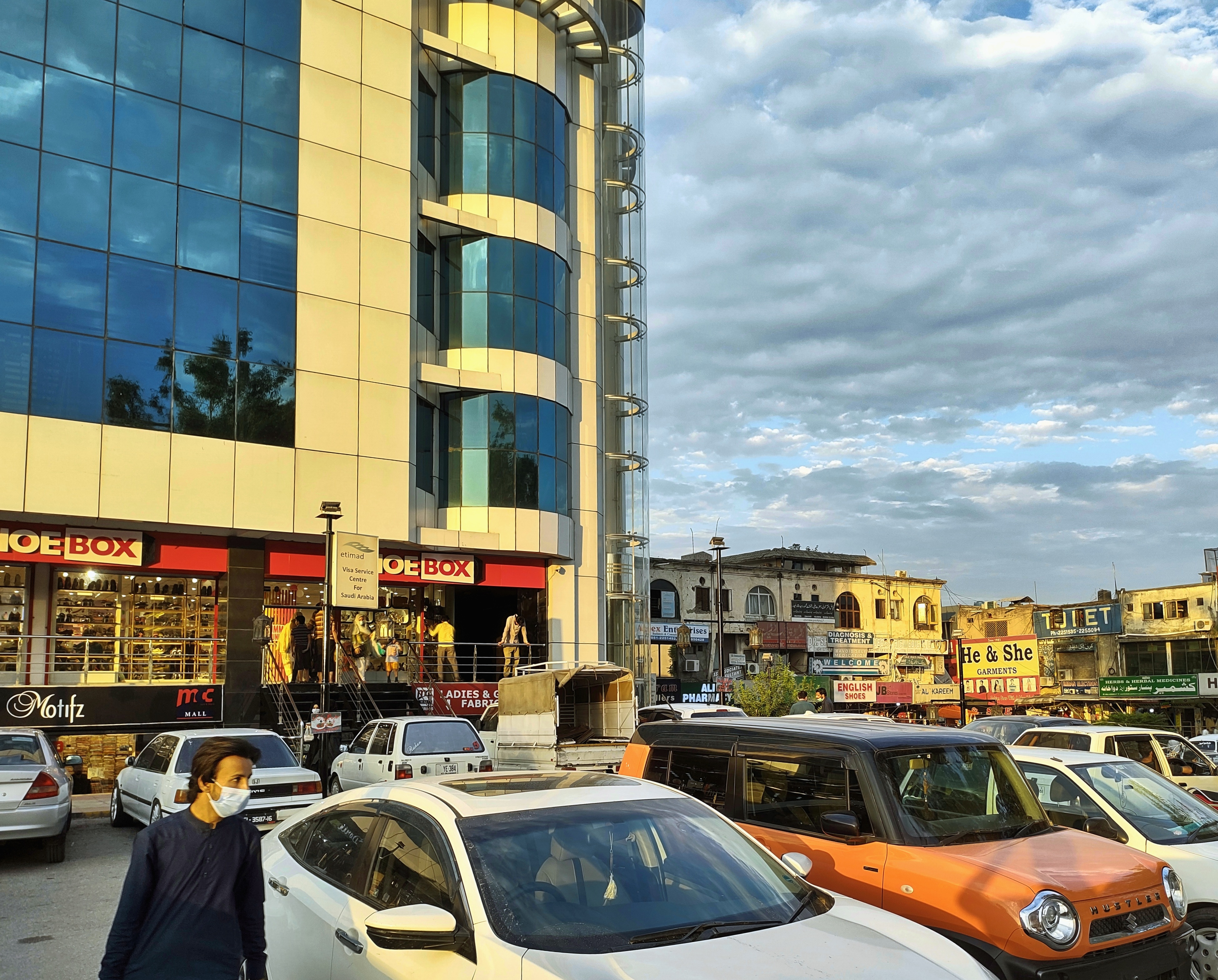
G-9 Markaz or Karachi Company

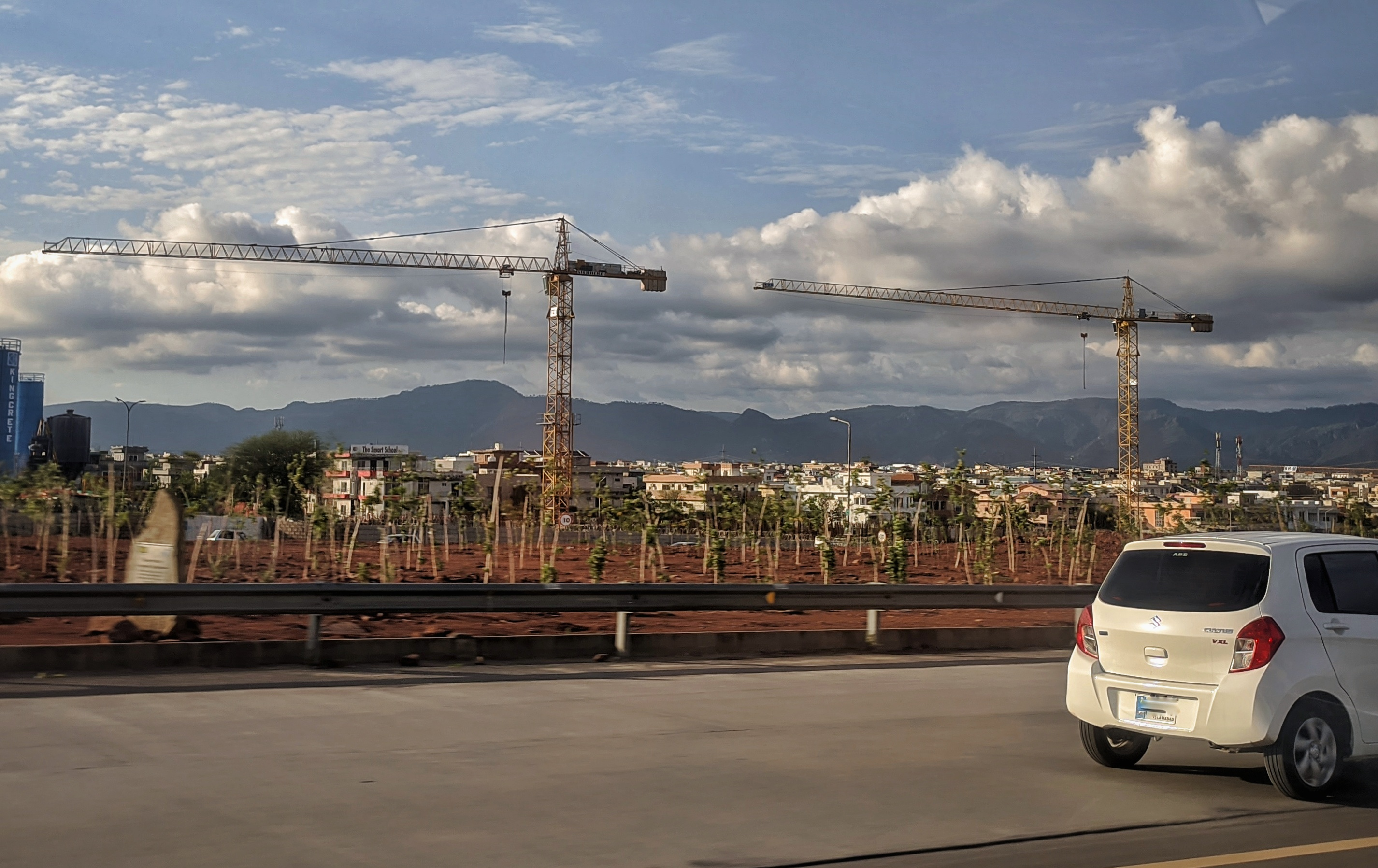
G-13, Islamabad
- Ramna-4 Diplomatic Enclave(G-4), Islamabad
- Ramna-5 Diplomatic Enclave(G-5), Islamabad
- G-5, Islamabad
- G-6, Islamabad
- G-7, Islamabad
- G-8, Islamabad
- G-9, Islamabad
- G-10, Islamabad
- G-11, Islamabad
- G-13, Islamabad
- G-14, Islamabad

=== H-sectors ===
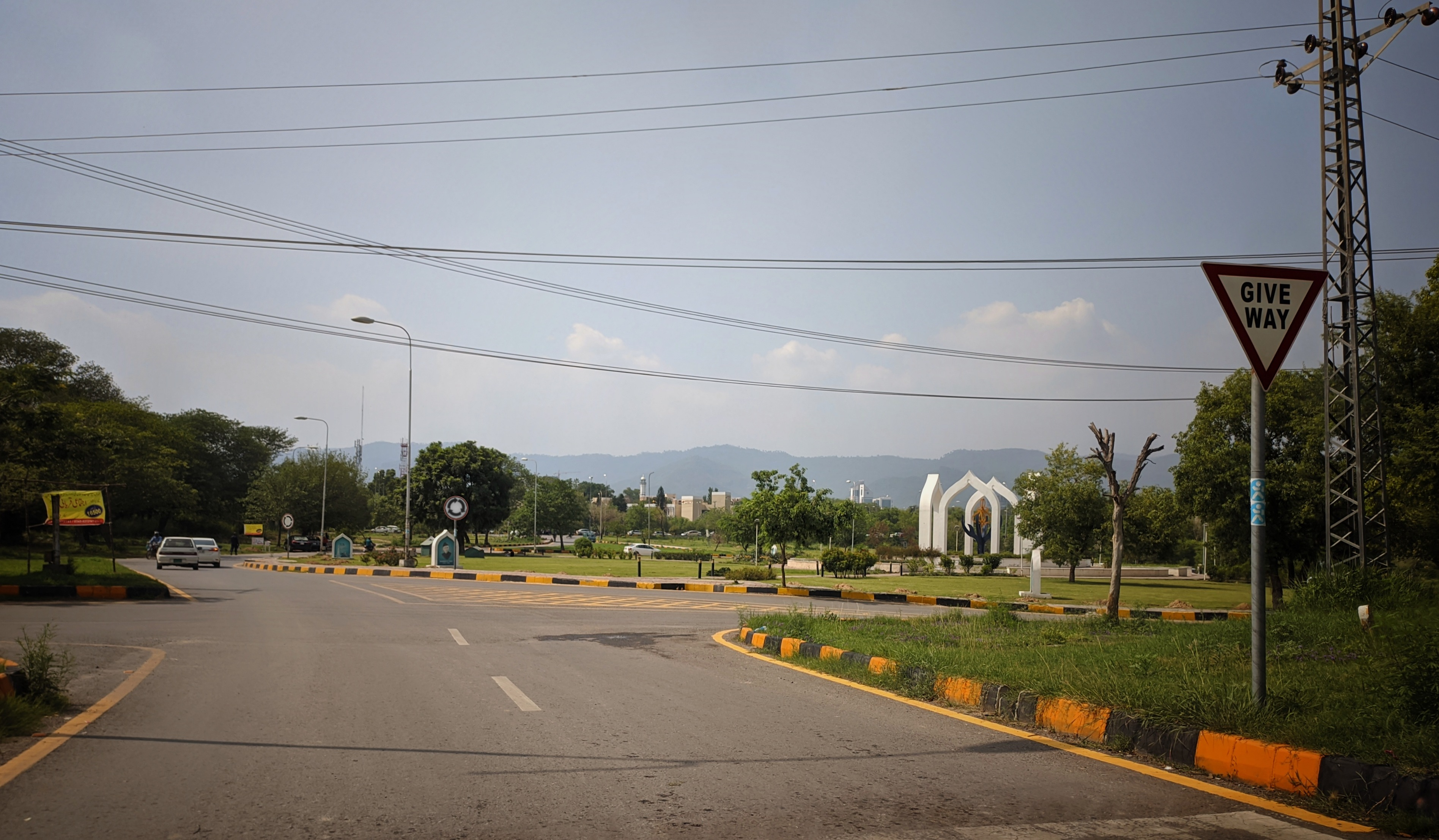
Riphah Knowledge Park, H-8

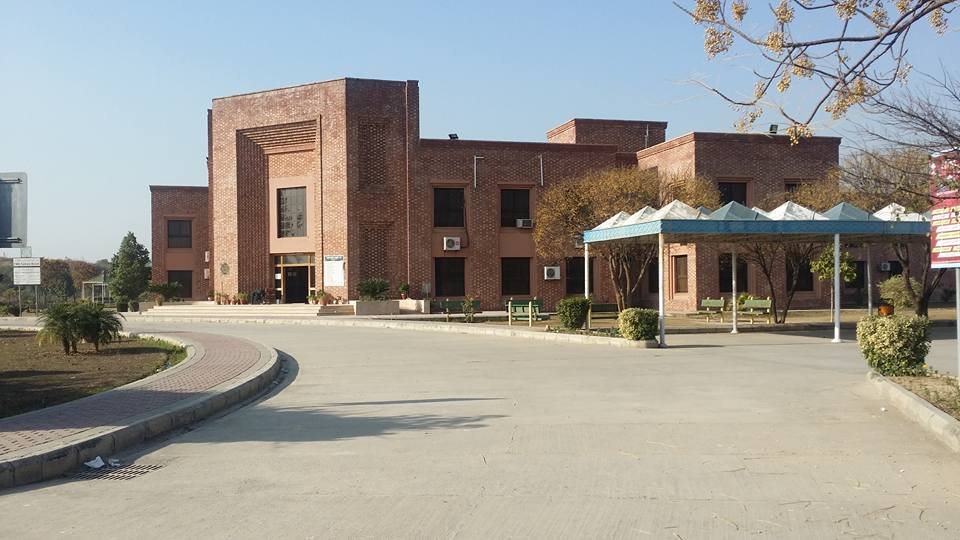
International Islamic University, H9

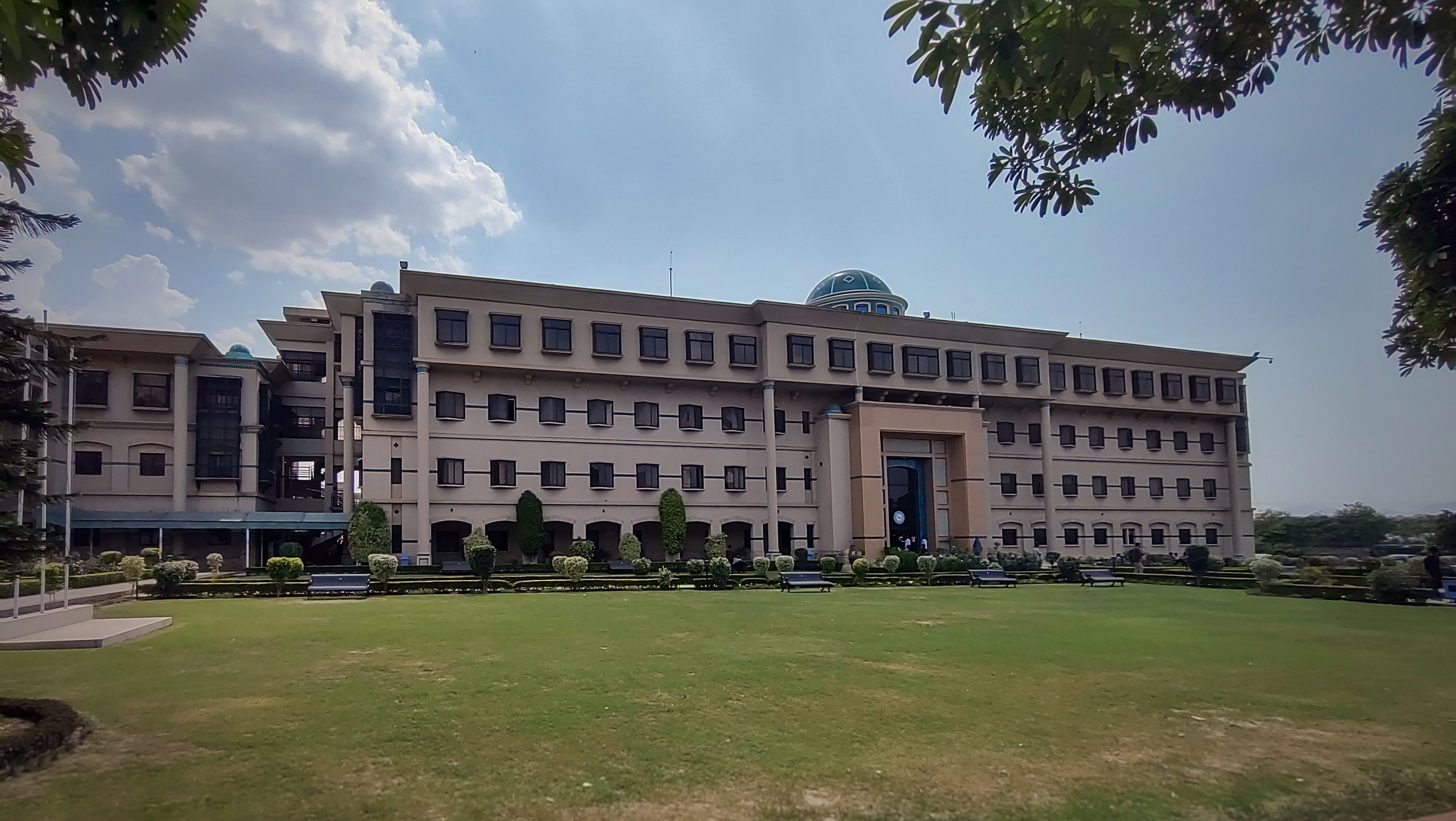
National University of Computer and Emerging Sciences, H-11

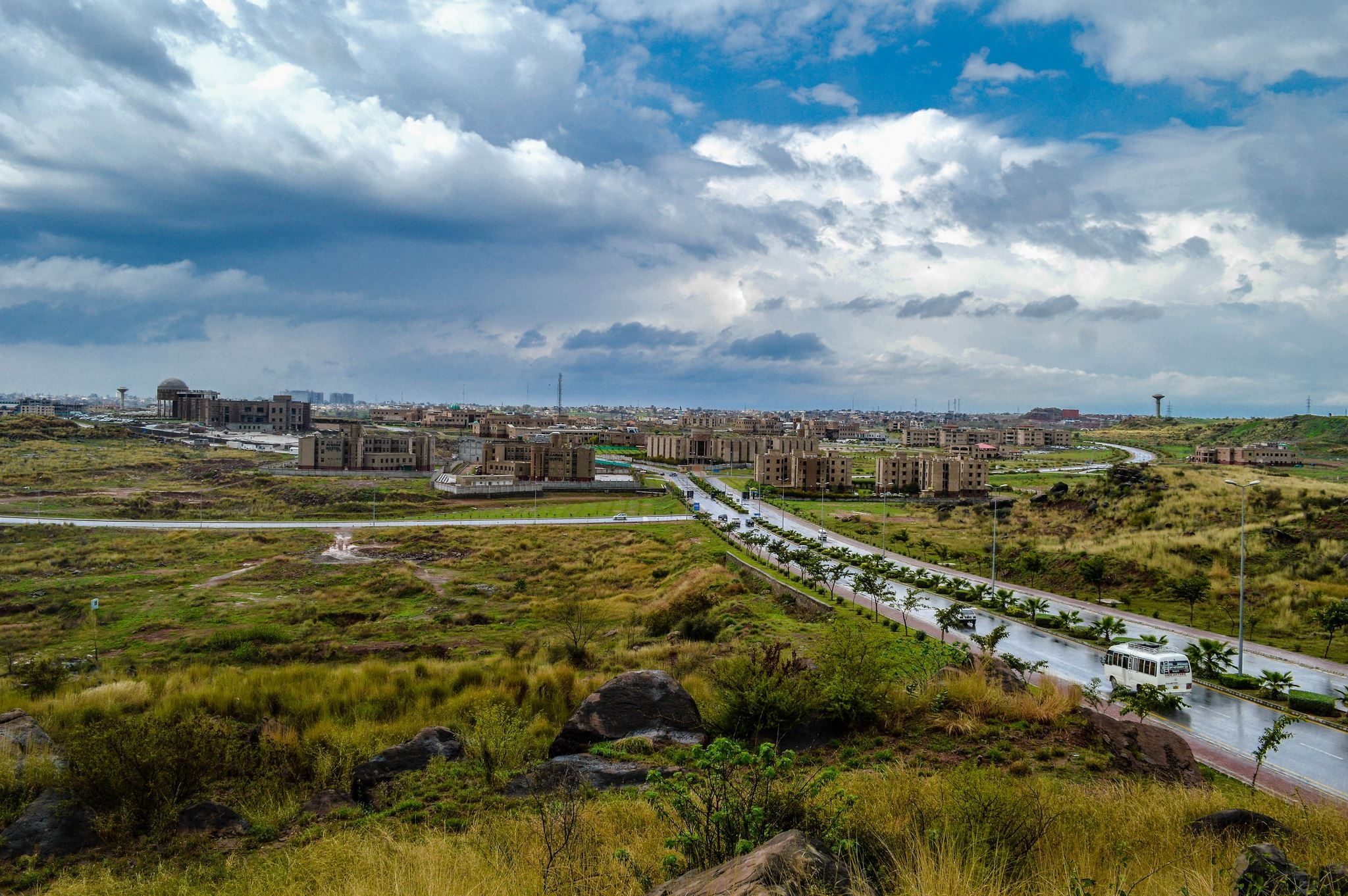
National University of Sciences and Technology, H-12
- H-8, Islamabad
- H-9, Islamabad
- International Islamic University Islamabad(IIUI H-10), Islamabad
- H-11, Islamabad
- National University of Science and Technology(NUST H-12), Islamabad

=== I-sectors ===
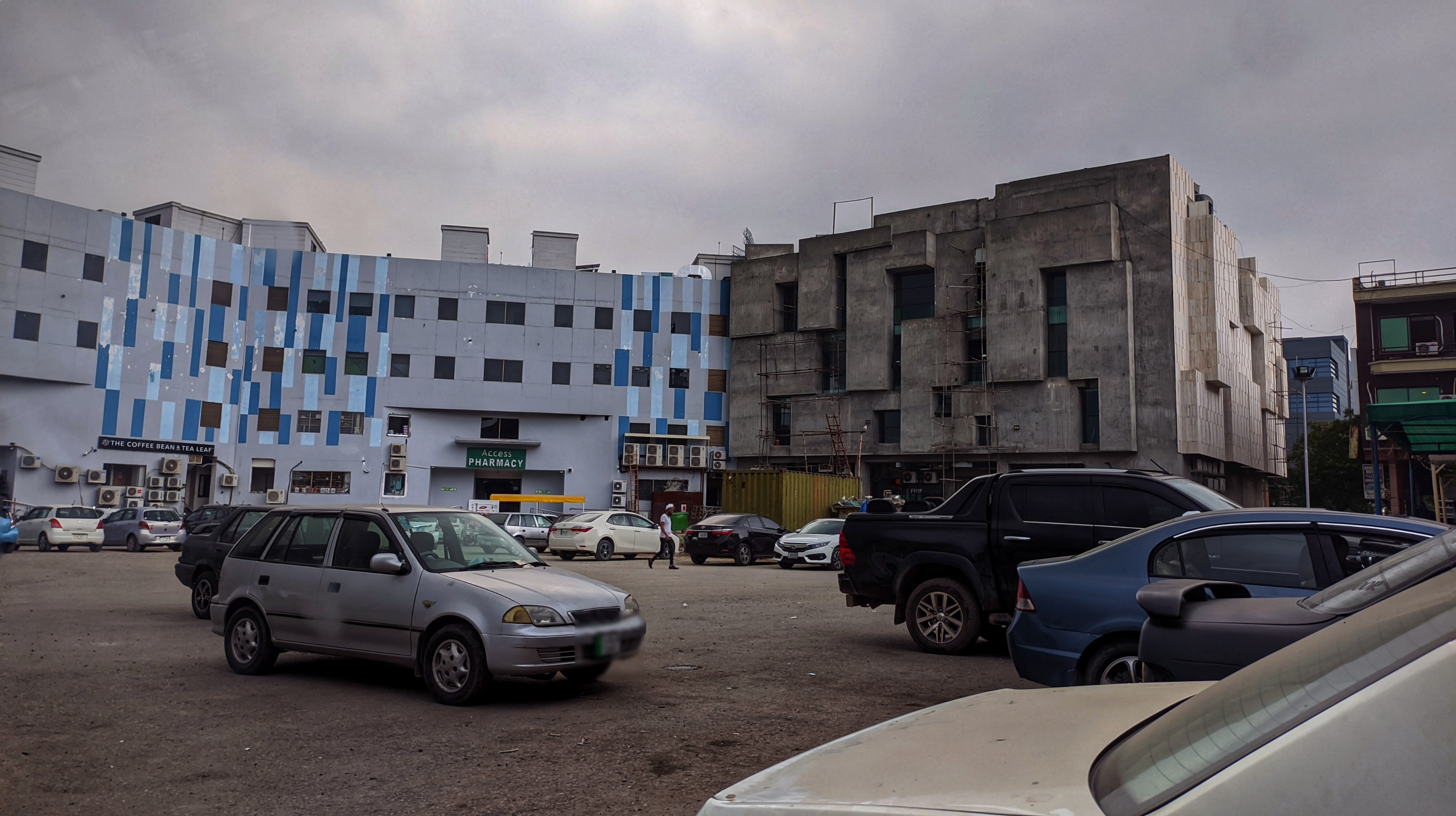
I-8 Markaz

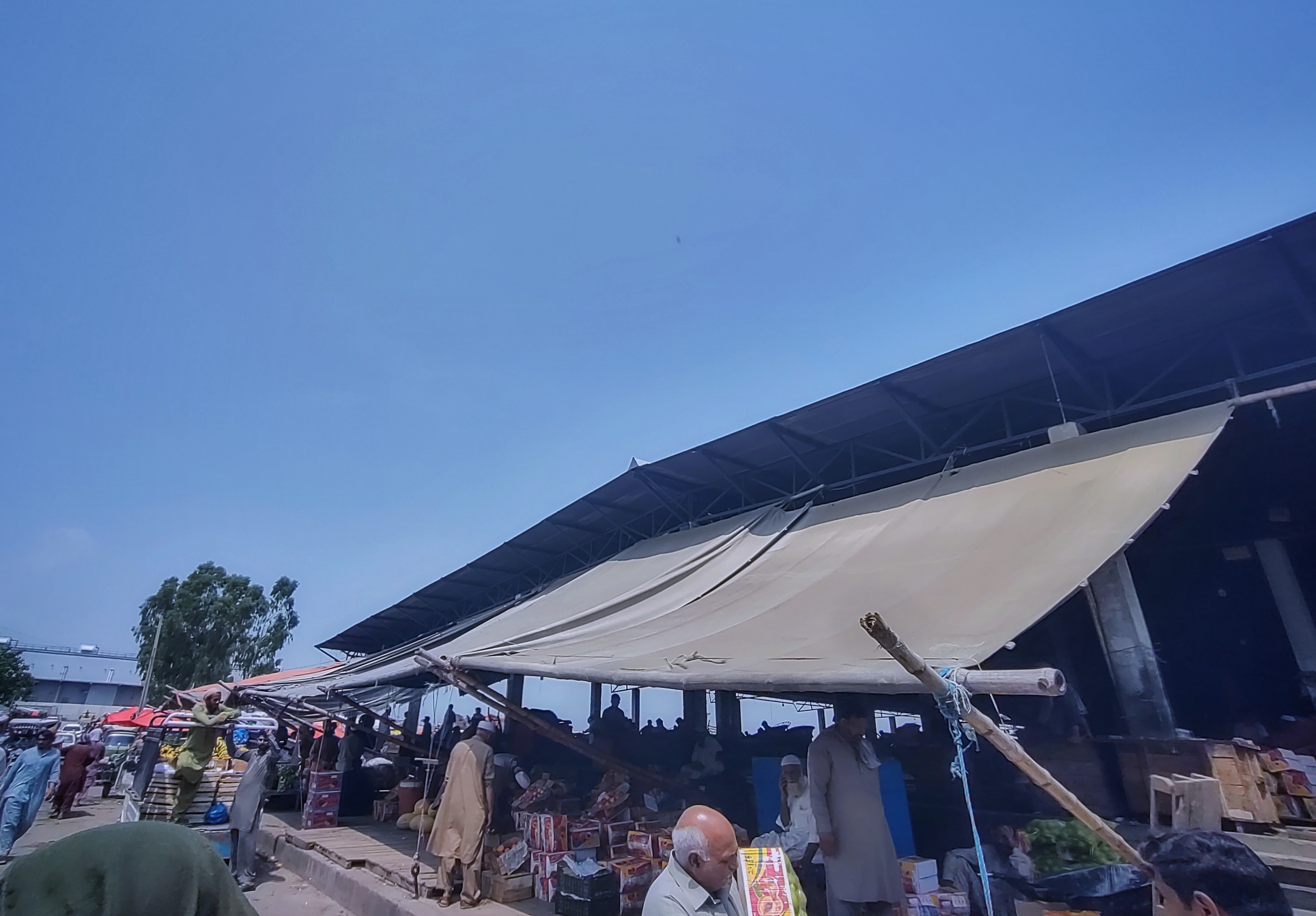
Fruit and Vegetable Market, I-11
- I-8, Islamabad
- I-9, Islamabad
- I-10, Islamabad
- I-11, Islamabad
- I-12, Islamabad
- I-14, Islamabad
- I-15, Islamabad
- I-16, Islamabad

== See also ==
- Union councils of Islamabad
