= Echoes of Honor =

1998 novel by David Weber

- First edition
- Author: David Weber
- Cover artist: David Mattingly
- Series: Honor Harrington
- Genre: Military science fiction
- Publisher: Baen Books
- Publication date: 1998
- Pages: 592
- ISBN: 0-671-87892-1
- OCLC: 41925871
- Preceded by: In Enemy Hands
- Followed by: Ashes of Victory

Echoes of Honor is a science fiction novel by American writer David Weber. It is the eighth book in the Honor Harrington series.

The novel is divided into six "books". Books 1, 3 and 5 describe the unfolding course of the Manticore-Haven war, while Books 2, 4 and 6 focus on the exploits of Honor and her allies on the prison planet Hades, also known as "Hell".

== Plot summary ==
At the start of the narrative, it seems that Honor has died, with her "execution" being televised on a holo-disc. In response, both Grayson and Manticore hold state funerals, with an empty casket laid to rest in the Royal Cathedral. While the Manticoran people are stunned by the news of Honor's demise, the Graysons are utterly incensed.

However, the footage was faked because Honor is still alive and plotting her return. Having survived the destruction of Cordelia Ransom's ship in the previous book, Honor and her allies hide on the surface of Hades, monitoring StateSec's communications and linking with other prisoners held on the planet. Eventually they launch a surprise attack, defeating the local Havenite garrison and taking control of Hell.

Meanwhile, the Havenite Navy, under the new and aggressive leadership of Admiral Esther McQueen, goes on the offensive and launches a series of simultaneous and devastating attacks on Manticore and her allies, even hitting Manticoran territory for the first time in the war. The Manticorans, however, are testing some new weapon systems which may definitively shift the balance in their favor.

Back on Hell and now in control of the State Security facilities, Honor's party travels across the inhospitable planet and helps the prisoners escape from Camp Charon. When news of the offensive led by McQueen reach Hades, they realize that they cannot count on a Manticoran rescue mission. Still needing to escape from the planet, Honor and her allies hatch a plan to capture as many Havenite ships as possible. With a sizable fleet of captured enemy vessels (the so-called "Elysian Space Navy") under her leadership, the former prisoners defeat a StateSec armada and evacuate the prison planet.

After two years, Honor finally returns home, along with half a million former political prisoners and POWs.

== Reviews ==
- Review by Carolyn Cushman (1998) in Locus, #450 July 1998

Preceded by In Enemy Hands	Honor Harrington books	Succeeded by Ashes of Victory
