= Ayub Market =

Commercial center in Islamabad, Pakistan

Ayub Market (Urdu: ایوب مرکز), also known as F-8 Markaz is a commercial center located in Sector F-8, Islamabad. The market is mainly occupied by District courts, government offices of the Islamabad Capital Territory Administration and Margalla police station. There is also a foreigners registration center in the market.
