= List of educational institutions in Islamabad =

This is a list of educational institutions in the city of Islamabad, Pakistan.

== Primary and secondary educational institutions ==
- The Educators Capital Campus
- Aims Education System
- Olevels.com School
- Schola Nova F-8/3, Islamabad
- Imperial International School & College Islamabad, 316, Service Rd North, F-10/3, Islamabad
- Super Nova School, 16, Nazim Uddin, Rd, F-8/1, Islamabad
- Edopia
- The Green Valley Child Development Centre
- Siddeeq Public School
- TQM Model School, H13 (opposite G13 Sector), Islamabad, Pakistan
- Roots School System
- Beaconhouse School System
- Froebel's International School
- City School System
- Capital Development Authority Model School
- Lahore Grammar School
- The Oaks British School (Closed)
- PakTurk International Schools and Colleges
- Fazaia Education System School, Islamabad
- Smart School Systems
- Westminster School and College
- Oxbridge International Grammar School
- Faisal Model School, Tarlai Kalan Islamabad
- United City School System, Sector D-13 Islamabad
- Islamabad College of Arts and Sciences
- Bright Model School
- International Islamic University Islamabad Schools
- Jinnah Muslim School & College, Park Road, Taramari Chowk, Islamabad
- The Spirit School, Model Town Humak, Islamabad
- Treehouse School
- Decent Public School, H-13, Islamabad
- Islamabad Convent School — two high schools in F-8 and H-8 sectors, under the administration of the Catholic Church
- The Millennium Education Pakistan (Roots Millennium Schools Islamabad)

In Addition to the Schools listed above, there is a chain more than 150+ Government-owned schools and colleges named as "Islamabad Model School" and "Islamabad Model Colleges for boys and Girls". These schools are located in each sector of Islamabad.

=== Colleges and high schools ===
Following is the list of Secondary and Higher Secondary education institutes in Islamabad which are registered by the Federal Board of Intermediate and Secondary Education; All the government education institutes from Primary to college level works under the ambit of Federal Directorate of Education, Islamabad.

- Olevels.com School
- Superior school system, Jinnah Avenue, Bahria Enclave Road, Islamabad.
- Superior Group of Colleges, Chak Shahzad campus, Jinnah Avenue, Islamabad.
- Aims Education System
- Islamabad Model College for Boys F-10/3, Street 65 F-10/3 Islamabad
- Schola Nova F-8/3, Islamabad
- Republic College, Main GT Road, Opposite DHA Phase-2, Islamabad
- Imperial International School & College Islamabad, 316, Service Rd North, F-10/3, Islamabad
- Super Nova School, 16, Nazim Uddin, Rd, F-8/1, Islamabad
- OPF Boys College Islamabad
- Islamabad College for Boys, G-6/3
- CDA Model School
- Beaconhouse School System
- Bahria College Islamabad
- NIMLS College Islamabad
- Republic College
- Roots School System
- Froebel's International School
- Punjab College of Commerce
- Bahria foundation College Islamabad
- Fazaia Intermediate College, Islamabad
- Army Public Schools & Colleges System
- Grafton College Islamabad
- Institute of Islamic Sciences
- Indus Group of Colleges
- Polymathic Education System School & College
- School of Business and Management Islamabad
- Polymathic Universal School System
- Islamabad College of Arts and Sciences
- Jinnah Muslim School & College, Park Road, Taramari Chowk, Islamabad
- Future World Schools & Colleges Islamabad
- The Millennium Universal College Islamabad

The Ascend School Islamabad

- The Red Oak High by The Treehouse H-11

=== Multi-level schools ===
- Islamabad Japanese School - Elementary through Japanese junior high school year 3 (equivalent to Pakistani high school year 1)
- École Française d'Islamabad (Closed) - Nursery through high school/college (secondary school done by CNED correspondence)

== Tertiary and quaternary educational institutions ==
- Muslim Youth University (MYU), Islamabad
- Air University
- International Islamic University
- Al Faridia Islamic University
- Allama Iqbal Open University
- Alkauthar Islamic University
- Bahria University
- Capital University of Science & Technology
- Center for Advanced Studies in Engineering
- College of Physicians & Surgeons Pakistan
- COMSATS Institute of Information Technology
- Federal Urdu University of Arts, Science and Technology
- Foundation University, Islamabad
- Hamdard University
- Isra University
- Iqra University
- Preston University
- Institute of Space Technology
- Mohammad Ali Jinnah University
- National Defence University, Islamabad
- National University of Modern Languages
- National University of Sciences and Technology
- National University of Computer and Emerging Sciences
- Pakistan Institute of Development Economics
- Pakistan Institute of Engineering & Applied Sciences
- Quaid-i-Azam University
- Faridia Islamic University
- Riphah International University
- Shaheed Zulfiqar Ali Bhutto Institute of Science and Technology
- University College of Islamabad
- University of Lahore
- Virtual University of Pakistan
- Unique Institute Of Technical & Professional Education Islamabad
- The Millennium Universal College (TMUC) Islamabad
