= FDE =

FDE may refer to:

- Flower Delivery Express
- Federal Directorate of Education
- Førde Airport
  - Førde Airport, Øyrane, predecessor of Førde Airport

== Science and engineering ==
- Forensic document examination
- Forward Deployed Engineer
- First-degree entailment
- Fetch-decode-execute cycle
- Fault detection and exclusion
- Full disk encryption
- 1-Fluoro(18F)-1-deoxyephedrine
