= TMUC =

TMUC may refer to:

- The Miracle Ultraviolence Connection, an American professional wrestling tag team
- The Millennium Universal College, a college in Pakistan
