= Yadgar-e-Fatah =

War monument in Islamabad, Pakistan

- یادگارِ فتح
- Interactive map of Yadgar-e-Fatah
- Location: H-8, Islamabad, Pakistan
- Coordinates: 33°40′55″N 73°04′22″E
- Type: War monument
- Material: Mataf marble
- Length: 45.7 m (150 ft)
- Width: 24.4 m (80 ft)
- Height: 67.67 m (222 ft)
- Beginning date: December 2025
- Completion date: August 2026
- Opening date: 3 October 2026
- Dedicated date: 13 August 2026
- Dedicated to: Martyrs and victory in Marka-e-Haq
- Website: yadgarefatah.net
- Manager: Capital Development Authority

Yadgar-e-Fatah (یادگارِ فتح:Monument of Victory) is a national war monument in Sector H-8, Islamabad, Pakistan. Built of Mataf marble with a 222 ft (68 m) flagpole, it commemorates the martyrs and victory of the Pakistan Armed Forces in Marka-e-Haq. The monument was inaugurated on 13 August 2026 by President Asif Ali Zardari and Prime Minister Shehbaz Sharif, and opened to the public on 3 October 2026.

== Conception ==
Initiated by the Government of Pakistan and the armed forces to memorialize the sacrifices of fallen soldiers and highlight the collective solidarity of the state, military, and public during Marka-e-Haq.

== Design ==
Designed by Pakistani architects Arif Masood and Mahnoor Qureshi, with construction executed by the Frontier Works Organisation (FWO) under Project Director Colonel Abuzar Ghawas Khan Yousafzai. Conceptualized around Islamic architectural heritage, drawing directly from Al-Masjid an-Nabawi for its five grand arches and Masjid al-Haram for its white Thassos Mataf marble

- The Five Arches The Monument symbolizes the Iron Will of the Nation displayed during Operation Bunyan-um-Marsoos. The arches draw inspiration from the architecture of Masjid-e-Nabwi; embody the five pillars of Islam, representing the timeless dimension of Faith and Devotion. Together, they evoke the spiritual heritage of principles reflecting State and enduring values of the Nation.
- The Frieze 14 feet high Frieze is the crown jewel of the Monument at the top; artistically etched, representing the united stand of the Nation during Operation Bunyan-um-Marsoos.
- Mataf Marble The Thassos pristine marble used in the Monument is the same as of Mataf in Masjid al-Haram; brings exceptional purity and architectural elegance to the Yadgar.
- The Six Obelisks The six obelisks (3 on each side) transform the legacy of Marka-e-Haq into a vision of progress, prosperity and a promising future.
- An Iconic Landmark Across its 12-acre expanse, Yadgar-e-Fatah features Pakistan's first-ever 3D Architectural Projection Mapping System and a 222-feet high Pakistan flag defining the skyline of twin cities.

== See also ==
- Minar-e-Pakistan
