= Wesley Berry =

Wesley Berry may refer to:

- Wesley Berry (athlete), a champion competitor on the American television series American Gladiators from 1996 to 1996, and its British counterpart Gladiators in 1996
- Wesley Berry Flowers, an American floral and gift retailer
- Earl Wesley Berry (1959–2008), an American convicted kidnapper and murderer
