= H-8, Islamabad =

H-8 ایچ ۸
- Sector
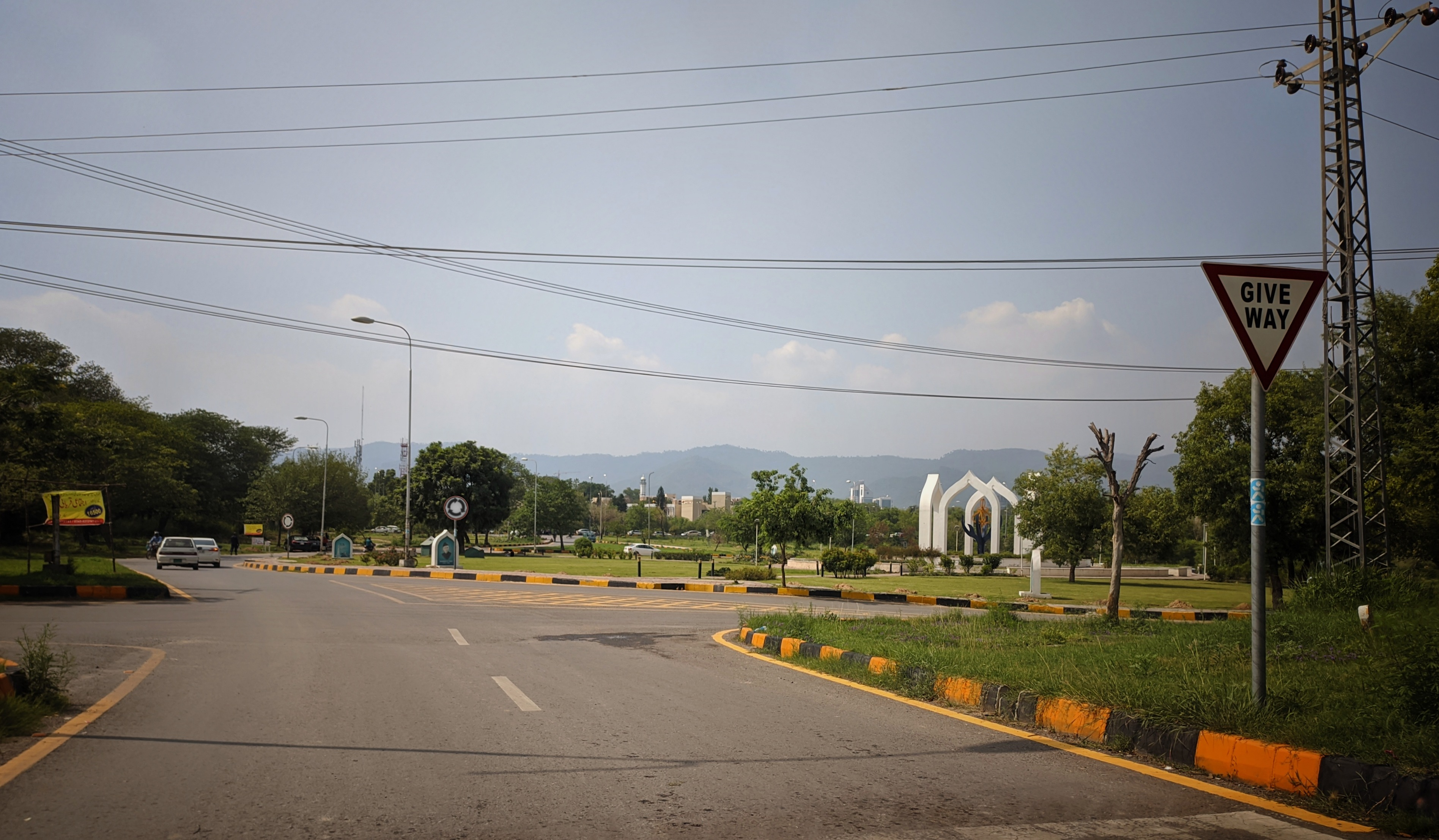
- Riphah Knowledge Park, H-8
- Interactive map of H-8
- Coordinates: 33.6826°N 73.0649°E
- Country: Pakistan
- Territory: Capital Territory
- Zone: I

Government
  - Body: Islamabad Metropolitan Corporation
- Postal Code: 44000

H-8 (Urdu: حلقہ ایچ ۸) is a sector of Islamabad. The sector is bounded by Srinagar Highway and G-8 to the north, Islamabad Expressway and Shakarparian to the east, I-8 to the south, and Ninth Avenue and H-9 to the west.

Similar to other H-sectors, H-8 is provided for education and health facilities.

== Subdivisions ==
H-8 is a square-shaped sector. It has been further divided into four sub-sectors:

- H-8/1
- H-8/2
- H-8/3 (H-8 Graveyard)
- H-8/4

== Services and facilities ==
=== Educational ===
The sector houses both public and private schools, colleges, and universities.

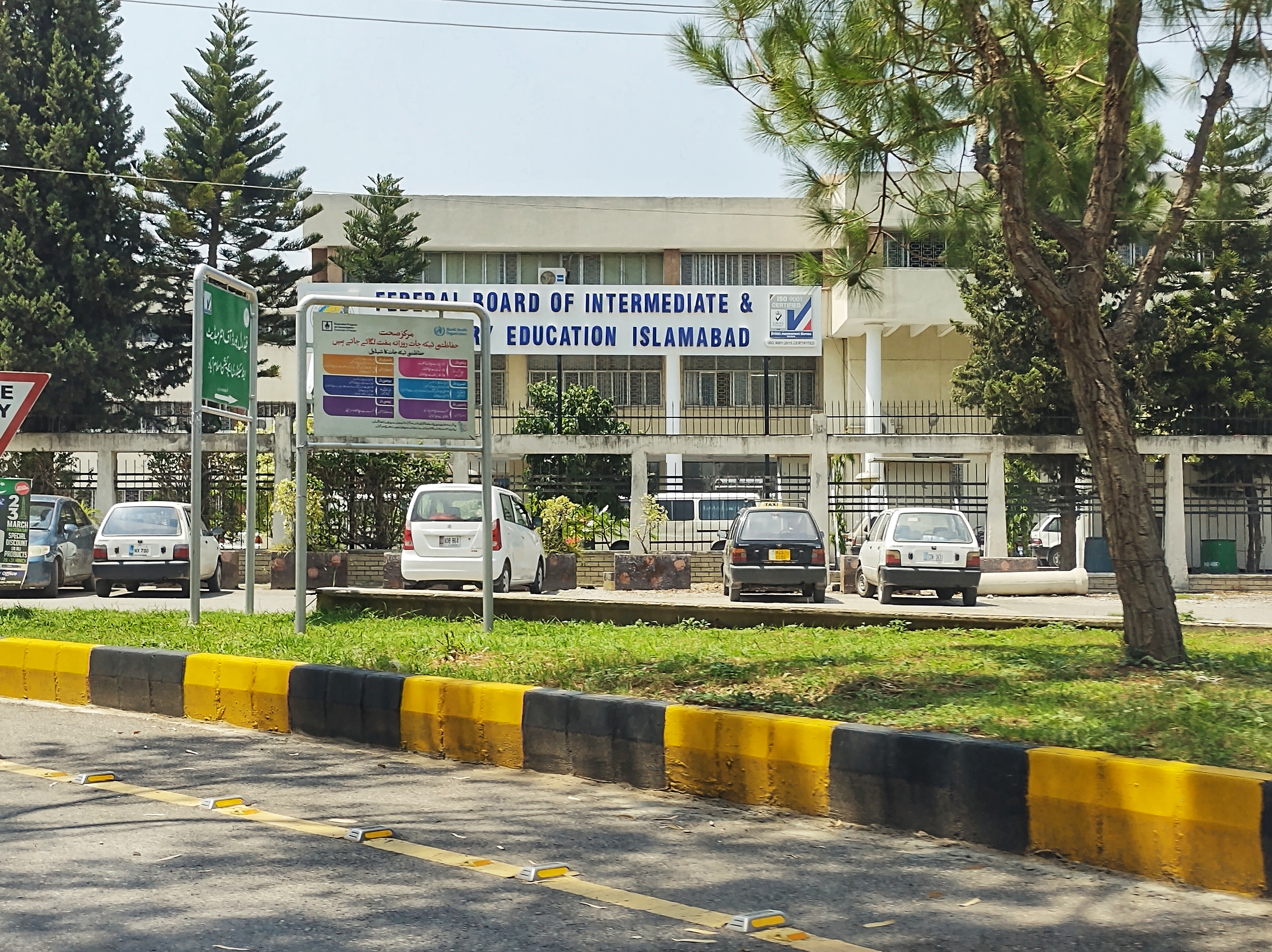
FBISE office in H-8/4, Islamabad

==== Board office ====
- Federal Board of Intermediate and Secondary Education (FBISE)

==== Special education ====
- National Institute of Special Education (NISE)
- Fatima Jinnah Special Education Centre
- Ibn-e-Sina Special Education Centre
- Vocational Rehabilitation & Employment of Disabled Persons

==== Schools and colleges ====
- Islamabad Convent School H-8/4 Campus
- City School Capital Campus
- Beaconhouse Margalla Campus
- Roots International Schools Wellington Campus and headoffice
- Sheikh Zayed International Academy
- OPF Boys school and college
- Westminster Academy H-8 Campus
- Joan McDonald School
- Pak-Turk Maarif International Schools & Colleges H-8 Campus
- LGS Islamabad Campus

==== Higher education and specialization institutes ====
- Polytechnical Institute for Women
- Survey Training Institute (Survey of Pakistan)
- WAPDA Staff Training College
- Women's Institute of Science & Humanities
- Federal Judicial Academy
- Shifa College of Medicine
- Islamabad Model Postgraduate College of Commerce
- Islamabad Model Postgraduate College, H-8 Islamabad.

==== Universities ====
- Allama Iqbal Open University
- SZABIST Islamabad Campus
- National Skills University
- Shifa Tameer-e-Millat University
- Preston University Islamabad Campus

=== Health ===
==== Hospitals ====
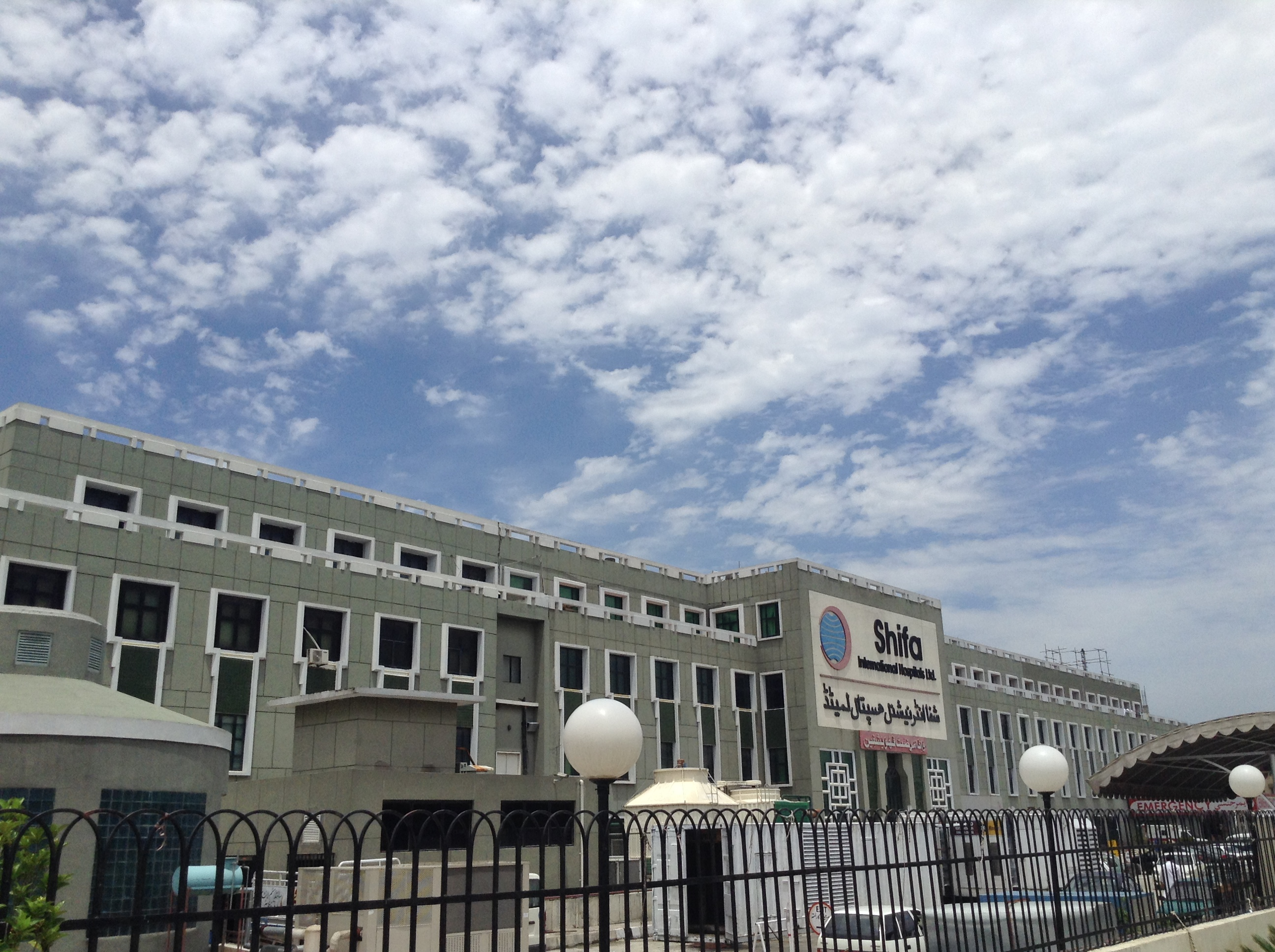
Shifa International Hospital in H-8/4, Islamabad

- Shifa International Hospital

==== Cemeteries ====
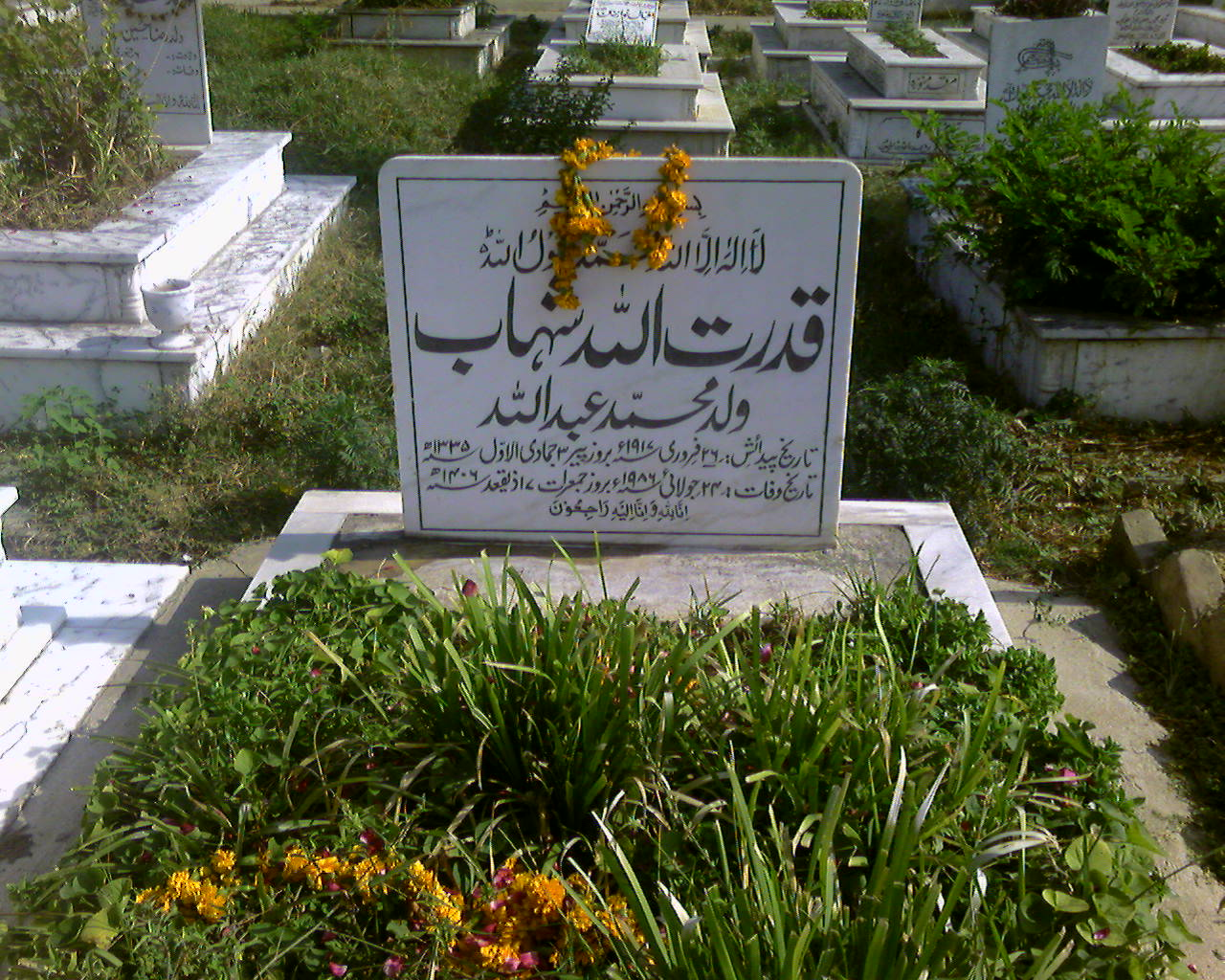
Resting place of Qudrat Ullah Shahab, an eminent Urdu writer and civil servant from Pakistan, at H-8 Graveyard of Islamabad.

- H-8 Graveyard

=== Religious ===
- Islamabad Capital Territory's only Bahá'í center is also located in this sector. Shoba Das of Minority Rights Group International reported in 2013 that there were around 200 Baha’is living in Islamabad.

== See also ==
- Sectors of Islamabad
- F-6, Islamabad
- F-8, Islamabad
- H-12, Islamabad
- I-10, Islamabad
