= Northwest College for Advanced Learning =

- Established: 2012
- Co-Founders: Mohit Jain, Maitreyi Singhvi and Tamhant Jain
- Location: Delhi NCR, Mumbai, and Bangalore, India
- Nickname: NW

Northwest Executive Education (Previously known as Northwest College for Advanced Learning) provides Executive Education in Leadership and Management in collaboration with universities like University of California, Los Angeles, University of California, Berkeley, University of London International Programmes and IE Business School, Madrid. Northwest is based out of India with locations in New Delhi, Mumbai and Bangalore. Mohit and Tamhant are Harvard Business School graduates and co-founders of Northwest.
