= Roots Millennium Schools =

Roots Millennium Schools ملینیم اسکولز

Information
- Type: Private
- Established: 1988
- Founder: Chaudhry Faisal Mushtaq
- Faculty: 2000
- Enrolment: 13000
- Average class size: 20-22
- Language: English-medium education
- Campuses: 35
- Affiliation: Edexcel, Cambridge International Examinations, Federal Board of Intermediate and Secondary Education, University of London International Programmes, China Radio International, World Wide Fund for Nature, Goethe-Institut
- Website: http://www.millenniumschools.edu.pk

Roots Millennium Schools is a part of Roots School System founded in 1988 by Mrs. Riffat Mushtaq. Roots Millennium Schools was established by her son Chaudhry Faisal Mushtaq and is operating campuses in 20 cities of Pakistan.

== History ==
Roots Millennium Schools is an ISO 9001:2008 certified educational institute.

== Accreditation & affiliation ==
Roots Millennium Schools Pakistan is a Cambridge International Examinations associated school, An edexcel International affiliated school, also an affiliate center of the University of London International Programmes United Kingdom, is a candidate school for International Baccalaureate IB Middle Years Programme, a Microsoft mentor status school 2014, a member of Goethe-Institut Pasch schools network. It was selected as one of the Arabia 500 fastest growing organizations in year 2012. Roots millennium schools is accredited with Inter Board Committee of Chairmen (IBCC Pakistan) and Higher Education Commission of Pakistan.

== See also ==
- Roots Ivy International University
