= Keerati Mahaplearkpong =

Thai actress (born 1987)

- คีรติ มหาพฤกษ์พงศ์
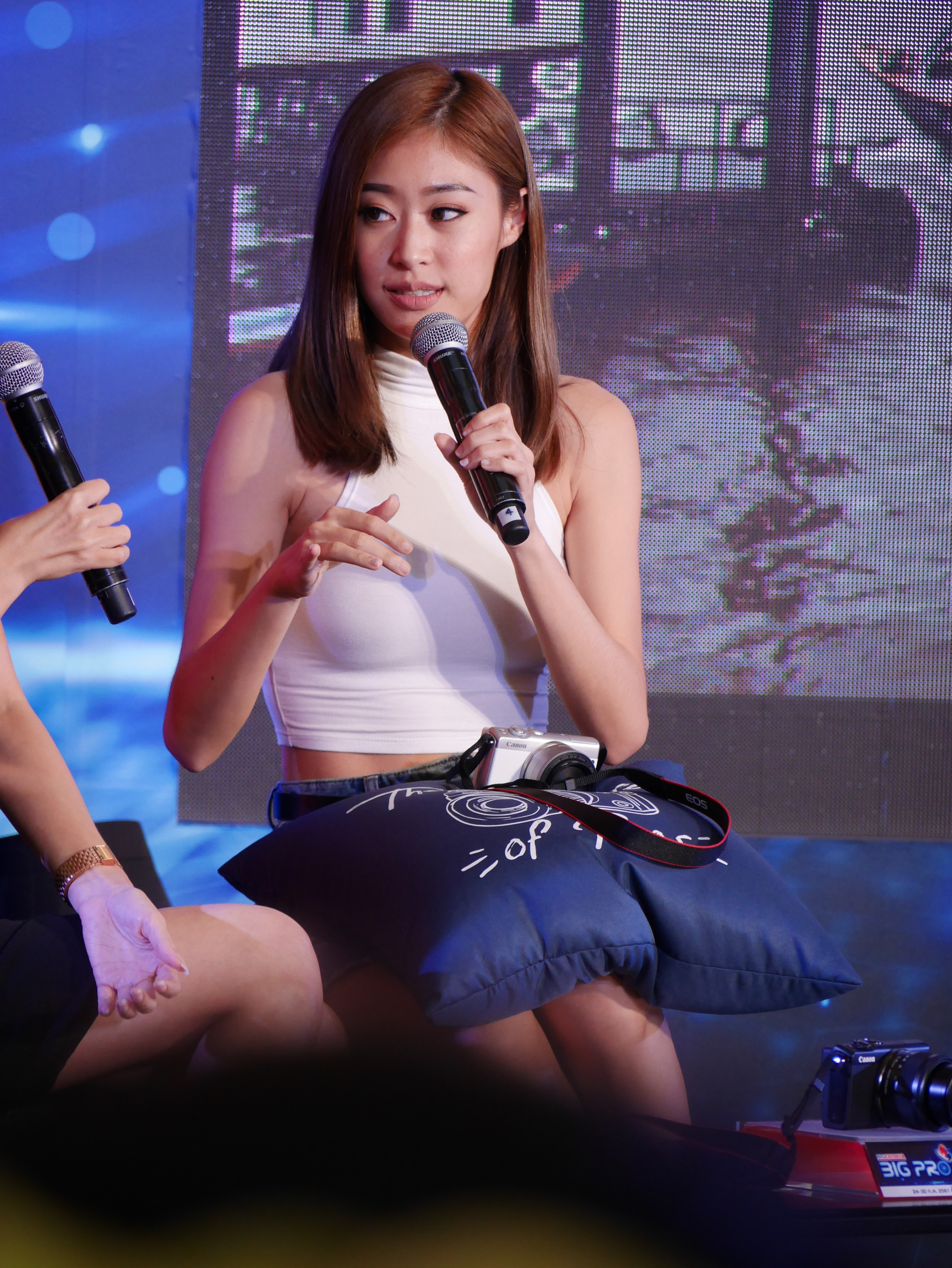
- Keerati during an interview
- Born: 12 August 1987 (age 38); Bangkok, Thailand
- Other name: Gypsy
- Occupations: Actress; singer; YouTuber
- Years active: 2007–present
- Relatives: Arikantha Mahaphruekpong (sister)

Keerati Mahaplearkpong (Thai: คีรติ มหาพฤกษ์พงศ์), nicknamed Gypsy, is a Thai actress and singer born on 12 August 1987 in Bangkok, Thailand). Her younger sister Arikantha Mahaphruekpong is also an actress.

== Works ==
=== Filmography ===
Year	Title	Role
2008	Bittersweet Boydpod The Short Film	Na
2009	The Kindergarten (อนุบาล เด็กโข่ง)	Om
2010	Sudkate Salateped (สุดเขตเสล็ดเป็ด)	Faen Khlap
2011	Bangkok Sweety (ส.ค.ส. สวีทตี้)	Ngaw
2012	Valentine Sweety (วาเลนไทน์ สวีทตี้)	Ngaw
2013	Love Syndrome (รักโง่ ๆ)	Cho

=== TV Drama ===
Year	Title	Role	Channel
2012	เจ้าแม่จำเป็น	Kalamae	Channel 5
2013	หัวใจเรือพ่วง	Ranthida	Channel 5
2013	จ้าวพายุ	Pinmani	Channel 5
2014	น่ารัก	Khing	Channel 5
2015	เคหาสน์ดาว	Saensen	One 31
2015	เล่ห์รตี	Phakini (Khun Pha)	One 31
2016	เพื่อเธอ	Muean Dao Thammapithak	One 31
2016	Sneha Kam Sen (เสน่หาข้ามเส้น)	Nicha	One 31
2017	ชายไม่จริงหญิงแท้	Aengchi (Angie)	One 31
2018	ทีมล่าทรชน	Muat If	GMM 25
2018	Oh My Ghost (OMG ผีป่วนชวนมารัก)	Khaopun	True4U
2019	ใบไม้ที่ปลิดปลิว	Manao	One 31
2020	เนตรมหรรณพ	Khristal (Crystal)	One 31
2023	หลงเงา	Nam	PPTV

=== Sitcoms/Series ===
Year	Title	Role	Channel
2010	รักล้นล้น 9 คน 4 คู่	ซี	Channel 9
2010	วงษ์คำเหลา เดอะซีรีส์	ปทุมรัตน์ (บัว)	Channel 9
2011	นัดกับนัด	ปอนด์	Channel 9
2013	ลูกพี่ลูกน้อง	ครีม	Channel 9
2013	ครอบครัวขำ	ยิปซี	Channel 3
2014	บ้านนี้มีรัก	แมว	Channel 9
2014	เพราะมีเธอ	ปลา	One 31
2016	รักฝุ่นตลบ	วีซ่า	One 31
2016	โสด Stories	พญ.มินธิรา อาภากุล (มายด์)	One 31
2017	ไม่เคยไตรภาค ตอน คำพูดที่หายไป	ณดา	GMM 25
2017	โสด Stories 2	พญ.มินธิรา อาภากุล (มายด์)	One 31
2019	Love Songs Love Series ก็เคยสัญญา	หมวย	GMM 25

=== Music videos ===
Music video
Song	Singer
Would U Mind ?	ยิปซี
คนดื้อดึง	ไนซ์ ทู มีท ยู
หนึ่งในคนใกล้ตัว	Forget Me Not
พิมพ์ไว้ในใจ	กัน นภัทร
กลัวความห่างไกล	โดม จารุวัฒน์ Ft. แก้ม วิชญาณี
รักได้คนเดียว	เตชินท์ ชยุติ
(อย่า)ให้ฉันเจอเธออีกที	รุจ ศุภรุจ
ฉันสบายใจ...ถ้าเธอสบายดี	ไอน้ำ
ผิดมากใช่ไหม	ยิปซี

=== Advertisements ===
- Kendo Biscuits
- Farmhouse Sliced Bread
- Sugus soft candy
- TrueMove H
- Brand's Veta Prune
- Sheene Oil Free Cake Powder
- Nokia smartphone 700
- Pepsi
- SEALECT canned tuna
