= Arikantha Mahaphruekpong =

Thai actress and host (born 1989)

Arikantha Mahapruekpong
- อริย์กันตา มหาพฤกษ์พงศ์
- Born: Ramita Mahapruekpong Thai: รมิตา มหาพฤกษ์พงศ์ 23 July 1989 (age 36); Bangkok, Thailand
- Other name: Gypso
- Occupations: Actress; singer; model; YouTuber; Plastic artist
- Years active: 2006–present
- Relatives: Keerati Mahaplearkpong (sister)

Arikantha Mahaphruekpong (Thai: อริย์กันตา มหาพฤกษ์พงศ์; born 23 July 1989), formerly Ramita Mahapruekpong (Thai: รมิตา มหาพฤกษ์พงศ์), nicknamed Gypso (Thai: ยิปโซ), is a Thai actress, model, plastic artist, and host. She is currently an undergraduate student at the University of London through its International Programmes. Her sister Keerati Mahaplearkpong is also an actress.

== Works ==
=== Filmography ===
| Years | Titles | Roles |
|---|---|---|
| 2009 | 32 Thun-wah (32 ธันวา) | Noon |
| 2010 | Rao Song Sam Khon (เราสองสามคน) | Ter |
| 2010 | Sudkate Salateped (สุดเขตเสลดเป็ด) | Mayom |
| 2011 | S.K.S. Sweety (ส.ค.ส. สวีทตี้) | Ngek |
| 2012 | Valentine Sweety (วาเลนไทน์ สวีทตี้) | Ngek |
| 2012 | Crazy Crying Lady (คุณนายโฮ) | schoolteacher (brief role) |
| 2013 | Fad Changto (ฟัดจังโตะ) | Kaep / Kaschang |
| 2015 | Watermelonhead Joe Online Detective (โจหัวแตงโม นักสืบออนไลน์) | Met Fa |
| 2016 | 11 12 13 Loving to Death (11 12 13 รักกันจะตาย) | Khaet |
| 2016 | I Love You Two (จำเนียรวิเวียนโตมร) | fake daughter |

=== TV Drama ===
| Year | Thai title | Title | Role | Network | Notes | With |
|---|---|---|---|---|---|---|
| 2017 | แหวนดอกไม้ | Flower Ring | Wanpech (Wan) | GMM 25 | | Puttichai Kasetsin |
| 2019 | ตกกระไดหัวใจพลอยโจน | Tok Kra Dai Hua Jai Ploy Jone | Kun Nai Roikaew Podjanaprakorn (Roikaew) | GMM 25 | | Arak Amornsupasiri |
| 2019 | รองเท้านารี | Rong Tao Naree | Ausana Srinakarim (Aun) | Amarin TV | | Thana Chatborirak |

=== TV Series ===
| Year | Thai title | Title | Role | Network | Notes | With |
|---|---|---|---|---|---|---|
| 2009 | เซน...สื่อรักสื่อวิญญาณ | | Duang (Young age) | 5HD1 | | |
| 2015 | แม่จ๋าอย่าหักโหม | | Mali | Workpoint TV | | Nat Kitjarit |
| 2015 | I Wanna Be Sup'Tar วันหนึ่งจะเป็นซุปตาร์ | I Wanna Be Suptar | Wannueng Junlapong (Wannueng) | GMM 25 | | Puttichai Kasetsin |
| 2015 | Club Friday The Series 6 ความรักไม่ผิด ตอน ผิดที่ไว้ใจ | | Aein | GMM 25 | | Toni Rakkaen |
| 2017 | Home Stay หนีรัก ไปพักใจ | | Run | GMM 25 | | Thana Sutikamon |

=== Hosts ===
| Year | Thai title | Title | Network | Notes | With |
|---|---|---|---|---|---|
| 2006–2009 | สตรอเบอรี่ชีสเค้ก | Strawberry Cheesecake | 3HD33 | | |
| 2011–2015 | | Sister Day | 5HD1; GMM 25 | | |
| 2011–2012 | ย้อนสยามผ่านฟิล์มจิ๋ว | | Thai PBS | | Tanthai Prasertkul |
| 2012–2015 | สาระแน | Saranair | Saranair Channel | | |
| 2017–present | อายุน้อยร้อยล้าน | | Workpoint TV; YouTube:Mushroom TV | | ก้อง-อรรฆรัตน์ นิติพน |
| 2021–present | ยิปย่อย | | YouTube:The gyps channel | | Keerati Mahapreukpong |

=== Magazine covers ===
- You and Me vol. 26 no. 595 October 2009
- Kazz vol. 2 no. 43 November 2009

=== Advertisements ===
- Rexona
- Calpis Lacto Soda
- Chevrolet Sonic Hatchback
