= University of London Worldwide =

Distance-learning institution of the University of London

Coordinates: 51.5211°N 0.1275°W

University of London
- Logo including the coat of arms
- Former names: University of London External System (1900 to 2010); University of London International Programmes/International Academy (2010 to 2018)
- Type: Public
- Established: 1858; 168 years ago
- Parent institution: University of London
- Chancellor: The Princess Royal (as Chancellor of the University of London)
- Vice-Chancellor: Wendy Thomson CBE
- Students: 40,675 (2018/19)
- Location: London, England
- Pro Vice-Chancellor and Chief Executive: Mary Stiasny, OBE
Colours
- Website: london.ac.uk

The University of London Worldwide (previously called the University of London International Academy) is the central academic body that manages external study programmes within the federal University of London. All courses are branded as simply "University of London", having previously been "University of London International Programmes" and earlier "University of London External Programmes". It claims to be the world's oldest distance and flexible learning body, established under the University of London's royal charter of 1858, although academics have disputed whether it offered distance learning at that time.

Several member institutions of the University of London offer degrees through the programme, including Birkbeck, Goldsmiths, King's College London, London School of Economics, London School of Hygiene & Tropical Medicine, Queen Mary, Royal Holloway, Royal Veterinary College, School of Oriental and African Studies and University College London.

The system offers courses of study for undergraduate and postgraduate diplomas and degrees to more than 50,000 students around the world. A designated member institution of the University of London acts as the lead institution for each course and is responsible for creating materials to allow students to study at their own pace. Examinations take place at testing centres around the world on specified dates. Hallmarks of the programme are its low cost in comparison to attendance in London, and the possibility of pursuing either full-time or part-time study. As stated in the University of London Statutes, International Programmes students are graded on the same standard as internal students to ensure a uniform credentialing process. A student who completes a course of study under the programme is awarded a University of London degree with a notation specifying which lead institution provided the instruction.

As of 2017, there are more than 100,000 University of London distance-learning alumni across the world, which include seven Nobel laureates, numerous presidents or prime ministers, current and former leaders of the Commonwealth of Nations, government ministers and Members of Parliament, academicians and notable judges. Currently, the global community of registered students number over 50,000 students in more than 180 countries including Antarctica.

== History ==
London's external system made it possible for a Colonial student to obtain some of the degrees of the University by examinations conducted entirely in his own Colony – A 1906 promotional pamphlet

The institution that later became known as University College London was established in 1826 and opened in 1828 under the name "London University", although without official recognition of university status. The institution – following the Scottish model in curriculum and teaching – was non-denominational and, given the intense religious rivalries at the time, there was an outcry against the "godless" university. The issue soon boiled down to which institutions had degree-granting powers and which institutions did not. The compromise solution that emerged in 1836 was that the sole authority to conduct the examinations leading to degrees would be given to a new officially recognised entity called the "University of London", which would act as examining body for the University of London colleges, originally University College London and King's College London, and award their students University of London degrees. As Sheldon Rothblatt states, "thus arose in nearly archetypal form the famous English distinction between teaching and examining, here embodied in separate institutions." With the state giving examining powers to a separate entity, the groundwork was laid for the creation of a programme within the new university that would both administer examinations and award qualifications to students taking instruction at another institution or pursuing a course of self-directed study.

=== People's University and larger role ===
University of London External System official logo from year 2007 to 2010

We do further will and ordain, That persons not educated in any of the said Institutions connected with the said University shall be admitted as Candidates for Matriculation, and for any of the Degrees hereby authorized to be conferred by the said University of London other than Medical Degrees, on such conditions as the said Chancellor, Vice-Chancellor and Fellows, by regulations in that behalf shall from time to time determine, such Regulations being subject to the Provisoes and Restrictions herein contained. – Clause 36 of the 1858 charter of the University of London

The 1858 charter of the University of London allowed students at any college, whether affiliated or not, self-taught students, students with private tutors and students taking correspondence courses to sit University of London exams on payment of the £5 fee. On this basis, the University of London has claimed to be the first university to offer distance learning degrees, although its role at that time was limited to that of an examining board. Thanapal (2015) states that "the original degree by external study of the UOL was not a form of distance education".

In 1858, a British weekly literary magazine named All the Year Round, founded and owned by Charles Dickens, coined the term "The People's University" or "The English People's University", to describe the University of London as it provided access to higher education to students from less affluent backgrounds.

Several current degree-awarding universities started as colleges presenting candidates for University of London degrees, such as Owens College which later became part of the Victoria University and eventually the University of Manchester. The external system continued to expand from its London base with examinations for non-collegiate students held in Gibraltar (1867), Canada (1868), Tasmania and West Indies (1869), India (1880), Ceylon (1882), Hong Kong (1888), with 18 centres worldwide by 1899.

With the reform of the University of London from an examining board to a federal university in 1900, the existing examination system became the External System, with the newly federated colleges in London forming the Internal System (with the university taking responsibility for approving courses and teachers). Both external and internal students continued to be awarded the same University of London degrees.

The University of London examination system and the External System were instrumental in the formation of British higher education. Most English and Welsh university colleges founded between 1849 and 1949 (exceptions include Newcastle, linked with Durham from its foundation in 1871, and Swansea, part of the University of Wales from its foundation in 1920) served what was a form of "apprenticeship" through offering London degrees by external study for a period (which could vary considerably in length), before receiving authorisation to award their own degrees and becoming universities in their own right. The External System also played a significant role in establishing many Commonwealth universities under a unique scheme of "special relations".

Enrolment increased steadily in the late 19th and early 20th centuries, and during the Second World War there was a further increase in enrolments from soldiers stationed abroad as well as soldiers imprisoned in German POW camps. Because the Geneva Convention (1929) stipulated that every prisoner of war, in addition to being entitled to adequate food and medical care, had the right to exchange correspondence and receive parcels, many British POWs took advantage of this opportunity and enrolled in the University of London External Programme. The soldiers were sent study materials by mail, and at specified intervals sat for proctored exams in the camps. Almost 11,000 exams were taken at 88 camps between 1940 and 1945. Though the failure rate was high, substantial numbers of soldiers earned degrees while imprisoned.

However, as more universities were established in Britain and the Commonwealth in the decades following the second world war, the demand for the external system dropped. In 1972 it was announced that the external system would stop registering students at public institutions from 1977, and in 1977 overseas registrations were also stopped, although these were reopened in 1982.

In 1985–6, there were 24,500 students registered for external degrees in six main subject areas. Law was by far the biggest subject, with 75 percent of all enrollments. In 1985, there were 358 LLBs awarded to internal students; in the same year, 298 graduated with external LLBs. Reform of the external system in 1987 saw colleges contracted (either individually or, as in the case of Law, as a consortium) by the university to provide academic support for external students. This established the concept of the "lead college" on a course, and led to programme directors in the lead colleges taking on not just examinations but also the delivery of the courses and, in collaboration with academics in the colleges, the development of teaching materials

University of London International Programmes official logo from year 2010 to 2018.

The University of London International Programmes commemorated its 150th anniversary in 2008. A specially commissioned anniversary book was produced to mark the occasion.

=== Research programmes and degrees ===
With the advent of inexpensive airmail services after the war, the number of external students taking University of London courses increased dramatically. According to relevant Regulations, until 2000 University of London external students could pursue research leading to the award of Master of Philosophy (MPhil) or Doctor of Philosophy (PhD) albeit the completion rate had been rather low.

== Organisation and administration ==
University of London Worldwide is led by an executive director.

== Current system ==
The University of London chancellor, The Princess Royal, presiding over the External Programme Presentation Ceremony, 2006

The system offers courses of study for undergraduate and postgraduate diplomas and degrees to more than 50,000 students around the world. A designated constituent institution of the University of London, called the "lead college", creates materials to allow students to study at their own pace. Unlike many modern distance learning degrees that are based on coursework alone, assessment was primarily based on examinations that take place at testing centres around the world on specified dates. Since 2019, coursework and forum participation can make up a percentage of the overall assessment in addition to in-person or online examinations, depending on the degree and modules studied. Hallmarks of the programme are its low cost in comparison to attendance in London, and the possibility of pursuing either full-time or part-time study. As stated in the University of London Statutes, International Programmes students are graded on the same standard as internal students to ensure a uniform credentialing process. A student who completes a course of study under the program is awarded a University of London degree with a notation specifying which lead college provided the instruction.

Students enrolled in the University of London International Programmes are members of the University of London. International Programmes Students however, have very limited student representation within the university. There are also differences over the status International Programmes Students have with respect to their lead college. Some institutions co-register their International Programmes Students as college members (e.g. SOAS, LSHTM), in addition to their status as University of London member. However, other colleges deny International Programmes Students membership status and privileges when they are present in London (e.g. LSE). Academics at the University of London are responsible for the academic direction of the International Programmes. When the International Programmes was audited in 2005 by the Quality Assurance Agency (QAA), the auditors concluded that 'broad confidence' could be placed in the university's management and the awards made through the External System ('broad confidence' is "the best verdict any institution can be given by the auditors"). The 'confidence' was once again reiterated in the QAA's 2011 Institutional Audit, attesting to the quality of the program provision.

Most International Programmes Students are in former territories of the British Empire. There are more than 9,000 students enrolled in the programme in Singapore notably the SIM Global Education, 5,000 in Hong Kong, 3,000 in Trinidad and Tobago, 2,000 in Malaysia, 1,900 in Pakistan, 1,200 in Bangladesh, 800 in Sri Lanka, 1,000 in Canada, between 1,000 and 1,999 in the United States, 300 in Malta, more than 200 in Australia, more than 200 in South Africa, more than 30 in New Zealand and many hundreds in India, among other countries. Furthermore, there are around 1,000 students in Russia participating in this programme.

=== Name changes ===
In November 2007, the University of London External Programme became known as the University of London External System. In August 2010, the name was once again changed to University of London International Programmes in response to feedback that the programme needed a clear, simpler and more inclusive name that described what the University of London offered to almost 50,000 students in 180 countries.

As from February 2018, University of London International Programmes changed its name to just University of London. The logo has been also changed to University of London, instead having its own logo.

=== Participating colleges and institutes of the University of London ===
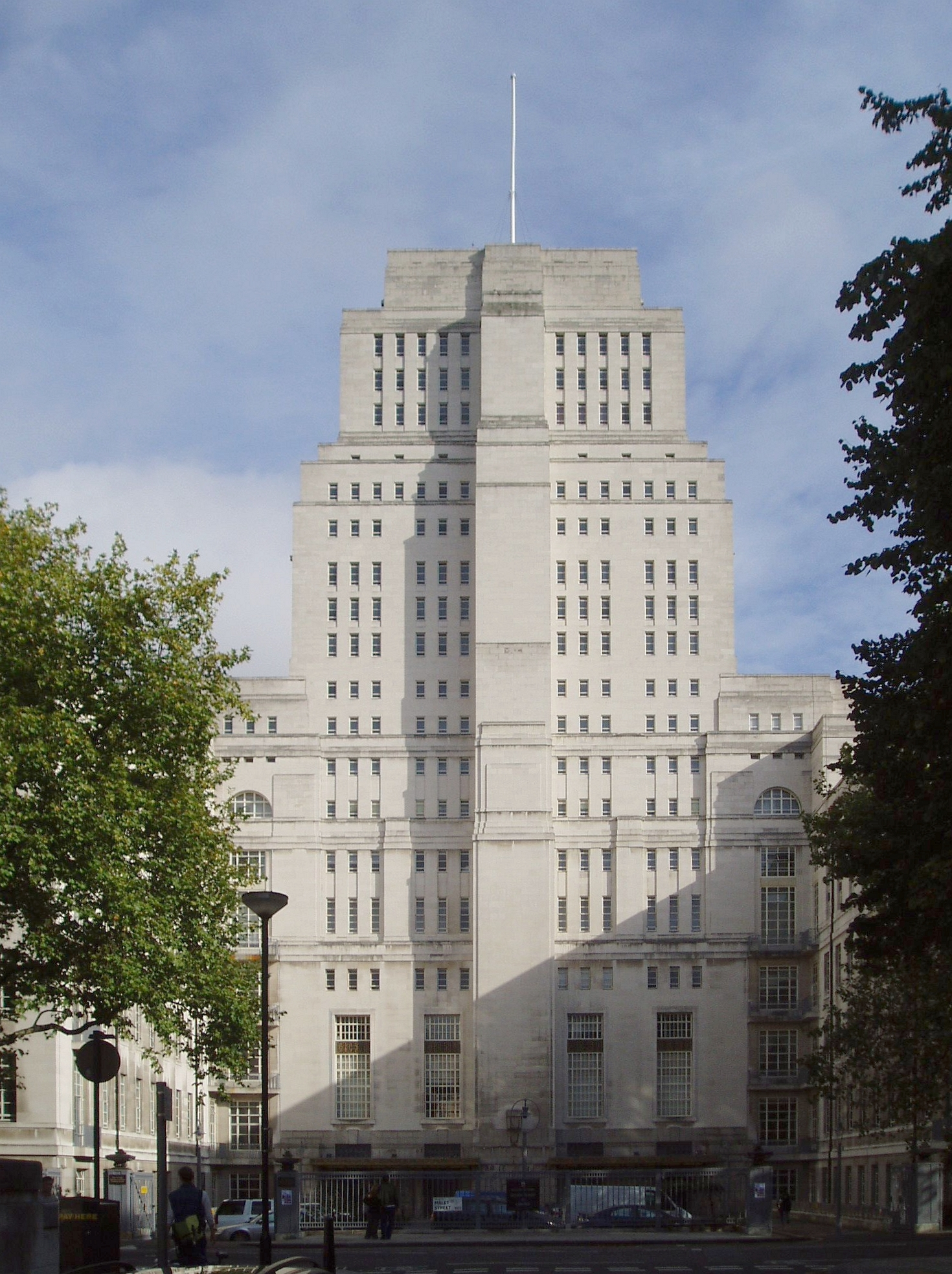
Senate House, University of London

- Birkbeck
- Goldsmiths
- UCL Institute of Education
- King's College London
- London School of Economics
- London School of Hygiene & Tropical Medicine
- Queen Mary
- Royal Holloway
- Royal Veterinary College
- School of Oriental and African Studies
- University College London

After Imperial College London left the university in July 2007, the School of Oriental and African Studies became the lead college for the external degrees previously led by Imperial.. Following the closure of Heythrop College in January 2019, academic direction on distance learning courses in divinity is provided by the University of London rather than by one of the colleges.

=== Independent teaching institutions ===
In Europe, North America, the Middle East, South Asia and East Asia many students participating in University of London International Programmes seek out tuition at one of the more than 150 private or non-profit institutions that prepare students for University of London examinations. Such institutions may be audited and, if found to meet quality standards, may become "recognised" by the university for the support offered.

Starting August 2010, the External System programmes were renamed University of London International Programmes. The central academic body of the university, collaborating with the colleges of the University of London, is renamed University of London International Academy, term mainly used internally.

In parallel to this change, the teaching institutions are now categorized into Registered and Affiliate centers (collectively known as recognised centres). Students can either decide to study entirely by themselves, or to enjoy the administrative and academic support of the institutions that are recognised by the University of London for the International Programmes. Registered Centres have demonstrated commitment to developing high standards in respect of teaching, support to students and administrative processes. Affiliate Centres have demonstrated a sustained commitment to developing excellence in respect of quality of teaching, support to students and administrative processes. Affiliate Centre status is the highest level of recognition awarded by the University of London. Recognition applies to specific programmes on named campuses. New College of the Humanities, a private college founded in London in 2011, though not affiliated with the University of London, also plans to register its students for degrees through the programme.

== Academic profile ==
=== Programmes and degrees ===
University of London currently offers 31 undergraduate degrees and 38 postgraduate degrees and also several diplomas. All degrees are created, monitored and examined by the colleges of the University of London.

In 2019, the University of London Worldwide and the LSE announced a partnership with 2U to deliver a fully online bachelor's degree in data science and business analytics through 2U's online platform.

=== Scholarships and financial support ===
In 2020, József Váradi donated £1 million to the university for support of external scholarship and aid. Organisations such as Commonwealth Scholarships, Sir John Cass's Foundation scholarship and individual scholarship like Guy Goodwin-Gill scholarship, Sadako Ogata scholarships are available for external students.

== Influence ==
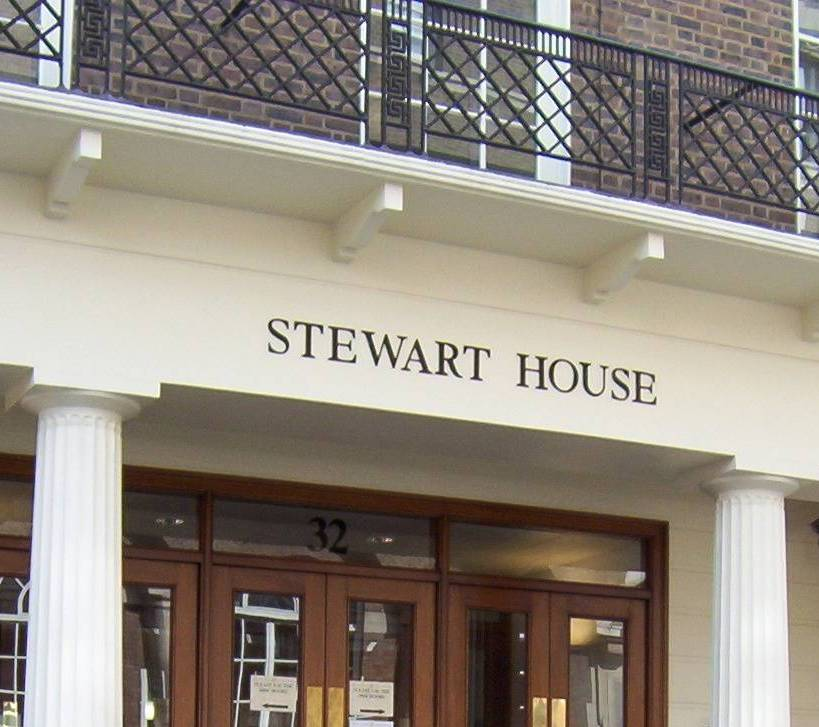
International Programmes Administrative Building, Stewart House, University of London

The University of London external system has played an important role in the development of higher education institutions in Britain. Many leading research universities in England started out as "university colleges" that prepared students for external degrees of the University of London. Some technical colleges in England and Scotland also entered students for University of London degrees and certificates prior to becoming polytechnics or central institutions and then universities. Examples include the University of Exeter, the University of Leicester, the University of Nottingham and Portsmouth University in England, Bangor University and Cardiff University in Wales (prior to the establishment of the University of Wales) and Robert Gordon University in Scotland.

This was a common way of establishing new universities in Britain and around the British Empire during the first half of the twentieth century. Many universities in the Commonwealth began as extension institutions or a provider of the programme. Notable examples include Ceylon University College in Ceylon, University College Ibadan (now the University of Ibadan) in Nigeria, the former University of East Africa's three constituent institutions and the University of the West Indies in the Caribbean.

== Online MOOCs ==
In 2012, University of London International Programmes became the first British higher education institution to join Coursera and offer mass open online courses through their platform. By 2016, total enrollments had crossed 1 million. In 2018 the University of London, its member institution Goldsmiths, University of London, and Coursera announced they were collaborating to offer the first undergraduate Computer Science degree on the platform.

== Notable alumni ==
The degree graduates from the International Programmes are member of the University of London International Programmes Alumni Association and formal alumni of the University of London.

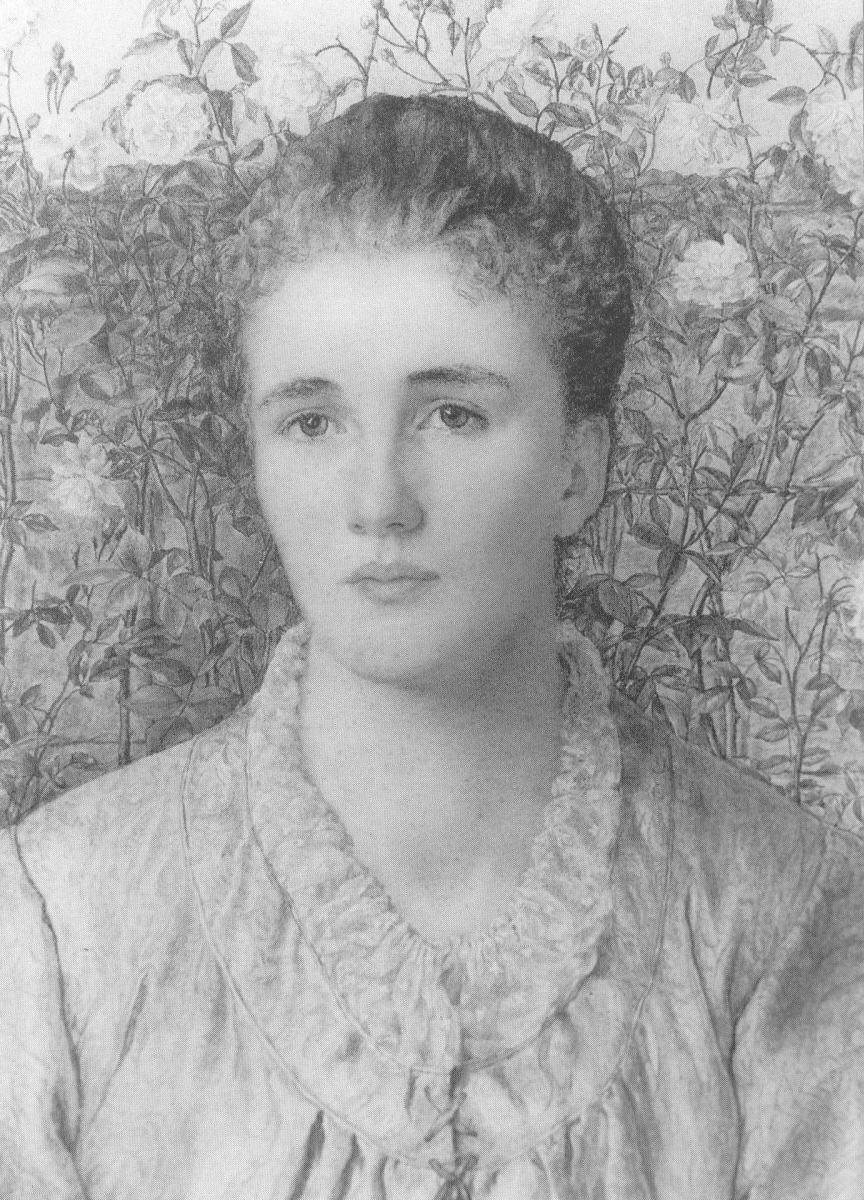
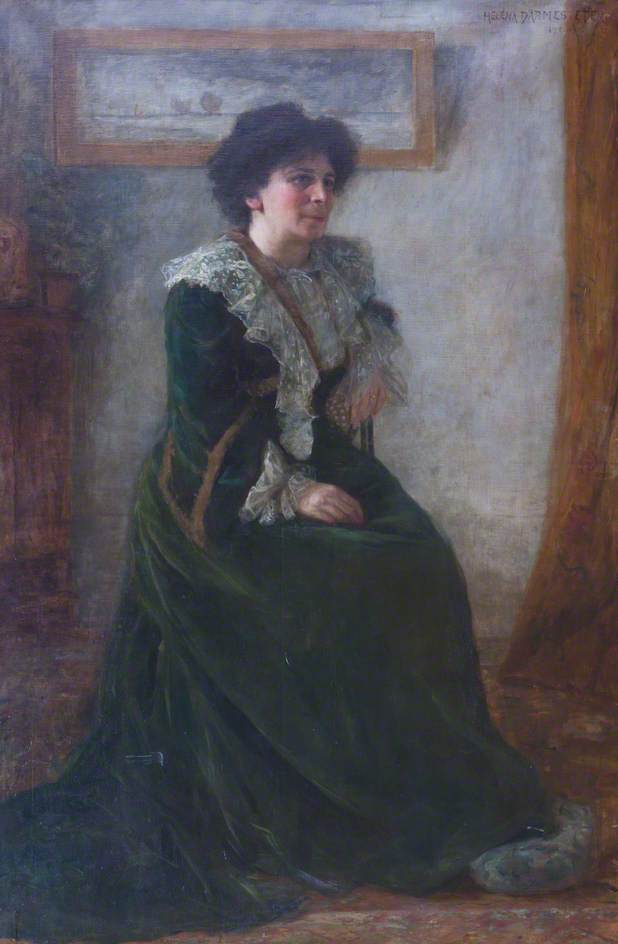
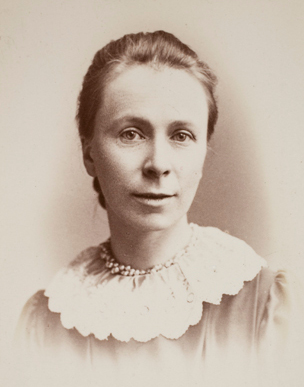
Louise Creighton, Hertha Ayrton and Sophie Bryant were among the first women to graduate as external degree candidate students after being permitted to sit "special examinations" at the University of London.

=== Nobel laureates ===
At least seven Nobel Prizes have been awarded to alumni of the University of London distance learning students in external mode:

- Ronald H. Coase (Economic Sciences, 1991)
- Frederick Gowland Hopkins (Physiology or Medicine, 1929)
- Charles K. Kao (Physics, 2009)
- Nelson Mandela (Peace, 1993)
- Rolph Payet, Lead author of IPCC (Peace, 2007); HonDSc (2016)
- Wole Soyinka (Literature, 1986)
- Derek Walcott (Literature, 1992)

=== Presidents, prime ministers, politicians ===
- Emeka Anyaoku, 3rd Secretary-General of the Commonwealth of Nations
- Luisa Diogo, 3rd Prime Minister of Mozambique
- Sir Oliver Goonetilleke, 3rd Governor-General of Ceylon
- Sir Senerat Gunewardene, cabinet minister and diplomat
- Varun Gandhi, Member of Parliament, Lok Sabha from India
- Alvan Ikoku, Nigerian politician
- J. R. Jayewardene, 2nd President of Sri Lanka and 7th Prime Minister of Sri Lanka
- Charles Muguta Kajege, Member of Parliament, Tanzania
- David Knox, former Member of Parliament for Leek, Staffordshire
- W. J. M. Lokubandara, Member of Parliament in Sri Lanka United National Party
- Eleni Mavrou, Minister of Interior of the Republic of Cyprus
- Thabo Mbeki, 2nd President of South Africa
- Dipu Moni, 1st woman to become Foreign Minister of Bangladesh
- Fred Mulley, UK Secretary of State for Defence
- Robert Mugabe, 2nd President of Zimbabwe and 1st Prime Minister of Zimbabwe
- Paul Pearce, Member of Parliament, Australia
- A. N. R. Robinson, 3rd President of Trinidad and Tobago and 3rd Prime Minister of Trinidad and Tobago
- Patricia Scotland, 6th Secretary-General of the Commonwealth of Nations
- Gisela Stuart, Member of Parliament for Birmingham Edgbaston
- Maria Tam, Deputy of Hong Kong to National People's Congress

=== Military, civil servants and diplomats ===
- Hamilton Amerasinghe, 31st President of the United Nations General Assembly (1976)
- Teresa Cheng, 4th Secretary for Justice of Hong Kong
- Leung Chin-man, Permanent Secretary in the Government of Hong Kong
- Thomas Kelly-Kenny, General of the British Army
- Stephen Lam, Chief Secretary for Administration of Hong Kong
- Gunapala Malalasekera, Permanent Representative of Sri Lanka to the United Nations and Ambassador
- Bernard Peiris, Cabinet Secretary of Sri Lanka
- Ediriweera Sarachchandra, Ambassador of Sri Lanka to France
- Li Tieh-tseng, Ambassador of Republic of China to Iran and Thailand
- T. K. Whitaker, Governor of the Central Bank of Ireland and Senator of Seanad Éireann

=== Judges and lawyers ===
- Bola Ajibola, Judge of the International Court of Justice
- Oswald Leslie De Kretser III, judge of the Supreme Court of Ceylon
- Helena Normanton, First female barrister in the United Kingdom.
- Agha Rafiq Ahmed Khan, Former Chief Justice of the Federal Shariat Court of Pakistan
- Babatunji Olowofoyeku, Attorney General of Western Region, Nigeria
- Meir Shamgar, former President/Chief Justice of the Israeli Supreme Court
- Choor Singh, Judge of the Supreme Court of Singapore
- Frederic N. Smalkin, former Chief Judge of the United States District Court for the District of Maryland,
- Victor Tennekoon, 35th Chief Justice of Sri Lanka
- Henry Thambiah, Judge of the Supreme Court of Ceylon
- Christopher Weeramantry, Judge and Vice-President of the International Court of Justice
- Edward Williams, Judge of the Supreme Court of Queensland, Australia

=== Business ===
- Joseph Hotung, 1st Chairman of Hong Kong Arts Development Council and Recipient of Knight Bachelor
- Khadija Mushtaq, executive director of Roots School System, Pakistan
- Sherin Naiken, CEO of Seychelles Tourism Board

=== Scientists and academics ===
- Donald Harris, Professor emeritus at Stanford University and father of Kamala Harris
- Chinua Achebe, David and Marianna Fisher University Professor at Brown University.
- Grace Alele-Williams, Chancellor of University of Benin
- Asa Briggs, Chancellor of Open University (1978 to 1994)
- Brian Laurence Burtt, English botanist
- Bob Coats – former professor at University of York
- Glyn Davies, economist
- Patrick du Val, inventor of the concept of Du Val singularity in algebraic surface
- Geoffrey Elton, Regius Professor of History at University of Cambridge
- Sir Roy Goode, Founder of Centre for Commercial Law Studies at Queen Mary, University of London.
- A.C. Grayling, Master of the New College of the Humanities
- Alec Issigonis, engineer and designer of the British Motor Corporation (BMC) Mini
- Harold Jeffreys, mathematician, statistician, geophysicist and astronomer
- Israel Kirzner, former professor of economics at New York University
- Kelvin Lancaster, former professor of economics at Columbia University
- D H Lawrence, British author and critic
- Ronald Piper, Professor and Vice-Principal at the University of St Andrews
- Charlotte Scott, former professor of mathematics at Bryn Mawr College
- Charles P. Snow, Rector of the University of St Andrews (1961 to 1964)
- L. Dudley Stamp, Professor at the London School of Economics and Political Science
- Barnes Wallis, Inventor of the Bouncing Bomb
- Alan Walters, former Chief Economic Adviser to Prime Minister Margaret Thatcher

=== Religion ===
- Louis Charles Casartelli, fourth Bishop of Salford
- Thomas Cooray, Cardinal of the Roman Catholic Church
- Walpola Rahula Thero, Sri Lankan Buddhist monk, scholar and writer

=== Others ===
- Adewale Akinnuoye-Agbaje, actor
- Ulli Beier, writer
- Malcolm Bradbury, British author and academic
- Jim Crace, English novelist
- Louise Creighton, British author and activist
- Nigel de Gruchy, former trade union official
- Jack Higgins, English novelist
- Ramita Mahapreukpong, Thai actress
- David Forbes Martyn, physicist
- C. P. Snow, English physicist and novelist
- Josiah Stamp, 1st Baron Stamp, economist and former Director of the Bank of England
- Gordon Taylor, former professional footballer and current chief executive of the Professional Footballers' Association
- Barbara Thiering, Australian writer and historian
- H. G. Wells, writer
- Kwasi Wiredu, philosopher
- Frances Yates, historian

== Notable faculty ==
- T. S. Eliot

== See also ==
- List of first women lawyers and judges by nationality
