= Women's Institute of Science & Humanities =

Universities and colleges in Islamabad

Women's Institute of Science and Humanities
- Motto: Progressive in Vision, Islamic in Ethos, Global in Character
- Type: Private
- Affiliations: HEC, Riphah International University
- President: Prof. Tayyeb Gulzar Khan
- Undergraduates: 300
- Location: Islamabad, Pakistan
- Website: www.wish.edu.pk

Women's Institute of Science and Humanities (WISH) is an institute of higher learning for women in H-8, Islamabad, Pakistan.

== History ==
Established in 2003 in the city of Islamabad, it caters to students from Pakistan and abroad. WISH is affiliated with Riphah International University.

The idea of an institution of higher learning for women was conceived in the mid-1990s. The capital to construct the campus came from Muslims living in North America and Europe. 2.5 acres (10,000 m^{2}) of land was acquired in Islamabad and the first building was ready for occupancy by 2002. WISH opened its doors for admission in autumn 2003.

During its first year of operation, it offered admissions to women in the fields of education, computer science and Islamic studies. Since then departments and programs have been added.

A number of educationists have been affiliated with the institution from its inception. These include Prof. Tayyeb Gulzar Khan (president), Dr. Anis Ahmad (vice chancellor of Riphah International University), Dr. Inamur Rahman (founder and professor emeritus of PIEAS), Prof. Kazi Zulkader Siddiqui (first head of the Department of Islamic Studies at WISH), Dr. Khalid Alavi (scholar of Islamic Studies), Dr. Ilyas Ahmad (educationist), Dr. M. A. Qazi (director) and Dr. Zahid Hussain (head of the Department of Science Education), Dr. Mustafeez Alvi (Head of the Department of Islamic Studies).

== Programs ==
WISH offers bachelor's and master's degree programs in the following disciplines:

- Education (science and arts)
- Basic sciences
- Computer science
- Commerce
- Business administration
- Islamic studies
- Languages and literature
- Arts and the humanities

== Student facilities ==
=== Library ===
The library provides research facilities to the students, housing 10,000 hardbound volumes, 90,000 volumes in digital format, over 18,000 full text journals, nearly 10 million articles and 6 million reference resources.

=== Language Laboratory ===
WISH has a language laboratory to facilitate learning of English and other languages.

=== Computer laboratories and internet ===
All students have access to computer laboratory facilities. Girls who are in Social Sciences. Internet access is provided to the students.

=== Hostels ===
WISH has a dormitory to house over 100 women. It has a dining facility. The students living on-campus have a shop to buy articles of daily need. An automated self-help laundry facility is available.

=== Sports and extracurricular activities ===
The institute provides facilities for games and co-curricular activities. The students participate in inter-departmental games and competitions organized by the Riphah International University and other civic agencies in the city of Islamabad. Students also participate in debates, declamation contests, quizzes and seminars organized by the institute or student bodies.

=== Financial assistance ===
WISH offers financial assistance to nearly 40% of the women who are studying at the institution. This assistance is offered on the basis of need and merit.

== Student activities ==
=== Student government ===
To maintain discipline and facilitate students to solve their problems, WISH has a system of student proctors. The hierarchy comprises class representatives, proctors from each department, and a senior proctor. The chief proctor is normally a senior teacher.

=== Intellectual forum ===
An intellectual forum has been established to organize intellectual activities for WISH students, teachers and people from other walks of life. Scholar and educationist Dr. Khalid Alavi is its president. Some of the key speakers invited to sessions of the forum included Farhat Mazari (former political advisor to the prime minister), Muhammad Khan Minhas, Dr. Omer Bajwa from USA, Dr. Zafar Ishaq Ansari (director general of the Islamic Research Institute, IIUI), Sohail Umer (director Iqbal Academy Lahore), and Dr. Anis Ahmad (vice chancellor, Riphah International University).
