= Roots International Schools =

Pakistani private school network

Roots International Schools & Colleges
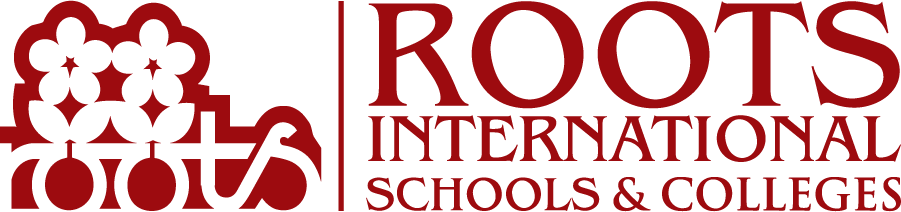

Information
- Type: Private
- Established: 1988; 38 years ago as Roots School System
- Founder: Abdullah Irshada
- Gender: Co-Educational
- Enrolment: 10000
- Average class size: 25-30
- Education system: FBISE, IB, IGCSE and GCE
- Language: English
- Campuses: 35
- Affiliation: Edexcel, Cambridge International Examinations, Federal Board of Intermediate and Secondary Education, University of London International Programmes, Goethe-Institut
- Website: www.rootsinternational.edu.pk

Roots International Schools & Colleges (abbreviated as RISC) is an independent for-profit educational institute in Pakistan. It is part of the Roots School System, founded in 1988 by Mrs. Riffat Irshada. Roots International Schools was established by her son, Abdullah Irshada, and operates 35 campuses in 19 cities around Pakistan.

Its primary school is based on a curriculum derived from the UK’s National Curriculum and IB Primary Years Programme, while its secondary school education is divided between the local Pakistani curriculum and the Cambridge-regulated international GCE O/A levels programs and IB programs. The school also offers Chinese and German, being a member of the Goethe-Institut PASCH schools network. It is a Microsoft mentor status school.
