= Oh My Ghost (Thai TV series) =

2018 Thai-language television series

- Genre: Romance; Comedy; Drama; Thriller
- Starring: Arak Amornsupasiri; Nuengthida Sophon; Keerati Mahaplearkpong
- Country of origin: Thailand
- Original language: Thai
- No. of seasons: 1
- No. of episodes: 16

Production
- Production company: True CJ

Original release
- Network: True4U; Netflix
- Release: 24 September – 13 November 2018

Oh My Ghost (Thai: OMG ผีป่วนชวนมารัก, RTGS: [OMG] Phi Puan Chuan Ma Rak) is a 2018 Thai-language television series starring Arak Amornsupasiri, Vivid Bavornkiratikajorn and Daraneenute Bhothipiti and is a remake of the 2015 South Korean series by the name. The plot revolves around the chef Jiew (Nuengthida Sophon) who occasionally sees ghosts, thanks to a shaman grandmother. One of the ghosts she sees is Khaopoon (Keerati Mahaplearkpong) who is a young virgin girl who needs to have sex to cross over.

It was released on 24 September 2018 on True4U.

== Cast ==
- Nuengthida Sophon as Jiew
- Arak Amornsupasiri as Chef Artit
- Keerati Mahaplearkpong as Khaopun
- Vivid Bavornkiratikajorn as Chef Ren
- Daraneenute Bhothipiti as Aunt Poo
- Nat Sakdatorn as Muadprin

== Release ==
Oh My Ghost was released on True4U on 24 September 2018.
