= Islamabad College for Boys =

Graduate college

Islamabad College for Boys, G-6/3, Islamabad
- اسلام آباد کالج برائے طلباء
- Emblem of institution
- Former name: Islamabad Model School
- Motto: لَا یَمُوْتُ مَنْ اَحْیَ الْعِلْم
- Motto in English: 'He dieth not who giveth life to learning'
- Type: Public
- Established: 1966; 60 years ago
- Academic affiliations: Federal Board of Intermediate and Secondary Education Quaid e Azam University
- Principal: Professor Yaseen Afaqi
- Students: 7000 (Approx)
- Location: Islamabad, Islamabad Capital Territory, 44000, Pakistan; 33.71818394271404°N 73.08861915439469°E
- Campus: Urban
- Nickname: ICB
- Website: www.icb.edu.pk
- Location in Islamabad Capital Territory

Islamabad College for Boys (ICB) is the oldest boys college in Islamabad, Pakistan, under the administration of Federal Directorate of Education (FDE). It is situated on Shaheed e Millat road in Sector G-6/3 near Lal Masjid and the Melody market of Islamabad.

The institution has historically contributed significantly to the country's law enforcement and administrative leadership, having produced numerous police officers, including several Inspector Generals of Police (IGPs), as well as high-ranking civil and military bureaucrats.

In a recent development (2024), a software technology park has been established in the college to provide co-working space to individuals and companies while bringing together the industry and academia to foster innovation.

== History ==
The college was established in 1966 during the early years of the city. Hamid Hassan Siddique served as the founding principal of the institution. Born in 1917, he migrated to Pakistan during November 1947 after which he became founder principal of Govt. School, Jail Road, Karachi. He also remained as Deputy Inspector of Schools in 1953, founder principal of Residential Model School, Dhan Mandi, Dhaka in 1958 before serving as founder principal of Islamabad College for Boys in 1966. He last served as Inspector of Schools in Karachi during 1972. Later on, in 1975 M.K.A Baig was appointed as principal of the college. He tenure is regarded as golden period of the institution. Later on, Muhammad Subhanullah became Vice Principal in 1982 & served till 1992, when he was promoted to Principal. He had two tenures as principal of the institution.

ICB conducts classes from class Prep to the Post-Graduate level. For secondary and higher secondary classes, it is affiliated with the Federal Board of Intermediate and Secondary Education, Islamabad. The external exam for degree classes is conducted by the Quaid-i-Azam University, Islamabad.

ICB has over 7,000 students, about 3,500 in the morning and about 3,500 in the evening shift. It has two computer labs, as well as science labs for physics, chemistry, zoology, and botany. There are three libraries. It has three canteens. Formerly, there was a hostel but it was converted into classrooms.

Dr. Helal ud Din Ahmed, a retired Additional Secretary of the Bangladesh Government, on world teachers day expressed his deepest gratitude for the college as he studied there from year 1969–71 before being migrated to Bangladesh. Among many others, the former chief justice of Islamabad High Court and a serving judge of Supreme Court, Justice Athar Minallah is also among former students of this college.

In 2014, ICB became a degree college and started offering four year bachelor's degrees.

In 2020, Government of Pakistan built a gymnasium in the college.

During a visit to the college in year 2024, Governor Punjab Mr. Sardar Saleem Haider Khan praised the college facilities stating them at par with the best private schools in the country.

Ali Ahmed Kharral serves as the current principal, having been appointed in November 2018.

== Alumni ==
As per available information following are notable graduates from the institute:

1. Ahmed Wani: A distinguished officer of Pakistan Administrative Service (PAS) having over 22 years of experience in public sector. He currently serves as a Federal Secretary.
2. Nadeem Mahbub: A senior civil servant and a BPS-21 officer of the Pakistan Administrative Service (PAS). He currently serves as Secretary of the Ministry of National Health Services, Regulations & Coordination. Previously, he was Special Secretary at the Ministry of Interior
3. Dr. Sultan Azam Temuri: A distinguished civil servant belonging to Police Service of Pakistan (PSP). He served at various senior positions both in Pakistan and internationally. He also served as Inspector General of Islamabad Police. He dedicated 33 years to field of law enforcement before retiring in January 2022.
4. General Sahir Shamshad Mirza: A Four Star General serving in Pakistan Army.
5. Lieutenant General Ahmed Sharif Chaudhry: Three Star General serving in Pakistan Army.
6. Vice Admiral Owais Ahmed Bilgrami: A Flag Officer in Pakistan Navy. Currently serving as Vice Chief of the Naval Staff (VCNS).
7. Mujahid Anwer Khan: A decorated air warrior and served as Chief of Air Staff of Pakistan Air force.
8. Khawer Rabbani: Advocate, Trainer, AI Lawyer, and former Team Analyst for Pakistan Cricket Team. A distinguished ICB alumnus, he is a four-time consecutive scholarship recipient, Gold Medalist of the Silver Jubilee, and thirteen-time consecutive topper.
9. Dr. Adil Najam: A renowned educationist and served as Vice Chancellor of the Lahore University of Management Sciences (LUMS). In 2023, he also started serving as President of WWF International.
10. Muhammad Shahbaz Jameel: A professional banker having over 27 years of experience. He served as president and CEO of Zarai Taraqiati Bank Limited (ZTBL) and MD/CEO of the Bank of Khyber.
