= Ali Moeen Nawazish =

Pakistani academic (born 1990)

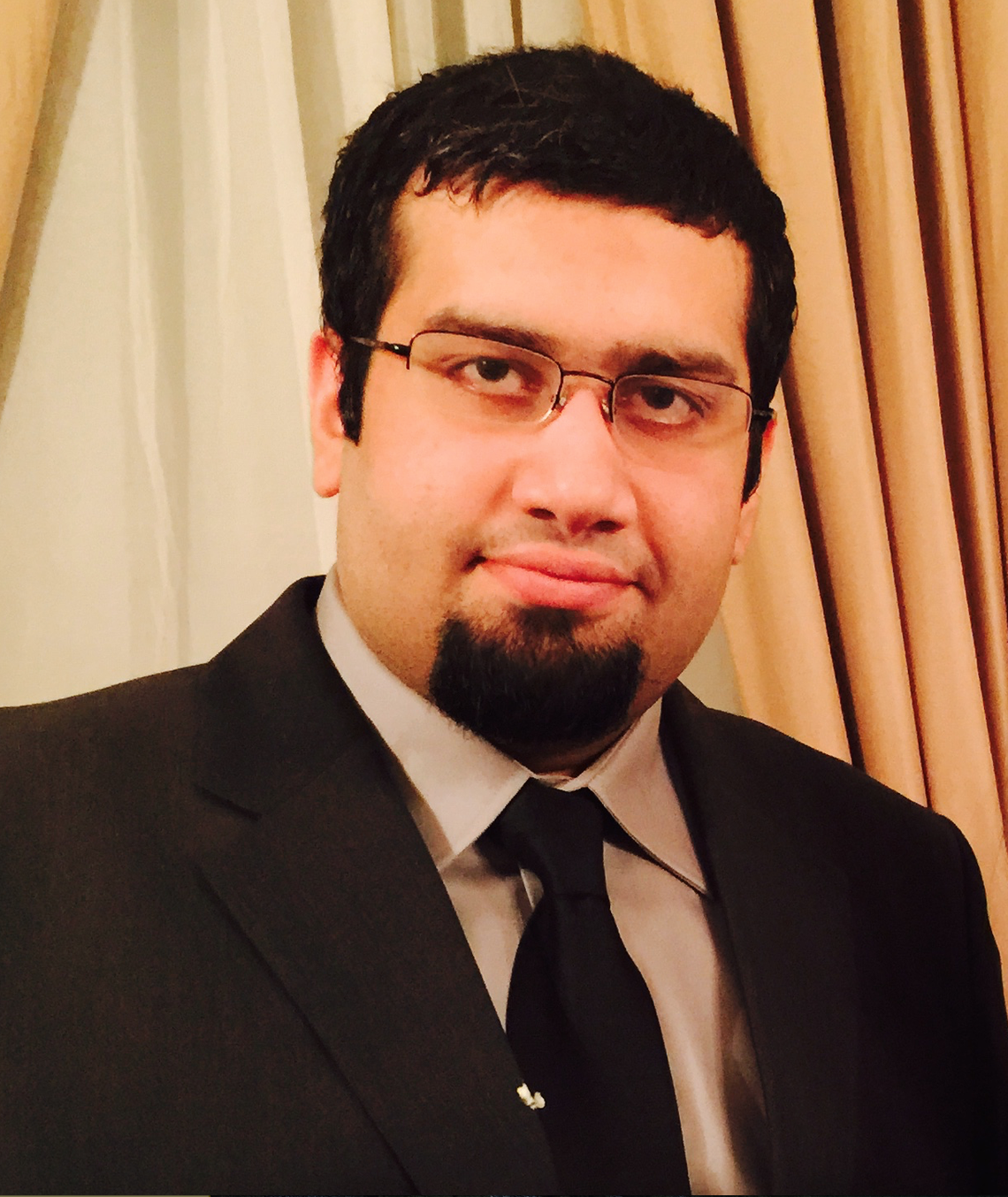
- Born: Ali Moeen Nawazish; 21 February 1990 (age 36); Rawalpindi, Pakistan
- Education: St Mary's Academy Lalazar, Rawalpindi; Roots School System; Trinity Hall, Cambridge; Columbia Journalism School
- Occupations: General Manager Strategy and Innovation at Jang Media Group; Youth Ambassador, Columnist, Strategist at Geo TV
- Awards: Pride of Performance Award by the President of Pakistan in 2009

Ali Moeen Nawazish (Urdu: علی معین نوازش) is a Pakistani columnist and media manager who works as the General Manager of Strategy and a weekly columnist for Daily Jang newspaper.

== Early life ==
Nawazish was born in Rawalpindi, Pakistan and has spent most of his life there. He studied at St Mary's Academy (Rawalpindi), Roots School System during his General Certificate of Education. His academic performance oscillated as a child and sometimes he barely passed his examinations. He has claimed that he wishes to achieve greatness and make a name for himself and his homeland. He received 9 A's in his O Level, along with a "Top in World" award in computer studies.

Nawazish rose to popularity in 2009 for securing 22 A grades, 1B and 1C A Levels, a world record at that time. He went on to obtain his bachelor's degree in Politics and International Relations from Trinity Hall, Cambridge, and then completed a master's degree in journalism from the: Columbia University Graduate School of Journalism.

== Media attention ==
In 2009, Nawazish completed his A Levels in 23 subjects, a world record at that time. The subjects he took included physics, chemistry, biology, math, further mathematics, sociology, Urdu literature, travel and tourism, general further mathematics, computer studies, ICT, psychology, critical thinking, marine sciences, English language, thinking skills, geography, pure mathematics, general paper, business studies, applied geography, general studies and human biology. He also received awards for the highest marks in the country in computing and ICT.

Nawazish's A Level result was taken up by the international media. He was interviewed by or quoted in a number of newspapers and TV channels including Times Online, The Telegraph, Daily Mail, Khaleej Times, The Independent, BBC, CNN, Al Jazeera.

== Awards and recognition ==
- Pride of Performance Award by the President of Pakistan in 2009. which is one of the highest honours in Pakistan.

Ali was congratulated personally by the Pakistani prime minister, Yousaf Raza Gillani, and the chief-minister of Punjab, the province he belongs to. Both of these people invited him as a guest to encourage him. In addition, many TV channels including BBC in Britain and Geo TV and Pakistan Television Corporation among many others in Pakistan invited him as a guest to their various shows.

== Jang Media Group ==
Nawazish soon joined Pakistan's biggest media group; Jang Group of Newspapers and Geo TV, where he serves as a youth ambassador and columnist, using his position to highlight the issues of young people to the mainstream media where they are often neglected. He is also seen as an analyst, host and judge on different shows on media channels. He also serves as General Manager Strategy and Innovation at Jang Group. The Jang Real provides extra and relevant information, including audio, video and linked social media, of any news printed on Jang newspaper by using your smartphone camera on your device.
