= Mir Zafar Ali =

Pakistani movie visual effects artist

- Born: Karachi, Pakistan
- Occupation: Visual effects artist
- Known for: The Day After Tomorrow (2004); The Golden Compass (2007); Spider-Man 3 (2007); Ghost Rider (2007); Life of Pi (2012); Frozen (2013)

Mir Zafar Ali (Urdu: میر ظفر علی) is a Pakistani movie visual effects artist. He was a member of the team that won the Academy Award for best visual effects for the 2007 film The Golden Compass. In 2012, he was a member of the team that won the Academy Award for best visual effects for The Life of Pi and in 2014 he was a member of the team that won the Academy Award for the film Frozen. He is the first Pakistani to have been connected with an Academy Award-winner for Best Visual Effects.

== Education ==
Ali is a graduate of the Beaconhouse School System. He completed his computer science degree from National University in Pakistan. He graduated from Savannah College of Art and Design (SCAD) and, in 2019, was awarded the SCAD40 award.

== Career ==
Ali has worked on visual effects and graphics in many Hollywood movies, including The Day After Tomorrow, X-Men: First Class, Stealth, Monster House, The Golden Compass, The Incredible Hulk, Surf's Up, The Mummy: Tomb of the Dragon Emperor and Aliens in the Attic among others.

Ali has worked for several visual effects shops in Hollywood including Digital Domain and Rhythm and Hues.

== Filmography ==
Movie	Year	Role
Percy Jackson: Sea of Monsters	2013	FX Lead
Frozen	2013	FX Artist
The Cabin in the Woods	2012	FX Artist
Life of Pi	2012	FX Artist
Hop	2011	FX Technical Director
Yogi Bear	2010	FX Technical Director
Land of the Lost	2009	FX Technical Director
The Incredible Hulk	2008	Technical Director
Spider-Man 3	2007	FX Animator
The Golden Compass	2007	FX Technical Director
Monster House	2006	FX Technical Director
Open Season	2006	FX Artist
Stealth	2005	FX Animator
The Day After Tomorrow	2004	FX Artist
