= Maarco Francis =

Seychellois politician and entrepreneur (born 1977)

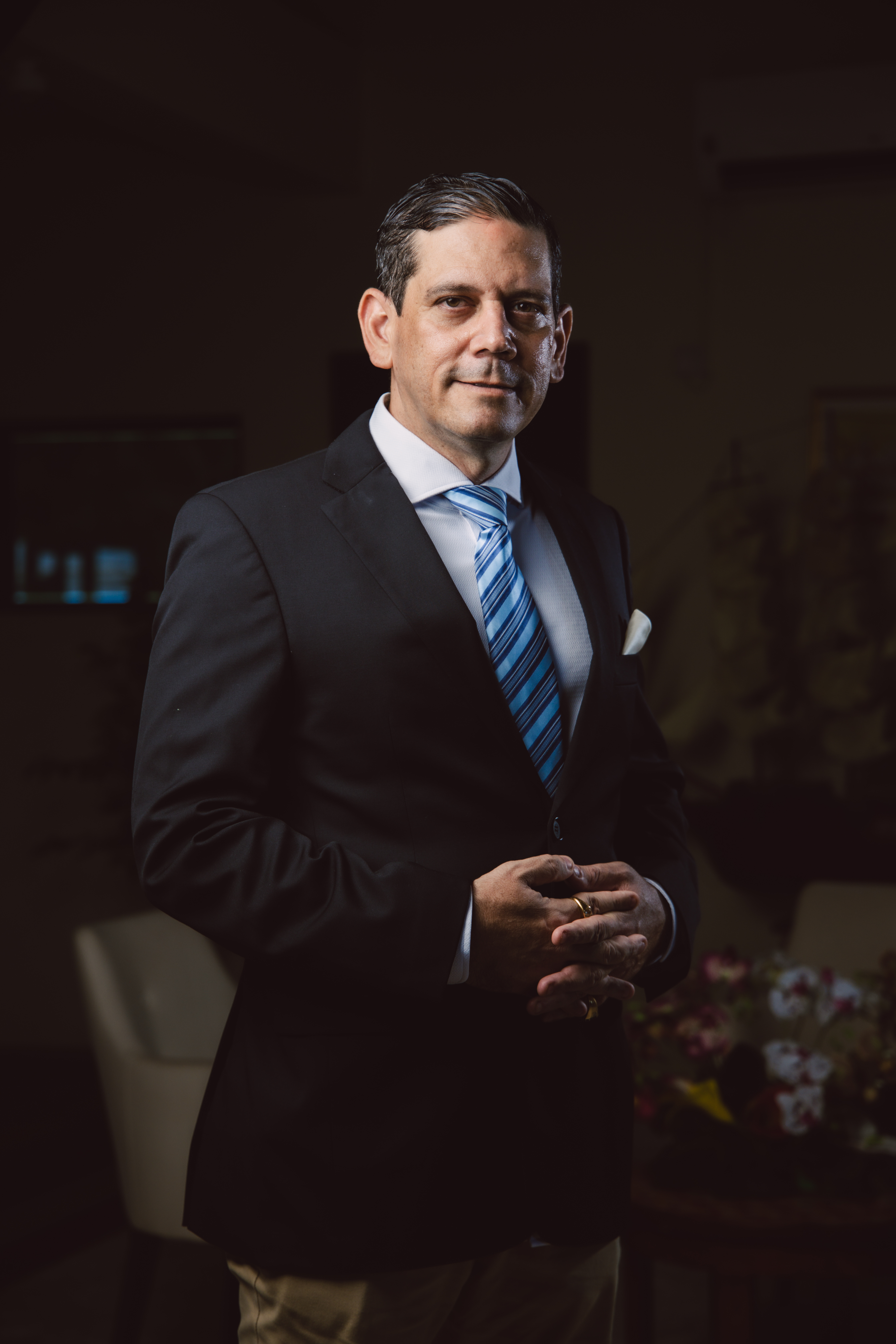
- Born: 1 November 1977 (age 48); Victoria, Seychelles
- Occupations: politics; entrepreneur
- Spouse: Sherin Francis
- Children: 2

Maarco Francis (born 1 November 1977 in Victoria) is a Seychellois politician and entrepreneur. He is the leader of the Seychelles United Movement (SUM), the third-largest political party in the country and part of the opposition. Francis was a candidate in the 2025 presidential election. He previously headed the Seychelles Chamber of Commerce and Industry (SCCI).

== Biography ==
Maarco Francis was born in 1 November 1977 in the capital of the Seychelles, Victoria.

He is the owner of a number of businesses, including Levasseur Rum, AAA International Service Ltd, and the Grow Seychelles agricultural initiative. He has also established a successful offshore services business. According to Africa Intelligence, in 2015 he was one of the five most influential businessmen in Seychelles.

Francis is actively involved in the public life of the country. He has headed the charitable foundation Better Life, as well as the Seychelles International Financial Services Association (SIFSA). He is Chairman of AAA Management Services Ltd. He has also acted as a consultant on local government issues and participated in public hearings on legislative initiatives.

In 2006, he managed Philippe Boullé's campaign for the presidential election.

In March 2013, he was elected president of the Seychelles Chamber of Commerce and Industry. He was re-elected in February 2015, but resigned in 2016. He has represented the country at international forums, including the Indian Ocean Rim Association (IORA), African Union events and Commonwealth of Nations summits. In 2015, he became a member of the National Arts Council.

From 2014 to 2017, he was a board member of the Seychelles National AIDS Council.

In July 2023, he applied for registration of his own political party - United Movement of Seychelles (SUM), of which he is president. The party's registration was opposed by the United Seychelles party, which considered that the name SUM was too similar to its own. Despite the objections, the party was officially registered and became the seventh largest political force in the country.

In 2024, Francis criticised the proposed amendments to the Seychelles Constitution, stating that they were being adopted without proper discussion with civil society. He also drew attention to the deteriorating human rights situation and freedom of expression.

He is a candidate in the 2025 presidential election to be held in September.

== Personal life ==
He is married to Sherin Francis, Seychelles Chief Secretary for Tourism. He has two daughters.
