= Roots Ivy International University =

Education institute in Pakistan providing study for degrees from distant universities

- Type: University College
- Established: 2003
- Chancellor: Khadija Mushtaq
- Location: Islamabad/Rawalpindi area, Pakistan
Colours

Roots Ivy International University College is a for-profit university college affiliated with University of London International Programmes and the BPP University in UK.

It is located in Rawalpindi/Islamabad area of Pakistan. It has several branches all over Pakistan.

Khadija Mushtaq is its founder and dean.

It is associated with the for-profit Roots School System in Pakistan.

It also provides degrees in affiliation with Association of Chartered Certified Accountants, Higher National Diploma and Institute of Commercial Management.

It also has satellite campuses in Faisalabad and Islamabad.

== Academics ==
=== Distant and flexible learning ===
A broad range of undergraduate degrees by University of London are offered:

- Economics
- Business Management
- Finance
- Social Sciences
- Offers B.A. LLB and M.A. LLM Law degrees provided by the BPP University International Programme
- Roots Ivy International University students are also encouraged to learn German language and then go to Germany for further studies there.
