= Faisal Mushtaq =

Pakistani politician

Chaudhry Faisal Mushtaq چودھری فیصل مشتاق
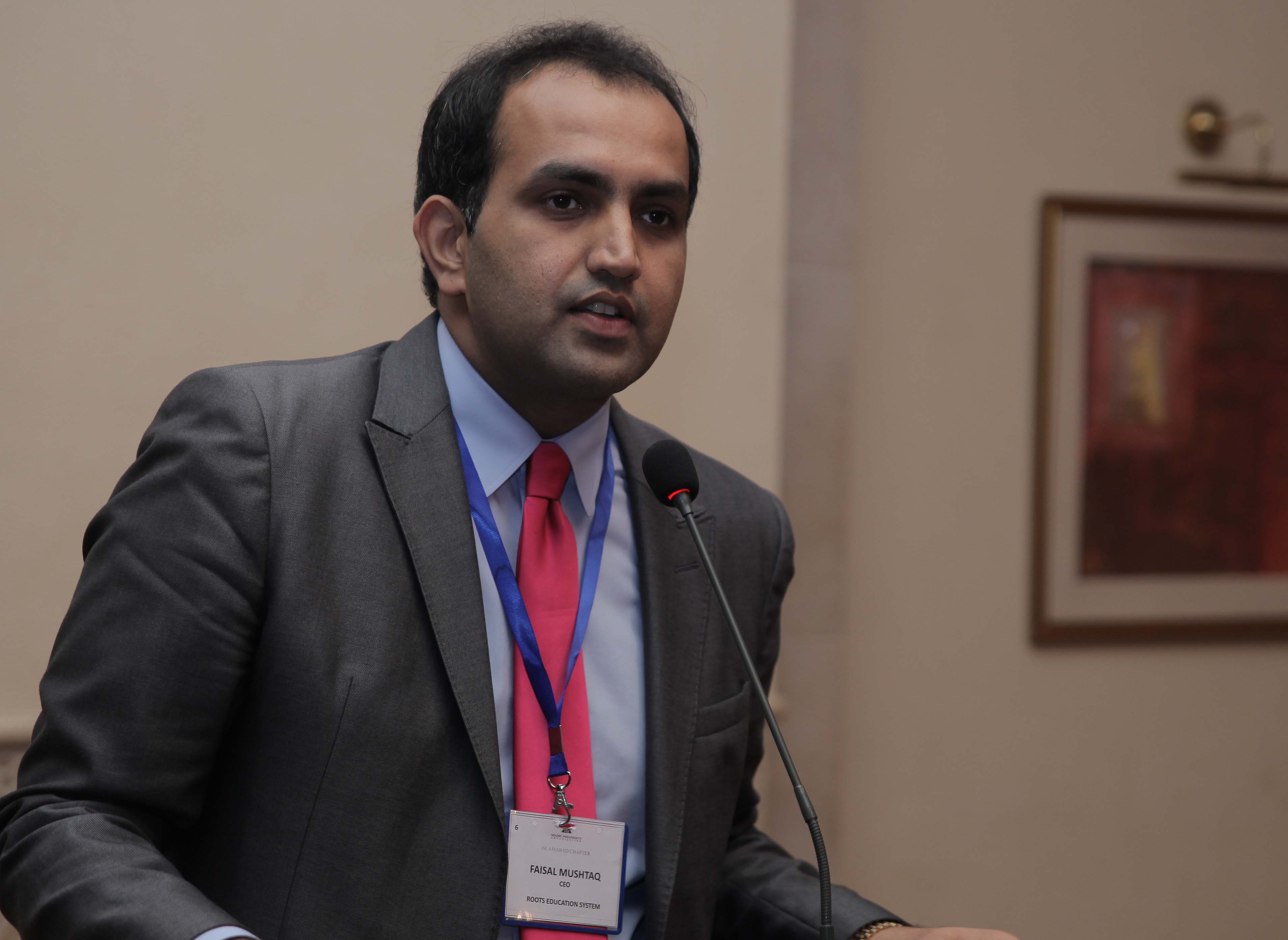
- Born: 27 July 1978 (age 48); Kharian, Pakistan
- Education: Finance; Accounting; Economics; National Security
- Alma mater: National Defense University; University of Salford; London School of Economics; Cadet College Hasan Abdal
- Occupations: Teacher, student counselor, entrepreneur
- Honours: Honorary Doctorate of Education, University of Hertfordshire UK

Tamgha-e-Imtiaz Recipient
- Date: 23 March 2013
- Country: Islamic Republic of Pakistan
- Presented by: President of Pakistan

Chaudhry Faisal Mushtaq (Urdu: چودھری فیصل مشتاق; TI; born 27 July 1978) is a Pakistani academic, school practitioner and former caretaker provincial minister for the education of Punjab. He is the founder and chief executive officer of Roots Millennium Schools, Pakistan and is the executive director and member of the board of directors of the Roots School System.

He is recognized as one of the 500 most influential Muslims of the world for the last three consecutive years, a Young Presidents' Organization Board member, World Wide Fund for Nature Member of the Board of Governors Pakistan, Cadet College Hasanabdal Member of the Board of Governors and the Chairman of the China Radio International Roots Confucius Classroom Project in Pakistan. Faisal is also the founder and CEO of a non-profit organisation 'Change – in Education Foundation' working in support of 'Public Private Partnerships' across education and thus scaling Millennium Development Goals and so far has successfully reformed more than 250 government schools across various districts, provinces and rural communities in Pakistan.

Faisal has been conferred with the fourth-highest National Civil Award of Pakistan, the 'Tamgha-e-Imtiaz', by the President of Pakistan Asif Ali Zardari on Pakistan Day Ceremony held at the Presidency on 23 March 2013 in recognition of his outstanding services in the field of language promotion, education, literacy, youth and advocacy.

== Personal life ==
Faisal Mushtaq was born in 1978, in Kharian, his father Mushtaq Rasul Chaudary was a colonel in the Pakistan Army and mother Riffat Mushtaq an academic and teacher. In 1988 his mother, Riffat Mushtaq, founded Roots School System.

== Education ==
In 1997, he completed his higher secondary education in sciences from Cadet College Hasan Abdal. Later that year, he moved to the United Kingdom for higher education. In 1998, he did diploma in Economics from the London School of Economics. He got his degree with honours in finance and accounting from the University of Salford in 2001. In 2006, he graduated from the National Defense University after completing a national security workshop. Faisal is a certified teacher and trainer by the Cambridge International Examinations United Kingdom. He also serves as the visiting faculty at the National Defense University.

== Career ==
After completing his school in 2001, Chaudhry Faisal Mushtaq started working at PricewaterhouseCoopers in London as a financial management consultant.

In 2002, he joined IBM Global Services as a business consultant.

After a few years as a consultant in the United Kingdom, he returned to Pakistan to follow in the footsteps of his mother and joined the private education sector. He became director of Roots School System in 2004, and since then, has been associated with it.

=== Roots Millennium Schools, Pakistan ===
Under his management, the Roots schools now offer continuous education from Montessori up to the undergraduate level with nearly 2000 employees in more than 20 major cities across Pakistan. His purpose-built schools pioneered classroom teaching innovations from the introduction of the Chinese language across school curriculum to gaining Microsoft mentor school status 2014 from Microsoft USA. Other ideas and flagship initiatives include the inclusion of German language Pasch Program with the Goethe Institute, Authoring of Intel Skills for Success Information Communication Technology Curriculum, WWF Green school program, Global citizenship in action program with the British Council, Professional development with Cambridge International Examinations and Robotics Program with World Robotics Organization. He established teacher training and development institute 'Roots National Institute of Teacher Training & Education', where more than 10,000 teachers from both the public and private sectors have been trained on international standards and won placements.

=== Future World School FWS ===
Future World Schools is another unique and exclusive project of Dr. Faisal Mushtaq offering International qualifications from Early Level to IB, IGCSE programmes including O, AS level and A level. Its objective is to provide education, learning and teaching according to the needs and requirements of the 21st century learner.

Dr. Faisal built state of the art purpose built Future World Campuses in major cities of Pakistan like Islamabad, Rawalpindi, Lahore and Karachi that provides learners with unique learning opportunities with modern broad-based curriculum which is further enhanced and supported by fully equipped classrooms and IT suites.

=== The Millennium Universal Colleges TMUC ===
Mushtaq is a co-founder and CEO of The Millennium Universal Colleges (TMUC). Chaudhry Faisal Mushtaq Tamgha-e-Imtiaz, is a distinguished academician, who has garnered much veneration through his contributions to the education industry. The Millennium Universal College (TMUC) is a one of its kind educational institute offering globally accredited qualifications in state-of-the-art campuses, allowing students to have a holistic educational experience and a progressive international perspective.

Over the course of the last decade, the Millennium Education Group has grown exponentially under the dynamic leadership of Mr. Faisal Mushtaq. To honour his achievements and afford recognition to his vision, Mr. Faisal Mushtaq has been presented an Honorary PHD degree by the University of Hertfordshire, one of the most prestigious universities of the UK, and a long-standing partner of TMUC.

=== Honorary Doctorate Degree of Education ===
Faisal Mushtaq has been conferred an Honorary Degree of Doctor of Education from the University of Hertfordshire United Kingdom in recognition of his outstanding and exemplary services to education in Pakistan and for his contribution to the promotion of teaching and learning in the Pakistani society. The doctorate degree was conferred in a ceremony held on 6 September 2021 at St Albans Cathedral UK and presided by the Vice Chancellor of the University of Hertfordshire Professor Quintin McKellar CBE. The honorary degree is a testament to Mr Mushtaq's contribution in advocating education in Pakistan over the last 3 decades.

== Philanthropy ==
In 2008, Chaudhry Faisal Mushtaq founded 'Change – in Education Foundation', which is a social and developmental sector not for profit organization committed to bridging the gap in education services provision in Pakistan. He is promoting public/private partnerships across district, provincial and federal levels in Pakistan. He is also an active environmentalist and contributor to the greener community through World Wide Fund for Nature Pakistan.

== Critical recognition ==
- Recipient of fourth-highest civil award 'Tamgha-e-Imtiaz' by President Asif Ali Zardari at the Pakistan Day ceremony in 2013 in recognition of his 'outstanding services in the field of education, promotion of Chinese language across Pakistan, educational change sponsor and globally recognized school and education management practitioner'.
- Recognized and added to the latest edition of ‘The Muslim 500’ 2014-2015 which includes names of The 500 Most Influential Muslims from around the world.
- He has been recently awarded as the ‘Best Educationist of the Year 2014’ by the Rawalpindi Chamber of Commerce and Industry in recognition of his efforts and initiatives in the field of education, teaching and learning.
- Awarded the 'Best Young Entrepreneur of the Year 2011' by the Rawalpindi Chamber of Commerce and Industry presented by Prime Minister of Pakistan Yousaf Raza Gillani.
- Awarded the 'Best Young Entrepreneur of the Year 2012' by the Rawalpindi Chamber of Commerce and Industry presented by Chief Minister of Punjab, Pakistan Shahbaz Sharif.
- Recognized by Premier of the People's Republic of China Wen Jiabao for his services in support of Chinese language promotion in Pakistan.
- He is a member of Chief Minister of Punjab, Pakistan education task force on youth.
- Member of the Board of Governors of World Wide Fund for Nature Pakistan.
- Chair of China Radio International Confucius Classroom Pakistan.
