= Islamabad Convent School =

High school in Islamabad, Pakistan

- ICS
- Islamabad, H8, F8

Information
- Funding type: Private
- Motto: "The fear of the Lord, Is the beginning of the Wisdom."
- Established: 1992
- Gender: Co-education
- Enrollment: 50,000+ students
- Classes offered: O and AS/A level, Matriculation
- Language: English-medium education
- Branches: 2

Islamabad Convent Schools, also known as "Conventarian School", is located in Islamabad. The school is Catholic. Its history started in the 1970s, and was established in 1992. It has five floors, with every group divided. It is currently run by Samina Daniel O.P.

== Groups ==
ICS, has divided sections;

- Nursery, KG, Prep - Pre Primary Group
- Class 1, 2, 3, 4 - Primary Group
- Class 5, 6, 7 - Junior Group
- Class 8, 9, 10 - Senior Group

== Principals ==
- Sister Magdalene Yousef (2024-Ongoing)
- Sister Parveen Lal (2021-2024)
- Sister Parveen Lal Rehmat (2015-2021)
