= Seychelles Tourism Board =

Government-funded tourism organization in Seychelles

Agency overview
- Formed: 1 April 2005
- Jurisdiction: Government of Seychelles
- Headquarters: Botanical House, Mont Fleuri, Mahé, Seychelles
- Agency executive: Vesna Rakić, CEO
- Parent agency: Ministry of Tourism, Civil Aviation, Ports and Marine
- Website: www.seychelles.travel

The Seychelles Tourism Board (STB), a public/private sector body, oversees most aspects of Seychelles' tourism industry. The Seychelles Tourism Board is responsible for the promotion and marketing of the Seychelles islands as a tourist destination. It was first formed in 2005. In 2021, the STB was dissolved and re-integrated into the government, but it was re-implemented as a semi-autonomous body in 2026.

== History ==
=== First iteration of the STB (2005-2021) ===
The STB was originally created in 2005 under the Seychelles Tourism Board Act, 2005. The Act brought together all regulatory and monitoring functions of the Department of Tourism within the Ministry of Tourism and Transport, and all promotional and marketing activities of the Seychelles Tourism Marketing Authority. The Policy Planning and International Co-operation Division was retained under a newly formed Department of Tourism and Transport which fell under the vice-president's office. The Seychelles Tourism Marketing Authority ceased to exist as legal entity.

However, in 2007 all policy planning and international cooperation functions for tourism in the Department of Tourism and Transport in the vice-president's office and the Seychelles Hospitality and Tourism Training College were transferred to STB.The SHTTC was then renamed the Seychelles Tourism Academy. This restructuring brought together all government agencies involved in tourism-related matters under one roof. The new structure meant the STB could serve and promote the industry more effectively and efficiently. It also brought better co-ordination and responsiveness with the trade partners to meeting the challenges of the tourism industry.

In 2010 the portfolio for tourism was transferred from the vice-president's to the president's office. In 2012, a new Ministry of Tourism and Culture was created, however, the functions and roles of Seychelles Tourism Board remained unchanged.

=== Integration into the Ministry of Tourism (2021-2026) ===
In 2021, the Seychellois government decided to dissolve the STB and integrate into the Department of Tourism, as part of broader governmental restructuring. The Seychelles Tourism Board Act of 2005 was repealed during this process. Sherin Francis, the CEO of the STB, moved into the government to become the Secretary for Tourism. All employees, contracts, liabilities, and properties of the STB were moved into the government's Tourism Department. At the time, the STB had a budget of nearly 10 million USD.

=== Re-implementation of the STB (2026) ===
The STB was re-created in 2026, five years after it was integrated into the Seychellois government. The National Assembly approved the STB in March, and Vesna Rakić was appointed as CEO in May. The new STB's primary functions are marketing the Seychelles as tourist destination and improving visitor experiences.

== Board structure ==
=== 2026 structure ===
Under the Seychelles Tourism Board Act of 2026, the current STB has a Board of Directors appointed by the President of the Seychelles, including one member each from the Ministries of Tourism and Finance. The STB's funding comes from the National Assembly, and any profits from the STB's duties.

=== 2005-2021 structure ===
The 2016 organisational structure of the Seychelles Tourism Board.

Under the STB Act 2005, STB was administered by a board of at least 12 directors, which was composed of members of the private sector and the government. It was headed by a chief executive officer for the day-to-day running of the office and administration and execution of decisions of the board of directors. The act was amended in December 2008 which changed the number of directors from 12 to 7. The amendment also established a Tourism Marketing Fund committee to manage the marketing fund and one committee to oversee the Seychelles Tourism Academy (ex-SHTTC). The act was amended again in December 2010 to reinstate the post of chief executive and add the promotion of eco-tourism among its statutory functions.

== Foreign offices ==
Seychelles Tourism Board has tourist offices in the United Kingdom, France, Italy, Spain, China and Abu Dhabi, as well as representative offices in South Africa, Mauritius, Middle East, South Korea, India, Germany, Brazil and Russia. These representative offices also handle enquiries for travel, trade and media from the US, Canada and other regions of the world where Seychelles Tourism Board does not have offices or representatives.
