= OPF Boys College Islamabad =

Coordinates: 33.682733°N 73.070531°E

- او پی ایف بوائز کالج اسلام آباد

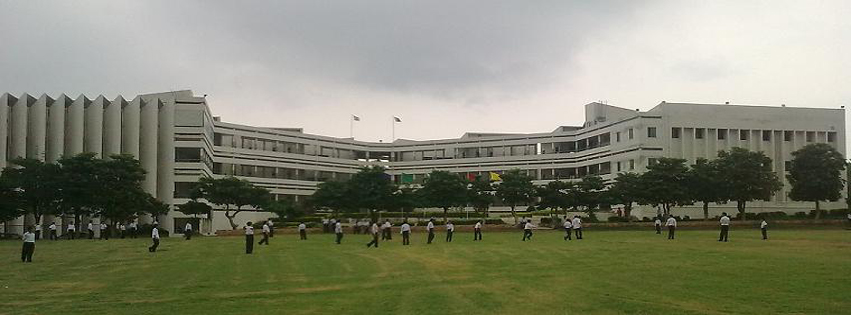
- View of OPF Boys College Islamabad from the ground
- Islamabad; Pakistan

Information
- Opened: 12 November 2001; 24 years ago
- Status: Open
- School board: FBISE and CIE
- Principal: Dr.Javed Iqbal
- Faculty: 75
- Years offered: 11-12 to 18–19
- Gender: Male
- Average class size: 20–43
- Schedule: Day school
- Houses: Sir Syed; Iqbal; Jinnah; Nishtar; Liaqat
- Website: opfcollege.edu.pk

OPF Boys College Islamabad is an educational institution located in the centre of Islamabad, Pakistan. The college is run as a project of Overseas Pakistanis Foundation (OPF). The college started functioning on 12 September 2001. The campus is spread over 56 kanals.

== Operational setup ==
The principal is the head of the institution whereas the Vice Principal coordinates all the college activities as the head of the faculty and the staff. Presently, Dr.Javed Iqbal holds the office as the Principal.

On the command hierarchy, Section Heads are the next to follow. The college is run on a four section basis:

- Junior Section (VI-VIII Classes) headed by Prof. Muhammad Khalid
- Senior Section (IX-X) headed by Prof. Jahangir Mirza
- College Section (XI-XII) headed by Dr.Nasir Hussain Bukhari
- Cambridge Section (O- and A-Levels) headed by Prof. Saleem Ahmed Hashmi

== Academics ==
The college has a strength of approximately 1400 students where around 250-300 new students are inducted every year. The college functions on an annual system.

Classes VI-VIII and Pre O Level Classes are assessed in the college internal examinations including monthly tests, term examinations and annual examination. Classes IX-XII are assessed by the Federal Board of Intermediate and Secondary Education (FBISE) examination system whereas O-Level and A-Level Classes are evaluated for promotion by Cambridge International Examinations (CIE) examination system.

== Functioning of the College ==
The college uses two different schemes of study, one affiliated with the Federal Board of Intermediate and Secondary Education (FBISE) and the second one run under University of Cambridge Local Examination Syndicate (UCLES).

In addition to the wards of residents of Rawalpindi and Islamabad, the college provides quality educational facilities to the male children of overseas Pakistanis from class VI to HSSC and CIE O- as well as A-Level.

== Activities ==
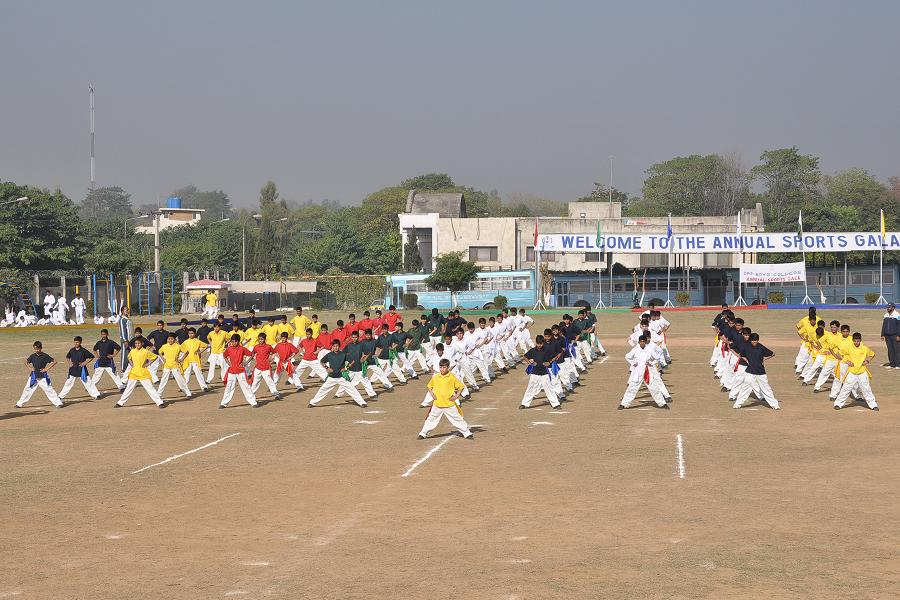
PT sisplay at Annual Sports Gala 2012 by junior students

Students take part in the diverse co/extra curricular activities initiated by the college societies and clubs. This helps the students in developing traits like confidence and creativity in them. Additionally, annual debates, declamations, quiz competitions, Qirat-Naat and inter-collegiate speech contests in English and Urdu are some of the impressive events of this i

Frequent visits by reputable scholars, toons and concerned organizations are also facilitated by the college.

Physical activities

== House System ==
Students from all classes are sorted into four different houses which are named after the leaders of the Pakistan's independence movement. All houses participate in the activities and competitions of the college.

- Sir Syed House
- Iqbal House
- Jinnah House
- Nishter House
- Liaqat House

== Leadership ==
List of Heads of the Institution
	Name	Nature of Appointment	Start of Term	End of Term
1.	Brig (R) Ghulam Rasul	Permanent	17 August 2001	30 November 2005
2.	Col (R) M. Ashraf Khan	Acting	1 December 2005	28 November 2006
3.	Gp. Captain (R) Buland Iqbal Ali	Permanent	29 November 2006	17 May 2009
4.	Prof. Muhammad Siddique	Acting	18 May 2009	21 December 2009
5.	Mr. Qaisar Nazir	Administrator	22 December 2009	4 June 2010
6.	Prof. Muhammad Siddique	Acting	5 June 2010	8 August 2010
7.	Brig (R) Muhammad Asif	Permanent	9 August 2010	22 February 2013
8.	Lt. Col (R) Sheikh Muhammad Niaz	Acting	25 February 2013	31 March 2014
9.	Prof. Muhammad Siddique	Acting	1 April 2014	31 December 2019
10.	Muhammad Anwar Rajput	Acting	1 January 2019	1 January 2023
11.	Prof. Muhammad Siddique	Acting	2 January 2023	14 January 2025
12.	Dr.Javed Iqbal	Acting	15 January 2025	to date
