= Khadija Mushtaq =

Pakistani academic administrator (1974–2025)

Dr.Khadija Mushtaq (TI)

Chancellor of Roots Ivy International University

Personal details
- Born: 23 August 1974
- Died: 14 January 2025 (aged 50)
- Children: 2 (Neha and Meer)
- Education: Quaid-i-Azam University (M.Ec.)
- Occupation: Academic administrator, educator
- Awards: Tamgha-e-Imtiaz (Medal of Distinction) (2011)
- Website: www.rootsivyintschools.edu.pk

Khadija Mushtaq was a Pakistani academic administrator and educator. She was the chancellor of Roots Ivy International University and chief executive officer of the Roots School System.

== Education ==
Mushtaq completed a Master of Economics degree with a specialization in development studies and monetary policy from Quaid-i-Azam University.

== Career ==
Mushtaq began her career as a teacher. She was an advocate for starting education at an early age. Mushtaq was the chief executive officer of Roots School System (RSS). Mushtaq founded and led the University of London International Programme at RSS. She was the principal of the largest RSS campus, in Defence Housing Authority, Islamabad.

Mushtaq was the chancellor of Roots Ivy International University.

Mushtaq was an activist and patron to several non-governmental organizations including the 'Liberating the Girl Child Foundation'.

She was the founder of Roots IVY International Schools, Roots IVY International College and IVY College of Management Sciences.

She was the pioneer of Transnational Education (TNE) in Pakistan.

== Personal life ==
Khadija had two children. She died on 14 January 2025 of cancer.

== Awards and honours ==
- Mushtaq received the Yale Educator Award in 2009 and the Best Councillor Award from Massachusetts Institute of Technology (MIT) in 2010.
- In 2011, Mushtaq was awarded the Tamgha-e-Imtiaz (Medal of Distinction) Award in the field of education by the President of Pakistan.
- Mushtaq received the Claus Nobel Educator of Distinction award from the National Society of High School Scholars, and the Counsellor's Award from Richmond University and New York University.
- Mushtaq received an honorary doctorate degree from BPP University (UK), and has received awards for her work in education.

== See also ==
- List of women presidents or chancellors of co-ed colleges and universities
