= Roots School System =

For-profit school system in Pakistan

- Formation: April 10, 1988; 38 years ago
- Founder: Riffat Mushtaq
- Founded at: Rawalpindi, Punjab, Pakistan
- Purpose: Education
- Headquarters: Rawalpindi
- Location: Punjab, Pakistan
- Coordinates: 33.579°N 73.045°E
- Region served: Pakistan
- Services: Education
- Key people: Mushtaque R. Chaudhry (CEO); Riffat Mushtaq
- Website: www.rootsschool.edu.pk

The Roots School System (RSS) is a school system based in Rawalpindi, Pakistan.

== History ==
The organization was founded in 1988 by Riffat Mushtaq with the first institution at Harley Street Rawalpindi. The organization has spread with her children operating separately in what Riffat describes as "healthy competition": Khadija Mushtaq being CEO of the Roots Ivy International University; Faisal CEO of Roots Millennium Schools; and Walid CEO of Roots International Schools.

As of 2016 RSS was the only system in Pakistan that catered from ages two and over to undergraduate.

== Alumni ==
- Ali Moeen Nawazish, academic and columnist at the Jang Group

== See also ==
- Beaconhouse School System
