= Sherin Francis =

Seychellois economist and finance expert (born 1984)

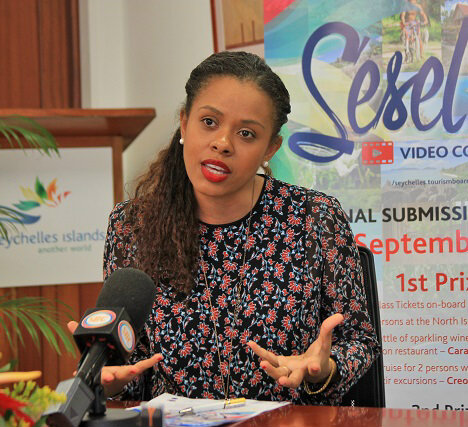
- Sherin Francis at the launch of the Sesel sa! video competition in 2016
- Born: Sherin Naiken; 30 March 1984 (age 42); Anse Royale, Mahé, Seychelles
- Education: University of Manchester; University of London
- Occupations: economist; finance expert
- Years active: 2006–present
- Employer: Ministry of Foreign Affairs and Tourism
- Spouse: Maarko Francis
- Children: 2: Elisabeth; Emma

Sherin Francis (born 30 March 1984) is a Seychellois economist and finance expert. She is the Principal Secretary for the Tourism Department, which is under the purview of the Ministry for Foreign Affairs and Tourism. Prior to her appointment as the head of the Tourism Department in April 2021, She was the chief executive officer of the Seychelles Tourism Board, for eight years. Under her leadership, tourism has increased with specific campaigns targeting markets such as the United Kingdom.

== Early life and education ==
Sherin Francis born Naiken grew up in the Anse Royale administrative district of Mahé, Seychelles, where she completed her early education. She holds a BSc degree in Economics and Business Studies from the University of Manchester, U.K; and an MSc degree in Finance from the University of London.

== Career ==
She started her career in 2006 at the Ministry of National Development as an industrial officer before she rose through the ranks to become director of investment promotion. In July 2013, she was appointed CEO of the Seychelles Tourism Board, succeeding Elsia Grandcourt.

In 2015, she remained upbeat about the tourism prospect of the islands, attributing the economic reforms of the government for the increase of visitors early in the year, particularly from the UK and France. She also linked this with a marketing drive executed under her leadership of the tourism board, with the campaign "luxury within reach" targeting potential visitors in the UK. To further promote this work, she appeared in interviews with the BBC, The Daily Telegraph and CNN.

== Personal life ==
She is married to Maarko Francis, a businessman and former chairman of the Seychelles Chamber of Commerce and Industry. Together, they have two children.
