= 1-Fluoro(18F)-1-deoxyephedrine =

1-Fluoro(^{18}F)-1-deoxyephedrine

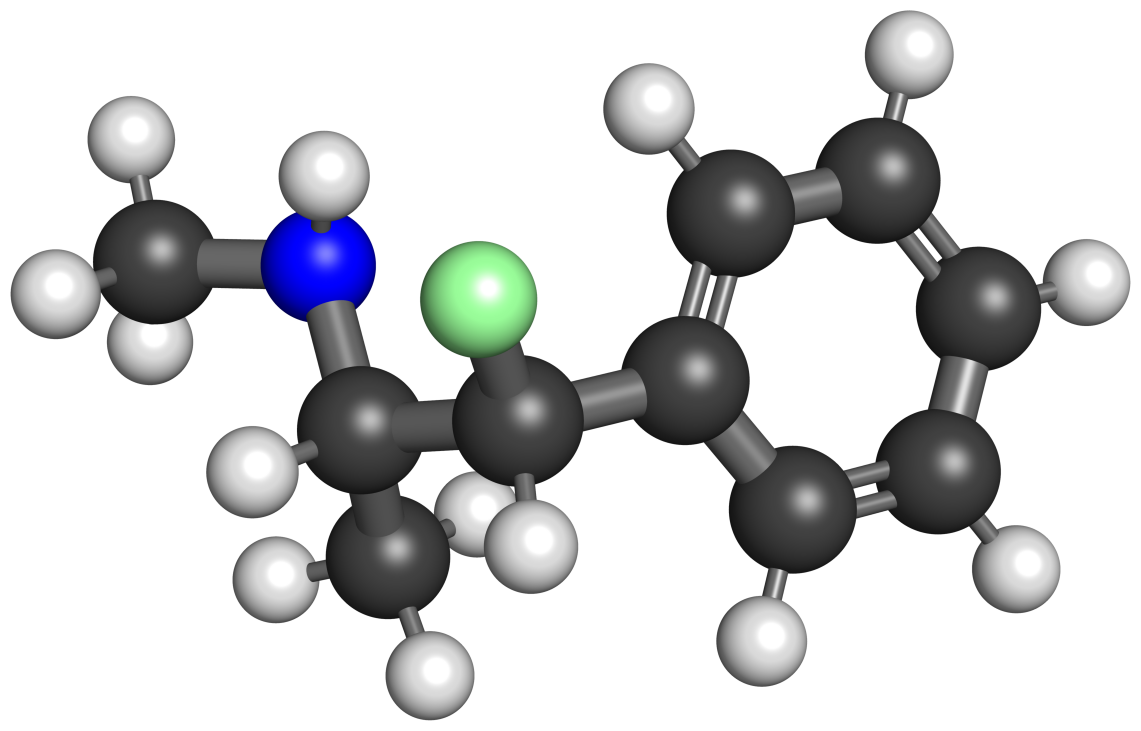

Names
- IUPAC name (1R,2S)-1-(18F)fluoro-N-methyl-1-phenylpropan-2-amine

Identifiers
CAS Number	161403-39-0
3D model (JSmol)	Interactive image
ChemSpider	165842
PubChem CID	190963
CompTox Dashboard (EPA)	DTXSID90936521
- InChI: InChI=1S/C10H14FN/c1-8(12-2)10(11)9-6-4-3-5-7-9/h3-8,10,12H,1-2H3/t8-,10-/m0/s1/i11-1 Key: QHGKNGIWQABHRY-QJOTUPEMSA-N
- SMILES: C[C@@H]([C@@H](C1=CC=CC=C1)[18F])NC

Properties
Chemical formula	C_{10}H_{14}FN
Molar mass	167.227 g·mol^{−1}
- Except where otherwise noted, data are given for materials in their standard state (at 25 °C [77 °F], 100 kPa). Infobox references

1-Fluoro(18F)-1-deoxyephedrine (1-[¹⁸F]Fluoro-1-deoxyephedrine, [¹⁸F]FDE, FDE) is chemical compound, a radiotracer, used in positron emission tomography (PET) for in vivo imaging of biochemical processes in the brain. In its chemical structure, it is a fluorinated analogue of ephedrine, where the hydroxyl group in the beta position is replaced by the isotope fluorine-18.

It has high lipophilicity, allowing it to penetrate the blood-brain barrier without hindrance, which was accompanied by high, uniform uptake by the brain (approximately 8% of the administered dose), similar to that observed for the structurally related analogue [11C]methamphetamine. The ephedrine (1R,2S) isomer is three times more effective than the pseudoephedrine (1S,2S) isomer, it is a metabolically stable compound.
