= Wesley Berry Flowers =

- Type: Private company
- Industry: Gifting
- Founded: 1946
- Founder: Wesley Berry
- Headquarters: Detroit, United States
- Area served: International
- Products: Flowers, cakes, gifts, and chocolates.
- Number of employees: 300
- Subsidiaries: Flower Delivery Express
- Website: wesleyberry.net

Wesley Berry Flowers is one of the largest floral, gifts, gourmet foods, and plants retailer in North America. The company is the parent organization of the floral brand Flower Delivery Express, or FDE.

== History ==
Founded by Wesley Berry Sr. in 1946, Wesley Berry Flowers began selling franchises in summer of 1985. The first franchise was opened at Sunset Corners shopping center in Troy, Michigan. In the 1980s, the company ran more than 1,000 television commercials a year. The company established 30 franchises across five states before selling most of them in the 1990s and launching an e-commerce business in 1994.

In 2010, the company operated one of the larger online floral businesses in the U.S. through several websites, with a single franchise left in Canton Township, plus four brick-and-mortar stores in metro Detroit operating as Commerce Township-based Wesley Berry Flowers. In 2014, the company conducted a high-profile Valentine's Day flower delivery demonstration using drones, which was halted by the Federal Aviation Administration after determining that required flight authorizations had not been obtained. The experiment was among the earliest publicly reported commercial drone delivery attempts in the United States. By 2016, the company closed several local storefronts as part of a transition to an online-focused business model. As of 2023, the business continued operating primarily through its e-commerce platforms while maintaining its headquarters in Commerce Township, Michigan.

== Recognition ==
Under the Wesley Berry Flowers name, the combined businesses ranked No. 2,269 on Inc. magazine's 2015 list of the 5,000 fastest-growing companies, with $52.6 million in reported revenue for 2014, up from $11.9 million in 2010.

The company's CEO Wesley Berry appeared on Fox Business Network to discuss drone delivery flights on February 18, 2014.

== Philanthropy ==
Since its founding in 1946, Wesley Berry Flowers has supported many nonprofit organizations, including Children's Miracle Network, American Cancer Society, Make-A-Wish, Habitat for Humanity, Optimist International, Rotary International, National Breast Cancer Foundation, and American Red Cross. Working with the West Bloomfield Optimist Club, the company sponsors college tuition scholarships and providing Christmas gifts for underprivileged children. The company has honored Martin Luther King Jr.'s memory by giving away more than 168,000 roses on Martin Luther King Jr. Day.
