= The Millennium Universal College =

College in Pakistan

Coordinates: 33.65276°N 73.01820°E

- Motto: "To create, curate, preserve, and disseminate knowledge"
- Type: Private
- Established: 2009
- Founder: Chaudhry Faisal Mushtaq
- Academic staff: 100+
- Students: 2000+
- Location: Islamabad, Pakistan
- Language: English
- Website: www.tmuc.edu.pk

The Millennium Universal College (TMUC) is a college in Pakistan.

== History ==
The Millennium Universal College (TMUC) was established in 2009 by educationist Chaudhry Faisal Mushtaq as the higher education and transnational education (TNE) division of the Roots Millennium Education Group. It was set up to provide foreign higher education credentials locally in Pakistan to reduce the financial and logistical constraints associated with studying abroad.

The institution's primary campus opened in Sector H-11/4, Islamabad, offering undergraduate and postgraduate qualifications in partnership with international universities and certifying bodies. Early institutional collaborations included recognition as a teaching centre for the University of London, providing external degrees in law (LLB, LLM) and social sciences with academic direction from constituent colleges such as the London School of Economics. It subsequently formed academic partnerships with the University of Hertfordshire for degrees in computer science and business administration, as well as the University for the Creative Arts (UCA) and Pearson for Higher National Diplomas (BTEC HND).

Following its initial operations in Islamabad, the college expanded across Pakistan, setting up additional campuses in Rawalpindi, Lahore, Karachi, and Gujranwala. The external qualifications offered by the institution are delivered under the regulatory policies of the Higher Education Commission of Pakistan regarding foreign transnational degree frameworks.

== Accreditation and affiliation ==
- It is affiliated with Edexcel International Examinations, United Kingdom.
- It is affiliated with University of London United Kingdom for international degree Programs.
- It holds a membership of Goethe institute Germany to promote German language in Pakistan.
- Member of Islamabad Chamber of Commerce and Industry, Pakistan.
