= Beaconhouse School System =

Private school in Pakistan

- Pakistan

Information
- Motto: Seek the Light
- Established: 4 November 1975
- Enrollment: Over 315,000 students
- Language: English-medium education
- Color
- Athletics conference: Beaconhouse International Student Convention
- Alumni: Beaconite
- Website: www.beaconhouse.net

The Beaconhouse School System (BSS), established in 1978, is a private, for-profit preparatory school system in Pakistan. It has over 146 campuses in major cities across Pakistan. BSS also operates independent divisions in Belgium, Malaysia, Oman, the Philippines, Thailand, the UAE and the United Kingdom. Its activities extend beyond education in some countries.

In 2019, referring to the business model of Beaconhouse and other private schools in Pakistan, in a case regarding the exorbitant fees these schools charged, the Chief Justice of Pakistan observed, "No business other than drugs can bring in such profits."

== History ==
Beaconhouse was established in November 1975 in Lahore, Pakistan as the Les Anges Montessori Academy for toddlers by Nasreen Kasuri, wife of former Foreign Minister of Pakistan Khurshid Mahmud Kasuri. Beaconhouse opened its first branch, Beaconhouse Public School in Lahore in 1978. In 1982, BSS initiated a teacher education program with the Moray House School of Education in Scotland.

In 1986, Beaconhouse constructed its first purpose-built campus in Hyderabad and a teacher education program for in-service teachers was started with the University of Bradford in 1993. In 1996, the World Bank Group, through its private sector wing, the International Finance Corporation, entered into a financing arrangement with Beaconhouse aimed at the construction of 13 new campuses.

In September 2012, Nasreen Kasuri received a "Pakistan Women Power 100 award".

== Suspension for charging excessive fee ==
In late 2018, Beaconhouse was one of two private school chains in Pakistan who had registration of 115 of their campuses suspended for charging excessive tuition fee in violation of rulings of the Supreme Court of Pakistan and the Sindh High Court.

In one of the cases, a Beaconhouse counsel insisted in a Supreme Court hearing that the authorities imposing an upper limit on whatever tuition fees private school wished to charge was unjustifiable. To this, the chief justice of Pakistan noted that according to the Beaconhouse audit report, it had made a Rs 1.4 billion profit after all expenditures. "After all this, how you can say that imposing an upper limit on school fees is unjustifiable."

== School network ==
Beaconhouse owns school companies and educational institutes in several countries. Some of these are profiled below.

=== Pakistan ===
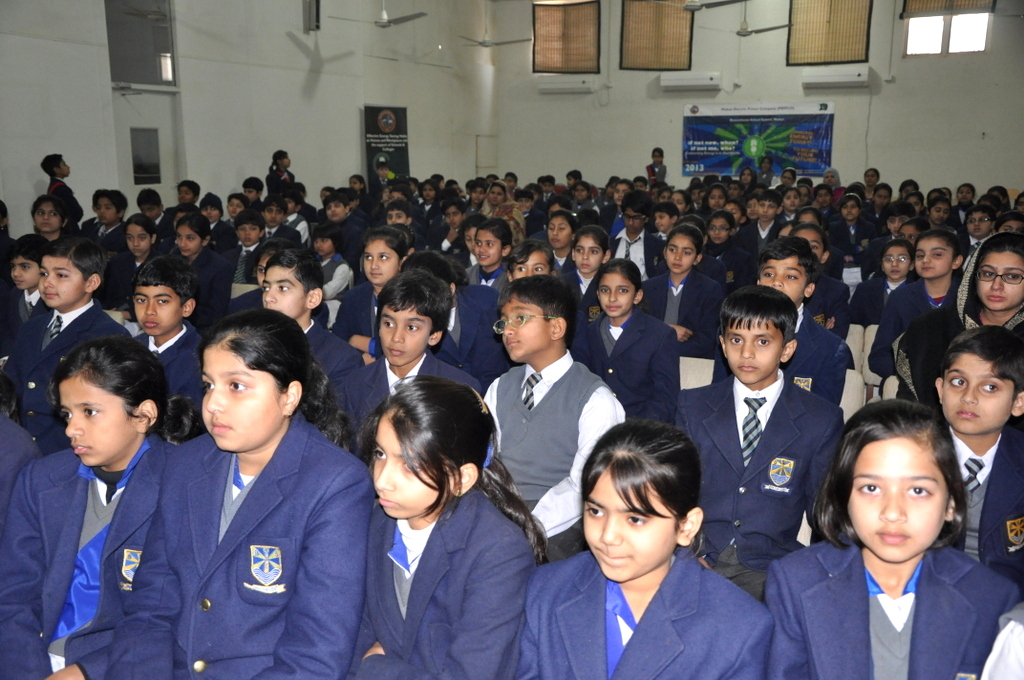
Beaconhouse Students

The first Beaconhouse school, Les Anges Montessori Academy, opened in Lahore, Pakistan, in 1975. Since then, Beaconhouse has established over 146 private schools in more than 30 cities across Pakistan. These institutions collectively provide preschool education, primary education, secondary education and preparation for the international General Certificate of Education (GCE) and local Secondary School Certificate (SSC) examinations.

Beaconhouse operates campuses for students of varying ages in the following Pakistani cities: [Bahria enclave] Abbottabad, Bahawalpur, Faisalabad, Gujranwala, Gujrat, Hafizabad, Islamabad, Jhang, Jhelum, Karachi, Kharian, Lahore, Mandi Bahauddin, Mardan, Mirpur, Multan, Nowshera, Okara, Peshawar, Hyderabad, Quetta, Rahim Yar Khan, Rawalpindi, Sadiqabad, Sahiwal, Sargodha, Sheikhupura, Sialkot, Sukkur, and Wah Cantonment.

Beaconhouse has also helped fund or manage several other educational programs in Pakistan:

- The Educators, a separate private school network
- TNS Beaconhouse, the first school in Pakistan to embrace the Reggio Emilia approach
- Gymboree Play and Music, an international franchise of play centers for which Beaconhouse is Pakistan's franchisee
- The Early Years, a child development center in Lahore, Pakistan
- Bubbles, a playgroup programme developed by Beaconhouse, offered at selected schools
- The Discovery Center Smart School in Karachi, Pakistan
- Beaconhouse National University, a private liberal arts university in Lahore, whose establishment was assisted by a US$6 million contribution from Beaconhouse.
- Concordia Colleges, a group of college campuses established in 2014 in several cities in Pakistan

=== United Kingdom ===
Headquartered in London, Beaconhouse Educational Services Limited, or BESL, was set up by Beaconhouse as a school management company. It also serves as a holding company for Beaconhouse schools in Asia and the Middle East. BESL manages the conceptualisation and construction of start-up schools, the acquisition of existing schools, and day-to-day school operations.

BESL currently owns and operates the following schools in the UK:

- Cherub Nurseries and Preschools: Based in Yorkshire, England, Cherub is a group of three nurseries and preschools within half an hour of each other. The Cherub group was established in 1976.
- Pocklington Montessori Nursery: Pocklington Montessori Nursery is also based in Pocklington Yorkshire.
- Newlands School: Acquired by BESL in July 2009, Newlands School is an independent, coeducational day and boarding school set on a 21-acre property in Seaford, East Sussex. The school caters to students from prep school through sixth form. In 2011, following its acquisition of Newlands UK, Beaconhouse introduced the Newlands UK Activity Programme for Classes VI to X, giving Beaconhouse students the opportunity to attend two and six-week residential trips to Newlands School.

=== Malaysia ===
The Beaconhouse School System was the first Pakistani education system to cross borders to Malaysia. Beaconhouse Malaysia Sdn Bhd was established in 2004 to operate schools in Malaysia. Beaconhouse owns eleven schools in Malaysia, all of them in or around Kuala Lumpur. Of these, seven are preschools and four – Sekolah Sri Inai, Sri Lethia, Sri Murni and Beaconhouse-Newlands Kuala Lumpur – are primary and secondary schools.

=== Philippines ===
In late 2005, Beaconhouse acquired Dame Theresiana de Montealegre School, a private school based in Manila, Philippines, that offers English-medium education to over 200 students in an upper-middle income suburb of the city. Beaconhouse acquired a second school, St Paul Learning Center, in Cebu City, the second largest city in the Philippines. In early 2010, Beaconhouse International Schools entered into a partnership with Angels in Heaven School, a prestigious international school in Cabuyao, Laguna, south of Manila. Divided over two campuses located close to each other, the school caters to students at kindergarten, elementary and high school level and actively participates in activities organised with other nearby schools, such as Brent.

=== Thailand ===
In 2014, Beaconhouse entered a partnership with the Yamssard School Group, which subsequently became known as the Beaconhouse Yamsaard Schools Group. The enterprise includes three bilingual schools, and one international school. The bilingual schools, BYS Ladprao in Bangkok, BYS Rangsit in Pathum Thani, and BYS Hua Hin, offer a mix of local and premium English programmes to a predominantly Thai market, with the premium programmes being offered at an international standard. Beaconhouse International School (BYIS) is a purpose-built international school catering to the expatriate community in Bangkok. Built on a 3-acre (1.2 ha) site close to the centre of Bangkok, BYIS currently caters to children aged 2 to 11, with plans to go up to senior school.

=== Indonesia ===
In 2010 Beaconhouse completed a strategic partnership with the SIS Group of Schools, comprising the popular Singapore International Schools (SIS) and its other national plus (private) schools. The Group has close to 3,000 students.

=== Bangladesh ===
The first branch of Beaconhouse in Bangladesh commenced its first academic year in August 2006 and relocated from Gulshan to Banani, a neighbourhood in Dhaka.

=== Oman ===
Beaconhouse established its first school in Muscat, Oman, in September 2006. This school has been established through Al-Kanz Education, a joint venture between Beaconhouse UK (which owns majority shares) and a local Omani group.

=== UAE ===
In 2009 Beaconhouse acquired the Gulf Nursery in Sharjah. The same year the Group also entered into a public–private partnership with the Abu Dhabi Education Council (ADEC) to improve the general performance of a cluster of government schools, with particular emphasis on ensuring significant improvement in students' achievement in English, mathematics and science. From September 2017, Beaconhouse Newlands school was commencing its operations in Al-Warqa, Midriff area in Dubai. The school offers the National Curriculum for England culminating in the UK qualifications IGCSE and A Levels.

== TBT Online ==
Launched towards the end of 2011, The Beaconhouse Times Online is an interactive news portal developed by Mudassir Ali that connects the Beaconhouse community, including parents, across 9 countries.

== Alumni ==
- Noorena Shams, International squash player, graduate of Beaconhouse Frontier Corps Campus Peshawar.
- Mir Zafar Ali, a graduate of Beaconhouse Cambridge Branch, Karachi is a visual effects specialist. Ali was the Technical Director of the team that won an Oscar for best visual effects in 2007 for the movie The Golden Compass.
- Sajal Aly, actress, graduated from Beaconhouse Lahore.
- Ayesha Omar, actress, graduated from Beaconhouse Lahore.
- Sana Askari, a TV personality and model graduated from Beaconhouse Gulshan Campus, Karachi
- Kamran Akmal, a Pakistani cricketer, graduated from Beaconhouse, Lahore
- Umar Akmal, a Pakistani cricketer, graduated from Beaconhouse, Lahore
- Salman Butt, a Pakistani cricketer, graduated from Beaconhouse Garden Town, Lahore
- Nadia Hussain, one of Pakistan's supermodels, was a student at Beaconhouse Defence Campus, Karachi.
- Hassan Sheheryar Yasin, Pakistani fashion designer graduated from Beaconhouse Defence Campus, Lahore.
- Ali Zafar, Pakistani actor, model and singer graduated from Beaconhouse Defence Campus, Lahore.
