= Federal Directorate of Education =

Pakistani government agency

- وفاقی نظامتِ تعلیم

Agency overview
- Formed: 1967; 59 years ago
- Jurisdiction: Pakistan
- Website: Federal Directorate of Education

Federal Directorate of Education (FDE) Islamabad (Urdu: وفاقی نظامتِ تعلیم) is a Pakistani government agency that oversees the public schools in the Islamabad Capital Territory (ICT).

The Federal Directorate of Education (FDE) was previously known as the Directorate of Central Government Educational Institutions. It was established in 1967 as an attached department of the Ministry of Education to administer the educational institutes of Rawalpindi and Islamabad. It had been working under the administrative control of the Capital Administration & Development Division (CA&DD). Now FDE is run by the Ministry of Federal Education and Professional Training.

== Functions ==
As of 26 July 2024, FDE oversees 432 schools in ICT with over 243,000 students from prep to post-graduate level. It employs 9663 Teaching and 4423 supporting staff.

== Educational Institutions under FDE ==
Category of Institutions	Urban			Sub Total	Rural			Sub Total	Total
Category of Institutions	Boys	Girls	Co-Ed	Urban	Boys	Girls	Co-Ed	Rural	Total
TOTAL IMSs Primary, Middle & High	21	33	62	116	132	135	8	275	391
IMCs / (F.G. Colleges) (HSSC to Postgraduation)	04	04	0	08	01	03	0	04	12
Islamabad Model Colleges (Prep to Postgraduation)	10	09	0	19	0	01	0	01	20
Total Institutions	35	47	62	144	133	138	08	279	423

== Enrollment of Institutions ==
S.No	SECTOR	Prep	Primary	Middle	Secondary	Up to Post Graduate	Total
1	URBAN 1	2366	15816	9957	5277	1204	34620
2	URBAN II	0	15873	8945	5507	562	30887
3	TARNOL	1612	12585	6305	2900	130	23532
4	BARA KAHU	0	10860	7148	3626	470	22104
5	NILORE	0	12112	7270	3916	1184	24482
6	SIHALA	0	14719	7129	3574	550	25972
Sub Total		3978	81965	46754	24800	4100	161597
7	FG Colleges	0	0	0	0	16391	16391
8	Islamabad Model Colleges	1057	14105	12224	7749	7728	42863
TOTAL		5035	96070	58978	32549	28219	220851
