= List of women's colleges =

A women's college is an institution of higher education where enrollment is all-female. In the United States, almost all women's colleges are private undergraduate institutions, with many offering coeducational graduate programs. In other countries, laws and traditions vary.

== Africa ==
=== Nigeria ===
- Tazkiyah university, Kaduna.(est. 2026)

=== Somaliland ===
- Barwaaqo University, Baliga cas, Somaliland (est. 2017)

=== Sudan ===
- Ahfad University for Women, Omdurman
- Sudan University College for Women, Khartoum

=== Zimbabwe ===
- Women's University in Africa, Harare (co-ed since unknown, Wikipedia page lists enrollment policy as 80% women and 20% men)

== Asia ==
=== Bangladesh ===
- Asian University for Women, Chittagong

=== China ===
- China Women's University, Beijing
- Shandong Women's University, Jinan
- Hunan Women's University, Changsha
- Ginling Women's University, Nanjing (renamed Ginling College in 1927 and merged with the University of Nanking in 1951)
- Guangdong Women's Polytechnic College, Guangzhou
- Zhejiang Women's College, Hangzhou
- Hebei Women's Vocational College, Shijiazhuang
- Fujian Hwa Nan Women's College, Fuzhou

=== India ===
- Sophia Girl's College (Autonomous), Ajmer
- Mody University of Science and Technology
- Lady Shri Ram College
- Miranda House
- Lady Hardinge Medical College
- Indira Gandhi Delhi Technical University for Women
- Women's College, Aligarh Muslim University
- Assam Women's University
- Bhagat Phool Singh Mahila Vishwavidyalaya
- Banasthali University
- Jayoti Vidyapeeth Women's University
- Karnataka State Women's University
- Mother Teresa Women's University
- Rama Devi Women's University
- SNDT Women's University
- Sri Padmavati Mahila Visvavidyalayam
- Avinashilingam Institute for Home Science and Higher Education for Women
- Gargi college for women
- MKSSS, Maharshi Karve Stree Shikshan Samstha, Pune
- Bethune College
- Lady Brabourne College
- Shri Shikshayatan College
- Gokhale Memorial Girls' College
- East Calcutta Girl's College
- Diamond Harbour Women's University
- Kanyashree University
- Maitreyi College, University of Delhi

=== Indonesia ===
- International Women University, Bandung
- Mahad Aisyah binti Abu Bakar Li al-Dakwah, Bogor

=== Kazakhstan ===
Kazakh National Women's Teacher Training University

=== Pakistan ===
==== Azad Kashmir ====
- Women University of Azad Jammu & Kashmir in Bagh, Azad Kashmir

==== Balochistan ====
- Sardar Bahadur Khan Women's University in Quetta

==== Islamabad Capital Territory ====
- Women's Institute of Science & Humanities in Islamabad

==== Khyber Pakhtunkhwa ====
===== Peshawar =====
- Jinnah College for Women in Peshawar
- Shaheed Benazir Bhutto Women University in Peshawar

===== Mardan =====
- Women University Mardan in Mardan

===== Swabi =====
- Women University Swabi in Swabi

===== Bahawalpur =====
- Government Sadiq College Women University in Bahawalpur

===== Faisalabad =====
- Government College Women University Faisalabad in Faisalabad

===== Lahore =====
- Fatima Jinnah Medical University in Lahore
- Kinnaird College for Women University in Lahore
- Lahore College for Women University in Lahore
- University of Home Economics in Lahore

===== Multan =====
- Women University Multan in Multan

===== Rawalpindi =====
- Fatima Jinnah Women University in Rawalpindi
- Rawalpindi Women University in Rawalpindi

===== Sialkot =====
- Government College Women University Sialkot in Sialkot

==== Sindh ====
===== Karachi =====
- Jinnah University for Women in Karachi
- Rana Liquat Ali Khan Government College of Home Economics - (RLAK)
- Khatoon-e-Pakistan Government College for Women
- BAMM PECHS Government College for Women
- DHA Degree College for Women
- Government Degree Girls College, North Karachi
- All Pakistan Women Association (APWA) Government College for Women
- Government Elementary College of Education in Karachi

===== Sukkur =====
- Begum Nusrat Bhutto Women University in Sukkur

=== Philippines ===
- Philippine Women's University (co-ed since unknown)
- Miriam College (since 1999)
- Assumption College San Lorenzo

=== South Korea ===
- Duksung Women's University
- Dongduk Women's University
- Ewha Womans University
- Kwangju Women's University
- Seoul Women's University
- Sookmyung Women's University
- Sungshin Women's University
- Baewha Women's University
- Busan Women's College
- Hanyang Women's University
- Kyung-in Women's University
- Seoul Women's College of Nursing
- Soongeui Women's College
- Suwon Women's University

Former

- Hansung Woman's University, Seoul (co-ed since 1978)
- Soodo Women Teachers' College, Seoul (co-ed and renamed Sejong university since 1979)
- Sangmyung Women's University, Seoul (co-ed since 1996)
- Songsim Women's College, Bucheon (merged with Catholic College in 1995; co-ed since 1995)
- Hyosung Women's College, Daegu (merged with Catholic College of Daegu in 1995; co-ed since 1995)
- Armed Forces Nursing Academy, Daejeon (co-ed since 2012)

== Europe ==
=== United Kingdom ===
==== England ====
- Bedford College, University of London (co-ed since 1965; merged with Royal Holloway in 1985)
- Girton College, University of Cambridge (co-ed since 1979)
- Lady Margaret Hall, University of Oxford, Oxford (co-ed since 1979)
- Lucy Cavendish College, University of Cambridge (co-ed since 2020)
- Murray Edwards College, University of Cambridge (mixed-sex Fellowship)
- Newnham College, University of Cambridge
- Royal Holloway, University of London (co-ed since 1965; merged with Bedford College in 1985)
- Hughes Hall, University of Cambridge (co-ed since 1973)
- Somerville College, University of Oxford (co-ed since 1994)
- St Aidan's College, Durham University, Durham (co-ed since 1981)
- St Anne's College, University of Oxford (co-ed since 1979)
- St Hilda's College, University of Oxford (co-ed since 2008)
- St Hild's College, Durham University (co-ed since merged with the College of the Venerable Bede in 1975)
- St Hugh's College, University of Oxford (co-ed since 1986)
- St Mary's College, Durham University (co-ed since 2005)
- Trevelyan College, Durham University (co-ed since 1992)
- Westfield College, University of London, Hampstead (1882: co-ed since 1968; merged with Queen Mary's College in 1989)
- Queen Elizabeth College, London (co-ed since 1953; merged with King's College London in 1985)
- Hillcroft College, Surbiton (1920: as the National Residential College for Women; co-ed since merger to form Richmond and Hillcroft Adult Community College in 2017)

==== Scotland ====
- Edinburgh School of Medicine for Women, Edinburgh (1886: closed in 1898)
- Edinburgh College of Medicine for Women, Edinburgh (1889: co-ed since merger with main medical schools in 1916)

== North America ==
=== Canada ===
==== Nova Scotia ====
- Mount Saint Vincent University, Halifax (co-ed since 1967)

==== Ontario ====
- Brescia University College, London (affiliated with the co-educational University of Western Ontario)
- Ewart College, Toronto (merged with Knox College of the University of Toronto in 1990)

== Middle East ==
=== Iran ===
- Alzahra University, Tehran
- Refah University College, Tehran

=== Saudi Arabia ===
All universities in Saudi Arabia must have a separate campus for women. Men are not allowed to study or work at female campuses, with the exception of King Abdullah University of Science and Technology. There is one women's university, without a male campus, which is:

- Princess Nora bint Abdul Rahman University

=== United Arab Emirates ===
- Abu Dhabi Women's College, Abu Dhabi
- Al Ain Women's College, Al Ain
- Dubai Women's College, Dubai
- Fujairah Women's College, Fujairah
- Ras Al Khaimah Women's College, Ras Al Khaimah
- Sharjah Women's College, Sharjah
- Zayed University, Abu Dhabi and Dubai
- Dubai Medical College for Girls
- Dubai Pharmacy College

== Oceania ==
=== Australia ===
==== New South Wales ====
- The Women's College, University of Sydney

==== Queensland ====
- Women's College, University of Queensland, St Lucia
- Duschesne College, University of Queensland, St Lucia
- Grace College, University of Queensland, St Lucia (co-ed since 2022)

==== Victoria ====
- St Hilda's College, University of Melbourne (co-ed since 1973)
- University College, University of Melbourne (co-ed since 1975)

== South America ==
=== Peru ===
- UNIFE, Universidad Femenina del Sagrado Corazón in Lima
