= List of educational institutions in Sahiwal =

This is a list of educational institutions located in the district of Sahiwal in Pakistan.

== Primary and secondary educational institutions & Colleges ==
- University of Sahiwal
- Sahiwal Medical College
- Punjab College of Science
- The Superior College
- Quaid-e-Azam College of Engineering and Technology, Sahiwal,
- CFE Group of Colleges
- Army Public Schools & Colleges System
- Govt High School 82-6/R Sahiwal
- Beaconhouse School System
- Bloomfield Hall School
- The City School
- Divisional Public School and College
- The Educators
- Govt High School Urban Area Sahiwal
- Maarifa College
