= University of Home Economics =

Home Economics University in Pakistan

- Motto in English: Empowering Women, Transforming Futures
- Type: Public women's university
- Established: 1955
- Affiliations: Punjab HEC
- Chancellor: Governor of Punjab
- Vice-Chancellor: Prof. Zaib-un-nisa Hussain
- Pro-Chancellor: Higher Education Minister
- Students: 3500
- Location: Lahore, Punjab, Pakistan
- Campus: Urban, Gulberg II
- Website: https://www.uhe.edu.pk

The University of Home Economics Lahore is a public women's university, located in Lahore, Punjab, Pakistan, under the Government of Punjab. It was founded in 1955 as the College of Home Economics to create a center for teaching and research in Home Economics and multiple emerging fields for women. It is one of the few women's universities in Lahore.

On 8 February 2017, Punjab assembly passed the bill to upgrade it from college to university. However, it started functioning as a university when Prof. Dr. Kanwal Ameen joined the university as a vice-chancellor in 2019, holding office from 31 May 2019 to May 2023. The Governor of Punjab serves as the chancellor of the university, while the Minister of Education serves as the Pro-chancellor. The current vice chancellor of the university is Prof. Zaib-un-nisa Hussain, a professor of the University of Punjab, joining the University of Home Economics on February 27, 2025.

== Degree programs ==
The university has HEC recognition. It offers FA (Home Economics) FSc. (Pre-Medical). The University has five major faculties, Social and Behavioral Sciences, Management Sciece, Arts & Design, Languages and History, and Science and Technology.

The 3rd Syndicate of the university has approved BS (4 years) programs in Human Nutrition & Dietetics, Textile Design, Fashion Design, Human Development & Family Studies, Sociology, Art & Design, Interior Design, Hospitality & Tourism Management, and Home Economics. MS (2 years) degree programs in Food & Nutrition, Textile & Clothing, Human Development & Family Studies, Art & Design, and MS Interior Design.

The Vice Chancellor, Dr. Faleeha Zahra Kazmi also initiated the Department of Computer Science & Information Technology in 2024. The university also offers graduate and post-graduate diplomas and short courses. Its own selected MPhil programs started from 2020 and PhD from 2021.

== See also ==
- Government College of Home Economics
- List of colleges in Pakistan
