= Rana Sikandar Hayat =

Pakistani politician

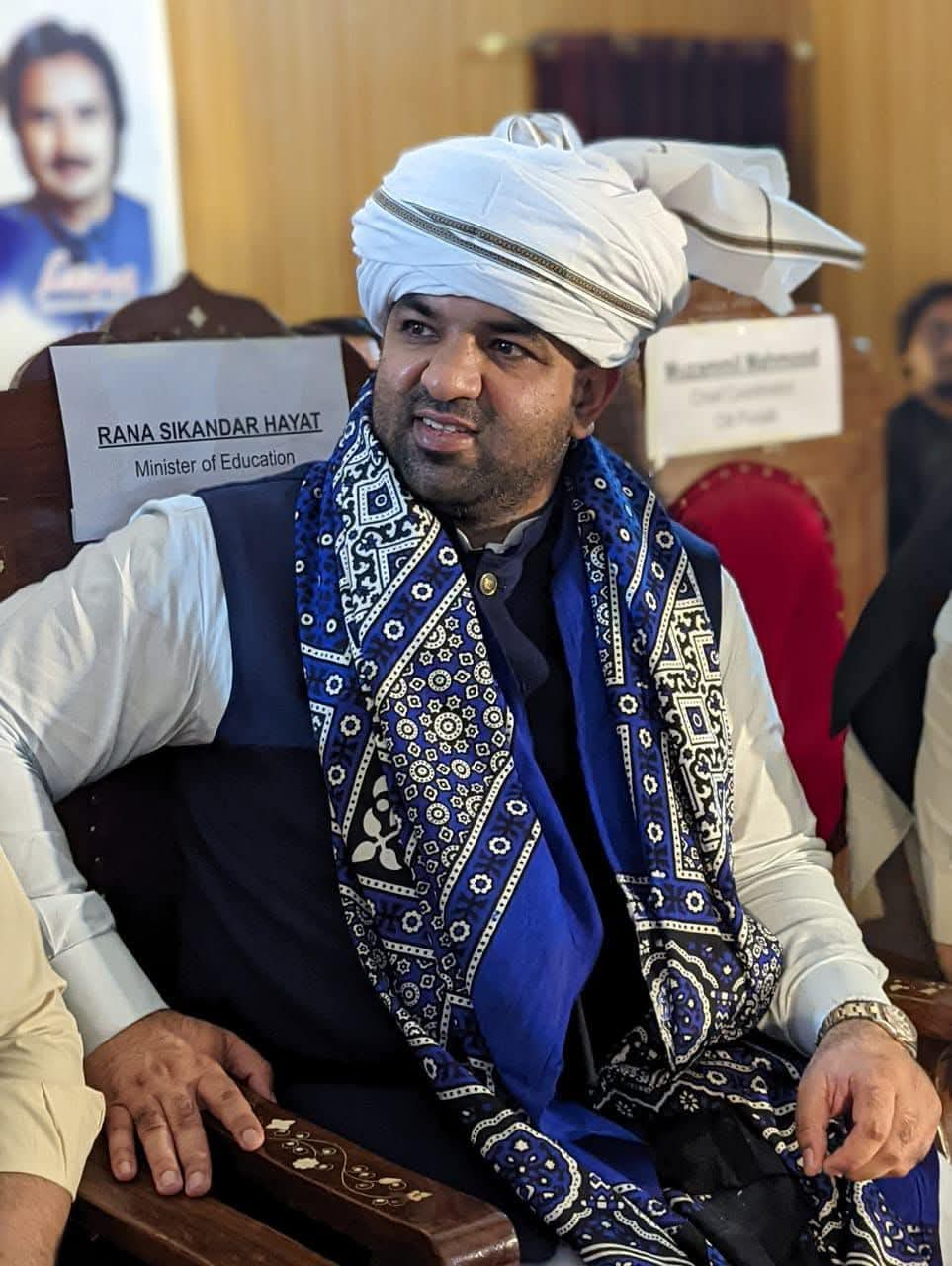

Provincial Minister of School and Higher Education for Punjab
- Incumbent
- Assumed office 6 March 2024

Member of the Provincial Assembly of the Punjab
- Incumbent
- Assumed office 24 February 2024
- Constituency: PP-183 Kasur-IX

Chairman District Council of Kasur (Mayor)
- In office May 2015 – May 2017

Personal details
- Born: 18 February 1987 (age 39) Phool Nagar, Pakistan
- Party: PMLN (2015-present)
- Parent: Rana Muhammad Hayat (father)
- Education: University of Toronto; Aitchison College
- Website: rs-hayat.com

Rana Sikandar Hayat is a Pakistani politician who is currently serving as the Provincial Minister of School and Higher Education for Punjab in the Cabinet of Maryam Nawaz. He has also been a Member of the Provincial Assembly of the Punjab since 2024.

== Political career ==
He was elected as chairman district council Kasur in the 2015 Punjab local government elections. When he assumed the charge of Chairman Kasur was at 17th number in Punjab in terms of education. After two years Kasur became the best district all over Punjab in terms of education. He was elected to the Provincial Assembly of the Punjab from Constituency PP-183 Kasur-IX as a candidate of Pakistan Muslim League (N) (PML-N) in the 2024 Pakistani general election.

On 6 March, he was inducted into the provincial cabinet of Punjab Chief Minister Maryam Nawaz and was appointed as Provincial Minister of Punjab for School Education and Literacy & Non-formal Basic Education.
