= Maryam Nawaz provincial government =

Provincial cabinet of Punjab, Pakistan, since 2024

- Cabinet of Punjab, Pakistan
- 2024-Present
- Date formed: 6 March 2024

People and organisations
- Governor: Sardar Saleem Khan; Baligh Ur Rehman
- Chief Minister: Maryam Nawaz
- Senior Minister: Marriyum Aurangzeb (De facto)
- No. of ministers: 19 Cabinet Ministers
- Total no. of members: 20
- Member parties: PMLN PPP PML(Q); PML(Z); PSP; JUP-N; MQM-P; NP; BAP; PTI-P; IND; ITP
- Status in legislature: Provincial Assembly of the Punjab 305 / 371 (82%)
- Opposition party: SIC; TLP; MWM; JIP; PHRP; PTI; AP; JUI (F); PART; ST; MQM-L; ANP
- Opposition leader: Muhammad Moeen Ud Din Riaz

History
- Election: 2024 Punjab provincial election
- Legislature term: 5 years
- Predecessor: Mohsin Naqvi government (Caretaker government)

The Maryam Nawaz provincial government is the Provincial Cabinet of Punjab, Pakistan headed by the present Chief Minister of Punjab, Maryam Nawaz. The oath-taking ceremony of Maryam as Chief Minister was held on 25 February 2024 during Pakistani political unrest amid widespread allegations of rigging in the 2024 Pakistani general election in her part's favour. The 18-member cabinet ministers took oath on 6 March.

Marriyum Aurangzeb was given senior minister status, virtually making her the deputy chief minister of Punjab. Reportedly, due to Maryam Nawaz's lack of parliamentary experience, Aurangzeb, instead of being assigned to the Federal Government, was transferred to the Punjab government to assist Maryam in handling the provincial government's affairs. This also caused a stir among the PML-N MPAs in Punjab Assembly.

Reportedly, Maryam's father Nawaz Sharif whom Maryam also referred to as her mentor, endorsed the selection of cabinet ministers, .

== History ==
=== Inauguration ===
Provincial elections were held in Punjab on 8 February 2024 to elect 18th Provincial Assembly of the Punjab. Pakistan Muslim League (N) (PML-N) won 137 out of total 297 direct seats in the Punjab Assembly. Later, 23 independent candidates who won direct seats also joined PML-N.

On 26 February 2024, Senior Vice President of PML-N and MPA Maryam Nawaz was elected by the PML-N legislative members as their leader in the assembly and later, the same day she took oath as the Chief Minister in the Punjab government in a public ceremony in Lahore. On 6 March, an 18-member provincial cabinet of Chief Minister Maryam, was sworn in. Maryam's relative Bilal Yasin was made the Minister for Food while her close associate Faisal Ayub Khokhar, was given the portfolio of the Sports Affairs ministry.

She also appointed three ministers from her uncle Shahbaz Sharif’s third provincial Punjab cabinet namely, Khawaja Imran Nazir, Khawaja Salman Rafique, and Mian Mujtaba Shuja-ur-Rehman. The cabinet comprised two female ministers; Marriyum Aurangzeb and Azma Bukhari, and two ministers from Non-Muslim community; Khalil Tahir Sandhu and Ramesh Singh Arora.

== Major initiatives ==
Shortly after assuming office as Chief Minister, Maryam announced the establishment of first public cancer hospital to be built in Lahore. She launched various initiatives such as Ramadan Nigehban (Guardian Ramadan) Package to deliver essential food items to the needy people before the start of Ramadan, Suthra Punjab (Clean Punjab) campaign to cleanup whole of Punjab within a month, Sarkain Bahal Punjab Khushhaal project to construct, repair and rehabilitate roads in Punjab, Never Again to eliminate violence against women, and Apni Chat Apna Ghar project to provide homes for the poor.

On 11 March, she approved the procurement of 657 environment-friendly buses for the urban areas of Punjab and 20,000 electric bikes. These 20,000 e-bikes were intended for students on "easy" installment plans. On 12 March, she approved the construction of 21-storey Arfa Karim Tower-II as well setting up 516 free Wi-Fi points in Lahore. On 12 March, the Punjab Emergency Services Department announced plans to launch an air ambulance service in Punjab, a project proposed by Maryam.

On 18 March, the Punjab cabinet, chaired by Maryam Nawaz, presented its inaugural budget of Rs4,480 billion for a specific period of three months (April to June) for the fiscal year 2023-24. Questions were raised over how Nawaz Sharif, a National Assembly member without any official position in the provincial or federal government, could preside over the administrative meetings of the Punjab government and issue directives. Despite lacking an official role, it was widely perceived that he was heavily influential in major decision-making processes. Subsequently, a petition was lodged in the Lahore High Court against Nawaz Sharif for presiding over three consecutive administrative meetings of the provincial government.

On 5 April, Maryam announced plans for the establishment of a transgender school at the division level in Punjab and has directed the relevant authorities to ensure the provision of educational facilities for special children in at least one government school within each district of Punjab.

Under the ministry, the Punjab Dhee Rani Programme was launched, which aims to help underprivileged families, with marriage financial aid and bridal gifts. She has also introduced the CM Punjab Free Solar Panel Scheme to provide free solar panels to households, helping them reduce electricity costs. Furthermore, the CM Maryam Nawaz Laptop Scheme 2025 is set to distribute 50,000 laptops to students, helping them access technology for their studies. In the field of sports, she has supported the Khelta Punjab Games 2025, which encourages youth participation in sports, with winners receiving E-bikes. Additionally, her government is constructing a school for children with autism, which is a step toward inclusive education. On 9 February 2025, She inaugurated the 2025 National Horse and Cattle show. The event is designed as a family festival featuring culture, literature, and Punjab's vibrant traditions. According to Maryam Aurangzeb, 80 local and 14 national teams will participate, making it a grand national celebration.

On 15 February 2025, Maryam Nawaz Sharif, inaugurated the Green Agri Mall and Service Company in the Cholistan Desert as part of the Green Pakistan Initiative, launched in collaboration with the Pakistan Army. The initiative, introduced in 2023, aims to convert uncultivated government lands into productive agricultural fields to enhance food security and promote sustainable farming practices. The inauguration ceremony was attended by General Syed Asim Munir, Chief of Army Staff, along with other government officials and local farmers. The facility aims to provides high-quality seeds, fertilizers, pesticides, and rental services for modern farming machinery, including drones, at controlled rates. It also includes a 5,000-acre Smart Agri Farm and an Agricultural Research and Facilitation Centre to offer technical support and advanced agricultural solutions. These developments aim to revolutionize agriculture in the region, ensuring food security and improving farmers' livelihoods in 2025 and beyond.

In April 2025, Punjab Chief Minister Maryam Nawaz Sharif had given formal approval for the launch of Air Punjab, the province's first-ever airline project, marking a major milestone in Punjab's transport and aviation ambitions.

In August 2025, the School Nutrition Programme pilot initiative was launched, aimed at improving the nutritional status of children enrolled in government schools and addressing malnutrition among students in underserved areas. The programme provides daily nutritional supplements, including milk and biscuits, to students during school hours, with the objective of improving health outcomes, increasing school attendance, and enhancing learning capacity by ensuring access to basic nutrition. The pilot phase was launched across eight districts (Bhakkar, Bahawalnagar, Dera Ghazi Khan, Layyah, Rajanpur, Mianwali, Muzaffargarh, and Rahim Yar Khan) covering more than 400,000 students in over 3,500 government schools. According to officials, the programme also includes mechanisms for monitoring distribution and collecting empty milk packs for recycling, with proceeds allocated to participating schools, while broader oversight is intended to ensure transparency and consistent delivery of nutrition supplies. The initiative has been described by provincial authorities as part of wider education and health reforms in Punjab, alongside efforts to improve school infrastructure and learning environments, including the expansion of Punjab Education Endowment Fund (PEEF) Education Tech Schools to rural regions, launching an English-language pilot targeting 300,000 children, establishing 10,000 Early Childhood Education classrooms, increasing enrolment capacity at the Nawaz Sharif Center of Excellence, and initiating the construction of sanitation facilities in girls’ schools. Further measures include digital education and teacher training programmes, the establishment of 6,000 STEM laboratories, and province-wide improvements to school infrastructure, with the stated objective of raising government school standards above those of private institutions.

On 8 January 2026, Sharif inaugurated the distribution of Honorarium Cards for Imams of mosques in Lahore, Punjab, Pakistan. Under the Chief Minister Punjab Honorarium Card scheme, registered imams of approximately 70,000 mosques across the province are to receive a monthly stipend of 25,000 Pakistani rupees delivered through designated cards and bank accounts opened at the Bank of Punjab. The initiative, estimated to cost around 20 billion rupees annually, aims to provide financial support and recognition to mosque imams for their roles in religious guidance and community affairs. The first tranche of payments was planned to begin the following month, with digital card payments intended to enhance transparency and direct disbursement.

== List of Members of Cabinet ==
| Sr. No. | Name | Constituency | Portfolio | Assumed office | Party | Ref |
Chief Minister
| 1 | Maryam Nawaz (Chief Minister) | PP-159 (Lahore-XV) | All other portfolios | 26 February 2024 | PMLN | |
Ministers
| 2 | Muhammad Bilal Yamin | PP-6 Muree | 1. Planning and Development; 2. Environment Protection and Climate Change; 3. Forestry, Fisheries & Wildlife; 4. Chief Minister's Special Initiatives | 2 March 2026 | PMLN | |
| 3 | Mian Mujtaba Shuja-ur-Rehman | PP-148 (Lahore-IV) | Finance | 6 March 2024 | PMLN | |
| 4 | Ashiq Husain Khan | PP-186 (Okara-II) | Agriculture | 6 March 2024 | PMLN | |
| 5 | Kazim Ali Pirzada | PP-245 (Bahawalpur-I) | Irrigation | 6 March 2024 | PMLN | |
| 6 | Rana Sikandar Hayat | PP-183 (Kasur-IX) | School Education | 6 March 2024 | PMLN | |
| 7 | Khawaja Imran Nazir | PP-150 (Lahore-VI) | Primary & Secondary Health Care | 6 March 2024 | PMLN | |
| 8 | Khawaja Salman Rafique | PP-153 (Lahore-IX) | 1. Specialized Healthcare & Medical Education; 2. Punjab Emergency Services | 6 March 2024 | PMLN | |
| 9 | Zeeshan Rafiq | PP-51 (Sialkot-VIII) | Local Government and Community Development | 6 March 2024 | PMLN | |
| 10 | Bilal Akbar Khan | PP-58 (Narowal-V) | Transport and Mass Transit | 6 March 2024 | PMLN | |
| 11 | Sohaib Ahmad Malik | PP-71 (Sargodha-I) | Communication and Works | 6 March 2024 | PMLN | |
| 12 | Azma Bukhari | W-301 (Reserved seat for women) | Information and culture | 6 March 2024 | PMLN | |
| 13 | Bilal Yasin | PP-174 (Lahore-XXX) | Food | 6 March 2024 | PMLN | |
| 14 | Ramesh Singh Arora | NM-366 (Reserved seat for minorities) | Minorities Affairs | 6 March 2024 | PMLN | |
| 15 | Malik Iftikhar Ahmed | PP-14 (Rawalpindi-VIII) | 1. Human Rights | 11 October 2025 | PMLN | |
| 15 | Malik Iftikhar Ahmed | PP-14 (Rawalpindi-VIII) | 2. Parliamentary Affairs | 10 September 2025 | PMLN | |
| 16 | Faisal Ayub Khokhar | PP-168 (Lahore-XXIV) | Sports | 6 March 2024 | PMLN | |
| 17 | Shafay Hussain | PP-31 (Gujrat-V) | Industries, Commerce & Investment | 6 March 2024 | PML(Q) | |
| 18 | Sardar Sher Ali Gorchani | PP-293 (Rajanpur-II) | Mines & Minerals | 6 March 2024 | PMLN | |
| 19 | Sohail Shaukat Butt | PP-151 (Lahore-VII) | Bait-ul-Maal & Social Welfare | 6 March 2024 | PMLN | |

On March 19, Maryam Nawaz appointed Saima Farooq as her personal secretary, and Zeeshan Ashiq Malik was named special assistant for political matters, tasked with handling all political affairs on behalf of Maryam.

== Reception ==
Since no woman had occupied a top federal or provincial government position since the assassination of Benazir Bhutto in 2007, Maryam's candidacy for the position of Punjab Chief Minister was perceived as a notable development by some segments of the population. Her supporters argue that her election as Pakistan's first female chief minister symbolizes the overcoming of patriarchal norms and a step forward for gender equality in Pakistani politics. However, her critics argue that her rise to this position is mainly due to dynastic politics rather than her personal merit.

The Pakistan Tehreek-e-Insaf (PTI), the party that won the second-most seats in Punjab dismissed Maryam Nawaz's government as ‘unconstitutional’ and labelled Maryam herself as a ‘fake chief minister’ due to her being on a stolen mandate. PTI and opposition to Maryam has challenged her election as rigged. PTI has provided evidence claiming that it won the 2024 Punjab provincial election and defeated the PML (N), and they claim the results were changed to favor Maryam Nawaz. Maryam was also accused of only prioritizing the Sharif family’s wealth while in power. PTI said the Maryam ministry would ‘collapse under its own weight’ due it being formed on the basis of rigging. They also announced to establish a shadow cabinet in Punjab, tasked with overseeing the performance of the provincial government across various administrative departments. On 21 March Chief Minister of Khyber Pakhtunkhwa Ali Amin Gandapur demanded the resignations of the federal and Punjab governments, alleging electoral fraud in Maryam's appointment as Chief Minister. He labeled her government as illegitimate and urged her to respect the limits of her authority.

The Leader of the Opposition in the Provincial Assembly of the Punjab, Malik Ahmad Khan Bhachar stated that Chief Minister Maryam Nawaz was a ‘TikToker’ due to her bad governance policies. PTI leader and opposition politician in the National Assembly, Sher Afzal Marwat has accused Maryam Nawaz's government of hiring gunmen to assassinate him. Pakistani journalist Imran Riaz Khan has alleged that Maryam Nawaz was a key figure behind his arrest and said that she is being made the chief minister after stealing the people's votes.

In April 2024, following Maryam's accusation that Khyber Pakhtunkhwa was supplying metal kite strings to Punjab, PTI leaders condemned Maryam's remarks about Khyber Pakhtunkhwa and suggested that the Sharif family had a history of animosity towards the province.
