= UO =

UO may stand for:

== Arts and entertainment ==
- Call of Duty: United Offensive, an expansion pack for the popular first-person shooter computer game, Call of Duty
- Ultima Online, a graphical massively multiplayer online role-playing game
- Underoath, an American Christian metalcore band from Tampa, Florida
- Urge Overkill, an alternative rock band, formed in Chicago, United States

== Businesses and organizations ==
=== Businesses ===
- Universal Orlando, a theme park resort in Orlando, Florida
- Urban Outfitters, a publicly traded American company
- Hong Kong Express Airways (IATA code: UO), an airline based in Hong Kong

=== Universities ===
- University of Okara, a public university in Okara, Punjab, Pakistan
- University of Oregon, a public research university in Eugene, Oregon, USA
- University of Osnabrück, public university in Osnabrück, Lower Saxony, Germany
- University of Otago, a public university in Dunedin, New Zealand
- University of Oradea, a public university in Oradea, Romania
- University of Ottawa, a public university in Canada
- University of Oxford, a public university in United Kingdom

=== Other organizations ===
- Orthodox Union, a kosher certification service which places a "U inside O" logo on food packaging

== Other uses ==
- Unexploded ordnance, explosive weapons that did not explode when they were employed
- Urate oxidase, an enzyme that catalyzes the oxidation of uric acid to 5-hydroxyisourate

== See also ==
- U of O (disambiguation)
