= UOS =

UoS or UOS may refer to:

- Union of students, also known as students' union, a student organisation present at many universities
- Union of Salvation
- Unity Operating System or Unified Operating System, Chinese Linux Distribution
- United Opposition of Serbia (1990), a defunct coalition of opposition political parties in Serbia
- Franklin County Airport (Tennessee)

== Universities ==
=== Asia ===
- University of Sahiwal, a public university in Pakistan
- University of Sargodha, a public university in Pakistan
- University of Seoul, a public university in South Korea
- University of Sharjah, a university in United Arab Emirates
- University of Sindh, a public university in Pakistan

=== Europe ===
- University of Salford, a university in Northern England
- University of Sheffield, a university in Northern England
- University of Southampton, a university in Southern England
- University of Suffolk, a university in Eastern England
- University of Surrey, a university in Southeastern England
- University of Sussex, a university in Southern England
- University of Stuttgart, a university in Southern Germany

=== North America ===
- University of Saskatchewan, a Canadian coeducational public research university, founded in 1907
