= Digital Dera =

Agricultural initiative in Punjab, Pakistan

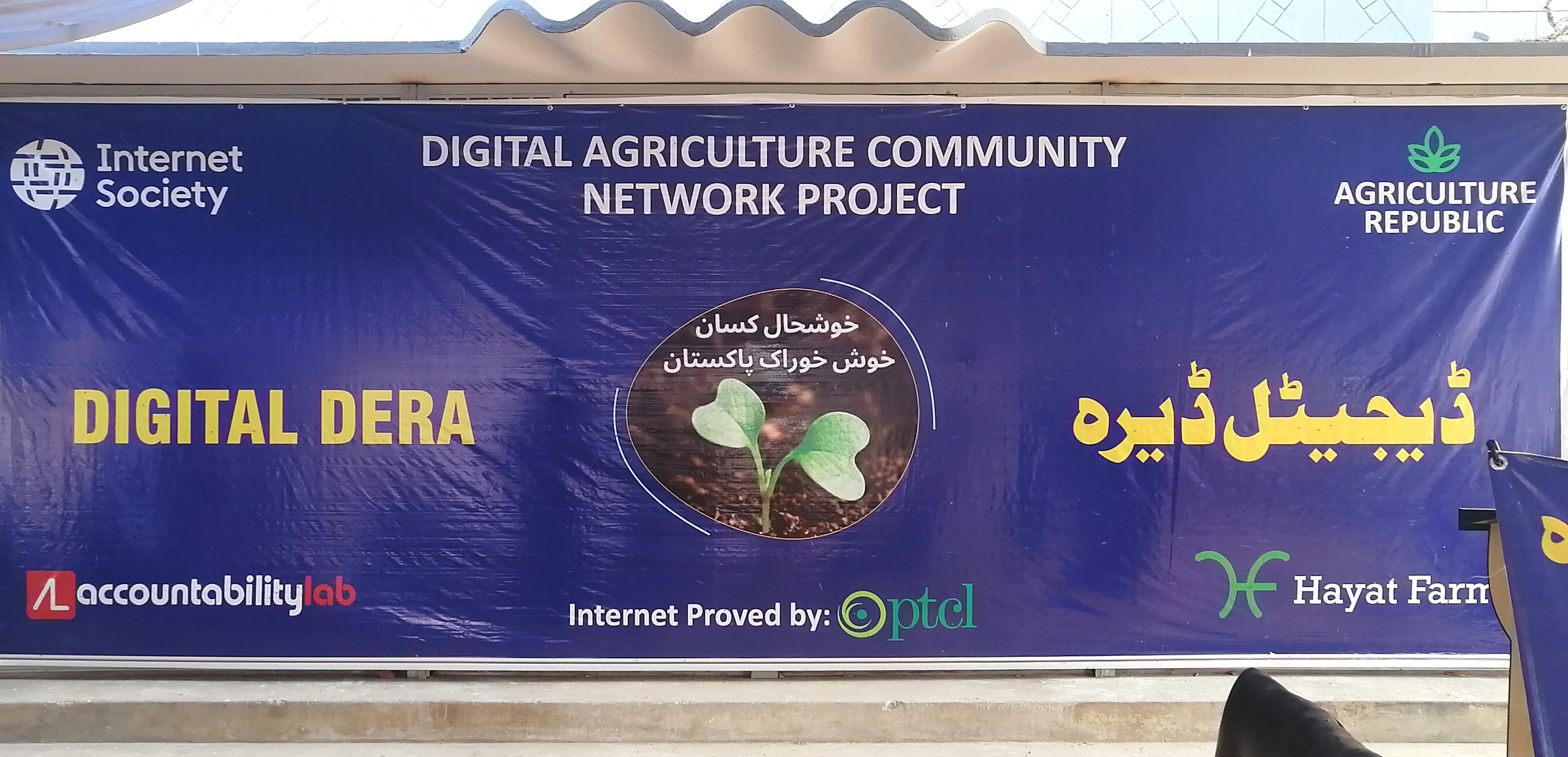
- Digital Dera Pakpattan
- Type of project: Free internet and open digital services for all farmers
- Country: Pakistan
- Status: Active

Digital Dera (ڈیجیٹل ڈیرہ) is an initiative to digitalize the agriculture sector in remote fertile lands of Punjab province of Pakistan by providing a community internet network to several hundred local farmers. It was established with the collaboration of Agriculture Republic, Internet Society, Accountability Lab, and PTCL. It aims to provide free internet connectivity for better access to digital agricultural resources. The future goal is to introduce agriculture-based smart villages through IoT integration.

== Background ==
A group of progressive agricultural entrepreneurs from Punjab who previously founded "Agriculture Republic", an agriculture Think Tank, started Digital Dera with NGOs' help and the support of Director General Agriculture (Punjab Agriculture Department). It is part of the "Digital Agriculture Community Network Project", targeting over 1,500 farmers in the rural areas of Punjab.

== Digital Hujra ==
"Digital Hujra" is another initiative to serve same purposes in Khyber Pakhtunkhwa province as "Digital Dera" is serving in Punjab province. Digital Hujra center is established in University of Malakand, Chakdara, Lower Dir District of Khyber Pakhtunkhwa. Experts in the center will provide necessary assistance to the surrounding villages such as Ramora, Ali Mast, Gul Muqam, Darbar and Sehsada in Adenzai Tehsil.

== See also ==
- Smart villages in Asia
- Agriculture in Pakistan
