= Ashiq Husain Khan =

Pakistani politician

Syed Ashiq Hussain Kirmani
- سید عاشق حسین کرمانی

Provincial Minister of Agriculture for Punjab
- Incumbent
- Assumed office 6 March 2024

Member of the Provincial Assembly of the Punjab
- Incumbent
- Assumed office 24 February 2024
- Constituency: PP-186 Okara-II

Member of the National Assembly of Pakistan
- In office 1 June 2013 – 31 May 2018
- Constituency: NA-145 (Okara-III)

Personal details
- Born: 27 August 1984 (age 42) Okara, Punjab, Pakistan
- Party: PMLN (2013-present)

Syed Ashiq Hussain Kirmani (Urdu: سید عاشق حسین کرمانی; born 27 August 1984) is a Pakistani politician from PML-N who is currently Provincial Minister of the Agriculture department for Punjab, Pakistan in the Maryam ministry. He is currently a member of the Provincial Assembly of the Punjab and had been a member of the National Assembly of Pakistan, from June 2013 to May 2018.

== Early life ==
He was born on 27 August 1984.

== Political career ==
He was elected to the National Assembly of Pakistan as a candidate of Pakistan Muslim League (N) (PML-N) from Constituency NA-145 (Okara-III) in the 2013 Pakistani general election. He received 89,025 votes and defeated an independent candidate, Rana Khizar Hayat Khan.

During his tenure as Member of the National Assembly, he served as the Federal Parliamentary Secretary for Railways.

In the 2024 General Elections, he was elected as member of the Punjab Assembly from PP-186 Okara-II as PML-N candidate. He defeated Syed Gulzar Husnain, an independent candidate supported by PTI and another IND candidate Rai Mushtaq Ahmad Kharal supported by former MPA and tv host Jugno Mohsin.
