= NA-145 =

NA-145 may refer to:

- Constituency NA-145, various constituencies in the National Assembly of Pakistan
- A variant of the Ryan Navion light aircraft
