= Faisal Ayub Khokhar =

Pakistani politician

Faisal Ayub Khokhar (born 18 April 1991 in Lahore) is a Pakistani politician and businessman who has been a member of the Provincial Assembly of the Punjab since 23 February 2024. He is the son of politician Malik Saif ul Malook Khokhar and the nephew of politician Afzal Khokhar. Since March 2024, Khokhar has been serving as Punjab’s Provincial Minister of Punjab for Sports Affairs and Energy Department in the Maryam Nawaz government.

== Political career ==
In December 2013, the Auditor General of Pakistan (AGP) declared Khokhar's appointment to the Board of Directors (BoD) of Lahore Electric Supply Company (LESCO) as "politically driven" due to significant conflicts of interest. Despite lacking experience in the power sector, Khokhar was nominated by the Government of Punjab as an independent director of LESCO BoDs while also holding office as a key member of PML-N, serving as the President of its Lahore-City Division chapter.

He was elected to the Provincial Assembly of the Punjab from Constituency PP-168 Lahore-XXIV as a candidate of Pakistan Muslim League (N) (PML-N) in the 2024 Pakistani general election.

On 6 March, he was inducted into the provincial cabinet of Punjab Chief Minister Maryam Nawaz and was appointed as Provincial Minister of Punjab for Sports Affairs.
