= Kanwal Ameen =

Pakistani professor of information management

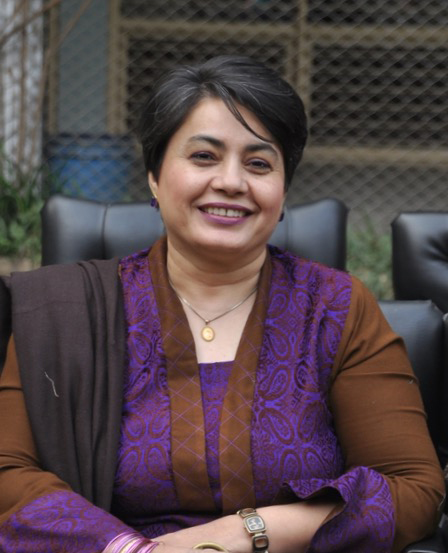
- Born: Lahore, Punjab, Pakistan
- Occupation: professor of information management
- Known for: Vice Chancellor, Government College Women University Faisalabad, academic leader, teacher and researcher, community development services in library and information science
- Spouse: Mohammad Zafarullah
- Children: Ali, Zain, Danyal
- Awards: 2023 Tamgha e Imtiaz; 2020 Women Excellence Award; Indigenous Post-Doctoral Supervision Award (2018-2019); 2010 Pakistan Library Association (PLA) Appreciation Award for Academic Achievement; 2010 HEC Best University Teacher Award; 2013 Asian Library Leader's Award

Academic background
- Education: PhD in library and information science
- Alma mater: University of the Punjab
- Thesis: Philosophy and Framework of Collection Management and Its Application in University Libraries in Pakistan: An Appraisal. (2005)
- Website: https://uhe.edu.pk/index.php/principals-message/

Kanwal Ameen (Urdu: کنول امین) is Professor Emeritus and vice chancellor of Government College Women University Faisalabad (2024-present) of Pakistan. She has served as the founding Vice-chancellor at the University of Home Economics (2019–2023). She is also Vice Chair, Board of Governors of the Punjab Library Foundation (2023–). Previously she served as Chairperson (2009–2018) of the Department of Information Management, Chairperson of Doctoral Programme Coordination Committee (2013–2017), University of the Punjab, and as Director of External Linkages. With a career spanning nearly four decades, she has made substantial contributions in teaching, research and academic leadership in Pakistan. Ameen has authored many publications and in internationally known scholar who has been honoured with several national and international awards, including Tamgha-e-Imtiaz by the government of Pakistan for her contributions in Education. Ameen continues to contribute to the academic community through her research, mentorship of post-graduate students, and serving on editorial boards of international journals.

Ameen has been serving as honorary secretary of Ali Zafar Foundation which is working on spreading digital literacy and education with a special focus on girls and helping economically marginalized communities.

== Education ==
Ameen attended the University of the Punjab and completed her education with a PhD in Library and Information Science in 2005. During her PhD she was awarded pre-doctoral Fulbright Scholarship (2000–2001) to attend School of Information,University of Texas, Austin. She again got a post-doctoral Fulbright Scholarship (2009-2010) to research at University of Missouri, Colombia. Formerly, she got a scholarship by the Netherlands government to attend a three-month diploma on library management at the city of Hague in 1993. She then worked as a lecturer at University of the Punjab from 1993 to 2004.

== Career ==
=== Teaching ===
She joined the department library and information science as lecturer in 1993. She became assistant professor in 2004 and was selected as professor in 2008. Ameen's teaching interests are in the areas of personality development, information services, information behaviour, qualitative research, information literacy, personal information management, and marketing of information services. She has produced many PhDs and MPhil students and introduced a number of new courses at graduate and postgraduate level. She got best teacher award by the Higher Education Commission of Pakistan in 2010.

=== Research ===
As of 2024, Ameen had published over 240 works. She has served as Secretary of the IFLA Discussion on Library & Information Science Education in Developing Countries. and was editor-in-chief of the Pakistan Journal of Information Management and Libraries (formerly Pakistan Journal of Library and Information Science) from 2005 to 2009. Currently, she is a member of the editorial advisory board of the Journal of Knowledge and Communication Management, Library Management, The Electronic Library, Collection and Curation, Pakistan Journal of Computer and Information Systems (PJCIS), and Journal of Information Management and Practices. Google Scholar shows her h-index as 32 and her i10-index as 92, indicating a significant influence in academic and research spheres.

=== Other ===
Ameen convened and supervised a committee to redesign Punjab University's official website. Made available in English and Urdu, the website was recognised for its accessibility by vice chancellor Mujahid Kamran, during a launching ceremony held in February 2016.

== Personal life ==
Ameen is the mother of Ali Zafar, a Pakistani actor and singer. In a 2010 interview with Abdul Samad Ansari, Ameen explained that she entered into an arranged marriage with her husband, Mohammad Zafarullah.

== Honours and awards ==
In 2010, Ameen received the Pakistan Library Association (PLA) Appreciation Award for Academic Achievement. That same year, she also received a Best University Teacher Award from the Higher Education Commission of Pakistan but the award carried added significance for Ameen as she was "the first-ever library information science professor to earn the honour." In 2013, Ameen received the Asian Library Leader's Award for Professional Excellence from the Satija Research Foundation for Library and Information Science, India. On 23rd March, 2024 she has been awarded with highest national award Hila-e-Imtiaz by Government of Pakistan.

== Selected works ==
Ameen has published in many forms, including books, journals, and conference papers. Following are a few of her published works:

- Ameen, Kanwal (2009). Philosophy and Framework of Collection Management: Its Application in University Libraries of Pakistan. Saarbrücken. p. 232. ISBN 978-3639203066.
- Ameen, Kanwal. (2020). "Graduate researchers' perceptions and expectations: An exploratory study about reference and information services." Reference Services Review, 48(2), 227-242. http://dx.doi.org/10.1108/RSR-02-2019-0009
- Arshad, Alia; Ameen, Kanwal (2011). User's Perception's and Expectations of Quality Library Services: A survey of University of the Punjab's libraries. Saarbrücken: VDM Publishing. p. 112. ISBN 978-3639319880.
- Ameen, Kanwal (ed.). Emerging Paradigm in Librarianship: A Call for Innovation (Proceedings of PLA Golden Jubilee International Conference). Lahore: Pakistan Library Association Punjab Branch. p. 176.
- Ameen, Kanwal; Warraich, Nosheen (eds.). Looking Back, Moving Forward (Proceedings of International Conference on Information Management and Libraries (ICIML) Lahore, Pakistan, November 10-13, 2015). Lahore: Department of Information Management, University of the Punjab. p. 650.
- Ameen, Kanwal; Batool, Hina; Naveed, Asif (2018). "Difficulties Novice LIS Researchers Face While Formulating a Research Topic". Information Development. 35 (4): 592–600. doi:10.1177/0266666918774875. S2CID 65060598.
- Ahsan Ullah; Ameen, Kanwal (2018). "Account of Methodologies and Methods Applied in LIS Research: A Systematic Review". Library and Information Science Research. 40 (1): 53–60. doi:10.1016/j.lisr.2018.03.002.
- Soroya, Saira; Ameen, Kanwal (2018). "What Do They Want? Millennials And Role of Libraries in Pakistan". The Journal of Academic Libraries. 44 (2): 248–255. doi:10.1016/j.acalib.2018.01.003.
- Rafiq, Muhammad; Ameen, Kanwal; Jabeen, Munazza (2018). "Barriers to Digitization in University Libraries of Pakistan: A Developing Country Perspective". The Electronic Library. 36 (3): 457–470. doi:10.1108/EL-01-2017-0012.
