= Punjab Education Foundation =

- بنیاد تعلیم پنجاب
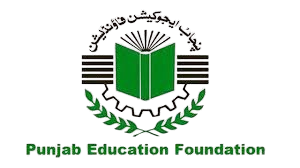
- Abbreviation: PEF
- Formation: 1991, Restructured in 2004
- Headquarters: Lahore, Punjab, Pakistan
- Region served: Punjab
- Website: pef.edu.pk

The Punjab Education Foundation (PEF) is an autonomous organization based in Lahore. It is governed by a 15-member board of directors, most of whom represent the private sector. Its mandate is to improve education for economically disadvantaged students through partnerships with private schools. It is funded by the Government of Punjab.

== History ==
The Punjab Education Foundation was established in 1991 through an act of Provincial Assembly of the Punjab and was restructured in 2004. Dr. Allah Bakhsh Malik UNESCO Confucius Laureate was appointed as the first MD/CEO of the organisation (2005-2008).

== Program ==
The Punjab Education Foundation's Assisted Schools Program utilizes the expanding network of private schools in Punjab to improve academic standards. About one-third of children aged 6 to 10 attending school are enrolled in private institutions, a proportion that continues to increase. The program's key components include vouchers, teacher training, and incentives for schools demonstrating improved academic outcomes.

The program's structure is designed to limit direct government administrative pressures and enable the introduction of specific management practices in its contractual arrangements with schools. To participate in the voucher system, schools must have at least two-thirds of students achieve a minimum score of 33 percent on an exam, as well as meet additional nonquantifiable criteria assessed by inspectors.

Performance-based incentives are provided at both the school and teacher levels. Schools with the highest pass rates receive financial rewards, and teachers in these schools may also receive direct monetary bonuses. Schools failing to meet academic, infrastructure, or teaching standards for three consecutive years are removed from the program.

== See also ==
- School education department (Punjab, Pakistan)
