= Government College Women University, Sialkot =

Public university in Punjab, Pakistan

Government College Women University Sialkot گورنمٹ کالج وؤمن یونیورسٹی سیالکوٹ
- Other names: GCWUS
- Motto: Service, Knowledge, Discipline
- Type: Public
- Established: 2012
- Accreditation: Higher Education Commission
- Chancellor: Governor of the Punjab
- Location: Sialkot, Punjab, Pakistan
- Website: gcwus.edu.pk

The Government College Women University Sialkot (GCWUS) (Urdu: گورنمٹ کالج وؤمن یونیورسٹی سیالکوٹ) is a public university located in Sialkot, Punjab, Pakistan.

== Recognized university ==
This university is recognized by the Higher Education Commission of Pakistan.

== History ==
Government College for Women was inaugurated by the respectable Mohtarma Fatima Jinnah (Mather-e-Millat) on 1 December 1951 and its first principal was Muneem-ud-Din. Next to Miss Muneem-ud-Din, Miss Kazmi a well known educationist became the second principal of the institution.Under Miss Kazmi the institution flourished to its full. The college was initiated with only 32 students and 10 teaching staff members. It multiplied to almost 4500 students and the teaching staff working at present is 71 out of 108 and the Non-Teaching staff is 61. The F.A. classes started in 1951, F.Sc. classes in 1952 and B.Sc. in 1960. The college was upgraded into a Post Graduated College in 1989 offering master's degree classes in the subject of English, Urdu and Islamiyat. BS Hons. 4 Years Degree Program was introduced by the Higher Education Department in 2010. Keeping in view its educational growth rate, it attained the status of first Women University in Sialkot in 2012 and was renamed as the Government College Women University, Sialkot.

== Programs ==
The university offers undergraduate and postgraduate programs in the following disciplines:

=== Science and technology ===
- Information Technology
- Zoology
- Botany
- Chemistry
- Physics
- Computer Science
- Political Science
- Biology
- Environmental sciences
- Biochemistry
- Biotechnology

=== Arts and humanities ===
- English
- Urdu
- Economics
- Mathematics
- Education

=== Business and social sciences ===
- Business Administration
- Statistics
- Applied Psychology
- Fine arts
- Islamic learning
- International Relations
- Sociology
- Criminology

== See also ==
- University of Sahiwal
- Government College Women University, Faisalabad
- University of Okara
- Government Sadiq College Women University, Bahawalpur
- Women University Multan
