= Bilal Akbar Khan =

Pakistani politician

Member of the Provincial Assembly of the Punjab
- In office 15 August 2018 – 14 January 2023
- Constituency: PP-49 Narowal-IV

Personal details
- Born: 2 May 1980 (age 46) Gujrat, Punjab, Pakistan
- Party: PMLN (2018-present)
- Relations: Shujaat Ahmed Khan (uncle)

Bilal Akbar Khan (born 2 May 1980) is a Pakistani politician who had been a Member of the Provincial Assembly of the Punjab from August 2018 till January 2023.

== Early life and education ==
Bilal was born on 2 May 1980 in Gujrat, Punjab, Pakistan into a politically active Punjabi Rajput family as both of his uncles, Chaudhry Shafaat Ahmed Khan and Lt Col (Retd) Shujaat Ahmed Khan, have been parliamentarians.

He graduated in Finance from the Ohio State University, USA in 2004.

== Political career ==
He was elected to the Provincial Assembly of the Punjab as a candidate of Pakistan Muslim League (N) from Constituency PP-49 (Narowal-IV) in the 2018 Pakistani general election.

In March 2024, he was made part of the Maryam Nawaz cabinet at the provincial level in Punjab, becoming minister of Transport.
