= Special education department (Punjab, Pakistan) =

Pakistani provincial governmental education department

- شعبہ خصوصی تعلیم

Education Department overview
- Formed: 2003
- Jurisdiction: Government of Punjab, Pakistan
- Headquarters: Lahore, Punjab Pakistan
- Motto: Committed to Delicately Serve the Valuable Segment
- Education Department executive: Syed Tahir Raza Hamdani, Director General
- Website: sed.punjab.gov.pk

Special Education Department is a department of Government of Punjab, Pakistan. The department meets the special education requirements of the disabled children especially, hearing impaired, visually impaired, mentally disabled and physically disabled.

In 1983–84, the Directorate of Special Education Punjab was established in the Education Department. In 2003, the Special Education Department was established as an independent administrative department.

== History ==
At the time of independence, there were only two institutions, one for the Hearing Impaired at Lahore and the other for the Blind at Bahawalpur, functioning under the control of Education Department. A few institutions for the Hearing Impaired children and Visually Impaired children were also being run by the private sector organizations in the Province. Inspectorate of Schools for the Deaf, Dumb and Blind was established under the Education Department during 1962. It was given status of Deaf, Dumb and Blind Wing, headed by a deputy director during 1968. These institutions were nationalized in 1975 under Martial Law Regulation MLR-118. The Education Department took over these institutions and initiated various schemes for construction of buildings and to staff them with trained teachers. Directorate of Special Education Punjab was given the status of an attached department of the Education Department during 1983–84. Special Education Department was established as an independent administrative department during 2003–04. Prior to establishment of an independent department of Special Education Department, there were 51 institutions in the province with an enrollment of 4265, which has now risen to 248 catering almost 28,850 special children, including 20 institutions of special education devolved from Federal Government as a result of 18th Constitutional Amendment. Presently, special institutions are functioning at every Tehsil and Town Level.

== See also ==
- Ministry of Federal Education and Professional Training
- Education in Pakistan
- List of special education institutions in Pakistan
- School education department (Punjab, Pakistan)
- Higher education department (Punjab, Pakistan)
- Literacy & non-formal basic education department (Punjab, Pakistan)
