= Agriculture in Pakistan =

Development of agricultural output in Pakistan in 2015 US$ since 1961

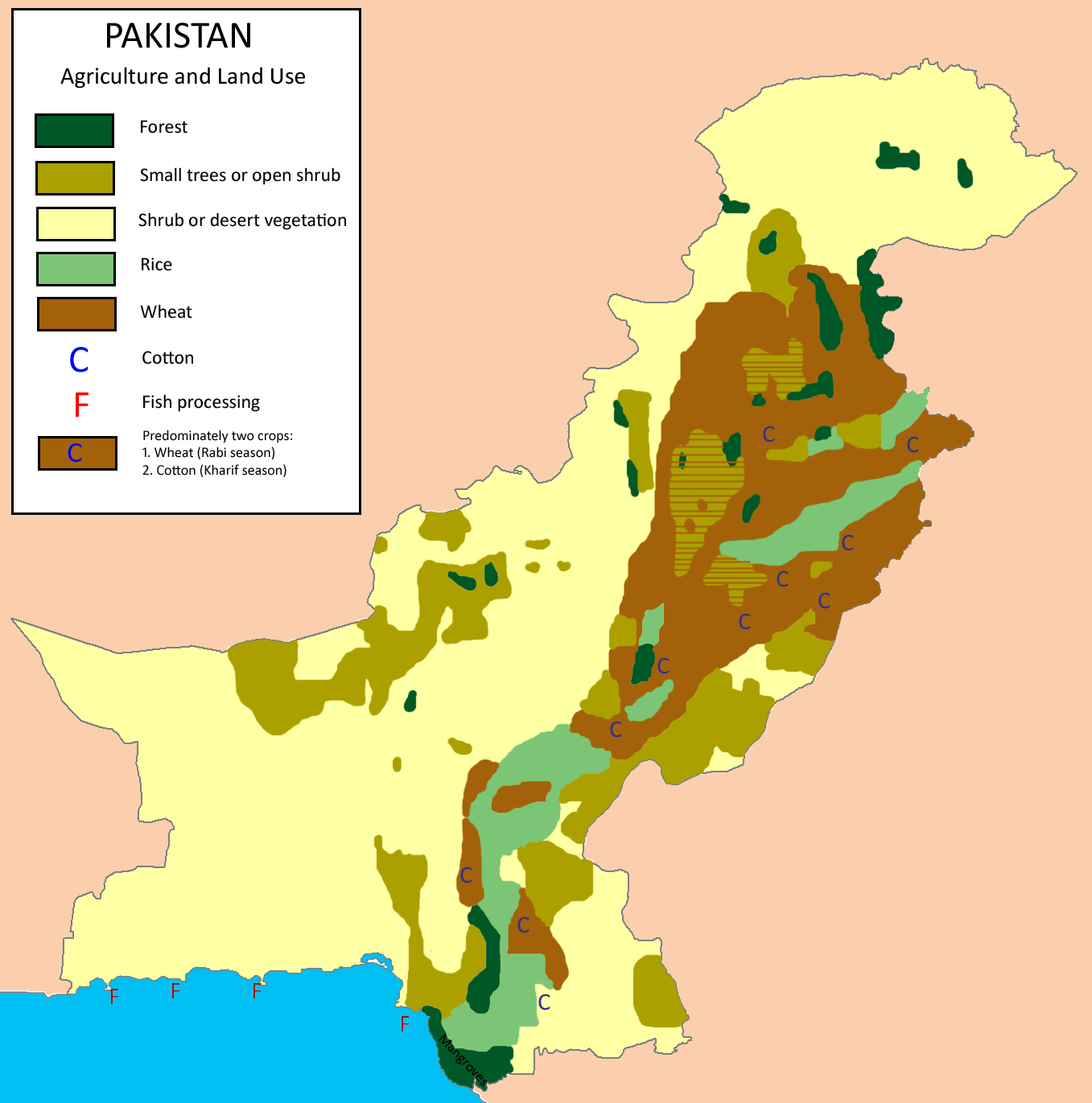
Agriculture and land use in Pakistan. (Only major crops)

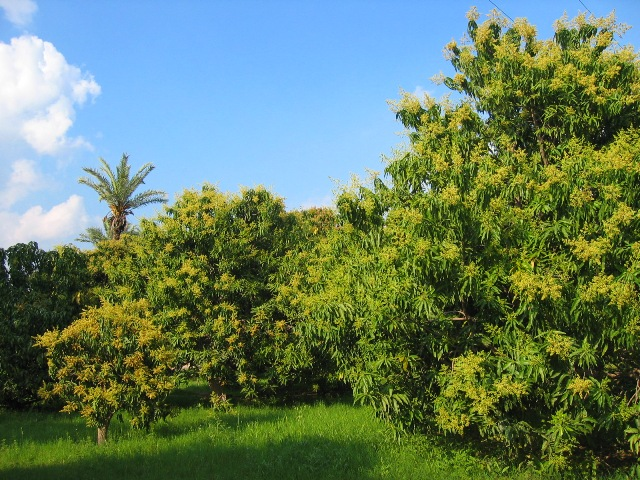
Mango Orchard in Multan, Pakistan

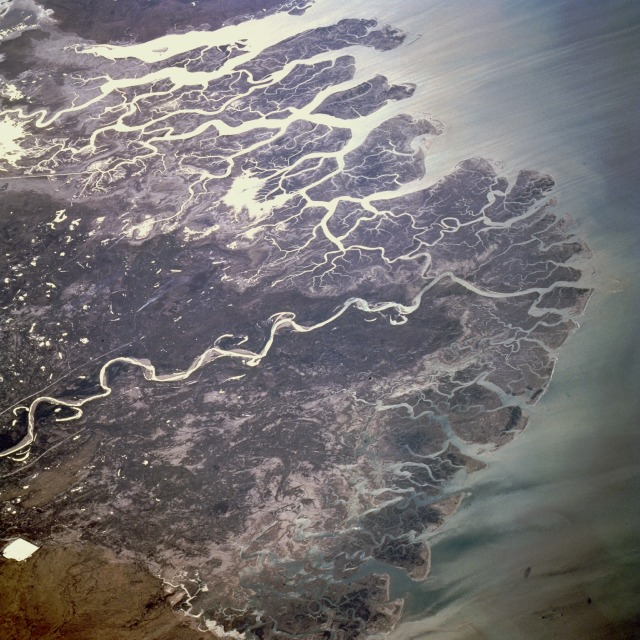
Indus River Delta

Agriculture is considered the backbone of Pakistan's economy, which relies heavily on its major crops. According to the Food and Agriculture Organization, agriculture contributes approximately 23% of GDP and employs 37.4% of the national labour force. Around 47% of the country’s land is agricultural and 82% of cultivated land is irrigated. Major crops include wheat, rice, cotton and sugarcane. Punjab is the premier agricultural province, with wheat, rice and cotton as its primary crops. Mango orchards are mostly found in Sindh and Punjab provinces, making the country the world's fourth largest producer of mangoes.

In 2025 it was estimated that Pakistan has 21.3 million hectares farmland, cultivated by over 10 million farmers, with an average farm size of about 2 hectares .

People rely on diesel to fuel their tractors, and consequently, an increase in diesel prices will further exacerbate their hardships.

Climate change has begun to exert considerable pressure on Pakistan's agricultural sector, with rising temperatures, water shortages, and unpredictable weather patterns affecting both crop quality and yield. In response, the country has seen the emergence of agritech initiatives promoting modern farming practices such as precision agriculture, solar-powered irrigation, and mobile advisory platforms. These digital tools help farmers receive timely weather alerts, market rates, and pest control guidance, particularly in Punjab and Sindh, where farming is most concentrated. Efforts are also underway to train farmers in sustainable techniques to enhance resilience and reduce dependency on diesel-powered machinery.

Pakistan is a net importer of petroleum products, and any depreciation in the value of the rupee against the dollar has also led to higher prices for both petrol and diesel, which are extensively used by the general population.

== Early history ==
Barley and wheat cultivation—along with the domestication of cattle, primarily sheep and goat—was visible in Mehrgarh by 8000–6000 BCE. They cultivated six-row barley, einkorn and emmer wheat, jujubes and dates, and herded sheep, goats and cattle. Residents of the later period (5500 BC to 2600 BC) put much effort into crafts, including flint knapping, tanning, bead production, and metal working. The site was occupied continuously until about 2655 BC.

Irrigation was developed in the Indus Valley civilization (see also Mohenjo-daro) by c. 4500 BCE. The size and prosperity of the Indus civilization grew as a result of this innovation, which eventually led to more planned settlements making use of drainage and sewers. Sophisticated irrigation and water storage systems were developed by the Indus Valley civilization, including artificial reservoirs at Girnar dated to 3000 BCE, and an early canal irrigation system from c.2600 BCE.

Archaeological evidence of an animal-drawn plough dates back to 2500 BC in the Indus Valley civilization.

All agricultural affairs and activities in Pakistan are overseen and regulated by the Ministry of Agriculture.

== Production ==
Pakistan production (2006):

- 67.1 million tons of sugarcane (5th largest global producer, behind Brazil, India, China & Thailand);
- 25.0 million tons of wheat (7th largest producer);
- 10.8 million tons of rice (10th largest producer);
- 6.3 million tons of maize (20th largest producer);
- 4.8 million tons of cotton (5th largest producer);
- 4.6 million tons of potato (18th largest producer);
- 2.3 million tons of mango (including mangosteen & guava) (5th largest global producer, just behind India, China, Thailand & Indonesia);
- 2.1 million tons of onion (6th largest producer);
- 1.6 million tons of orange (12th largest producer);
- 593 thousand tons of tangerine;
- 1,601 thousand tons of tomatoes;
- 545 thousand tons of apple;
- 540 thousand tons of watermelon;
- 501 thousand tons of carrot;
- 471 thousand tons of date (6th largest global producer);

In addition, smaller production of other agricultural products.

== Rankings ==
Pakistan is one of the world's largest producers and suppliers of food and crops (according to the various global sources).

- Chickpea (3rd)
- Apricot (6th)
- Cotton (5th)
- Milk (4th)
- Date Palm (5th)
- Sugarcane (5th)
- Onion (7th)
- Kinnow, mandarin oranges, clementine (6th)
- Mango (4th)
- Wheat (7th)
- Rice (11th)

Pakistan ranks 8th globally in farm output, according to the List of countries by GDP sector composition.

== Crops ==
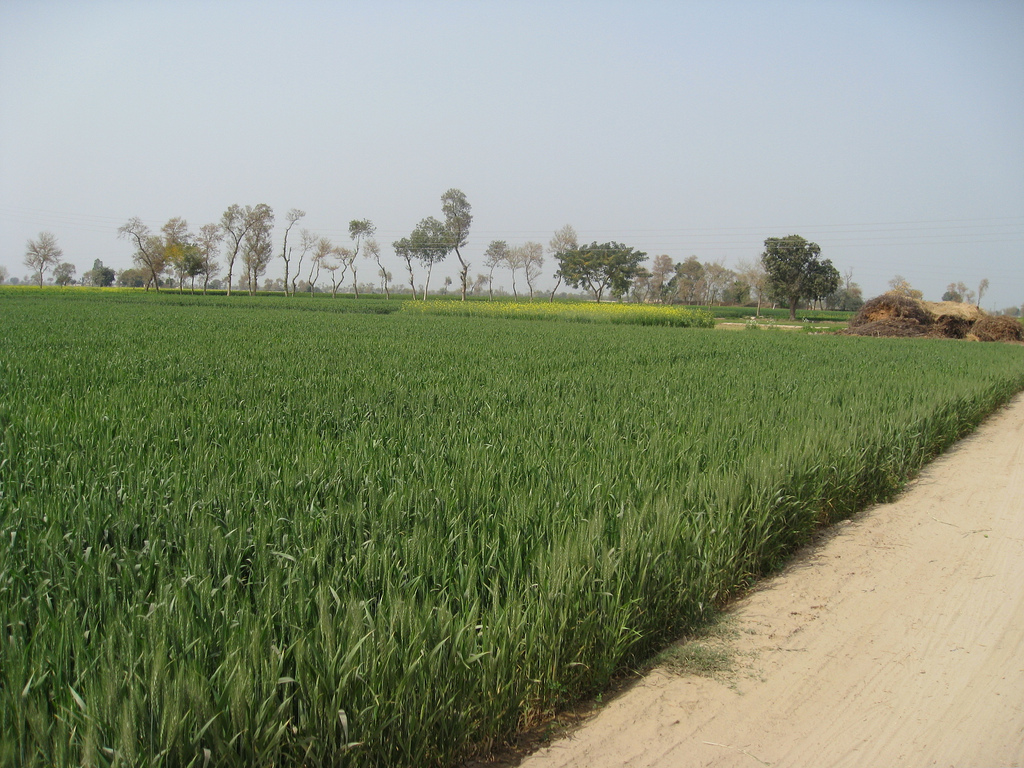
Wheat Fields in Punjab, Pakistan

The most important crops are wheat, sugarcane, cotton, and rice, which together account nearly more than 75% of the value of total crop output.

Pakistan's largest food crop is wheat. As of 2018, According to the ministry of agriculture, Pakistan wheat output reached 26.3 million tonnes. In 2005, Pakistan produced 21,591,400 metric tons of wheat, more than all of Africa (20,304,585 metric tons) and nearly as much as all of South America (24,557,784 metric tons), according to the FAO. The country had harvested more than 25 to 23 million tons of wheat in 2012.

Pakistan has also cut the use of dangerous pesticides dramatically.

Pakistan is a net food exporter, except in occasional years, when its harvest is adversely affected by droughts. Pakistan exports rice, cotton, fish, fruits (especially Oranges and Mangoes), and vegetables and imports vegetable oil, wheat, pulses and consumer foods. The country is world largest raw cotton market, 2nd-largest apricot & ghee market & 3rd-largest cotton, onion and milk market.

The economic importance of agriculture has declined since independence, when its share of GDP was ~ 53%. Following the poor harvest of 1993, the government introduced agriculture assistance policies, including increased support prices for many agricultural commodities and expanded availability of agricultural credit. From 1993 to 1997, real growth in the agricultural sector averaged 5.7%, but has since declined to ~ 4%. Agricultural reforms, including increased wheat and oilseed production, play a central role in the government's economic reform package.

Outdated irrigation practices have led to inefficient water usage in Pakistan. 25% of water withdrawn for use in the agricultural sector is lost through leakages and line losses in the canals. Only a limited amount of the remaining water is actually absorbed, and used by the crops due to poor soil texture and unlevelled fields.

Much of Pakistan's agriculture output is utilized by the country's growing processed-food industry. The value of processed retail food sales has grown 12% p.a. during the Nineties, & was estimated at over $1 billion in 2000, although supermarkets accounted for just over 10% of the outlets.

The Federal Bureau of Statistics provisionally valued major crop yields at Rs.504,868 million in 2005 thus registering 55%+ growth since 2000 while minor crop yields were valued at Rs.184,707 million in 2005 thus registering 41%+ growth since 2000. The exports related to the agriculture sector in 2009–10 are Rs 288.18 billion including food grains, vegetables, fruits, tobacco, fisheries products, spices & livestock.

== Livestock ==
According to the Economic Survey of Pakistan, the livestock sector contributes about half of the value added in the agriculture sector, amounting to nearly 11% of Pakistan's GDP, which is more than the crop sector.

The leading daily newspaper Jang reports that the national herd consists of 24.2 million cattle, 26.3 million buffaloes, 24.9 million sheep, 56.7 million goats & 0.8 million camels. Additionally, there is a vibrant poultry sector, with more than 530 million birds produced annually. These animals produce 29.472 million tons of milk (making Pakistan the 4th largest global producer of milk), 1.115 million tons of beef, 0.740 million tons of mutton, 0.416 million tons of poultry meat, 8.528 billion eggs, 40.2 thousand tons of wool, 21.5 thousand tons of hair & 51.2 million skins & hides.

The Food and Agriculture Organization reported in June 2006 that in Pakistan, government initiatives are being undertaken to modernize milk collection & to improve milk / milk product storage capacity.

The Federal Bureau of Statistics provisionally valued this sector at Rs.758,470 million in 2005, thus registering 70%+ growth since 2000.

== Fishery ==
Fishery and fishing industry plays an important role in the national economy. With a coastline of about 1046 km, Pakistan has enough fishery resources that remain to be fully developed. It's also a major source of export earnings. Aquaculture is a rapidly developing industry. Punjab Province has demonstrated rapid growth in fish farming. GIFT Tilapia culture has been introduced recently in Pakistan (especially Punjab).

== Forestry ==
About only 4% of land in Pakistan is covered with forest. The forests are a major source of food, lumber, paper, fuelwood, latex, medicine as well as utilised for purposes of wildlife conservation and ecotourism.

== Land distribution and land reform ==
Distribution of Land Ownership in Pakistan
	1972	1980	1990	2000
Gini Coefficient	0.66	0.65	0.66	0.66
% of landless households			65.0	63.3
% Share of Holdings < 2 hectares				
a. Households	47.3	n.a.	54.4	61.2
b. Land	5.4	n.a.	11.4	14.8
% Share of Holdings 20.2 + hectares				
a. Households	3.3	n.a.	2.8	2.0
b. Land	22.4	n.a.	34.0	29.7
SOURCE: Report No. 39303-PK Pakistan, Promoting Rural Growth and Poverty Reduction, March 30, 2007, Sustainable and Development Unit. South Asia Region. Document of the World Bank.

Some reformers have blamed imbalance in land ownership in Pakistan for playing a part in "maintaining poverty and food insecurity". According to the Pakistan-based NGO, Society For Conservation and Protection of The Environment (SCOPE), about one-half (50.8%) of rural households in Pakistan are landless, while 5% of the country's population owns almost two-thirds (64 percent) of its farmland. (The World Bank found that according to 2000 agricultural census 63.3% of rural households were landless. Of the remaining 37% of rural households, 61% of these owned fewer than 2 hectares, totaling 15% of total land. Two percent of households owned 20.2 hectares or more, accounting for 30 percent of total land area.) Concentration of ownership is also thought to be less productive than owner farmed land. According to the World Bank, "most empirical evidence indicates that land productivity on large farms in Pakistan is lower than that of small farms, holding other factors constant." Small farmers have "higher net returns per hectare" than large farms, according to farm household income data. Sharecropper productivity is also lower (about 20%) than landowner productivity, holding other factors constant, because there is less incentive for sharecroppers’ own-labour inputs.

The major effort to redistribute land to peasants and landless—Laws in 1972 and 1977 by Zulfikar Ali Bhutto—were struck down as un-Islamic by Pakistan courts in a number of decisions from 1979 to 1989.

The first attempts at land reform in Pakistan occurred under Ayub Khan's government, the West Pakistan Land Reforms Regulation 1959 (Regulation 64 of 1959). The law put a ceiling on individual holdings: no one individual could own more than 202.3 hectares (500 acres), of irrigated and 404.6 hectares (1,000 acres) of unirrigated land or a maximum of 36,000 Produce Index Units (PIU), whichever was greater. On result of this attempt at redistribution was that land was divided up among members of the landowning family to keep the land owned by individuals below the "ceiling".

The People's Party government (1971–1977) intended to transform Pakistan with land reform among other policies. Its rationale was that

1. land redistribution to the landless in the rural areas would alleviate poverty in the state and diminish inequality;
2. would weaken the power and dominance of the zamindars, Pakistan's 'feudal class';
3. and would be crafted so as to make Pakistan's agricultural production more efficient; transforming `traditional, inefficient absentee landlordism` into `modern, efficient agricultural entrepreneurship.`

It issued two major land reform laws, Land Reform Regulation 1972 (Martial Law Regulation - MLR 115) promulgated by Prime Minister Zulfikar Ali Bhutto, was designed to place ceilings on the agricultural holding of Pakistan's large landlords. Land in excess of a ceiling of 404.6 hectares (1,000 acres) was to be seized by the state without compensation and distributed to the landless. The ceiling was raised to 121.4 hectares (300 acres) if the land was unirrigated; exceptions were also granted for tractors or installed tubewells.

Another provision of MLR 115, Section 25, gave first right of re-emption (right of first refusal to buy) to the existing tenants. In 1977, another bill the Land Reform Act, 1977, reduced the ceiling to 40.4 hectares (100 acres), although this act provided for compensation to landlords.

"Analysts agree" that the implementation of land reforms under Ali Bhutto "left much to be desired." The amount of land seized and redistributed to the peasants was modest, and the reforms were not administered equitably, with implementation much more robust in the NWFP and Balochistan, where opposition to Bhutto was centered, than in provinces where his power base resided, (Sindh and Punjab). Many of Pakistan's large landlords mobilized against the reforms which they saw as "a direct challenged to their long-standing interest in maintaining political control in Pakistan's rural areas". The land reforms were attacked as "unjustly administered; and as inherently un-Islamic."

After Ali Bhutto was overthrown, landlord victims of land reform appealed to "Islamic Courts" established by Bhutto's successor General Zia-ul-Haq (i.e. the Shariah Appellate Bench and Federal Shariat Court), and these, rather than the executive or legislature of Pakistan, undid much of Ali Bhutto's redistribution. According to scholar Charles H. Kennedy, the courts effectively "suspended implementation" of the land reforms, "repealed the reforms, drafted new legislation, and then interpreted the new laws' meanings". A 3-2 decision in 1989 by the Shariat Appellate Bench ruled against setting a ceiling on size of landholdings (as the Bhutto land reform had done) on the grounds that "Islam does not countenance compulsory redistribution of wealth or land for the purpose of alleviating poverty, however laudable the goal of poverty relief may be." According to barrister writing in dawn.com, "The net result of the Qazalbash Waqf v Chief Land Commissioner (The 1989 Shariat Appellate Bench decision) is that land reforms in Pakistan are now at the same level as they were in 1947, as the 1972 regulations and the 1977 act have seen their main provisions being struck down and the 1959 regulations have been repealed."

A book published in 1988 sponsored by Cornell University has opposed the agricultural reforms in Pakistan, arguing it will contribute to the already unsustainable population growth in the country. This sentiment was repeated in a 2026 Geo News article.

== Shrinking farm sizes ==
The average farm size has steadily declined as following:

- 5.3 hectares in 1971
- 3.1 hectares in 2000
- 2.6 hectares in 2010

== Impacts of climate change ==
Future projections for Pakistan are that major crop yields such as of wheat and rice are expected to decrease significantly.

According to research led by Dr. Adil Najam at the Lahore University of Management Sciences, by 2040 the cost of climate change to agriculture in Pakistan is likely to be up to 7% of productivity but that good climate adaptation practices could result in a net productivity gain of up to 40%.

The 2022 Pakistan floods mainly caused by increased precipitation and glaciers melting fueled by climate change, destroyed around 50% of the crops of Pakistan which can lead to food shortages.

In 2024, it was reported that Pakistan has faced an orange shortage due to climate change, which has reduced citrus production by 35%, slashed exports, and led to the closure of processing factories.

== See also ==
- Economy of Pakistan
- Trading Corporation of Pakistan
- Zarai Taraqiati Bank Ltd.
- Farmers Association of Pakistan
- Digital Dera
