= Literacy & non-formal basic education department (Punjab, Pakistan) =

Pakistani institution

The Literacy & Non-Formal Basic Education Department is a department of Government of Punjab, Pakistan. It was created in 2002 to address the problem of dropouts at the primary level and meet the emerging demand for non-formal basic education with functional literacy and livelihood skills. The department is working in collaboration with Japan International Cooperation Agency (JICA) and United Nations International Children's Emergency Fund (UNICEF).

== See also ==
- School education department (Punjab, Pakistan)
- Special education department (Punjab, Pakistan)
- Higher education department (Punjab, Pakistan)
- Education in Pakistan
- Ministry of Federal Education and Professional Training
