= Punjab Livestock and Dairy Development Department =

Government Department in Punjab, Pakistan

- محکمہ لائیو سٹاک اینڈ ڈیری ڈویلپمنٹ

Department overview
- Jurisdiction: Punjab, Pakistan
- Headquarters: Livestock Complex, 16-Cooper Road, Lahore
- Minister responsible: Minister of Livestock, Punjab
- Department executive: Secretary Livestock, Punjab, Ahmad Aziz Tarar
- Website: Punjab Livestock

Punjab Livestock and Dairy Development Department (Punjabi: محکمہ لائیو سٹاک اینڈ ڈیری ڈویلپمنٹ پنجاب) is a department of Government of Punjab, Pakistan. The department is rendering different services to the livestock sector of Punjab through its infrastructure network in the field.

== Attached Organizations ==
=== Research Institutes ===
- Buffalo Research Institute Pattoki
- Research Centre for Conservation of Sahiwal Cattle

=== Autonomous ===
- University of Veterinary and Animal Sciences, Lahore
- Cholistan University of Veterinary and Animal Sciences, Bahawalpur
- Society for the Prevention of Cruelty to Animals
- Livestock Breeding Services Authority
- Punjab Halal Development Agency

=== Companies ===
- Punjab Agriculture and Meat Company
- Punjab Livestock and Dairy Development Board
