= Punjab Food Authority =

Government body in Pakistan

Agency overview
- Formed: 2011; 15 years ago
- Jurisdiction: Punjab, Pakistan
- Minister responsible: Bilal Yasin, Minister of Food, Punjab
- Agency executive: Muhammad Asim Javaid (Pakistan Administrative Service PAS), Director General
- Parent department: Punjab Food Department
- Website: https://pfa.gop.pk/

The Punjab Food Authority (PFA) (Urdu: مقتدرہ خوراک پنجاب) is an agency of the provincial Government of Punjab in Pakistan. It regulates food safety and hygiene in the Province. It was formed under the Punjab Food Authority Act 2011. The PFA is the first agency of its kind in Pakistan. Enforcement of food hygiene and quality standards as described in the Punjab Food Authority Act 2011 and the Pure Food Rules 2011.

The Punjab food Authority has been working as a functional entity in district Lahore since 2 July 2012. Enforcement of food hygiene and quality standards as described in the Punjab Food Authority Act 2011 and the Pure Food Rules 2011 is carried out through a qualified team of Food Safety Officers (FSOs’) and Assistant Food Safety Officers (AFSOs’). The functionality of field teams at the district level is being supervised by the Deputy Director (Operations).
