= Imran Ali (Pakistan International Airlines cricketer) =

Pakistani cricketer

Personal information
- Full name: Imran Ali Khan
- Born: 27 August 1987 (age 39); Sahiwal, Punjab, Pakistan
- Batting: Right-handed
- Bowling: Right-arm off-break
- Role: Batsman

Domestic team information
- Years: Team
- 2006–2009: Pakistan International Airlines

Career statistics
Competition	FC
Matches	5
Runs scored	36
Batting average	7.20
100s/50s	0/0
Top score	17
Balls bowled	12
Wickets	0
Bowling average	n/a
5 wickets in innings	0
10 wickets in match	0
Best bowling	0/8
Catches/stumpings	1/-
- Source: CricketArchive, 25 June 2013

Imran Ali (born 27 August 1987) is a former Pakistani cricketer who played several matches for Pakistan International Airlines (PIA) during the late 2000s. From Sahiwal, Punjab, Imran played five first-class matches for the team, with the first of these coming during the 2006–07 season and the last during the 2009–10 season. A right-handed batsman, he had little success—he passed double figures only once, with his highest score, 17 runs, achieved against Lahore Shalimar in December 2009. He finished his career with 36 runs from six innings, and failed to take any wickets from two overs bowling off-breaks. Cricinfo, a cricket website, incorrectly lists Imran as also having played a single List A match for PIA during the 2007–08 season. The player in this match was in fact the similarly named Ali Imran.
