= Punjab Forensic Science Agency =

Pakistani governmental organisation

Agency overview
- Formed: October 30, 2009
- Jurisdiction: Punjab, Pakistan
- Headquarters: PFSA Thokar Niaz Baig, Multan Road, Lahore
- Employees: About 800
- Agency executive: Dr. Muhammad Amjad, Director General
- Parent department: Home Department, Govt. of Punjab
- Website: www.pfsa.gop.pk

Footnotes
- Initiated for Construction in 2006 and Inaugurated by Chief Minister Mian Shehbaz Sharif in 2009

The Punjab Forensic Science Agency (Urdu: پنجاب فرانزک سائینس اتھارٹی, abbreviated as PFSA) is a government agency under the Home Department, of the provincial Government of Punjab of Pakistan. It provides forensic science services primarily to law enforcement in the province. The Punjab Forensic Science Agency act was passed by the Punjab Assembly on 4 October 2007; assented to by the Governor of Punjab on 29 October 2007; and was published in the Punjab Gazette (Extraordinary), dated 30 October 2007.

Punjab Forensic Science agency management maintains a quality management system to meet the requirements of international standard for laboratories ISO 17025:2005 and ASCLD-LAB International (American society for crime laboratory directors Laboratory accreditation Board) to achieve high level of customer (Law Enforcement agencies) satisfaction.

== Structure ==
Some services the Agency provides are

- Computer Forensic Unit
- Crime and Death Scene Investigation
- DNA and Serology
- Forensic Photography
- Firearm and Tool Marks
- Narcotics and drug abuse
- Latent Finger Prints
- Pathology
- Polygraph
- Questioned Documents
- Toxicology
- Trace Chemistry
