= International Women University =

Women's university in Indonesia

- Universitas Wanita Internasional
- Type: Private
- Established: February 13, 2008; 18 years ago
- Affiliations: Arena Komunikasi Bandung Foundation
- Rector: Dewi Indriani
- Location: Jl. Ahmad Yani No. 18-20, Kota Bandung, Jawa Barat, Indonesia; 6°55′19.7616″S 107°37′5.358″E
- Colors: Purple; Orange
- Website: www.iwu.ac.id

International Women University or IWU (Indonesian: Universitas Wanita Internasional) is the first women's university in Indonesia. It is located in Bandung, the capital city of West Java. It is a private university, under supervision of Arena Komunikasi Bandung Foundation.

IWU is established at February 13 2008, according to letter of establishment SKPT No. 26DO2008. It was inaugurated by State Minister for Women's Empowerment and Child Protection of the Republic of Indonesia, Linda Amalia Sari, to empowering Indonesian women and to increase the number of qualified women not only in the legislature, but in all sectors, such as NGOs, executives and other institutions. For this reason, the International Women's University also organizes a double degree program.

== Academics ==
International Women University offers undergraduate and postgraduate programs in the following disciplines:

- Faculty of science and technology
  - Math
  - Biology
  - Chemistry
  - Physics
  - Informatics engineering
- Faculty of art and design
  - Visual communication design
  - Interior design
- Faculty of social and business
  - International relations
  - Politics
  - Business administration
  - Communication
