= Punjab Housing and Town Planning Agency =

Pakistani provincial governmental department

- Location: Lahore, Pakistan
- Region served: Punjab, Pakistan
- Website: phata.punjab.gov.pk

Punjab Housing and Town Planning Agency (PHATA) is an agency responsible to construct and maintain affordable housing schemes in Punjab, Pakistan. It is part of the Government of Punjab, Pakistan.In the Govt. Of Imran Khan he started a scheme Naya Pakistan Housing Program by this department. And now CM Punjab Mariyam Nawaz Sharif started Apni Chhat Apna Ghar and Apni Zameen Apna Ghar Program by PHATA.

== History ==
In September 2022, Punjab Land Development Company (PLDC) was merged into the Punjab Housing and Town Planning Agency.
