= The Women University Multan =

Public University in Multan, Pakistan

Coordinates: 30.2441°N 71.5638°E

The Women University Multan وؤمن یونیورسٹی ملتان
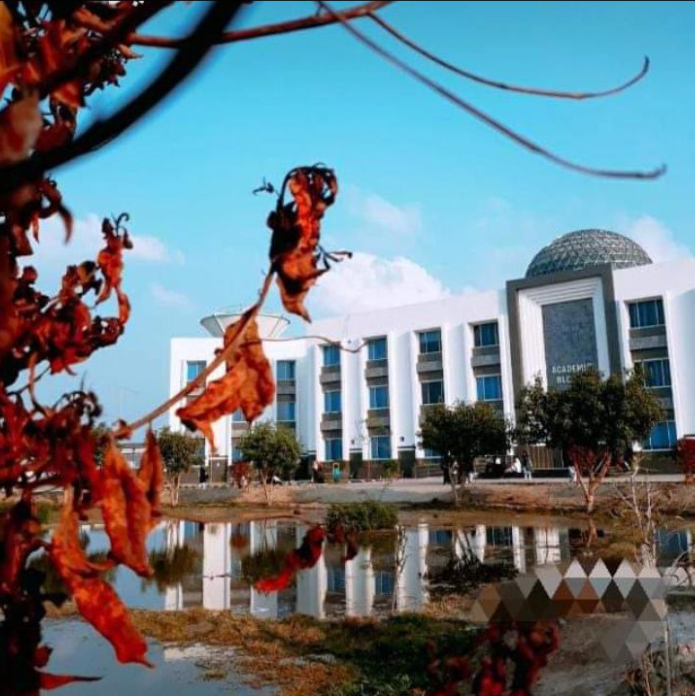
- Flooding in autumn at WUM
- Motto: ilm-Tafakur-Tadabbur
- Motto in English: Knowledge-Contemplation-Reflection
- Type: Public
- Established: 2013
- Affiliations: Higher Education Commission (Pakistan)
- Chancellor: Governor of the Punjab
- Location: Multan, Punjab, Pakistan
- Nickname: WUM
- Mascot: WUMian
- Website: wum.edu.pk

The Women University Multan (WUM), Urdu: وؤمن یونیورسٹی ملتان, is a public university located in Multan, Punjab, Pakistan.

== Recognized university ==
This is a recognized university by the Higher Education Commission of Pakistan.

== Programs ==
Women University Multan offers undergraduate and postgraduate programs in the following disciplines:

=== Arts and Humanities ===
- English
- Mathematics
- Urdu
- Islamiyat

=== Business and Social Sciences ===
- Economics
- Business Administration
- Psychology
- Sociology

=== Science and Technology ===
- Statistics
- Computer Science
- Information Technology
- Chemistry
- Physics

== See also ==
- University of Sahiwal
- Government College Women University, Faisalabad
- Government College Women University, Sialkot
- University of Okara
- Government Sadiq College Women University, Bahawalpur
