= Government Sadiq College Women University =

Public university in Pakistan

The Government Sadiq College Women University Bahawalpur
- دی گورنمنٹ صادق کالج ویمن یونیورسٹی بہاولپور
- Type: Public
- Established: 2013
- Affiliations: Higher Education Commission (Pakistan)
- Chancellor: Governor of the Punjab
- Vice-Chancellor: Prof. Dr. Shazia Anjum
- Location: Bahawalpur, Punjab, Pakistan
- Nickname: GSCWU
- Website: gscwu.edu.pk

The Government Sadiq College Women University (GSCWU) (Urdu: دی گورنمنٹ صادق کالج وؤمن یونیورسٹی بہاولپور) is a public university located in Bahawalpur, Punjab, Pakistan.

== History ==
Government Sadiq College Women University was originally founded in 1944 by Nawab Sir Sadiq Khan Abbasi V as an intermediate college. In 1957, it was upgraded to a degree college. The college was upgraded again into a post-graduate college in 2010, as Master level programs were instated.

In December 2012, the college was approved as a full-fledged university. It is the only women's university in Bahawalpur Division.

== Programs ==
GSCWU offers undergraduate and postgraduate programmes in the following disciplines:

- Artificial Intelligence
- Information Technology
- Computer Science
- Botany
- Zoology
- English
- Education
- Urdu
- Economics
- Mathematics
- Business Administration
- Applied Psychology
- Chemistry
- Physics
- Islamic Studies
- Biotechnology
- Food Sciences and Technology
- Environmental Science
- Medical Lab Technology
- Biochemistry
- Media and Communication Studies

GSCWU offers MPhil programs in

- Computer Science
- Management Science
- MBA
- Economics
- Physics
- Mathematics
- Chemistry
- Botany
- Zoology
- Urdu
- Islamic Studies

GSCWU also offers Ph.D. programs in

- Economics
- Mathematics
- Chemistry
- Zoology
- Urdu
- Islamic Studies

== See also ==
- University of Sahiwal
- Government College Women University, Faisalabad
- Government College Women University, Sialkot
- University of Okara
- Women University Multan
