= PP-150 Lahore-VI =

Constituency of the Punjabi Provincial Legislature, Pakistan

- Constituency for the Provincial Assembly of Punjab
- Region: Lahore City in Lahore District

Current constituency
- Created from: PP-144 Lahore-VIII (2002-2018); PP-149 Lahore-VI (2018-2023)

PP-150 Lahore-VI (پی پی-150، لاہور-6) is a Constituency of Provincial Assembly of Punjab.

== General elections 2024 ==
Provincial election 2024: PP-150 Lahore-VI
| Party | Candidate | Votes | % | ±% |
|---|---|---|---|---|
| PML(N) | Khawaja Imran Nazir | 34,957 | 39.85 | |
| Independent | Abdul Karim Khan (Note: Filed nomination papers as PTI candidate but ECP allowed him to run as an Independent) | 30,318 | 34.56 | |
| TLP | Muhammad Abbas | 16,464 | 18.77 | |
| Others | Others (eleven candidates) | 5,984 | 6.82 | |
| Turnout | | 89,101 | 37.45 | |
| Total valid votes | | 87,723 | 98.45 | |
| Rejected ballots | | 1,378 | 1.55 | |
| Majority | | 4,639 | 5.29 | |
| Registered electors | | 237,891 | | |
| hold | | | | |

== General elections 2018 ==
Provincial election 2018: PP-149 Lahore-VI
| Party | Candidate | Votes | % | ±% |
|---|---|---|---|---|
| PML(N) | Mian Marghoob Ahmad | 66,960 | 46.56 | |
| PTI | Muhammad Zubair Khan Niazi | 61,278 | 42.61 | |
| TLP | Muhammad Raza Konain | 10,812 | 7.52 | |
| PPP | Nadir Khan | 1,578 | 1.10 | |
| AAT | Saira Bano | 1,444 | 1.00 | |
| Others | Others (eight candidates) | 1,737 | 1.21 | |
| Turnout | | 145,241 | 52.75 | |
| Total valid votes | | 143,809 | 99.01 | |
| Rejected ballots | | 1,432 | 0.99 | |
| Majority | | 5,682 | 3.95 | |
| Registered electors | | 275,367 | | |

== General elections 2013 ==
Provincial election 2013: PP-144 Lahore-VIII
| Party | Candidate | Votes | % | ±% |
|---|---|---|---|---|
| PML(N) | Bao Akhtar | 64,114 | 69.58 | |
| PTI | Mian Hamid Miraj | 22,827 | 24.77 | |
| PPP | Syed Zahid Ali Shah | 3,918 | 4.25 | |
| Others | Others (twenty candidates) | 1,287 | 1.40 | |
| Turnout | | 93,094 | 51.97 | |
| Total valid votes | | 92,146 | 98.98 | |
| Rejected ballots | | 948 | 1.02 | |
| Majority | | 41,287 | 44.81 | |
| Registered electors | | 179,114 | | |

== General elections 2008 ==
| Contesting candidates | Party affiliation | Votes polled |

== See also ==
- PP-149 Lahore-V
- PP-151 Lahore-VII
