= Khawaja Imran Nazir =

Pakistani politician

Provincial Minister of Primary & Secondary Health Care for Punjab
- Incumbent
- Assumed office 6 March 2024

Member of the Provincial Assembly of the Punjab
- Incumbent
- Assumed office 24 February 2024
- Constituency: PP-150 Lahore-VI
- In office 15 August 2018 – 14 January 2023
- Constituency: PP-183 Kasur-IX
- In office 2008 – 31 May 2018
- Constituency: PP-153 Lahore-X

Personal details
- Born: 18 November 1974 (age 51) Lahore, Punjab, Pakistan
- Party: PMLN (2008-present)

Punjab Assembly Lahore

Khawaja Imran Nazir (born 18 November 1974) is a Pakistani politician who is currently serving as Provincial Minister of Primary & Secondary Healthcare for Punjab, Pakistan in the Maryam ministry. He is also a Member of the Provincial Assembly of the Punjab since 2024 and prior to this was a Member of the assembly from 2008 to May 2018 and from August 2018 till January 2023.

== Early life and education ==
He was born on 18 November 1974 in Lahore.

He graduated in 2005 from University of the Punjab and has a degree of Bachelor of Arts.

== Political career ==
He was elected to the Provincial Assembly of the Punjab as a candidate of Pakistan Muslim League (N) (PML-N) from Constituency PP-139 (Lahore-III) in the 2008 Pakistani general election. He received 29,955 votes and defeated Chaudhry Muhammad Asghar, a candidate of Pakistan Peoples Party (PPP). In the same election, he also ran for the seat of the Provincial Assembly of the Punjab as an independent candidate from Constituency PP-140 (Lahore-IV), from Constituency PP-146 (Lahore-X), from Constituency PP-147 (Lahore-XI), from Constituency PP-149 (Lahore-XIII) and from Constituency PP-151 (Lahore-XV) but was unsuccessful and lost all seats.

He was re-elected to the Provincial Assembly of the Punjab as a candidate of PML-N from Constituency PP-137 (Lahore-I) in the 2013 Pakistani general election. He received 50,936 votes and defeated Muhammd Yasir, a candidate of Pakistan Tehreek-e-Insaf (PTI).

In December 2013, he was appointed Parliamentary Secretary for health.

He was inducted into the provincial Punjab cabinet of Chief Minister Shehbaz Sharif in November 2016 and was made Provincial Minister of Punjab for primary and secondary health.

He was re-elected to Provincial Assembly of the Punjab as a candidate of PML-N from Constituency PP-153 (Lahore-X) in the 2018 Pakistani general election.

He was officially elected from the seat PP-150 Lahore-IV in the 2024 Punjab provincial election as a PML-N candidate. Following this he was inducted into the Maryam ministry as the Provincial Minister for both primary and secondary health.
