= U of O =

U of O may refer to:

== Canada ==
- University of Ottawa, Ottawa, Ontario

== United States ==
- University of Oklahoma, Norman, Oklahoma
- University of Oregon, Eugene, Oregon
- University of the Ozarks, Clarksville, Arkansas

== See also ==
- UO (disambiguation)
