= Sahiwal Medical College =

Medical college in Punjab, Pakistan

Sahiwal Medical College, Sahiwal
- ساہیوال میڈیکل کالج ساہیوال
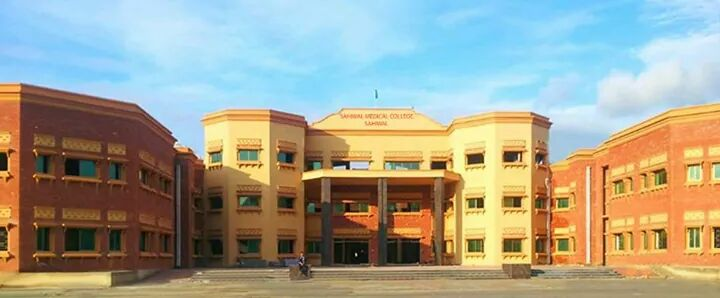
- Sahiwal Medical College, Sahiwal
- Other name: Sahiwal Teaching Hospital
- Motto: Knowledge, Service and Excellence
- Type: Public sector college
- Established: 2010
- Academic affiliations: University of Health Sciences (Lahore); Pakistan Medical and Dental Council
- Principal: Professor Dr. Muhammad Akhtar Malik
- Students: 600
- Location: Medical College Road, Farid Town, Sahiwal, Punjab, Pakistan
- Colours: Maroon & green
- Website: slmc.edu.pk

Sahiwal Medical College, Sahiwal (Urdu:ساہیوال میڈیکل کالج ساہیوال ), SLMC, established in 2010, is a public school of medicine located in Sahiwal, Punjab, Pakistan.

== Recognized college ==
This college is recognized by the Pakistan Medical and Dental Council. District Headquarter Teaching Hospital, Sahiwal (DHQ Hospital) is the attached teaching hospital.

== Inauguration ==
Sahiwal is a district and division of Punjab. Feeling the need of a medical college in the area, on 27 November 2010, Chief Minister of Punjab laid the foundation stone of Sahiwal Medical College. The government allotted 70 acres near Central Jail Sahiwal for the college, where the campus was completed in 2014 and the college shifted to its new building.

== Academic programs ==
- Bachelor of Medicine and Bachelor of Surgery (MBBS) – a five-year undergraduate programme

== Departments ==
- Basic science departments
  - Anatomy
  - Biochemistry
  - Community medicine
  - Forensic medicine
  - Pathology
  - Pharmacology
  - Physiology
- Medicine and allied departments
  - Cardiology
  - Dermatology
  - Endocrinology & Metabolism
  - General medicine
  - Neurology
  - Pediatrics
  - Preventive medicine
  - Psychiatry
  - Pulmonology (Chest medicine)
  - Radiotherapy
  - Urology
- Surgery and allied departments
  - Anesthesiology
  - Cardiac surgery
  - Cosmetic surgery
  - General surgery
  - Neurosurgery
  - Obstetrics and gynaecology
  - Ophthalmology
  - Oral and maxillofacial surgery
  - Orthopedics
  - Otorhinolaryngology
  - Pediatric surgery
  - Radiology
- Administrative departments
  - IT Department
