= Shujaat Ahmed Khan =

Pakistani politician

Member of the Provincial Assembly of the Punjab
- In office 2002 – 31 May 2018
- Constituency: PP-136 (Narowal-V)

Personal details
- Born: 20 April 1947 (age 79) Narowal
- Party: Pakistan Muslim League (N)

Shujaat Ahmed Khan is a Pakistani politician who was a Member of the Provincial Assembly of the Punjab, from 2002 to May 2018.

== Early life and education ==
He was born on 20 April 1947 in Narowal. He belongs to a Rajput Khokhar tribe. He has a degree of Bachelor of Science which he obtained in 1966 from Government Degree College in Sheikhupura.

== Political career ==
He was elected to the Provincial Assembly of the Punjab as a candidate of Pakistan Muslim League (Q) (PML-Q) from Constituency PP-136 (Narowal-V) in the 2002 Pakistani general election. He received 32,964 votes and defeated Chaudhry Masood Ahmed Basra, a candidate of Pakistan Peoples Party (PPP).

He was re-elected to the Provincial Assembly of the Punjab as a candidate of PML-Q from Constituency PP-136 (Narowal-V) in the 2008 Pakistani general election. He received 17,795 votes and defeated Abida Raza Saqlain Bukhari, a candidate of Pakistan Muslim League (N) (PML-N).

He was re-elected to the Provincial Assembly of the Punjab as a candidate of PML-N from Constituency PP-136 (Narowal-V) in the 2013 Pakistani general election. He received 47,475 votes and defeated an independent candidate, Muhammad Wakeel khan Manj.

In December 2013, he was appointed as Parliamentary Secretary for colonies, provincial disaster management authority.
