= University of Okara =

Public university in Punjab, Pakistan

Coordinates: 30.8669°N 73.5660°E

- Urdu: جامعہ اوکاڑہ
- Other names: UO, UoO. Okara University
- Former name: University of Okara
- Motto: Urdu: 'تفکر تدبر تحقیق'
- Motto in English: Explore, Meditate, Research
- Type: Public
- Established: 2016; 10 years ago
- Accreditation: Higher Education Commission (Pakistan)
- Chancellor: Governor of the Punjab
- Vice-Chancellor: Sajjad Mubbin
- Location: Renala Khurd, Okara, Punjab, Pakistan
- Campus: Rural 205 Acres
- Colours: Navy Blue & white
- Mascot: Mota bhalu
- Website: uo.edu.pk

The University of Okara (UO) (Urdu: جامعہ اوکاڑہ) is a public university located in Renala Khurd, Okara, Punjab, Pakistan.

== History ==
In 2005, Okara campus of the University of Education, Lahore (UE) was inaugurated by then Minister of Defence (Pakistan) Rao Sikandar Iqbal. On 23 February 2016, Provincial Assembly of the Punjab passed the "University of Okara Bill 2016". Following that, Government of the Punjab issued a notification on 1 April 2016, for the upgradation of Okara campus to the University of Okara.

== Campus ==
The University of Okara operates two campuses: the Main Campus located on the GT Road between Okara and Renala Khurd, and the City Campus situated on Samadpura Road in Okara city.

=== Main Campus ===
The Main Campus spans about 205 acres and is surrounded by open agricultural land. It comprises five academic blocks named ACE-I, ACE-II, ACE-III, ACE-IV, and ACE-V, along with five cafeterias: the Main Canteen, Hot and Cool, Sports Café, Latrova Café, and Doms Café. The campus also features extensive sports facilities, including cricket grounds, football and hockey fields, tennis courts, and general-purpose grounds. A large mosque was completed in August 2025, while the eastern side hosts a residential colony for university staff. The campus has four entry gates, with the northern boundary adjoining the GT Road and a railway line, and the southern side bordered by a canal road. A pedestrian bridge connects the main entrance across the railway and GT Road.

=== City Campus ===
The City Campus is located on Samadpura Road in Okara, within a crowded and densely populated urban area. It consists of a single block that houses many academic departments and has one main entry gate. The campus mainly serves students from Okara city and nearby localities.

== About ==
The 204-acre campus is surrounded by the Lower Bari Doab Canal and a forest belt on one side, and by the National Highway and Railway Tracks on the other . The UO currently has 29 academic departments and 7 new are on the cards. These departments are offering 80 BS Programs, 35 MPhil/MS Programs, and 10 PhD Programs. There are 12,000 students and 131 regular faculty members.

=== Vision ===
To positively contribute to the educational, economic, and sustainable development of the local communities and the nation at large by providing high-quality, internationally recognized academic programs, which focus on developing professional skills and promoting employability.

=== Mission ===
The University of Okara is a Public Sector institution of higher learning committed to advancing academic excellence, expanding industry-oriented and professional knowledge, creating a diverse and inclusive community and preparing leaders who are dedicated to ethical conduct and compassionate service.

== See also ==
- University of Sahiwal
- University of Education
- Government Sadiq College Women University, Bahawalpur
- Women University Multan
