= Quaid-e-Azam College of Engineering and Technology, Sahiwal =

College in Punjab, Pakistan

Coordinates: 30.6060°N 73.1252°E

Quaid-e-Azam Educational Complex
- QEC Sahiwal
- Other name: QCET
- Type: Private
- Established: 1997
- Affiliations: University of Engineering and Technology, Lahore, Pakistan Engineering Council, National Technology Council (Pakistan)
- Chairman: Ali Hassan
- Director: Zamir ul Hassan
- Ractor: Mubashar Hassan
- Location: Sahiwal, Punjab, Pakistan
- Website: quaideazam.edu.pk

The Quaid-e-Azam College of Engineering and Technology (QCET) (Urdu: قائد اعظم انجینئری و ٹیکنالوجی کالج) is a private college located in Sahiwal, Punjab, Pakistan. It offers undergraduate engineering and engineering technology degree programs in affiliation with University of Engineering and Technology, Lahore

== Departments and programs ==
=== Mechanical Engineering Department ===
- BSc Mechanical Engineering
- BSc Mechanical Engineering Technology

=== Civil Engineering Department ===
- BSc Civil Engineering
- BSc Civil Engineering Technology

=== Electrical Engineering Department ===
- BSc Electrical Engineering
- BSc Electrical Engineering Technology

=== Health Sciences Department ===
- Doctor of Pharmacy
- Doctor of Physiotherapy. Fee:230000 per Year

== Student societies ==
- ASME Student Chapter QCET
- ICE QCET
- IEEE QCET
- QCET Debating Society
- QCET Dramatic and Entertainment Society
- QCET Media Society
