= Sahiwal =

Pakistani city in Punjab Province

Sahiwal ساہيوال (Punjabi)
- City
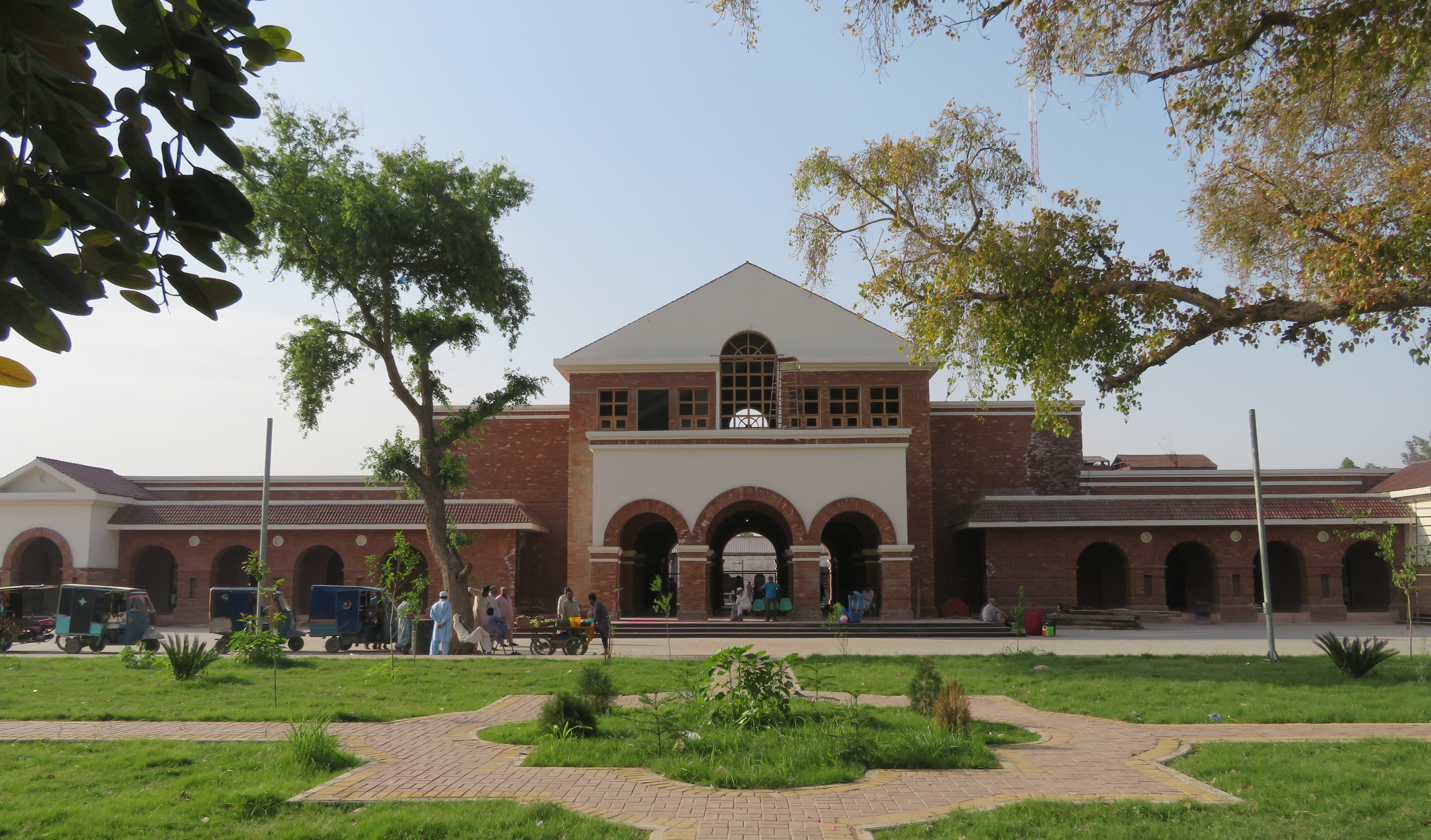
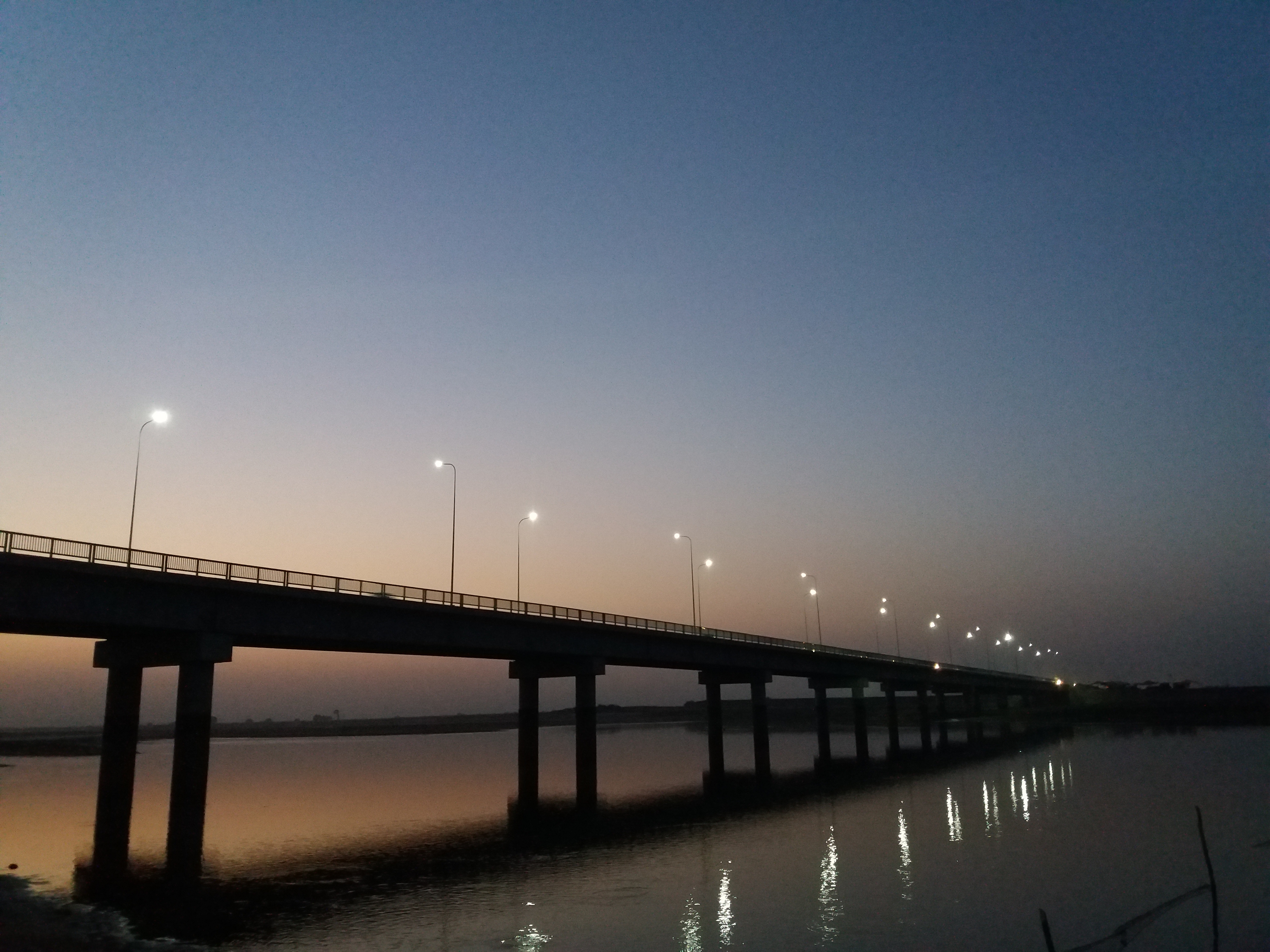
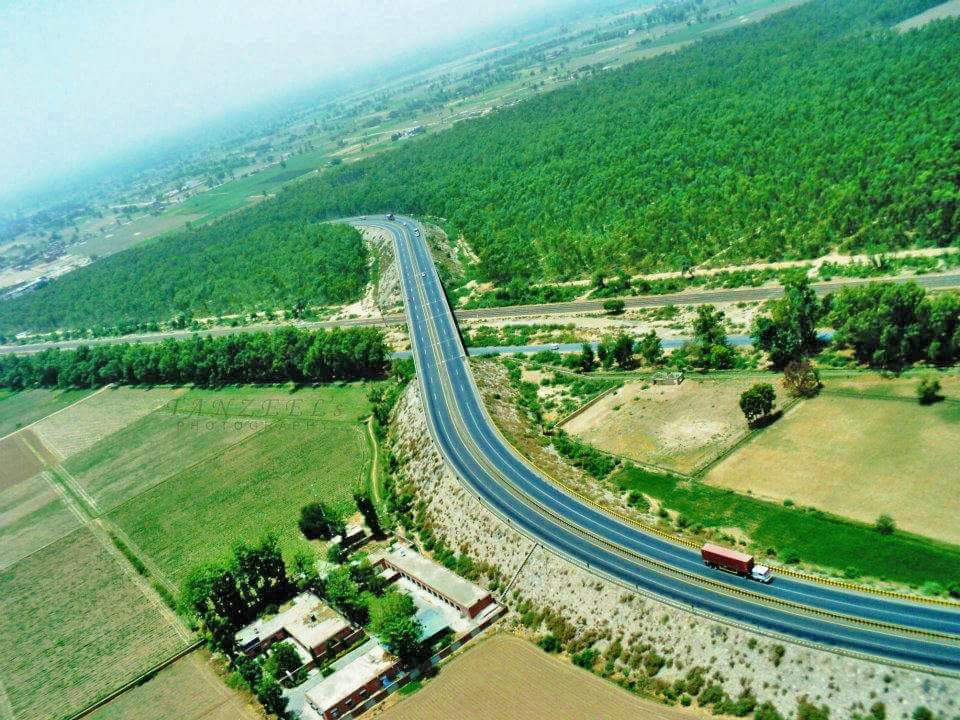
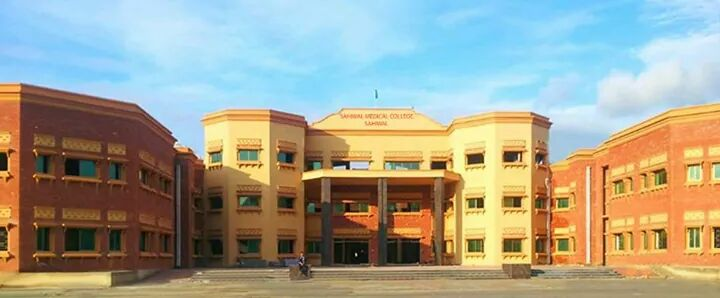
- From top to bottom: Sahiwal Railway Station, Ravi Bridge, Chichawatni Forest, Sahiwal Medical College

- Location of Sahiwal Sahiwal (Pakistan)
- Coordinates: 30°39′40″N 73°6′30″E
- Country: Pakistan
- Province: (Punjab, Pakistan) Punjab
- Division: Sahiwal
- District: Sahiwal
- Established: 1865

Government
  - Type: Metropolitan Corporation

Area
  - City: 60 km^{2} (23 sq mi)
  - Metro: 3,201 km^{2} (1,236 sq mi)
- Elevation: 152.4 m (500 ft)

Population (2023)
  - City: 538,344
  - Rank: 19th in Pakistan; 12th in Punjab
  - Density: 9,000/km^{2} (23,000/sq mi)
- Demonym(s): Sahiwalian, Sahiwali
- Time zone: UTC+5 (PST)
- Postal code: 57000
- Calling code: 040
- No. of Union Councils: 52 (11 urban, 41 rural)

Sahiwal (Punjabi / Urdu: ساہيوال; Punjabi pronunciation: [sä˦ʱi̯.ʋälᵊ]; Urdu pronunciation: [ˈsɑːˌɦiːˈʋɑːl]), formerly known as Montgomery in British India, is a city in central Punjab, Pakistan.

It is the administrative capital of both Sahiwal District and Sahiwal Division. It is the 19th most populous city of Pakistan, according to the 2023 census. Sahiwal is located approximately 180 km from the major city Lahore and 100 km from Faisalabad and lies between Lahore and Multan.

Sahiwal is approximately 152 meters above the sea level.

== Historical background ==
The ancient city of Harappa, one of the major Indus Valley Civilisation sites, is located just 24 kilometers (15 miles) west of Sahiwal.

The city lies in a densely populated region between the Sutlej and Ravi rivers. The principal crops are wheat, cotton, tobacco, legumes, potato and oil seeds. Cotton goods and lacquered woodwork are manufactured.

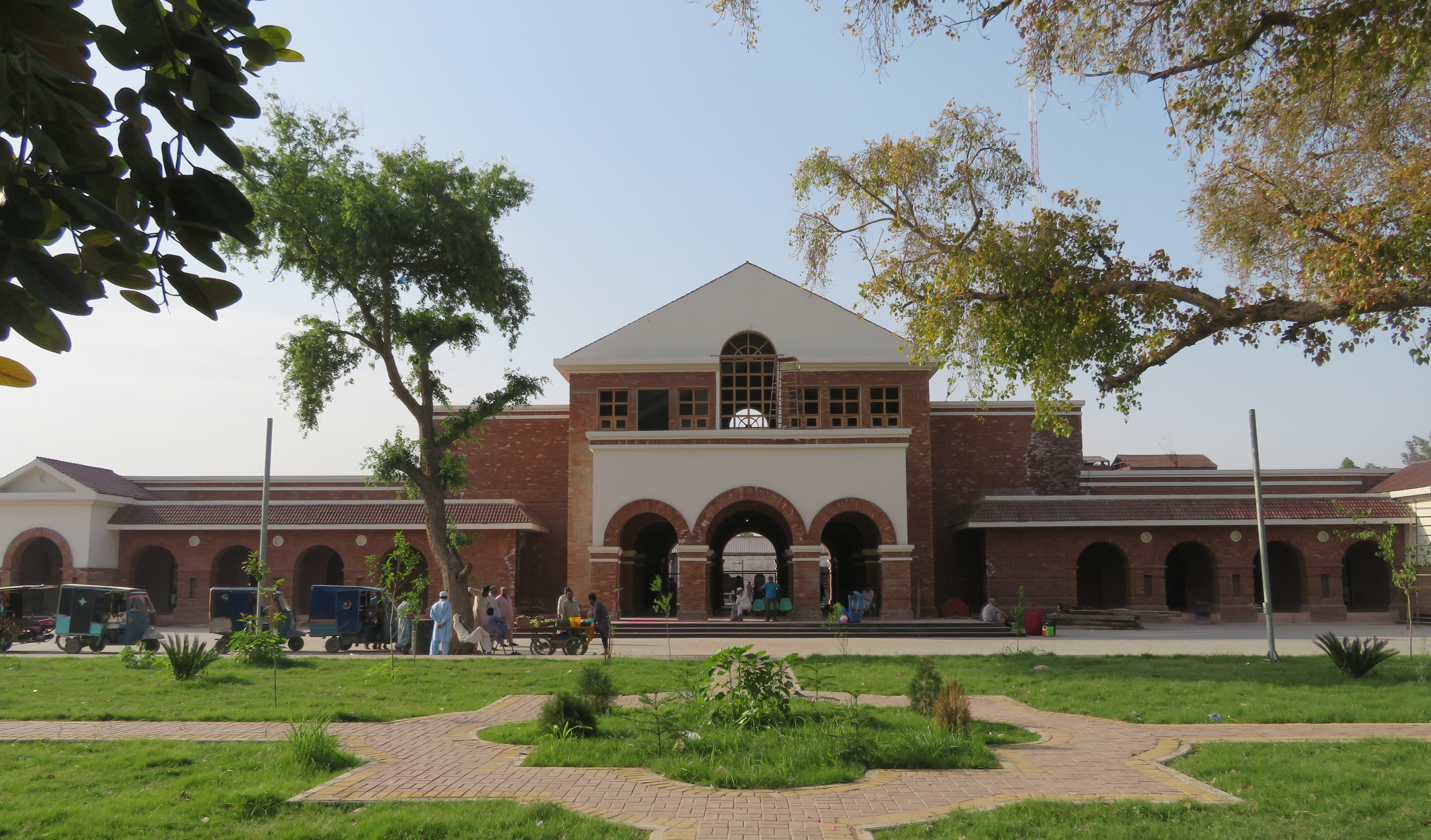
Main Railway Station

The modern-day city of Sahiwal was founded in 1865 when a train station was built at the site of a small village on the Karachi-Lahore railway line. The site was named Montgomery for Sir Robert Montgomery, then lieutenant governor of the Punjab and it replaced Gogera as the capital of the recently created Montgomery district. Two years later in 1867, it was constituted a municipality.

In 1914, construction began of the Lower Bari Doab Canal which now irrigates both the city and the wider region.

During the Partition of India in 1947 the city, being part of the Montgomery district, was allocated to Pakistan by the Punjab Boundary Commission. This was on the basis of being a Muslim-majority area, despite claims from the Indian National Congress and Sikh groups on the basis of greater property ownership and revenues paid to the state.

== Climate ==
The climate of Sahiwal district is hot semi arid, reaching 47 °C in summer, and down to 5 °C in winter. The soil of the district is very fertile. The average rainfall is about 685 mm, peaking during the summer monsoon season.

== Demographics ==
=== Population ===
Historical population

Year	Pop.	±% p.a.
1951	50,185	—
1961	75,180	+4.12%
1972	106,648	+3.23%
1981	150,954	+3.94%

Year	Pop.	±% p.a.
1998	208,778	+1.93%
2017	389,605	+3.34%
2023	538,344	+5.54%

According to the 2023 census, Sahiwal city had a population of 538,344.

=== Language ===
Urban Languages of Sahiwal MC (2023)
1. Punjabi (93.2%)
2. Urdu (5.80%)
3. Pashto (0.50%)
4. Others (0.50%)

According to the 2023 Census of Pakistan, Urban Sahiwal has an overwhelmingly Punjabi-speaking population, spoken by 93.2% of residents. Urdu forms the largest minority language, accounting for 5.2% of the population. This is followed by Pashto at 0.5%, while the remaining 0.5% consists of speakers of other languages of Pakistan. (Note: Data taken from the urban part of Sahiwal Tehsil, which includes Sahiwal MC and Harrappa TC)

== Education ==
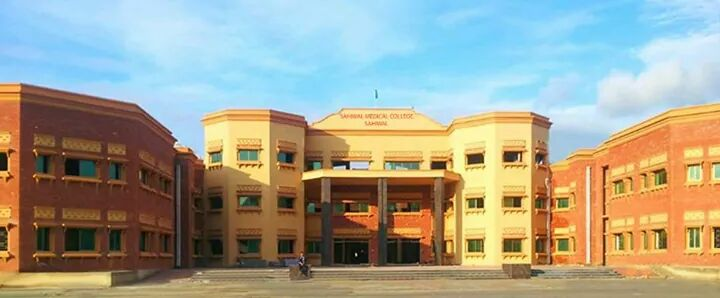
Sahiwal Medical College

Notable educational institutes of the city include:

- University of Sahiwal
- COMSATS University, Sahiwal Campus
- Barani Institute of Sciences
- Sahiwal Medical College
- Quaid-e-Azam College of Engineering and Technology, Sahiwal
- The Superior College
- Army Public Schools & Colleges System (APSCS)
- Beaconhouse School System
- The City School
- Divisional Public School and College
- The Educators
- Government Postgraduate College Sahiwal

== Twin city ==
Sahiwal is twinned with the town of Rochdale, in Greater Manchester, England. Approximately eight per cent of Rochdale's population is of Asian origin, most of whom have links with Pakistan. The twinning arrangement was agreed between Rochdale and Sahiwal in 1998.

== Notable people ==
- Mushtaq Ahmed, former test cricketer
- Imran Ali, a cricketer
- Majeed Amjad, Urdu poet
- Tariq Aziz, television anchor
- Brigadier Kuldip Singh Chandpuri, Indian Army Officer
- Dildar Pervaiz Bhatti, (TV artist, compere, comedian, anchor)
- Attash Durrani, Urdu writer and scholar
- Manzoor Elahi, former test cricketer
- Mehdi Hasan, journalist and historian
- Rana Mohammad Hanif Khan, politician and former Finance Minister of Pakistan
- Nazir Naji, journalist and Urdu columnist for various media groups
- Emmanuel Neno, Christian author and translator
- Kunwar Mohinder Singh Bedi Sahar, Urdu poet
- Nouraiz Shakoor, politician and former federal minister
- Saieen Zahoor, Sufi music folk singer
- H. K. L. Bhagat, politician and former Union Minister of Parliamentary Affairs of India

== See also ==
- Sahiwal killings
- Zafar Ali Stadium
- University of Sahiwal
