= Punjab Food Department (Pakistan) =

- محکمہ خوراک پنجاب

Department overview
- Jurisdiction: Government of Punjab, Pakistan
- Headquarters: Lahore
- Minister responsible: Bilal Yasin, Minister of Food, Punjab
- Department executive: Muhammad Usman, Food Secretary
- Website: https://food.punjab.gov.pk/

The Punjab Food Department is a department of Government of Punjab, Pakistan. It is responsible for regulating business of food grains which include purchase, storage, sales and milling.

== Functions ==
Functions of the Food Department are:

- Procurement of wheat for issuance to the mills
- Ensure Food Security in wheat and wheat products
- Transportation from surplus to deficit regions
- Protection of wheat from pest and other hazards
- Undertaking all activity related to export of wheat up to supply at port

== Attached Departments ==
- Ministry of National Food Security & Research
- Punjab Agriculture Department
- Punjab Food Authority
