= Farmers Association of Pakistan =

Farmers Association of Pakistan (FAP), also known as the SME Farmers Association of Pakistan, is a farmers' organization based in Pakistan, described as "the most prominent lobbying organization of landlords". It is one of the more than twenty organizations that form part of the Pakistan Kissan Rabta Committee.

As of 2018, Shah Mehmood Qureshi was the president of the FAP.
