= 2015 Punjab local government elections =

Pakistani Punjab elections

2015 Punjab Local Government Elections
22 May 2015
Candidate	Pakistan Muslim League-Nawaz (PML-N)	Pakistan Tehreek-e-Insaf (PTI)	Pakistan Peoples Party (PPP)
Candidate	Independents

The 2015 Punjab local government elections were held in the Punjab province of Pakistan on 22 May 2015. The elections were held for the first time in 22 years and were the first to be held under the Local Government Act 2013. The elections were won by the Pakistan Muslim League-Nawaz (PML-N), which won a majority of seats in the provincial assembly and the district councils. The Pakistan Tehreek-e-Insaf (PTI) came second, followed by the Pakistan Peoples Party (PPP).

== Results ==
The results of the 2015 Punjab local government elections:

Party	Seats won in the provincial assembly	Seats won in district councils
Pakistan Muslim League-Nawaz (PML-N)	371	1,143
Pakistan Tehreek-e-Insaf (PTI)	160	491
Pakistan Peoples Party (PPP)	105	363
Independents	101	202
