= School Education Department (Punjab, Pakistan) =

Government Department in Punjab, Pakistan

Punjab School Education Department
- اداره تعلیم مدارس پنجاب
- Headquarters: Lahore, Punjab, Pakistan
- Region served: Punjab
- Secretary Schools: Muddassir Riaz Malik
- Website: schools.punjab.gov.pk

The School Education Department is a division of the Government of Punjab, Pakistan, legislating, formulating policy, and planning for primary, middle, secondary and higher secondary education and maintain standards of education in these fields.

== Autonomous Bodies ==
=== Punjab Education Curriculum Training and Assessment Authority (PECTAA) ===
In 2025, the Punjab government formed a unified regulatory body, PECTAA, by merging three institutions, the Punjab Examination Commission, the Punjab Curriculum and Textbook Board, and Quaid-e-Azam Academy of Educational Development.

=== Punjab Education Foundation (PEF) ===
The Punjab Education Foundation was established in 1991 as an autonomous statutory body to encourage and promote education in the private sector operating on non-profit basis.

== See also ==
- Education in Pakistan
- Punjab Higher Education Commission
- Higher education department (Punjab, Pakistan)
- Special education department (Punjab, Pakistan)
- Literacy & non-formal basic education department (Punjab, Pakistan)
- Punjab Education Foundation
