= University of Sahiwal =

Public university in Pakistan

- جامعہ ساہیوال
- Former names: Bahauddin Zakariya University, Multan Sub campus Sahiwal
- Type: Public
- Established: 2005
- Affiliations: Higher Education Commission (Pakistan)
- Chancellor: Governor of the Punjab
- Vice-Chancellor: Javaid Akhtar
- Location: Farid Town Rd, Sahiwal, Punjab, Pakistan
- Campus: 57 acres
- Website: uosahiwal.edu.pk

The University of Sahiwal (Urdu: جامعۂ ساہیوال) is a first public university located in Sahiwal, Punjab, Pakistan.

== History & overview ==
In January 2005, Bahauddin Zakariya University, Multan (BZU) established a sub-campus in Sahiwal inaugurated by the then Governor of the Punjab in 2005. In 2015, Provincial Assembly of the Punjab passed an act under which sub-campus was upgraded to a full-fledged university named University of Sahiwal.

== Academics ==
The university offers degree programs in the following disciplines:

- Computer Science
- Information Technology
- Software Engineering
- English
- Business Administration
- Economics
- Commerce
- Applied Psychology
- Chemistry
- Physics
- Law
- Statistics
- Mathematics

== See also ==
- Government College Women University, Sialkot
- Government College Women University, Faisalabad
- University of Okara
- Government Sadiq College Women University, Bahawalpur
- Women University Multan
