= Agriculture department (Punjab, Pakistan) =

Ministry of Punjab, Pakistan

Agriculture Department
- محکمہ زراعت

Department overview
- Jurisdiction: Government of Punjab, Pakistan
- Headquarters: Lahore
- Annual budget: Rs.15674.9 m (Development); Rs.10199.88 m (Non-Development) (2023-24)
- Minister responsible: Ashiq Husain Khan, Minister of Agriculture, Punjab
- Department executive: Nadir Chattha, Agriculture Secretary
- Website: https://www.agripunjab.gov.pk/

The Agriculture Department is a department of the Government of Punjab, Pakistan. It is responsible for legislation, policy formulation, and development of agriculture sector in Punjab.

== Attached Departments ==
=== Regional Agricultural Economic Development Centre ===
Regional Agricultural Economic Development Centre (RAEDC) Vehari was established in 1991. The purpose of this Center is to upgrade the technical skills of farmers as well as employees of Agriculture Department through imparting training in the related disciplines.

=== Planning and Evaluation Cell ===
Planning and Evaluation Cell was established in 1981-82 to deal with all technical matters regarding foreign funded projects. The organization makes liaison with Donors, Provincial & Federal Governments for seeking technical and financial assistance.

=== Directorate General Agriculture Extension & Adaptive Research ===
Main aim is transfer of technology, monitoring of Agriculture inputs, implementation of Agricultural Laws and execution of Development Projects. Field Extension services, District Demonstration, Seed and Adaptive Research farms, and Agriculture Training Institutes in Punjab are being run by this Directorate General

=== Directorate General Agriculture Pest Warning & Quality Control of Pesticides ===
Directorate General of Pest Warning & Quality Control of Pesticides Punjab responsible for monitoring of pest development and executing all the plant protection activities throughout the Punjab province.

=== Directorate General Agriculture On Farm Water Management ===
The objective of OFWM is to maximize crop and water productivity by ensuring efficient conveyance, application and use of irrigation water viz-a-viz promoting improved water management interventions through user participation.

=== Directorate General Agriculture Field ===
Directorate General Agriculture Field provides engineering services to the farmers and other stakeholders in the areas including land leveling/development, well drilling, soil & water conservation, research & development related to agriculture machinery with highly skilled labour. The department is also maintaining agricultural engineering workshops throughout the Punjab for repair & maintenance of bulldozers, well drilling machinery and transport vehicles.

=== Directorate of Agriculture Economics & Marketing ===
The objective of the department is to increase the producers share in consumers rupee. The department conducts, publishes and disseminates commodity survey and marketing research reports. Directorate of Agriculture (E&M) has establish Agriculture Marketing Information Service (AMIS). The AMIS is aimed at enhancement of efficiency in marketing system through provision of market information to the growers and other marketing stakeholders i.e. traders, processors, exporters, importers, consumers and policy makers. Moreover, AMIS provides efficient flow of market information which enabling the producer to optimize their resource allocation to more enterprises. Further, real-time information on prices and marketing flows assisting in efficient flow of commodities between surplus and deficit areas resulting in better incomes for the producers and stable prices for the consumers. Similarly matching production with demand by making the farmer aware about seasonal price and demand pattern. Agriculture Marketing Information System (Punjab) is a help for the traders and producers to decide where, when and at what rate to sell their produce, resulting in optimization of profits and additional means to invest in further enhancement of production. To achieve the said objective, a website www.amis.pk has been developed which is connected with 135 Market Committees of the province. On the website, the daily wholesale prices of 122 agricultural commodities are available in English as well as in Urdu to facilitate the visitors. It is a website with different important information like daily wholesale prices of agricultural commodities, daily arrival, agriculture statistics of the country, support prices of agriculture commodities, district wise crop data, international commodity prices, world crop data, import and export data of agricultural commodities, quality standards, pre-feasibility standards and lot of other information related to agriculture marketing. Moreover, Monthly Agriculture Marketing Roundup is being published on regular basis in which complete price and supply analysis is given for the information of growers, traders, exporters, importers and policy makers. For access through mobile phone, an Android-based application named AMIS PUNJAB has been published on Google Play to help user fetch daily wholesale prices as per choice.

=== Directorate of Agriculture Crop Reporting Services ===
Prepares production estimation of the cultivated crops.

=== Directorate of Agriculture Information ===
Responsible to disseminate information through effective use of print and electronic media for transfer of technology to enhance agricultural productivity.

=== Directorate of Agriculture Floriculture ===
Directorate of floriculture is working for the improvement of floriculture in Punjab by conducting research on different aspects of commercial Floriculture crops and imparting training to Public in the field of floriculture and landscaping.

== Autonomous bodies ==
=== Punjab Seed Corporation ===
Punjab Seed Corporation (PSC) is a semi autonomous body of the Department, for systematic production, procurement, processing and marketing of crops seed on scientific lines.

=== Punjab Agricultural Research Board ===
Punjab Agricultural Research Board (PARB) is an autonomous body of department for research planning and efficient allocation of research resource so that the agriculture innovation system of the province can generate appropriate solutions.

== See also ==
- Ministry of National Food Security & Research
- Agriculture in Pakistan
- Punjab Food Department
- Forestry, Wildlife and Fisheries department, Punjab
- Punjab Irrigation Department
