= Punjab Higher Education Commission =

- کمیشن تعلیم عالی پنجاب
- Abbreviation: PHEC
- Established: 2015
- Location: Lahore, Punjab, Pakistan
- Parent organisation: Higher Education Department
- Website: punjabhec.gov.pk

The Punjab Higher Education Commission (PHEC) is an autonomous body of the Higher Education Department. PHEC functions are to improve the quality of higher education and recognition of higher education institutions (HEIs), both public and private sector in the Punjab. It was established in 2015. The PHEC Ordinance was approved in October 2014 and the “Punjab Higher Education Commission Act 2014” was passed in January 2015.

== Current chairperson ==
Prof. Dr. Iqrar Ahmad Khan (HI,SI) is the current Chairperson of Punjab Higher Education Commission.
