= Constituency NA-145 =

Constituency NA-145 may refer to two constituencies in the National Assembly of Pakistan:

- NA-145 Khanewal-II
- NA-145 (Pakpattan-I), a new constituency after 2018 delimitation that covers the entire Pakpattan
- NA-145 (Okara-III), a former constituency based on 2002 delimitation
