= Higher Education Department =

Higher Education Department (HED) is a department of Government of Punjab, Pakistan. Higher Education Department is responsible for education, learning and related services for students, as well as teaching and non-teaching staff, serving in public and private higher education institutions in the Punjab.

== Functions ==
The department has administrative and financial control over the Higher Education sector in the Punjab. It manages 517 colleges in 37 districts. The department also supervises 09 boards of intermediate and secondary education and public and private sector universities and degree awarding institutes in the Punjab.

== Directorate of Public Instruction Colleges ==
Directorate of Public Instruction Colleges (Punjab) is an attached department that performs a coordinating role between the secretariat and the district education office. Besides that there are also Directors at division level and deputy directors at district level. The Director has to monitor public and private colleges at division level and the deputy directors at district level.

== Boards ==
The Higher Education Department has a network of 09 Boards of Intermediate and Secondary Education to cater to the examination of Intermediate classes in public and private sector colleges across Punjab

- Board of Intermediate and Secondary Education, Lahore
- Board of Intermediate and Secondary Education, Gujranwala
- Board of Intermediate and Secondary Education, Faisalabad
- Board of Intermediate and Secondary Education, Sargodha
- Board of Intermediate and Secondary Education, Rawalpindi
- Board of Intermediate and Secondary Education, Bahawalpur
- Board of Intermediate and Secondary Education, Multan
- Board of Intermediate and Secondary Education, Dera Ghazi Khan
- Board of Intermediate and Secondary Education, Sahiwal

== See also ==
- Ministry of Federal Education and Professional Training
- Education in Pakistan
- Higher Education Commission (Pakistan)
- School education department (Punjab, Pakistan)
- Special education department (Punjab, Pakistan)
- Literacy & non-formal basic education department (Punjab, Pakistan)
