= Government of Punjab, Pakistan =

Government of the Punjab: حکومت پنجاب; Hukūmat-e-Panjāb
- Provincial Government
- Emblem of Punjab Flag of Punjab
- Formation: 15 August 1947 (West Punjab); 1 July 1970 (current form)
- Constitutional instrument: Constitution of Pakistan
- Province: Punjab
- Country: Pakistan
- Website: punjab.gov.pk

Legislative branch
- Legislature: Provincial Assembly of the Punjab
- Speaker: Malik Ahmad Khan
- Deputy Speaker: Zaheer Iqbal Channar
- Assembly members: Members of the Punjab Assembly (MPA)
- Meeting place: Punjab Assembly Building (Shahrah-e-Quaid-e-Azam, Lahore)

Executive branch
- Governor: Saleem Haider Khan
- Chief Minister: Maryam Nawaz
- Chief Secretary: Zahid Akhtar Zaman
- Headquarters: Lahore
- Main organ: Cabinet

Judicial branch
- Court: Lahore High Court
- Chief Justice: Aalia Neelum
- Seat: Lahore (principal seat) (Note: Circuit benches: Bahawalpur, Multan, Rawalpindi)
- Appeals from: District courts of Punjab

The Government of the Punjab (Punjabi/Saraiki/Urdu: حکومت پنجاب, romanised: Hukūmat-e-Panjāb) is the legal authority of the Pakistani province of Punjab, based in its capital Lahore. It has authority over its 41 districts, with powers and structure set out in the national constitution. The government is composed of three branches — legislative, executive, and judicial. The Punjab Assembly serves as the unicameral legislative authority of the province, and elects the chief minister to head the government, executive, and their appointed cabinet – which is aided by the chief secretary, who serves as the bureaucratic chief and highest-ranking administrative officer of the province. The Governor, appointed by the federal government, serves as the ceremonial head of province. The Lahore High Court, headed by its Chief Justice, is the highest court in the province's judiciary, having supreme appellate jurisdiction over all provincial cases.

The Punjab province is the country's most populous region and is home to the Punjabis and various other groups. Neighbouring provinces of Pakistan are Sindh to the south, Balochistan to the south-west and the Khyber Pakhtunkhwa to the north-west, as well as Azad Jammu and Kashmir to the north and Islamabad Capital Territory to the north-west. It also shares International border with Indian states of Punjab and Rajasthan to the east and Indian-administered Jammu and Kashmir to the north. The main languages are Punjabi and Urdu and the provincial capital is Lahore. The name Punjab literally translates from Persian into the words 'Panj' (پانج) five, and 'Aab' (آب) water respectively, which can be translated as "five water" (hence the poetic name land of the five rivers), referring to the Beas, Ravi, Sutlej, Chenab and Jhelum rivers. Part of the Indus river also lies in Punjab, but it is not considered one of the "five" rivers.

== Departments ==
There are 41 departments in the Punjab government. Each Department is headed by a provincial Minister (elected member of the provincial assembly) and a provincial Secretary (a civil servant of usually BPS-20, 21, or BPS-22). All ministers and Secretaries report to the Chief Minister and Chief Secretary, who are the Chief Executive. The Chief Secretary Punjab is a BPS-22 grade bureaucrat. The Chief Secretary is appointed by the Prime Minister of Pakistan.

In addition to these departments, there are several autonomous bodies and attached departments that report directly to either the Secretaries or the Chief Secretary. For better management, Sub Secretariat and Additional Inspector General (IG) South Punjab office in Multan was established by the government.

=== List of departments ===
- Planning & Development Board
  - Planning & Development Department
- Services & General Administration Department
  - Services Wing
  - Implementation & Coordination Wing
  - Regulations Wing
  - Archives & Libraries Wing
  - Global Investment & Gateway of Punjab Wing
  - Enhancing Delivery & Government Efficiency Wing
- Anti-Corruption Establishment
- Local Government and Community Development Department
- Home Department
- Chief Minister's Inspection, Enquiries & Implementation Team
- Food Department
- Finance Department
- Energy Department
- Health Department
- Communication and Works Department
- Culture, Tourism, Antiquities & Archives Department
- Works and Services Department
- Punjab Information and Culture Department
  - Punjab Council of Arts
- Excise and taxation department
- Population Welfare Department
- Labour & Human Resources Department
- Law & Parliamentary Affairs Department
- Irrigation Department
- Livestock and Dairy Development Department
- Highway Department
- Agriculture Department
- Literacy & non-formal basic education department
- Forestry, Wildlife and Fisheries department
- Information, Science & Technology Department
- Cooperative Department
- Women Development Department
- Transport & Mass Transit Department
- Industries, commerce and investment department
- Human Settlement Department
- Social Welfare Department
- Mines & Minerals Development Department
- Rehabilitation Department
- Sports & Youth Affairs Department
- Housing, Urban Development, and Public Health Engineering Department
- Higher Education Department
- School Education Department
- Environment, Climate Change & Coastal Development Department
- Punjab Police
- Auqaf and Religious Affairs Department
- Human Rights and Minorities Affairs Department

=== Autonomous Bodies and Attached Departments ===
- Punjab Enforcement and Regulatory Authority
- Punjab Information Technology Board
- Punjab Prisons (Pakistan)
- Punjab Higher Education Commission
- Punjab Commission on the Status of Women
- Punjab Land Records Authority
- Punjab Masstransit Authority
- Punjab Public Service Commission
- Punjab Food Authority
- Punjab Forensic Science Agency
- Punjab Safe Cities Authority
- Punjab Housing and Town Planning Agency
- Punjab Employees Social Security Institution
- Punjab Disaster Management Authority
- Sports Board Punjab
- Water and Sanitation Agency

== Legislature ==
The Punjab Assembly is a unicameral legislature with 297 elected members, 66 seats reserved for women and 8 seats reserved for non-Muslims)

== VIP Aircraft ==
These aircraft are used for official VIP transport.

Aircraft	Image	Quantity	Reg.	Note
Gulfstream G500		1	J72002	
Hawker 400		1	AP-BHQ	
Mil Mi-17		1	AP-BNS	

== See also ==
- Governor of Punjab, Pakistan
- Chief Minister of Punjab (Pakistan)
- Speaker of the Provincial Assembly of Punjab
- Leader of the Opposition Punjab
- Chief Secretary Punjab
