= Government College Women University Faisalabad =

Public university in Pakistan

- گورنمنٹ کالج وؤمن یونیورسٹی فیصل آباد
- Other names: GCWUF
- Motto: Knowledge is Empowerment
- Type: Public college university
- Established: 3 January 2013
- Accreditation: Higher Education Commission
- Chancellor: Governor of the Punjab
- Vice-Chancellor: Robina Farooq Qureshi
- Location: Faisalabad, Punjab, Pakistan

The Government College Women University Faisalabad (GCWUF) (Urdu: گورنمنٹ کالج وؤمن یونیورسٹی فیصل آباد) is a Pakistani university located in Faisalabad, Punjab.

== Recognised university ==
The university is recognised by the Higher Education Commission of Pakistan.

== History ==
The university began as an intermediate college in 1934. It was promoted to a degree college in 1944. Postgraduate disciplines were introduced in 1985. It was granted the status of a university on 3 January 2013. The university is situated near Jaranwala Road, not far from the historical Ghanta Ghar clock tower of Faisalabad. The university seeks to cater to the educational needs of more than six million people of the city and around the same number from the surrounding districts.

The university offers degrees in various disciplines. It is a hub of educational, social and cultural activities having a close relation with business and industrial communities. On two campuses, the main and the new campus, more than 8,000 students are enrolled.

== Mission ==
The university's mission is to provide students with a free environment where dialogue is encouraged and ideas are imagined through the co-operation of public and private organisations and sectors.

== Programs ==
The university offers undergraduate and postgraduate programs in the following disciplines:

=== Arts and humanities ===
- English
- Urdu and Persian
- Education
- Mass communication
- Statistics
- Applied psychology
- Geography
- Home economics and fine arts
- History

=== Business and social sciences ===
- Commerce
- Economics
- Business

=== Science and technology ===
- Mathematics
- Biology
- Chemistry
- Bio-chemistry
- Physics
- Information technology
