= Engineering education in Pakistan =

In Pakistan, the engineering education is primarily taught at public and private universities and it is regulated by the Pakistan Engineering Council.

Following public and private engineering institutions are there in Pakistan:

== Islamabad ==
- Abasyn University, Peshawar, Islamabad Campus
- Air University, Islamabad
- Bahria University, Islamabad (Main Campus)
- Sir Syed CASE Institute of Technology Islamabad
- COMSATS University Islamabad (Main Campus)
- Federal Urdu University of Arts, Science & Technology, Islamabad (Main Campus)
- Hamdard Institute of Engineering and Technology, Islamabad Campus (Hamdard University, Karachi)
- Institute of Space Technology, Islamabad
- National University of Sciences and Technology (Pakistan), Islamabad
- International Islamic University, Islamabad
- Islamic International Engineering College, Islamabad (Riphah International University, Islamabad)
- Iqra University, Islamabad Campus (Iqra University, Karachi)
- Capital University of Science & Technology, Islamabad
- National University of Computer and Emerging Sciences, Islamabad (Main Campus)
- National University of Modern Languages, Islamabad (Main Campus)
- Pakistan Institute of Engineering and Applied Sciences, Islamabad
- Grafton College, Islamabad
- National University of Technology
- IBADAT International University, Islamabad

== Punjab ==
- COMSATS University Islamabad (Sahiwal Campus)
- National University of Modern Languages, Rawalpindi Campus
- Dr. A. Q. Khan Institute of Computer Sciences and Information Technology, Rawalpindi
- COMSATS University Islamabad (Lahore Campus)
- Sharif College of Engineering and Technology, Lahore affiliated with University of Engineering and Technology, Lahore
- COMSATS University Islamabad (Wah Campus)
- National University of Sciences and Technology (Pakistan), College of Electrical and Mechanical Engineering, Rawalpindi Campus
- HITEC University, Taxila Cantonment
- Information Technology University (Lahore)
- Institute of Advanced Materials, Bahauddin Zakariya University, Multan
- Lahore University of Management Sciences, Lahore
- National University of Sciences and Technology (Pakistan), Military College of Signals, Rawalpindi Campus
- National Textile University, Faisalabad (Main Campus)
- National University of Computer and Emerging Sciences, Islamabad, (Lahore Campus)
- National University of Computer and Emerging Sciences, Islamabad, (Chiniot Campus)
- NFC Institute of Engineering and Fertilizer Research, Faisalabad affiliated with (University of Engineering and Technology, Lahore)
- NFC Institute of Engineering and Technology, Multan)
- Swedish College of Engineering and Technology, Rahim Yar Khan affiliated with University of Engineering and Technology, Lahore
- Swedish College of Engineering And Technology, Wah Cantonment affiliated with University of Engineering and Technology, Taxila
- University of Management and Technology, Lahore
- University of Central Punjab, Lahore
- The University of Lahore, Lahore (Main Campus)
- University College of Engineering and Technology, Multan (Bahauddin Zakariya University, Multan)
- Bahauddin Zakariya University College of Textile Engineering, Multan (Bahauddin Zakariya University, Multan)
- University College of Engineering and Technology, Bahawalpur (Islamia University, Bahawalpur)
- University of Agriculture, Faisalabad
- University of Engineering and Technology, Taxila
- University of Chakwal
- University of Engineering and Technology, Lahore (Main Campus)
- University of Engineering and Technology, Kala Shah Kaku Campus
- University of Engineering and Technology Faisalabad Campus
- University of Engineering and Technology, Lahore (Narowal Campus)
- Rachna College of Engineering and Technology, Gujranwala constituent college of University of Engineering and Technology, Lahore
- University of Faisalabad, Faisalabad
- University of Gujrat, Gujrat
- University of Wah, Wah Cantonment
- Muhammad Nawaz Sharif University of Engineering and Technology, Multan
- Lahore Leads University
- University College of Engineering & Technology, University of Sargodha
- Khawaja Fareed University of Engineering and Information Technology, Rahim Yar Khan
- Quaid-e-Azam College of Engineering and Technology, Sahiwal
- University of South Asia, Lahore
- Namal University, Mianwali
- Government College University, Lahore
- Government College University, Faisalabad
- Minhaj University, Lahore
- Imperial College of Business Studies, Lahore
- Lahore College for Women University, Lahore
- University of the Punjab, Lahore
- Institute of Southern Punjab
- Green International University, Lahore
- Superior University
- University of Management and Technology, Lahore, Sialkot Campus
- Grand Asian University, Sialkot

== Khyber Pakhtunkhwa ==
- CECOS University of Information Technology and Emerging Sciences, Peshawar
- Qurtuba University, Dera Ismail Khan
- National University of Sciences and Technology (Pakistan), College of Aeronautical Engineering, Risalpur Campus
- COMSATS University Islamabad (Abbottabad Campus)
- City University of Science and Information Technology, Peshawar
- Gandhara Institute of Science and Technology, PGS Engineering College (University of Engineering and Technology, Peshawar)
- Ghulam Ishaq Khan Institute of Engineering Sciences and Technology, Topi, Khyber Pakhtunkhwa - Swabi
- IQRA National University, Peshawar
- National University of Sciences and Technology (Pakistan), Military College of Engineering (Pakistan), Risalpur Campus
- National University of Computer and Emerging Sciences, Islamabad (Peshawar Campus)
- University of Engineering and Technology, Peshawar (Main Campus)
- University of Engineering and Technology, Peshawar (Jalozai Campus)
- University of Engineering and Technology, Peshawar (Bannu Campus)
- University of Engineering and Technology, Peshawar (Abbottabad Campus)
- University of Engineering and Technology, Peshawar (Kohat Campus)
- Peshawar College of Engineering, Peshawar (University of Engineering and Technology, Peshawar)
- Sarhad University of Science and Information Technology, Peshawar
- Abasyn University, Peshawar (Main Campus)
- Gomal University, Dera Ismail Khan
- University of Engineering and Technology, Mardan
- Pak-Austria Fachhochschule: Institute of Applied Sciences and Technology, Haripur
- University of Engineering and Applied Sciences, Swat

== Sindh ==
- Muhammad Ali Jinnah University, Karachi
- Habib University, Karachi
- Shaheed Zulfiqar Ali Bhutto Institute of Science and Technology, Karachi
- Bahria University, Islamabad (Karachi Campus)
- Dawood University of Engineering and Technology, Karachi
- Hamdard Institute of Engineering & Technology, Karachi (Hamdard University, Karachi)
- Iqra University, Karachi (Main Campus)
- Indus University, Karachi
- DHA Suffa University, Karachi
- Institute of Business Management, Karachi
- Institute of Industrial Electronics Engineering, Karachi (NED University of Engineering and Technology, Karachi)
- Mehran University of Engineering and Technology, Jamshoro
- Mehran University College of Engineering and Technology, Shaheed Zulfiqar Ali Bhutto Campus, Khairpur Mirs (Mehran University of Engineering and Technology, Jamshoro)
- National University of Computer and Emerging Sciences, Islamabad (Karachi Campus)
- NED University of Engineering and Technology, Karachi
- National University of Sciences and Technology (Pakistan), Pakistan Navy Engineering College, Karachi
- Karachi Institute of Economics and Technology (PAF-KIET), Karachi
- Quaid-e-Awam University of Engineering, Science and Technology, Nawabshah
- Quaid-e-Awam University College of Engineering, Science and Technology, Larkana (Quaid-e-Awam University of Engineering, Science and Technology, Nawabshah)
- Thar Institute of Engineering, Science, and Technology, Tharparkar (NED University of Engineering & Technology, Karachi)
- Sir Syed University of Engineering and Technology, Karachi
- Sindh Agriculture University, Tando Jam
- National Textile University, Faisalabad (Karachi Campus)
- Sukkur IBA University, Sukkur
- UIT University, Karachi
- University of Karachi, Karachi
- Salim Habib University, Karachi
- Nazeer Hussain University, Karachi
- University of Sindh, Jamshoro
- Ziauddin University

== Balochistan ==
- Balochistan University of Engineering and Technology, Khuzdar
- Balochistan University of Information Technology, Engineering and Management Sciences, Quetta (Takatu Campus)
- National University of Sciences and Technology (Pakistan), Islamabad, Quetta Campus

== Azad Jammu and Kashmir ==
- Mirpur University of Science and Technology, Mirpur, Azad Kashmir
- University of Azad Jammu and Kashmir, Muzaffarabad, Azad Kashmir

== See also ==
- Pakistan Engineering Council
- National Technology Council (Pakistan)
- Washington Accord
- Regulation and licensure in engineering
- Higher Education Commission (Pakistan)
- List of universities in Pakistan
- List of computing schools in Pakistan
- List of business schools in Pakistan
