= List of computing schools in Pakistan =

This is a list of computing schools in Pakistan, recognized by the National Computing Education Accreditation Council (NCEAC) - Higher Education Commission (Pakistan) (HEC).

- PICT – Short Computer Courses
- SE – software engineering
- CS – computer science
- IS – information system
- IT – information technology
- CE – computer engineering
- CISE – computer and information systems engineering
- Bio-informatics

== Azad Kashmir ==
=== Mirpur ===
- Mirpur University of Science and Technology (MUST) - BS-SE

=== Muzaffarabad ===
- University of Azad Jammu and Kashmir - BS-CS, BS-SE

=== Rawalakot ===
- University of Poonch - BS-CS

== Balochistan ==
=== Quetta ===
- Balochistan University of Information Technology, Engineering and Management Sciences - BS-CS, BS-IT
- Al-Hamd Islamic University BS-CS, BS-IT

== Capital Territory ==
=== Islamabad ===
- Virtual University of Pakistan - BS-CS, BS-SE
- Air University (Pakistan Air Force)
- Bahria University - BS-CS
- Center for Advanced Studies in Engineering (CASE) - BS-CS
- COMSATS Institute of Information Technology - BS-CS
- Federal Urdu University - BS-CS
- Foundation University, Islamabad - BS-SE
- International Islamic University, Islamabad - BS-CS, BS-SE
- Institute of Space Technology -BS-CS
- Iqra University - BS-CS
- Capital University of Science & Technology - BS-CS, BS-SE
- National University of Computer and Emerging Sciences (FAST) - BS-CS
- National University of Modern Languages (NUML) - BS-CS, BS-SE
- Quaid-i-Azam University Islamabad - BS-CS, BS-IT
- Pakistan Institute of Engineering and Applied Sciences (PIEAS) - BS-CIS
- Preston University (Pakistan) - BS-CS
- Riphah International University - BS-SE
- National University of Sciences and Technology (NUST) -BS-CS
- National Skills University (NSU) -BS-CS

== Khyber Pakhtunkhwa ==
=== Peshawar ===
- University of Engineering & Technology, Peshawar - BS-CS, BS-SE
- Abasyn University - BS-CS, BS-SE
- City University of Science and Information Technology, Peshawar - BS-CS, BS-SE
- National University of Computer and Emerging Sciences (FAST) - BS-CS
- Sarhad University of Science and Information Technology - BS-CS
- Shaheed Benazir Bhutto Women University - BS-Bioinformatics
- University of Peshawar - BS-CS
- Iqra National University, Peshawar - BS-CS, BS-SE
- CECOS University - BS-CS, BS-SE

=== Abbottabad ===
- COMSATS Institute of Information Technology - BS-CS, BS-SE, BS-TN

=== Bannu ===
- University of Science and Technology (Bannu) - BS-CS, BS-SE

=== Dera Ismail Khan ===
- Gomal University - BS-CS
- Qurtuba University - BS-CS

=== Haripur ===
- University of Haripur - BS-CS
- Pak-Austria Fachhochschule: Institute of Applied Sciences and Technology - BS-CS, BS-AI

=== Mardan ===
- University of Engineering & Technology, Mardan - BS-CS

=== Swabi ===
- Ghulam Ishaq Khan Institute of Engineering Sciences and Technology - BS-CS
- University of Swabi - BS-BBA-MBA

== Punjab ==
=== Attock ===
- COMSATS Institute of Information Technology - BS-CS

=== Bahawalpur ===
- Islamia University, Bahawalpur - BS-CS, BS-IT, BS-SE

=== Faisalabad ===
- Government College University, Faisalabad - BS-CS, BS-IT, BS-SE
- National Textile University - BS-CS
- National University of Computer and Emerging Sciences-FAST-BS-CS

=== Gujranwala ===
- GIFT University - BS-CS

=== Gujrat ===
- University of Gujrat - BS-CS, BS-IT, BS-SE, M.Sc-IT, M.Sc-CS, M.Phil-IT, M.Phil-CS, PhD
- University of Lahore, Gujrat Campus - BS-CS, BS-IT, M.Sc-IT, M.Sc-CS, M.Phil-IT, M.Phil-CS

=== Lahore ===
- Lahore Garrison University, DHA Phase VI, Sector C, Avenue 4th Main Campus - BS-DF, BS-IT, BS-SE, BS-CS, MS-CS, MCS
- Bahria University, Lahore Campus - BS-IT, BS-CS
- Superior University, Lahore - BS-CS, BS-IT, BS-SE, BS-CE
- Beaconhouse National University - BS-SE
- University of South-Asia, Lahore - BS-IT, BS-CS, BS-IT, BS-SE
- COMSATS Institute of Information Technology, Lahore Campus - BS-CS
- Government College University, Lahore - BS-CS
- Lahore College for Women University - BS-CS
- National University of Computer and Emerging Sciences (FAST) - BS-CS
- Punjab University College of Information Technology (PUCIT) - BS-CS, BS-IT, BS-SE
- Institute of Business and Information Technology (IBIT), University of the Punjab - BBIT
- University of Central Punjab - BS-CS
- University of Education - BS-IT
- University of Sargodha, Lahore Campus - BS-IT
- University of Lahore - BS-CS
- University of Engineering and Technology, Lahore - BS-CS
- University of Management and Technology, Lahore - BS-CS, BS-SE
- Forman Christian College - BS-IT, BS-CS, BS-IT, BS-SE

=== Mianwali ===
- Namal College - BS-CS

=== Multan ===
- Bahauddin Zakariya University - BS-CS, BS-IT
- University of Education - BS-IT
- Air University - BS-CS
- Institute of Southern Punjab - BS-CS, BS-IT
- NFC Institute of Engineering and Technology-BS-CS, BS-IT, Software engineering

=== Rawalpindi ===
- Army Public College of Management Sciences (APCOMS) - BS-SE
- COMSATS Institute of Information Technology (Wah Cantonment Campus) - BS-CS
- National University of Sciences and Technology (Pakistan) (NUST) - BS-IT
- HITEC University, Taxila (HITEC) - BS-CS, BS-CE
- Pir Mehr Ali Shah Arid Agriculture University - BS-CS
- University of Engineering and Technology, Taxila - BS-SE
- University of Wah - BS-CS

=== Sahiwal ===
- COMSATS Institute of Information Technology - BS-CS

=== Sargodha ===
- University of Sargodha - BS-CS, BS-IT, BS-SE

== Sindh ==
=== Hyderabad ===
- Isra University - BS-CS, BS-SE
- SZABIST - BS-CS

=== Tandojam ===
- Sindh Agriculture University - BS-IT, MS-IT, MS-SE

=== Jamshoro ===
- University of Sindh - BS-CS, BS-SE, BS-IT, M.Phil - CS, M.Phil - SE, M.Phil - IT
- Mehran University of Engineering & Technology - BE-SE, BE-CS, ME-SE, ME-CIE, ME-IT

=== Karachi ===
- Bahria University - BS-CS, BS-IT
- DHA Suffa University - BS-CS
- Habib University - BS-CS
- Hamdard University - BS-CS
- Indus University - BS-CS, BS-SE, BS-IT
- Institute of Business Administration, Karachi - BS-CS
- Institute of Business & Technology (Biztek) - BS-CS
- Institute of Business Management - BS-CS
- Iqra University - BS-CS
- UIT University - BS-CS, BS-SE
- Jinnah University for Women - BS-CS, BS-SE, BS-IT
- Karachi Institute of Economics and Technology - BS-CS
- Muhammad Ali Jinnah University (MAJU) - BS-CS
- National University of Computer and Emerging Sciences (FAST) - BS-CS
- NED University of Engineering and Technology - BE-CISE, BS-CSIT, BE-SE
- Pakistan Navy Engineering College - BS-IS
- Shaheed Zulfiqar Ali Bhutto Institute of Science and Technology (SZABIST) - BS-CS
- Sindh Madrasatul Islam University (SMI) - BS-CS
- Sir Syed University of Engineering and Technology (SSUET) - BS-CS, BS-CE
- University of Karachi (KU), UBIT - BS-CS, BS-SE
- Aligarh Institute of Technology

=== Sukkur ===
- Sukkur Institute of Business Administration - BS-CS, BS-SE

== See also ==
- Education in Pakistan
- List of schools in Pakistan
