= Balochistan University of Engineering and Technology =

University in Pakistan

Balochistan University of Engineering & Technology, Khuzdar
- جامع انجنیری و فن آوری بلوچستان، خضدار د بلوچستان د انجینرۍ او ټیکنالوژۍ پوهنتون، خضدار دانشگاه مهندسی و فناوری بلوچستان، خضدار
- Other name: BUETK
- Motto: Kasbe Kamal Kun Keh Aziz-e Jahan Shavi
- Type: Public
- Established: 1987
- Accreditation: Pakistan Engineering Council, Higher Education Commission of Pakistan
- Vice-Chancellor: Dr. Maqsood Ahmed
- Location: Khuzdar, Balochistan, Pakistan; 27.8203°N 66.6272°E
- Website: www.buetk.edu.pk

The Balochistan University of Engineering & Technology, Khuzdar (BUETK) is a public university located in Khuzdar, Balochistan, Pakistan.

== Recognized university ==
Balochistan University of Engineering and Technology is recognized by the Higher Education Commission of Pakistan.

== Programs ==
The university offers the following degree programs:

- BE Civil Engineering
- BE Mechanical Engineering
- BE Electrical Engineering
- BE Electronic Engineering
- BE Bio Medical
- BE Energy System Engineering
- BE Computer Systems Engineering
- BS Computer Science
- BS Information Technology
- BS Software Engineering
- ME Civil Engineering
- ME Mechanical Engineering
- ME Electrical Engineering
- ME Computer Systems Engineering
- MS Computer Science

== See also ==
- List of engineering universities and colleges in Pakistan
- List of universities in Pakistan
  - List of universities in Islamabad
  - List of universities of Punjab, Pakistan
  - List of universities in Sindh
  - List of universities in Khyber Pakhtunkhwa
  - List of universities in Balochistan
  - List of universities in Azad Kashmir
  - List of universities in Gilgit-Baltistan
