= National University of Technology =

Public university in Islamabad, Pakistan

- دانشگاه ملی فناوری
- "UNIVERSITY FOR INDUSTRY"; Where Heads, Hearts & Hands Combine
- Motto: رہبرِ ترقی و کمال
- Motto in English: Leading Towards Progress and Excellence
- Type: Public
- Established: 2018; 8 years ago
- Founders: Engineer in Chief, Founding Rector Lt Gen. Engineer Khalid Asghar (R)
- Affiliations: Higher Education Commission; Pakistan Engineering Council, National Technology Council, Ministry of Science and Technology (Pakistan), Frontier Works Organization, National Computing Education Accreditation Council (NCEAC)
- Chancellor: President of Pakistan
- Rector: Lt Gen. Engineer Moazzam Ejaz (R) HI(M)
- Faculty: 500+
- Students: 1500+
- Undergraduates: 1200+
- Postgraduates: 300+
- Other students: Skills Courses Enrolled Students 300+
- Location: Islamabad, Islamabad Capital Territory, 44000, Pakistan; 33.626335056470296°N 73.01154183788083°E
- Campus: Urban
- Colors: Maroon, Gray, Sky Blue, Dark Blue
- Nickname: NUTECH
- Website: nutech.edu.pk

The National University of Technology (NUTECH) is a public university located in Islamabad, Pakistan.

== History ==
It was established in 2017 as an affiliate university of the Frontier Works Organization (FWO), a department of Pakistan Army.

== Programs ==
The university offers the following degree programs:

- BS Mechanical Engineering (Since 2018)
- BS Electrical Engineering (Since 2018)
- BS Civil Engineering (Since 2018)
- BS Computer Engineering (Since 2018)
- BS Computer Science (Since 2018)
- BS Artificial Intelligence (Since 2022)
- BS Software Engineering (Since 2023)
- BS Civil Engineering Technology (Since 2021)
- BS Cyber Security Since 2024
- BS Information Technology Since 2024
- MS Civil Engineering (Since 2022)
- MS Computer Science (Since 2022)
- MS Computer Engineering (Since 2023)
- 20+ Emerging Skills Short Courses

== See also ==
- List of engineering universities and colleges in Pakistan
