= National Textile University =

University in Faisalabad, Punjab, Pakistan

- (جامعہِ قومی ٹیکسٹائل
- Other name: NTU
- Former names: Institute of Textile Technology; National College of Textile Engineering
- Motto: "Innovate and lead"
- Type: Public
- Established: 1959
- Accreditation: Higher Education Commission; Pakistan Engineering Council; Washington Accord; National Technology Council; National Business Education Accreditation Council; National Computing Education Accreditation Council
- Academic affiliations: University of Engineering and Technology, Lahore
- Rector: Rashid Masood
- Chancellor: President of Pakistan
- Faculty: Over 100
- Undergraduates: Over 1000 students (per annum)
- Postgraduates: Over 150 students (per annum)
- Location: Faisalabad, Punjab, Pakistan
- Colors: Maroon & blue
- Website: ntu.edu.pk

The National Textile University (NTU) (Urdu: (جامعہِ قومی ٹیکسٹائل) is a public university located in Faisalabad, Punjab, Pakistan. It is a premier institute of textile education in Pakistan.

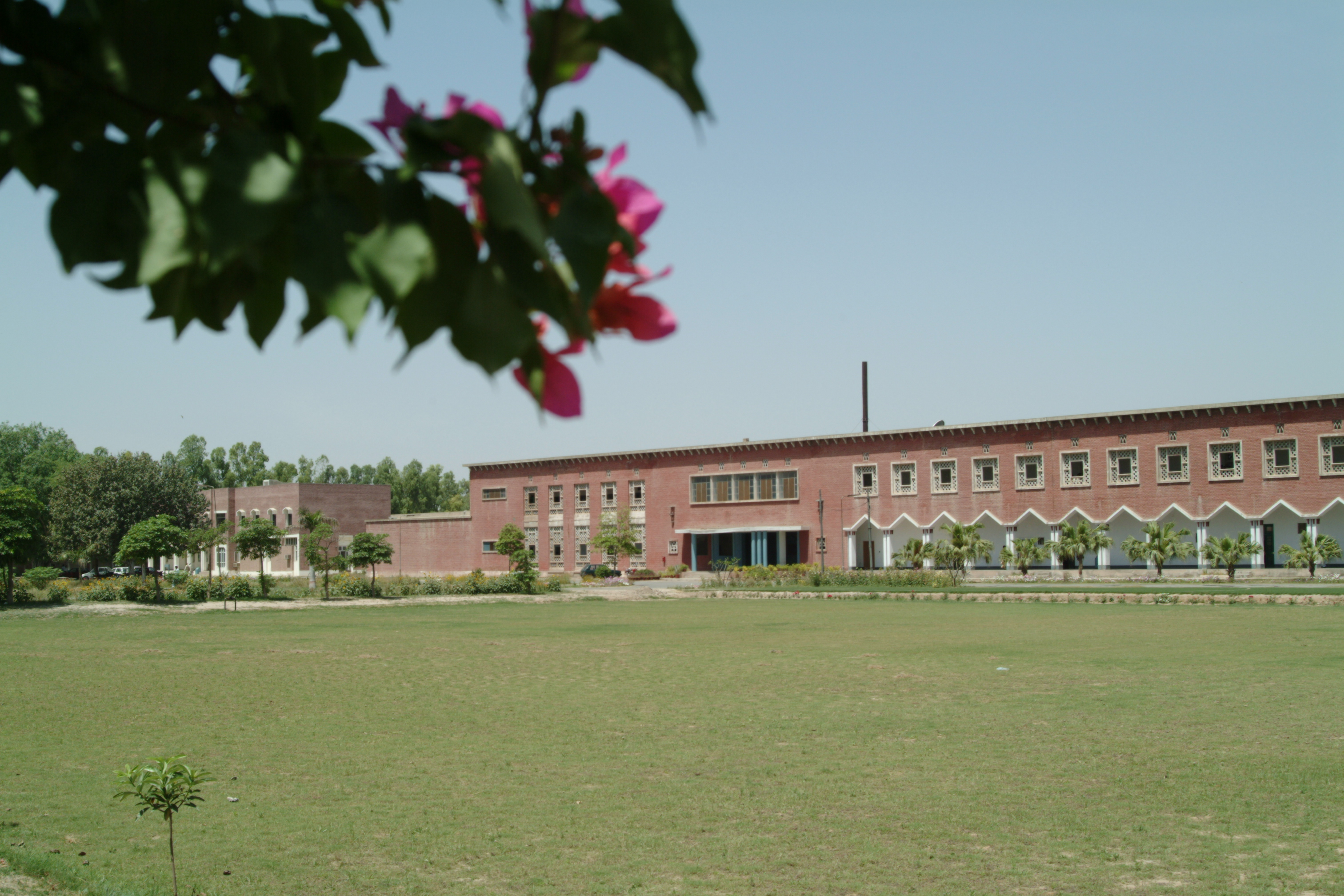
National Textile University

== Overview ==
The campus is spread over 162 acres (66 ha). The university is in the outskirts of city of Faisalabad, about 12 km (7.5 mi) from the city center on Sheikhupura road.

== Accreditations ==
National Textile University is accredited by the Pakistan Engineering Council, Washington Accord, National Technology Council (Pakistan), National Computing Education Accreditation Council, National Business Education Accreditation Council and recognized by the Higher Education Commission of Pakistan (HEC).

== History ==
The idea of establishing a Textile Institute of world fame was conceived by a group of visionary industrialists in 1954. To realise this idea the Government of Punjab joined hands with the leading textile industrialists to form an Institute of Textile Technology in Faisalabad (then Lyallpur) and provided sixty-two acres of state-owned land free of cost. Kohinoor Industries, Colony Textile Mills, The Dawood Foundation and Lyallpur Cotton Mills provided funds to the tune of Rs.2.5 millions, which were utilised for the construction of building and provision of other infrastructure. The Government of U.K. provided the bulk of equipment and machinery, along with the services of experts under the Colombo Plan. General Muhammad Ayub Khan, the then President of Pakistan, laid the foundation stone of the Institute, on the 12th of October 1959.

A Board of Trustees, with the Minister of Industries as chairman and nominees of the donor companies as members was constituted to manage the affairs of the Institute. In order to meet the recurring expenses of the Institute, a cess was levied by the government on the Textile industry of Pakistan. Later, in 1965, the Institute was granted affiliation by the University of Engineering and Technology, Lahore, and it was renamed "National College of Textile Engineering". The first batch of graduate engineers was passed out in 1966. In 1973 administrative control of the Institute was transferred to the Federal Government.

In 1992 the college received comprehensive assistance worth 650 million yen from the Japanese Government, through JICA program, in the form of latest machinery and equipment for all the departments of the Institution. The college was upgraded as National Textile University on 15 November 2002 through promulgation of Ordinance No. CXXIV of 2002 by the President of Islamic Republic of Pakistan.

Ever since its inception, National Textile University has been the premier Institute of textile education in the country, meeting the technical and managerial human resource needs of almost entire textile industry of Pakistan. It always retained a close relationship with the industry and the industrialists of Pakistan.

== Karachi campus ==
The university also maintains a recent affiliated campus in Korangi Industrial Area of Karachi.

== Faculties ==
=== School of Engineering and Technology ===
- Department of Textile Engineering
- Department of Textile Engineering Technology
- Department of Polymer Engineering
- Department of Apparel Manufacturing.

=== School of Art and Design ===
- Bachelor of Textile Design
- Bachelor of Fashion Design
- Bachelor of Visual Arts
- Bachelor of Multimedia & Animation Design
- Bachelor of Interior Design

=== School of Sciences ===
- Department of Computer Science
- Department of Applied Science

=== Faisalabad Business School ===
- BBA (Bachelor of Business Administration)
- BSTMM
- BSTAM
- BSQ&C
- BSA&F
- MBA (1.5 Years)
- MBA (2 Years)
- MSBA (Master of Science in Business Administration)
- PhD Management Sciences

== Degree programs ==
The disciplines and the degree programs offered by the university are given below. The regular duration of BS and MS/M Phil degree programs is four and two years, respectively.

Discipline	Degree program	
Discipline	BS	MS/M Phil
Textile Engineering	✓	✓
Polymer Engineering	✓	✓
Software Engineering	✓	
Computer Science	✓	✓
Apparel Merchandizing	✓	✓
Textile Engineering Technology	✓	
Textile Design and Technology	✓	
Fashion Design and Technology	✓	
Multimedia & Animation Design	✓	
Visual arts	✓	
Bachelor of Interior Design	✓	
Business Administration (BBA)	✓	✓
Textile Management and Marketing	✓	
Advanced Materials Engineering		✓
Mathematics		✓

== Departmental societies ==
- Society of Textile Spinners
- Society of Textile Chemist
- Garment Society
- Knitting Society
- Society of Textile Weavers
- Computer Science Society
- Textile Design Society
- Fashion Design Society
- Textile Management Society
- Executive Society
- Society of Polymer Engineering
- Society of Textile Technology

=== Other societies ===
- Computer Science Society
- Blood Donation Society
- NTU Community Services
- Technical Textile Society
- Arts and Culture Society
- Debating Club
- The Quran Society
- Literary Society
- NTU News Latter
- ASAA
- Character Building Societies
- Quran Society
- NTU Iqbal Society (IQS)

== Notable alumni ==
- Yasir Nawab – Vice-Chancellor of the University of Kamalia.

== See also ==
- List of universities in Pakistan
- List of engineering universities in Pakistan
- Textile Institute of Pakistan, Karachi
