= List of universities in Islamabad =

Higher education in Islamabad is a key driver of academic and research excellence in Pakistan. The city is home to over 25 universities, catering to a diverse student body. Approximately 100,000 students are enrolled in various higher education institutions in the capital, including top-ranked universities like NUST, QAU, and COMSATS. Islamabad's universities offer programs in fields such as engineering, business, humanities, and technology, contributing significantly to the country's skilled workforce. The city's academic institutions also focus on research and innovation, with over 15,000 faculty members supporting these initiatives.

== List of universities ==
University	Established	Campuses	Specialization	Type
Riphah International University	2002	Rawalpindi, Faisalabad, Lahore, Malakand	General	Private
Capital University of Science & Technology	1998		General	Private
Quaid-i-Azam University	1967		General	Public
Pakistan Institute of Engineering and Applied Sciences	1967			Public
National Defence University, Pakistan	1970		General	Public
Allama Iqbal Open University	1974		General	Public
International Islamic University, Islamabad	1980		General	Public
National University of Sciences and Technology, Pakistan	1991	Quetta	General	Public
COMSATS University	1998			Public
National University of Computer and Emerging Sciences	2000	Chiniot, Karachi, Lahore, Peshawar	General	Private
Bahria University	2000	Karachi, Lahore	General	Public
Sir Syed CASE Institute of Technology	2001	Islamabad	General	Private
Federal Urdu University of Arts, Science and Technology	1949	Karachi	General	Public
Institute of Space Technology	2002		General	Public
Foundation University, Islamabad	2002	Rawalpindi, Sialkot	General	Private
National University of Modern Languages	1969	Rawalpindi, Faisalabad, Lahore, Multan, Karachi, Hyderabad, Peshawar, Quetta, Gwadar, Mirpur	General	Public
Air University, Islamabad	2002	Multan, Kharian, Kamra	General	Public
Virtual University of Pakistan	2002	Across the entire Pakistan	General	Public
Shifa Tameer-e-Millat University	2012		General	Private
Shaheed Zulfiqar Ali Bhutto Medical University	2013		Medical	Public
Muslim Youth University	2013		General	Private
National University of Technology	2018		Engineering & Technology	Public
Pakistan Institute of Development Economics	1957		General	Public
National Skills University	2018		Engineering & Technology	Public
IBADAT International University Islamabad	1998		General	Private

== See also ==
- List of universities in Pakistan
  - List of universities of Punjab, Pakistan
  - List of universities in Sindh
  - List of universities in Khyber Pakhtunkhwa
  - List of universities in Balochistan
  - List of universities in Azad Kashmir
  - List of universities in Gilgit-Baltistan
- List of medical schools in Pakistan
  - List of medical schools in Islamabad
  - List of medical schools in Punjab, Pakistan
  - List of medical schools in Sindh
  - List of medical schools in Balochistan
  - List of medical schools in Khyber Pakhtunkhwa
  - List of medical schools in Azad Kashmir
  - List of medical schools in Gilgit-Baltistan
