= Institute of Industrial Electronics Engineering =

Public college in Pakistan

- Type: Public
- Established: 1989
- Affiliations: Pakistan Engineering Council, NED University of Engineering & Technology, Pakistan Council of Scientific and Industrial Research, Ministry of Science and Technology (Pakistan)
- Location: Karachi, Sindh, Pakistan
- Nickname: IIEE
- Website: iiee.edu.pk

The Institute of Industrial Electronics Engineering (IIEE) is a public college located in Karachi, Sindh, Pakistan. It is the first and only institution in Pakistan and the second in South Asia to offer a bachelor's degree in industrial electronics engineering.

== See also ==
- List of engineering universities and colleges in Pakistan
