= University of Southern Punjab =

Private university in Punjab, Pakistan

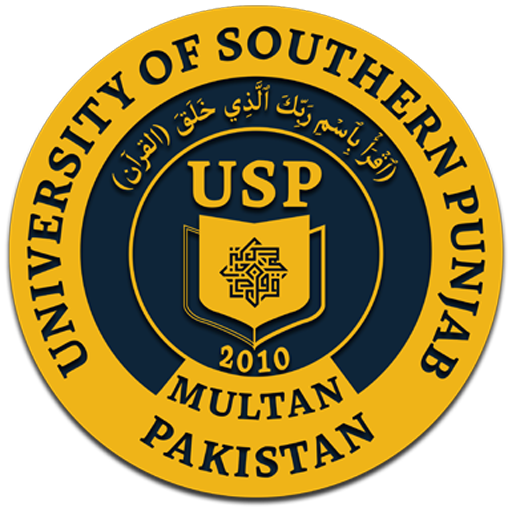
- Motto: Infinite Possibilities
- Type: Private
- Established: 2010
- Affiliations: Higher Education Commission (Pakistan), Pakistan Engineering Council, National Technology Council (Pakistan), Pakistan Council for Architects and Town Planners
- Chairman: Mr. Asim Nazir Ahmad
- Chancellor: Governor of the Punjab
- Rector: Prof. Dr. Muhammad Mukhtar
- Academic staff: 380+
- Students: 9083
- Location: 9-KM Bosan Road, Khayaban-e-Yousaf, Multan, Multan, Punjab, Pakistan; 30.289159°N 71.500055°E
- Campus: Urban
- Colours: Blue and Gold
- Nickname: USP
- Mascot: USPian
- Website: usp.edu.pk
- Location in Punjab, Pakistan University of Southern Punjab (Pakistan)
- Location of USP Multan campus

The University of Southern Punjab (formerly: Institute of Southern Punjab) is a private university in Multan, Punjab, Pakistan.

The university offers undergraduate, graduate, and postgraduate programs in various disciplines.

== History ==
The Institute of Southern Punjab received its charter from the Government of Punjab and is recognized by the Higher Education Commission of Pakistan. It was established in 2010. It was renamed the University of Southern Punjab following the passage of a bill on 25 October 2024 during the seventeenth session of the Provincial Assembly of Punjab.

== Campus ==
The campus is situated in Multan. It includes the 10-acre DHA Multan campus, a facility operated jointly with the Defence Housing Authority.

== Academic programs ==
The university offers a variety of programs in fields such as Engineering, Business Administration, Computer Science, Social Sciences, and Humanities.

=== Undergraduate programs ===
- Bachelor of Business Administration (BBA)
- Bachelor of Science in Computer Science (BSCS)
- Bachelor of Engineering (BE) in various disciplines

=== Graduate programs ===
- Master of Business Administration (MBA)
- Master of Science in Computer Science (MSCS)
- Master of Engineering (ME) in various disciplines

=== Postgraduate programs ===
- Doctor of Philosophy (PhD) in various disciplines
- Master of Philosophy (MPhil) in various disciplines
