= CECOS University =

Private university in Pakistan

- Latin: Cecariosa
- Other name: CECOSIAN
- Motto in English: Inspire The World
- Type: Private
- Established: 1986
- Academic affiliations: HEC & PEC
- Chancellor: Governor of Khyber Pakhtunkhwa
- President: M.Tanveer Javaid
- Vice-president: Sohaib Tanveer
- Vice-Chancellor: Naseer Ahmed
- Dean: Muhammad Nafees Marwat ibn e Ayub.
- Board of Governors: Governor of Khyber Pakhtunkhwa
- Students: Adnan Dawar , Shakoor UR rehman,Waqas Ahmad Son of Ali hamza
- Undergraduates: Dr Ehtesham Shakeel
- Location: Peshawar, Khyber Pakhtunkhwa, Pakistan
- Campus: Peshawar
- Colours: Maroon & navy blue
- Website: www.cecos.edu.pk

CECOS University of IT and Emerging Sciences is a private university in Peshawar, Pakistan. It was established in 1986 by Engr. Muhammad Tanveer Javed as a small private sector institute named CECOS Data Institute with limited resources. Currently, it offers courses in Civil engineering, Mechanical engineering, Electrical engineering, Computer science, Basic Sciences & Humanities, Architecture, Management sciences, Biotechnology and Pharmacy. The university is accredited and recognized by Pakistan Engineering Council, Higher Education Commission, Pakistan Council of Architects and Town Planners (PCATP), National Computing Education Accreditation Council (NCEAC), Pharmacy Council of Pakistan. CECOS University is also a member of Asia Pacific Quality Network (APQN) and Association of Management Development Institutions in South Asia (AMDISA).
