= Frontier Works Organization =

Frontier Works Organization (FWO)
- Active: 31 October 1966 – present
- Country: Pakistan
- Branch: Pakistan Army
- Headquarters/Garrison: FWO HeadQuarter Rawalpindi,
- Nickname: (FWO)
- Anniversaries: 31 October
- Equipment: Engineering vehicles
- Engagements: Indo-Pakistani War of 1971; Operation Parakram; War in North-West PakistanOperation Restoration; Operation Rah-e-Nijat
- Website: www.fwo.com.pk

Commanders
- Current commander: Major-General Abdul Sami; Director General

Aircraft flown
- Transport: Bell 206 Jet Ranger

The Frontier Works Organization (abbreviated as FWO), is a military engineering organization, and one of the major science and technology commands of the Pakistan Army. Commissioned and established in 1966, the FWO includes active duty officers and civilian scientists and engineers. Since its establishment in 1966, it has been credited with the construction of bridges, roads, tunnels, airfields and dams in Pakistan, on the orders of the civilian government of Pakistan.

Its objectives include projects related to civil, construction, combat, structural, and military engineering and is commanded by Maj Gen Kamal Azfar. The FWO led the design and construction of the Karakoram Highway. It builds civil and military infrastructure for the Government of Pakistan and the Pakistan Armed Forces.

== Main businesses of FWO ==
- Highways and roads
- Power stations and transmission lines
- Tunnel works
- Water resources
- Dams & Irrigation land development
- Infrastructure, Airports & Ports
- Bridges and flyovers
- Railway infrastructure

== Karakoram Highway Project ==
In the late 1960s, the Government of Pakistan and Government of China wished to construct a road link between Pakistan and the China. The task was assigned to the Pakistan Army. The army using its Corps of Engineers had already worked in 1959 in connecting Gilgit with Pakistan through the Indus Valley Road.

In the summer of 1966, a military organization was created by the Pakistan Army Corps of Engineers for the construction of the 805-kilometre long Karakoram Highway Road (commonly called KKH).

The funding was provided by the Ministry of Communications which exercised their control over the project on behalf of government of Pakistan. Thus was born the organization known as FWO which later on, in collaboration with the Chinese military engineers, undertook the gigantic task. ML1 inclusion is also there.

== Projects with Pakistan Atomic Energy Commission ==
The FWO began working with the Pakistan Atomic Energy Commission (PAEC) in December 1985. The FWO completed the engineering design in 1986 and constructed the Uranium mining facility at Baghalchur in February 1987. The construction of Khushab Nuclear Complex began somewhere in 1986, then FWO joined PAEC in 1987. The FWO started to established an Army Bridge Camp/Base Depot near at the Khushab, and has completed the project under one month.

In 1986, the FWO constructed the nuclear dump waste management plant at the Baghalchur Facility under the code name, Baghalchur Project. The Baghalchur Project was completed in January 1989. The same year and month, the FWO was assigned to conduct the site preparation for the Khushab Reactor, and work was completed in May 1989. In November, 1988, The FWO built the Additional Link Road under the codename "Phase- lV Base Depot Khushab". The project was completed in May 1991.

In October 1990, the FWO was assigned the task of constructing a uranium mining and milling facilityin Thola Dagar, Punjab. The FWO completed the survey and feasibility studies in three months and the construction of the mining facility was completed in October 1991.

The FWO alongside another military organization, the Special Development Works (SDW), (both of which fall under the Pakistan Army Corps of Engineers (PACE)) were involved in the construction of tunnels at Chagai, Balochistan in the late 1980s in preparation for the Chagai-I nuclear test which was eventually carried out on 25 May 1998. The military scientists and engineers of the Corps of Engineers, FWO, and SDW were also present during the nuclear test at Kharan Desert, codename Chagai-II.

== See also ==
- Karakoram Highway
- Kartarpur Corridor
- National University of Technology
