= Sir Syed CASE Institute of Technology =

Private university in Islamabad, Pakistan

- Other name: CASE
- Former name: Center for Advanced Studies in Engineering
- Motto: To bridge the gap between industry and academia
- Type: Private
- Established: September 11, 2001
- Affiliations: Higher Education Commission (Pakistan), Pakistan Engineering Council, Washington Accord
- Vice-Chancellor: Dr. Mohammad Ayub Alvi
- Location: Islamabad, Pakistan
- Website: case.edu.pk

The Sir Syed CASE Institute of Technology(SS-CASE-IT) is a private university located in Islamabad, Pakistan. It offers undergraduate, postgraduate, and doctoral degrees. Degrees awarded by SS-CASE-IT are recognized by the Higher Education Commission (HEC) of Pakistan. SS-CASE-IT, right from its inception, has been working to promote human resource development in the area of behind the scene technology, which is making today’s information revolution possible.

The Sir Syed Center for Advanced Studies in Engineering (SS-CASE-IT) was granted federal charter status as a degree-awarding institute in 2018. It was originally established in 2001 as the Center for Advanced Studies in Engineering (CASE), operating as an affiliated institute of the University of Engineering and Technology, Taxila.

== History ==
In May 2001, a group of engineers returned after completing Ph.D. in the United States. They set up EET (Engineering Education Trust) as a not-for-profit public charitable organization for education purposes. They aimed to provide substantial contributions to the research and publications areas in Pakistan through the introduction of graduate degree programs.

In January 2001, plans were initiated to establish CASE to provide higher education in engineering and management. The initiative developed from Communications Enabling Technologies (CET) Pakistan, a research and development organisation founded in Rawalpindi in 1998. The institute was started on September 11, 2001, at the Software Technology Park, Islamabad, in affiliation with the University of Engineering and Technology, Taxila. The affiliation permitted it to start M.Sc. and Ph.D. degree programs in computer engineering. It was inaugurated by the then Minister of Science and Technology professor Dr. Atta-ur-Rahman. Dr. Kamal Athar was the director from 2001 until 2003. It started with a faculty of nine Ph.Ds and three Master of Science.

The institute started a B.Sc. program in 2003 in its school SS-CARE (Sir Syed Center for Advanced Research in Engineering) initially in collaboration with Sir Syed Memorial Society, named after Indian reformer Syed Ahmad Khan. The classes started at Sir Syed Esquire situated at 19th Atatürk Avenue, Islamabad. Later on, undergraduate classes commenced under the name of CASE (Center for Advanced Studies in Engineering). In 2018, it has obtained a degree awarding status by the Government of Pakistan. It is the first institute which started engineering management degree program in Pakistan.

== Academic Profile ==
SS-CASE-IT offers undergraduate programs and post-graduate programs including a doctoral program.

Undergraduate programs

SS-CASE-IT offers undergraduate programs in areas of Engineering, Management Sciences, Computing‚ Sciences and Humanities, and Allied Medical and Health Sciences.

Faculty of Engineering

Dean: Dr. Abdul Khaliq

Degrees Offered

- Bachelor of Science in Artificial Intelligence
- Bachelor of Science in Computer Science
- Bachelor of Science in Software Engineering
- Bachelor of Science in Cyber Security
- Bachelor of Science in Electrical Engineering
- Associate Degree In Computer Science

Faculty of Allied Medical and Health Sciences

Degrees Offered

- Doctor of Physical Therapy
- BS Medical Laboratory Technology
- BS Medical Imaging(Radiology) Technology
- BS Vision Sciences and Optometry
- BS Operation Theater Technology

Faculty of Business and Engineering Management

Dean: Dr. Nadeem Ehsan

Degrees Offered

- Bachelor of Business Administration
- Bachelor of Science in Accounting and Finance
- Associate Degree In commerce(Bcom)

Faculty of Sciences and Humanities Degrees Offered

- Bachelor of Science in English
- Bachelor of Science in Mathematics

Graduate programs

SS-CASE-IT offers postgraduate programs in Engineering, Business and Management Sciences, and Sciences and Humanities.

Faculty of Engineering

Dean: Dr. Abdul Khaliq

Degrees Offered

- Master of Science in Computer Science
- Master of Science in Electrical Engineering

Faculty of Business and Engineering Management

Dean: Dr. Nadeem Ehsan

Degrees Offered

- Master of Science in Engineering Management
- Master of Science in Project Management
- Master of Business Administration

Faculty of Sciences and Humanities

Degrees Offered

- Masters of Science in Mathematics

Doctoral Programs

- Doctor of Philosophy in Engineering Management
- Doctor of Philosophy in Electrical Engineering

== Industry Academia Linkage ==
CARE Pvt. Ltd

CARE Pvt. Ltd is the industrial arm of Sir Syed CASE Institute of Technology (SS-CASE-IT), and a Memorandum of Understanding (MoU) has been established between the two entities. Students pursuing an undergraduate, post-graduate, and doctoral degree at SS-CASE-IT frequently engage with professionals from CARE Pvt. Ltd during their Final year or research projects. These projects are overseen by Ph.D. holders employed at CARE Pvt. Ltd.

Techlift

TechLift is a historic, strategic collaboration between 22 industry leaders to address the IT skills supply-demand gap. SS CASE IT with CARE Pvt. Ltd organized the following three (03) Boot camps of the Techlift Program in 2023: -

1. Web Development – MERN
2. Mobile App Development – Flutter
3. Software Quality Assurance – Selenium

== See also ==
- List of universities in Pakistan
- List of engineering universities and colleges in Pakistan
