= National University of Modern Languages =

University in Islamabad, Pakistan

- جامعہ نمل
- Other name: NUML
- Former name: Institute Of Modern Languages
- Type: Public
- Established: 1969
- Accreditation: Higher Education Commission; Pakistan Academy of Letters; Pakistan Engineering Council; National Computing Education Accreditation Council; Association of Commonwealth Universities
- Chancellor: President of Pakistan
- Rector: Maj Gen Shahid Mahmood Kayani HI(M), Retd
- Director General: Brig Muhammad Rafiq Khan, nwsc, psc, adsc
- Administrative staff: ~1,787
- Students: ~32,350
- Location: Islamabad, Pakistan; 33°40′N 73°03′E
- Campus: Urban
- Colours: Blue, white, yellow
- Website: numl.edu.pk

The National University of Modern Languages (NUMLs) (Urdu: نیشنل یونیورسٹی آف ماڈرن لینگوئجز) is a multi-campus public university with its main campus located in Islamabad, Pakistan and other campuses in different cities of Pakistan.

The university offers undergraduate, graduate and postgraduate programs in languages, linguistics, social sciences, media & communications, management sciences, electrical & software engineering and computer sciences.

== History ==
The National University of Modern Languages was established as an institute of modern languages in 1969. Initially, the institute provided language training facilities to the Armed Forced personnel and other government servants. In May 2000, its status was upgraded from an institution to a federal charter University.

== Faculties and departments ==
=== Faculty of the Engineering and Computer Sciences ===
- Department of Software Engineering
- Department of Computer Science
- Department of Electrical Engineering
- Department of Mathematics
- Department of Artificial Intelligence
- Department of Information Technology

=== Faculty of Arts and Humanities ===
- Department of English for Under-Graduate Studies
- Department of English for Graduate Studies

=== Faculty of Management Studies ===
- Department of Economics
- Department of Management Science
- Department of Commerce and Accounting

=== Faculty of Social Sciences ===
- Department of Educational Sciences
- Department of International Relations & Peace and Conflict Studies
- Department of Governance and Public Policy
- Department of Media Studies
- Department of Pakistan Studies
- Department of Islamic Thought and Culture
- Department of Applied Psychology
- Department of Area Studies China

=== Faculty of Languages ===
- Department of Arabic Language and Culture
- Department of Chinese Language and Culture
- Department of English Language Teaching
- Department of French Language and Culture
- Department of German Language and Culture
- Department of Italian Language and Culture
- Department of Japanese Language and Culture
- Department of Korean Language and Culture
- Department of Pakistani Languages
- Department of Persian Language and Culture
- Department of Russian Language and Culture
- Department of South Asian Languages and Cultures
- Department of Spanish Language and Culture
- Department of Turkish Studies
- Department of Urdu Language and Literature
- Department of Translation and interpretation

==== International institutes, centers and chairs operating at NUML ====
- Confucius Institute, China
- Iranology Center, Iran
- King Sejong Institute, Republic of Korea
- Yunus Emre Institute, Turkiye
- Belarusian Language and Culture Chair, Belarus
- Jean Monnet Chair – Europe

== Research journals ==
| Sr. | Name | ISSN# | Image |
|---|---|---|---|
| a) | Al Basirah | 2520-7334 | |
| b) | DARYAFT | 2616-6038 | |
| c) | NUML Journal of Critical Inquiry (JCI) | 2789-4665 | |
| d) | Journal of Research in Social Sciences (JRSS) | 2306-112X(E) | |
| e) | NUML International Journal of Business & Management | 2521-473X (Online) | |
| f) | NUML International Journal of Engineering and Computing | 2788-9629 | |
| g) | Polyglot: A Journal of Language, Culture & Translation Studies | 2790-2307 | |

== Distinguished people ==
- General Pervez Musharraf NI(M) TBt
- General Khalid Shameem Wynne NI(M), HI(M) (Late)
- General Raheel Sharif NI(M) HI(M)
- Admiral Muhammad Zakaullah NI(M) HI(M) SI(M) TI(M) (Retd)
- Admiral Asif Sandila NI(M) HI(M) (Retd)
- Air Chief Marshal Tahir Rafique Butt, TBt, NI(M), HI(M) (Retd)
- Sahabzada Yaqub Khan (Late) [Minister of Foreign Affairs]
- Zobaida Jalal [Federal Minister]
- Salman Bashir (Retd) [Foreign Secretary of Pakistan]
- Masood Khan [President of Azad Kashmir]
- Tehmina Janjua [Foreign Secretary of Pakistan]
- Kashif Abbasi [Journalist/Anchor Person, Ary News]

== Rectors ==
| Sr. | Name | From | To | Portrait |
|---|---|---|---|---|
| 1) | Brig Aziz Ahmed Khan (Retd) | 29-05-2000 | 23-06-2011 | |
| 2) | Maj Gen Masood Hasan HI(M), Retd | 24-06-2011 | 30-06-2015 | |
| 3) | Maj Gen Zia Ud Din Najam HI(M), Retd | 10-07-2015 | 10-07-2019 | |
| 4) | Maj Gen Muhammad Jaffar HI(M), Retd | 10-07-2019 | 09-01-2024 | |
| 5) | Maj Gen Shahid Mahmood Kayani HI(M), Retd | 10-01-2024 | To date | |

== Alumni ==
| Name | Job Title | Department | Institution |
|---|---|---|---|
| Fatima Kubra | Translator and Interpreter Officer | T&I Department | National University of modern Languages Main Campus (Islamabad) |
| Qasim Chattha | Controller | Military Accounts | Military Accounts |
| Salman Yasin | Country Manager | Business Intelligence | Business Intelligence |
| Shahneed Ahmed | Manager | Corporate Business | Jubilee Life Insurance |
| Madiha Hamad | HR Manager | HR | AAI German |
| Muhammad Tayyab | Marketing Executive | Marketing | DESTO |
| Sohaib Afzal Khan | Finance Executive | Finance | Attock Petroleum Ltd |
| Raima Amjad | Resident Auditor | Local Fund Audit | Govt. of Pakistan |
| Syed Komail Shamim | Area Manager - North | Psychiatry & Neurology | Lundbeck Pakistan |
| Sameen Mansoor | CEO | CEO | Palki Creations |
| Jawwad Zuberi | CEO | CEO | Mohsin Sons |
| Raja Ammar Nadeem | President Student Body | English UGS | NUML, Islamabad |
| Shaun Shafqat | Senior Manager | Financial Services | S&P Global |
| Dr. Muahmamd Asif | Professor | Management Sciences | SZABIST Islamabad |
| Hassan Anwaar | Commercial Head Pakistan | Airline Industry | Air Arabia Group (Fly Jinnah, Air Arabia & Air Arabia Abu Dhabi) |

== Intellectual forums ==
Different intellectual and academic forums have been established to study and investigate contemporary geo-political challenges and socio-cultural dynamics. Some of these include:-

1. NUML Dialogue Forum
2. Centre for Regional Studies
3. Centre for Research on Languages and Cultures
4. Center for Multidisciplinary Research
5. NUML Writer's Forum
6. NUML Mehfil Forum

NUML Dialogue Forum engages the faculty and the students in critical interactions about the contemporary issues. It has a semi-structured pattern of discussion in which a talk is given by some renowned personality and subsequently a question-answer session follows.

Center for Regional Studies is dedicated to the study and investigation of regional issues which are political, cultural and sociological in nature. It is primarily a research-based center which seeks to explore the significant dynamics related to South Asian Region.

CRLC aims at tracing back the history of languages and cultures to their genesis. Investigating their linkages and role in culture-formation area/era-wise with special emphasis on major civilizations. Developing repository (scripts and audio) – corpus of languages. Publicizing research and providing policy-related input to relevant stakeholder.

Center for Multi-Disciplinary Research (CMR) Established in 2021, provides technical platform for cross-disciplinary research incorporating IT and commercialization. One project has been submitted (FE&CS – FMS) while seven (FE&CS – FoL, FAH, FMS, FSS) are in process. Two publications have been submitted (FE&CS – FMS, FAH) while eleven (FE&CS – FMS, FSS, FoL, FAH) are in process

NUML Writers’ Forum (NWF) established to incentivize and encourage faculty, students and alumni to accomplish research and write books on important socio-economic and political issues. Authors are being facilitated in terms of availability of time, provision of relevant research material, compilation, formatting, editing and publication.

Finally, NUML Mehfil Forum is a cultural and literary forum which organizes various talks and events related to literary and cultural topics. It has a more informal pattern and some intellectual personality is invited for a non-structured talks, poetry recitations, autobiographical narratives and question-answer sessions.

NUML also hosted an Anti-Drug Awareness Campaign with ANF and HEC, on combating drug abuse. event included alarming statistics on drug seizures and arrests, with plans to incorporate anti-drug initiatives into NUML's curriculum.

== Promotion of sports culture ==
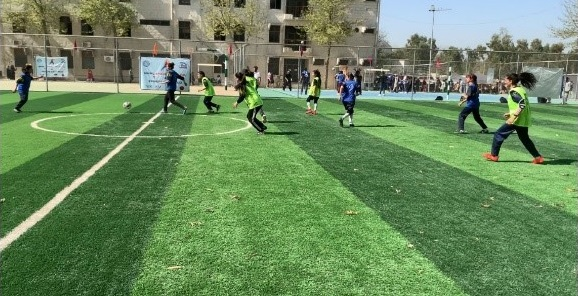
NUML's Futsal Field

- NUML won two Bronze Medals in HEC All Pakistan Intervarsity Intervarsity Boxing championship 2023-24
- Sajjad Akbar won HEC Zone E Badminton Championship 2023-24
- NUML won the HEC Intervarsity Football Championship Zone E 2023-24
- NUML Debating Society (NDS) have won the Team Trophy award in CUST Allama Iqbal Twin City Bilingual Declamation Contest.
- NUML won the HEC Intervarsity Zone-E Volleyball men championship 2023-24
- NUML won Table Tennis Championship (Men) for Year 2023-2024
- Almaa Shfan, Won Silver Medal in All Pakistan Inter-Varsity 15th Korean Ambassador National Taekwondo Championship 2022
- NUML Won Inter-University Hockey Championship Zone C
- NUML Won Inter-University Volley-ball Championship Zone C
- Kamyab Jawan Sports Drive Inter-Varsity - 90 Plus Students Participated in Men (Hockey, Boxing, Judo, Athletics) and Women (Football, Volleyball, Athletics) Sports Events
- NUML Female student participated in COAS Pakistan Open International Taekwondo Championship – 2021
- Janita Javed, Won Silver Medal in Table Tennis (All KPK Games 2022)
- NUML Won Bronze Medal in All Pakistan Inter-Varsity Boxing Championship
- 3 Gold and 4 Silver Medals, Kamyab Jawan Talent Hunt Wrestling - Province Level

== Student facilities ==
=== Auditorium ===
NUML has an auditorium for different events like Convocations, Conferences, Open house job fair etc.

=== Hostels ===
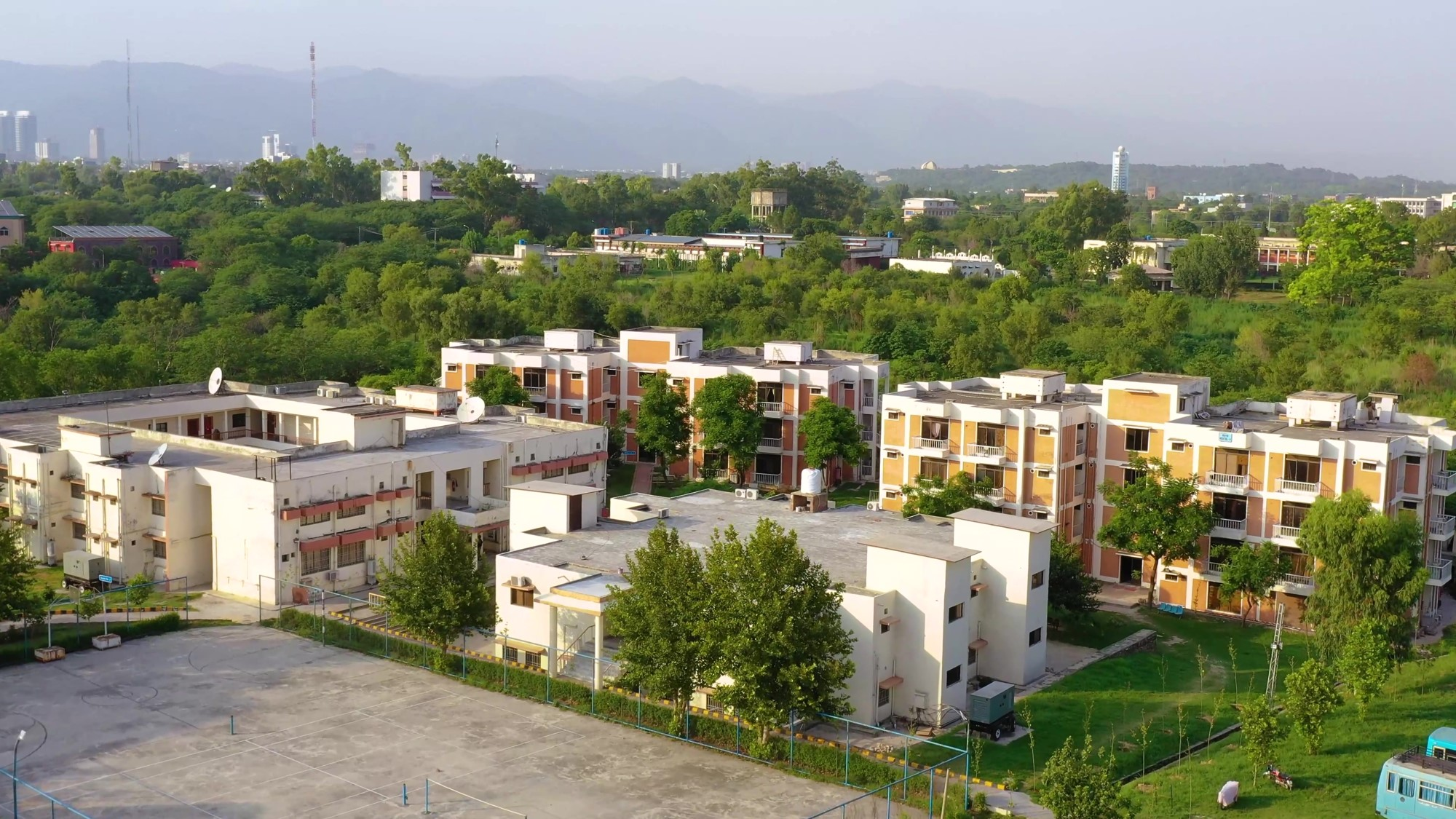
Hostels of NUML

Each Hostel (separate for boys and girls, and also for faculty) in the university is self-contained with amenities such as a reading room, an indoor games room, a lounge and a dining hall with mess.

=== NUML video conferencing ===
Video conference facility at NUML is frequently used for conduct of conferences and relaying seminars/workshops/talks or any important academic or non-academic events held in the Islamabad Campus. A video conference setup is also established at the university auditorium through which important events are shared with all regional campuses. Moreover, interviews, interaction with the regional directors and PhD/MPhil scholars’ final defence of thesis are also conducted through this.

=== Mosque ===
The mosque is located in the heart of the campus near where the university community offers their daily prayers as well as Jumma prayer. The mosque is open to the public for prayer. Daily sermons are delivered in both Arabic and Urdu. The spacious mosque offers separate prayer facilities for men and women.

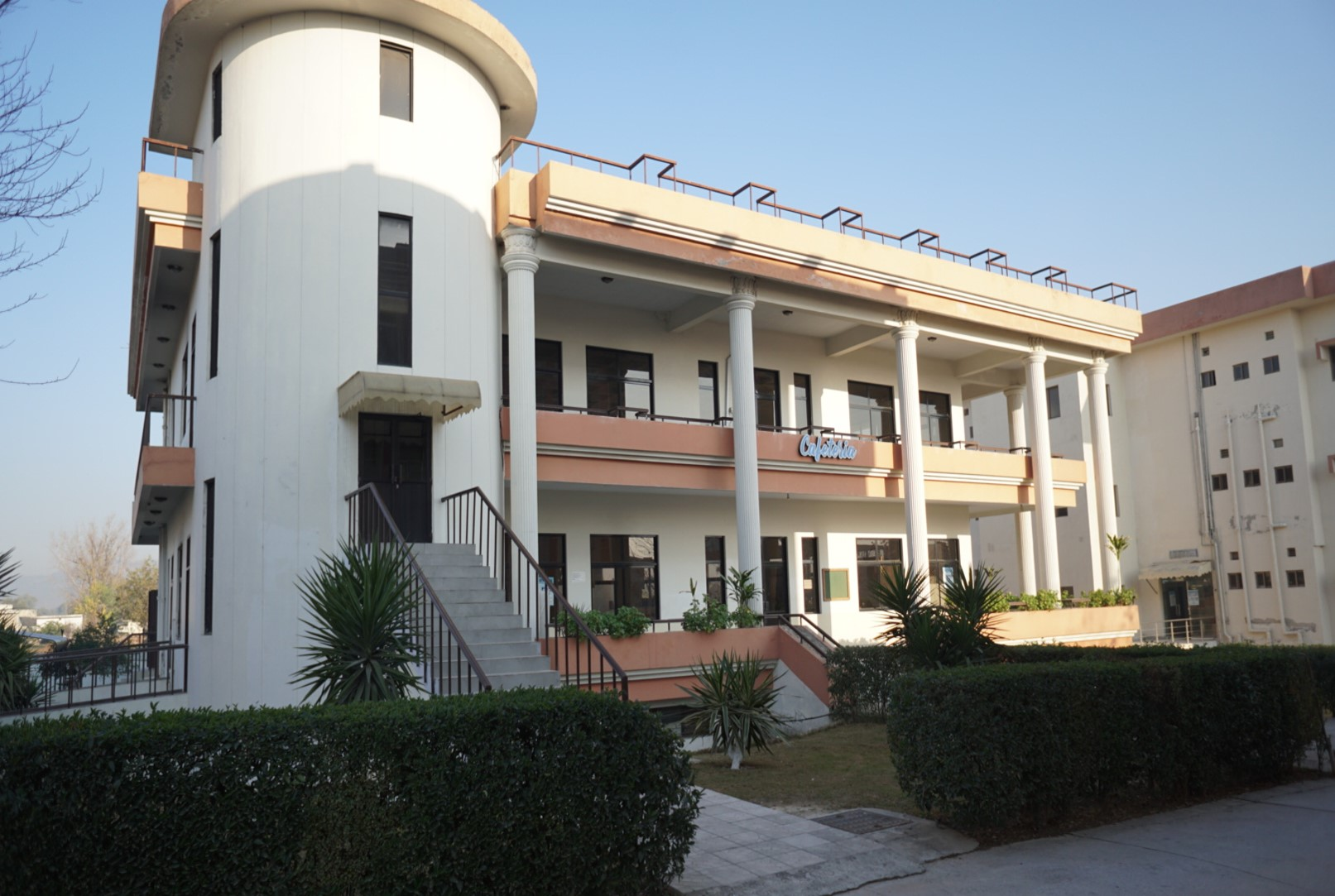
Cafeteria NUML

=== NUML Placement Centre ===
NUML Placement Centre, established in July 2021, organizes a number of corporate grooming sessions, job fairs and on-campus recruitment drives.

=== Cafeterias ===
Currently, NUML has two cafeterias. The second, a three-storey cafeteria named Anaaj Café featuring an outdoor food street, was officially opened in November 2023.

=== Sports facilities ===
NUML features a gymnasium built around 2008, equipped with facilities for basketball, handball, volleyball, badminton, table tennis, weight training, and cardiovascular fitness machines. The main sports ground, used for football, hockey, and cricket, has also been upgraded. Additionally, an international-standard futsal ground, an outdoor volleyball court, and a basketball court were constructed.

The NUML Padel Courts Complex (operated as VivaPro NUML Padel Club near Iqbal Block) was officially inaugurated on 17 February 2026.

=== Library ===
NUML has a dedicated block with two floors for library. The present library is holding over one hundred and fifty thousand (150,000) books, journals, documents and non-book material on various disciplines. This facility is available 7 days a week.

=== E-Library ===
NUML has established E-Library for its students/scholars and faculty with online access to a wide range of books along with MPhil/PhD thesis.

=== Research room and facilitation center ===
In the library, a dedicated research room and facilitation center with 18 & 28 computers respectively have been established for undergraduate and MPhil/PhD scholars and faculty members. NUML has a valid subscription to HEC digital library, which is extended to faculty, students and researchers. Additional digital library resources are arranged from the HEC which include IEEE and ACM etc. Access of Digital Library resources (on-campus and off-campus) for the students and researches are arranged.

=== Day-care facility ===
To facilitate academic and administrative staff members, NUML provides Daycare facility for their kids so that they can perform their duties without stress.

=== FM radio ===
NUML has FM Radio on fm band 104.6 accessible with in the campus. Its programme cue sheet is also available on website.

=== Solarization ===
On main campus Solarization - 600KW installed (40% of total consumption) and Additional 310KW is being installed (overall 54% of consumption)

=== Go Green Project ===
NUML took initiated to work on Under NUML's Go green project 2,000 Chinar and 8,000 Rose Plants were planted in last 2 years.

== Campuses and branches ==
=== Campuses ===
Campuses of the university are located in the following cities:

- Lahore Campus
- Faisalabad Campus
- Karachi Campus
- Multan Campus
- Quetta Campus
- Peshawar Campus
- Hyderabad Campus
- Mirpur Campus
- Rawalpindi Campus
- Gwadar Campus

=== Branch ===
The university also has a branch in Rawalpindi formerly known as APCOMS.

== See also ==
List of universities in Pakistan

- List of universities in Islamabad
- List of universities in Punjab, Pakistan
- List of universities in Sindh
- List of universities in Khyber Pakhtunkhwa
- List of universities in Balochistan
- List of universities in Azad Kashmir
- List of universities in Gilgit-Baltistan
