= University of Chakwal =

University in Chakwal, Pakistan

- یونیورسٹی آف چکوال
- Type: Public
- Established: 17 January 2020
- Location: Chakwal, Punjab, Pakistan; 32.93°N 72.85°E
- Campus: Urban, 40 acres (16 ha)
- Affiliations: Higher Education Commission
- Website: uoc.edu.pk

The University of Chakwal (UOC) is a public university located in Chakwal, Punjab Pakistan. It was established in January, 2020 through the University of Chakwal ACT 2019 (Punjab Act No. I of 2020). An exalted chapter was added in the history of Pakistan as well as the Chakwal district, when the incumbent Minister for Higher Education Department, Govt. of the Punjab, Raja Yassir Humayun, presented the bill of establishment of "University of Chakwal" in the Punjab Assembly which was approved unanimously by combining Government Post Graduate College (Chakwal) and Old Kachehri Balkasar Sub-campuses of University of Engineering and Technology, Taxila.

The University of Chakwal has six faculties; Faculty of Pharmacy, Faculty of Human Nutrition and Dietetics, Faculty of Engineering, Faculty of Basic Sciences, Faculty of Arts and Faculty of Computer Sciences & IT consisting of 21 departments. The existing batch 2015 of Electronics and Mechatronics Engineering studying under the University of Chakwal have been accredited by Pakistan Engineering Council under level II (Washington Accord). [Item #19].

The Faculty of Pharmacy will offer bachelor's of Pharmacy, The Faculty of Human Nutrition and Dietetics will offer bachelor's of Human Nutrition and Dietetics, The Faculty of Engineering of the University of Chakwal will offer Bachelor's of Engineering in Electronics, Mechatronics and Petroleum & Gas, while Faculties of Arts, Basic Sciences and Computer Sciences and Information Technology offer degree programs in various disciplines.

The university was originally planned to be called North Punjab University with an estimated budget of Rs. 1000 Million.

The name of University of Chakwal was previously allocated to a private institute that was established in 2015. The university was planned to offered 4-years bachelor's degree in basic sciences, social sciences, management sciences and computer sciences. It was a project by the Horizon College Chakwal. It was the Chakwal's first private university located at the main Bhaun Road in Chakwal having four faculties; Faculty of Natural Sciences, Faculty of Arts and Social Sciences, Faculty of Management Sciences and Faculty of Computer Sciences which consisted of 18 departments.

In May 2017, Higher Education Commission cancelled the No Objective Certificate (NOC) granted to Private University of Chakwal.

On 17 January 2020, University of Chakwal Act 2019 came into force establishing Public sector University of Chakwal.

University of chakwal consist of 20 Departments, 100+ Faculty, and 5000+ Students.

== Faculties ==
Sr. #	Faculty	Departments
1	Faculty of Pharmacy	Department of Pharmacy
2	Faculty of Human Nutrition and Dietetics	Department of Human Nutrition and Dietetics
3	Faculty of Engineering	Department of Electronics
3	Faculty of Engineering	Department of Mechatronics
3	Faculty of Engineering	Department of Petroleum & Gas
4	Faculty of Arts	Department of English
4	Faculty of Arts	Department of Economics
4	Faculty of Arts	Department of Islamic Studies
4	Faculty of Arts	Department of Urdu
4	Faculty of Arts	Department of History
4	Faculty of Arts	Department of Political Science
4	Faculty of Arts	Department of International Relations
5	Faculty of Basic Sciences	Department of Botany
5	Faculty of Basic Sciences	Department of Mathematics
5	Faculty of Basic Sciences	Department of Physics
5	Faculty of Basic Sciences	Department of Chemistry
5	Faculty of Basic Sciences	Department of Statistics
5	Faculty of Basic Sciences	Department of Zoology
5	Faculty of Basic Sciences	Department of Geology
5	Faculty of Basic Sciences	Department of Anthropology
6	Faculty of Computer Sciences	Department of Computer Sciences
6	Faculty of Computer Sciences	Department of Information Technology

== Faculty of Pharmacy ==
Currently, the faculty offers a 5-year degree program, Doctor of Pharmacy (PHARM-D).

=== Faculty Members ===
Name	Position
Dr. Asif Mahmood	Head of Department/Chairperson, Assistant Professor, HEC Approved Supervisor
Dr. Muhammad Imran	Assistant Professor
Dr. Waleed Shakeel	Lecturer
Dr. Urfa Nasir	Lecturer
