= Abasyn University =

Private university in Pakistan

Coordinates: 34.0353°N 71.5890°E

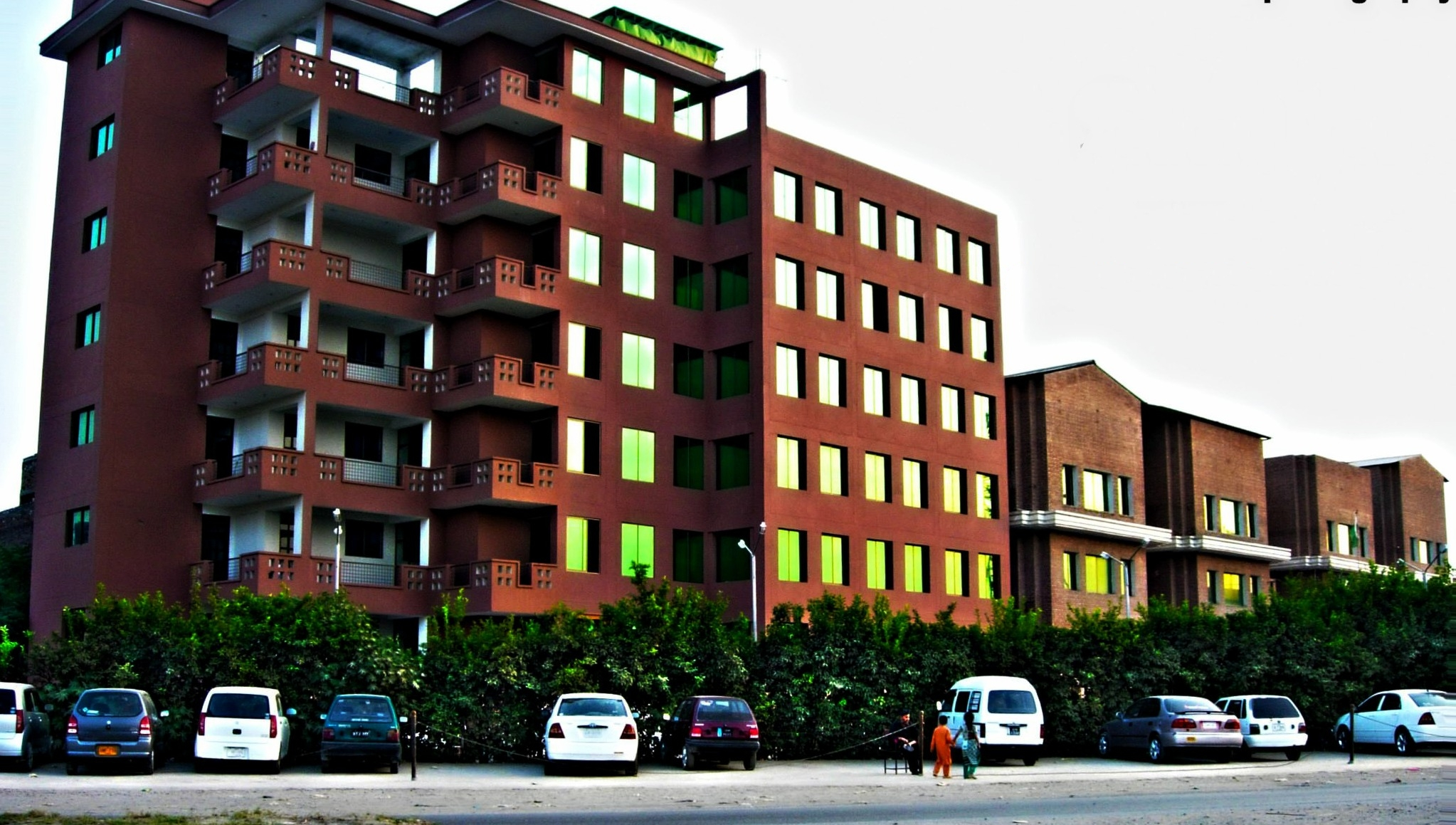
- Former name: Abasyn Institute of Management Sciences
- Motto in English: Passion to Design Future....
- Type: Private
- Established: 2007
- Academic affiliations: Higher Education Commission (Pakistan); Pakistan Engineering Council; Pharmacy Council of Pakistan
- Chancellor: Muhammad Imran Ullah
- Vice-Chancellor: S. Umar Farooq
- Location: Peshawar, Khyber-Pakhtunkhwa, Pakistan
- Colours: Green and white
- Website: abasyn.edu.pk

The Abasyn University is a private university located in Peshawar, Khyber-Pakhtunkhwa, Pakistan. It was founded in 2007.

== History ==
Abasyn University was founded by Imran Ullah, who established the Abasyn Institute in Peshawar after completing his MBA at Sul Ross State University in the United States in the late 1990s. The institute initially offered undergraduate and postgraduate degree programmes in affiliation with Gomal University.

In 2009, the Provincial Assembly of Khyber Pakhtunkhwa passed legislation granting a charter to Abasyn University, upgrading it to an independent degree-awarding institution. In 2012, the university received a No Objection Certificate (NOC) from the Higher Education Commission (HEC) to open an additional campus in Islamabad.

In 2017, the university established a primary and secondary school campus in Peshawar. The purpose-built school facility covers approximately 80,000 square feet and contains 60 classrooms.

== Academics and profile ==
The university operates two campuses, located in Peshawar and Islamabad, offering around 50 degree programmes across undergraduate, graduate, and doctoral levels. As of recent estimates, total student enrollment across both campuses exceeds 9,000, with an alumni network of over 16,000 graduates. The affiliated school in Peshawar has an enrollment of more than 850 students.

== Overview ==
Abasyn university is chartered by the Government of Khyber Pakhtunkhwa and recognized by the Higher Education Commission (Pakistan) (HEC). It is also accredited by the Pharmacy Council of Pakistan and Pakistan Engineering Council. It offers undergraduate and post-graduate studies in various disciplines including engineering, engineering technology, computer science, business administration, pharmacy, microbiology, and education. Abasyn university is noted for its engaging research in the development of augmented reality and artificial intelligence.

== Sub campuses ==
Besides its main campus in Peshawar, the university also has a teaching campus in Islamabad and in Ras Al Khaimah, UAE.

== Journal ==
Abasyn Journal of Social Sciences (AJSS) publishes rigorous, well written articles from a range of theoretical and methodological traditions. AJSS published articles that engage with contemporary challenges in the field of business and management.
