= National University of Computer and Emerging Sciences =

Private research university in Pakistan

- Logo of the National University
- Other names: NU; NUCES; FAST; FAST-NUCES
- Former name: FAST Institute of Computer Science
- Motto: الذی علم بالقلم۔ علم الانسان ما لم يعلم۔
- Motto in English: [He] who has taught by the pen--has taught man that which he knew not. (Quran 96:4-5)
- Type: Private (non-profit)
- Established: 2000; 26 years ago
- Parent institution: Foundation for Advancement of Science and Technology
- Accreditation: Higher Education Commission; Pakistan Engineering Council; Washington Accord
- Chancellor: Wasim Sajjad
- Rector: Aftab Ahmed
- Academic staff: 532
- Students: 11,000
- Location: Headquarters: G-9, Islamabad
- Campus: Chiniot—Faisalabad; Islamabad; Karachi; Lahore; Multan; Peshawar
- Language: English
- Colours: Bleu de France, amber
- Website: www.nu.edu.pk

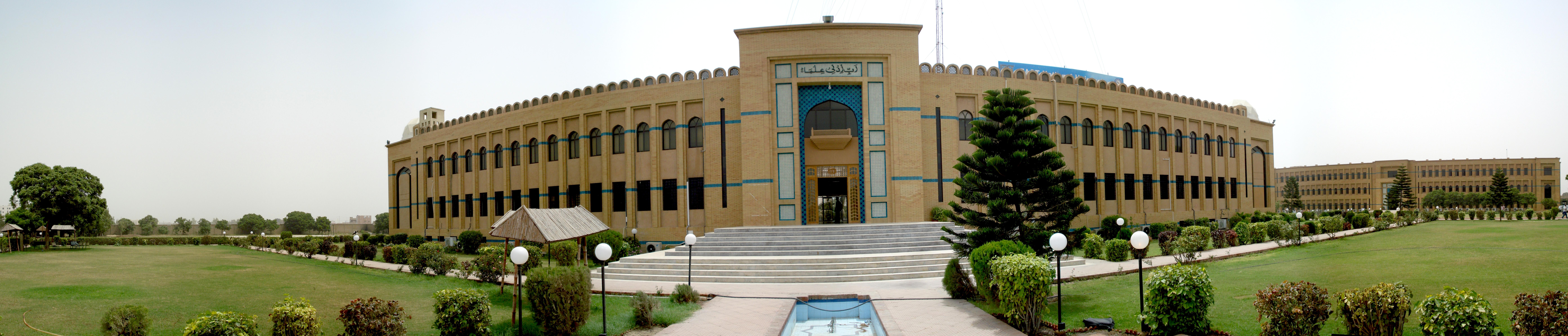
Karachi campus

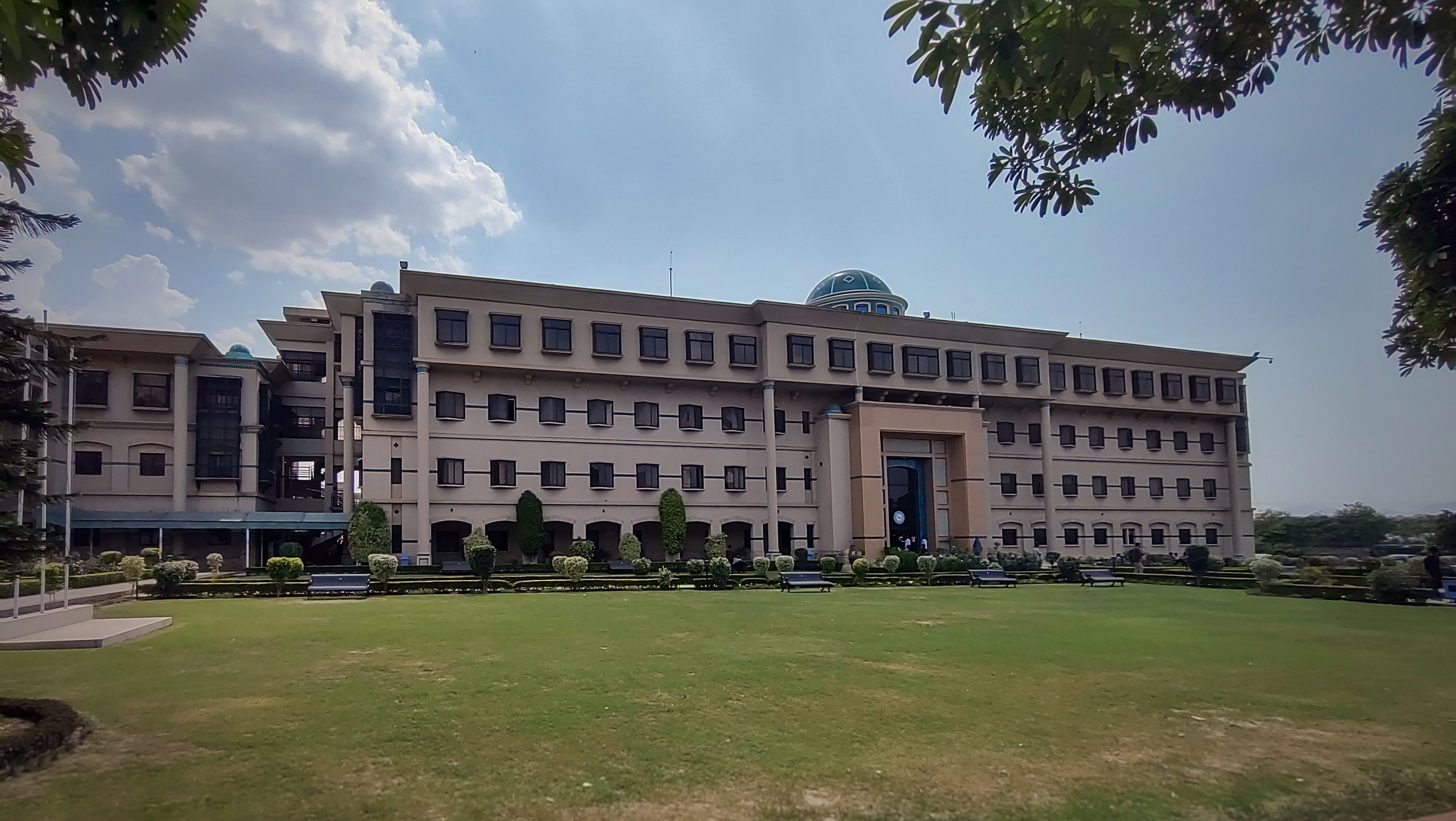
Islamabad Campus

The National University of Computer and Emerging Sciences (NUCES), also known by its parent institute Foundation for Advancement of Science and Technology (FAST), is a private research university in Pakistan with multiple campuses across the country, namely in major cities such as Islamabad, Lahore, Karachi, Peshawar, Multan, and Faisalabad.

== Overview ==
The university is the first multi-campus university in Pakistan, having six modern campuses based in different cities. These campuses are located in Chiniot-Faisalabad, Islamabad, Karachi, Lahore, Multan and Peshawar, providing a standard educational environment and recreational facilities to 11,000 students, out of which 500 are faculty members and a quarter is covered by female students. Founded as Federally Chartered University, it was inaugurated by Prime Minister and President Pervez Musharraf, Asif Ali Zardari, Imran Khan, Nawaz Sharif, Dr. Arif Alvi, Shehbaz Sharif in July 2000. It is consistently ranked among the leading institutions of higher education in the country and ranked top in computer sciences and information technology by the Higher Education Commission of Pakistan in 2020. Its engineering programs are accredited with the Pakistan Engineering Council. FAST is a not-for-profit educational institution charging subsidized fees from its students. Besides this, FAST offers different financial assistance programs for deserving students in the form of loans.

== History ==
The Foundation of Advancement of Science and Technology was founded and established by Justice (Retd) Syed Akhlaq Hussain and the Bank of Credit and Commerce International financier. Hasan Abidi, founder of BCCI, provided a large financial capital for the university to promote research in computer sciences and emerging technologies during the 1980s. Later this foundation established the National University of Computer and Emerging Sciences which was inaugurated by Former President and Chief of Army Staff General Pervez Musharraf, President Asif Ali Zardari, Chief Minister of Punjab Maryam Nawaz Sharif, Former President Dr. Arif Alvi, Former Prime Minister of Pakistan Imran Khan, Former Prime Minister of Pakistan Nawaz Sharif, and the Prime Minister of Pakistan Shehbaz Sharif. in 2000. It is privileged to be the first private sector university, having multiple campuses set up under the Federal Charter granted by Ordinance No.XXIII of 2000, dated 1 July 2000.

Established in 1980, the sponsoring body of FAST university was registered by the Government of Pakistan as a charitable institution. FAST was a pioneer in Pakistan's IT sector development by offering the country's first undergraduate computer science curriculum, with its headquarters in Islamabad. FAST is considered to be one of the top IT programs in Pakistan, alongside LUMS, GIKI and NUST. Many alumni of FAST have risen to senior positions in companies like Alphabet, Meta and Amazon.

== Campuses ==
National University of Computer and Emerging Sciences is a university in Pakistan, with a multi-campus setup and its central administration based in Islamabad. The university operates six campuses, in Islamabad, Karachi, Lahore, Peshawar, Chiniot-Faisalabad and Multan.

=== Islamabad Campus ===
The FAST National University Islamabad campus is situated at A.K Brohi Road, H-11/4 and serves as the university's main hub.

=== Karachi Campus ===
The FAST National University Karachi campus has two branches: the main campus, located in sector 17-D of Shah latif town at National Highway, and the city campus, located in Block-6 PECHS.

=== Lahore Campus ===
The FAST National University Lahore campus is situated in Faisal Town and spans 12.5 acres of land.

At the Lahore campus, students have access to only studies. Now, there are multiple societies that students can join.

=== Peshawar Campus ===
The Peshawar campus of the FAST National University is for students seeking an education in technical fields. It is located in the Hayatabad suburb of Peshawar.

Students can pursue degree programs in Computer Science, Electrical Engineering, and Business Administration.

=== Chiniot-Faisalabad Campus ===
The Chiniot campus of the FAST National University is the fifth campus of the university. It is located on 22 acres of land on the Faisalabad-Chiniot Road, approximately nine and a half kilometers from the Faisalabad Motorway interchange.

The Chiniot campus offers degree programs in Computer Science, Electrical Engineering, and Business Administration.

=== Multan Campus ===
FAST National University, Multan Campus is the newest addition to the university's network of campuses. It is located in the city of Multan, in the province of Punjab, Pakistan. The campus provides easy access to students from all over the region.

== Academic Profile ==
FAST university offers undergraduate, post-graduate and doctoral programs in business and sciences, at their campuses. The availability of bachelor programs depends on the campuses.

=== Undergraduate Studies ===
The undergraduate courses are offered by university in different disciplines for bachelor's in sciences and business, leading to a bachelor's degree.

In Pakistan, a bachelor's degree in computer science from FAST is highly regarded in the field of technology and is often considered equivalent in prestige to a MBBS degree from a reputable medical university in their respective fields.

==== Faculty of Computing ====
Dean: Jawwad Shamsi

Degrees offered:

- BS (Artificial Intelligence)
- BS (Computer Science)
- BS (Cyber Security)
- BS (Data Science)
- BS (Software Engineering)
- BS (Computer Engineering) *NEW*

==== Faculty of Engineering ====
Dean: Dr Mukhtar Ullah

Degrees offered:

- BS (Electrical Engineering)
- BS (Computer Engineering)
- BS (Civil Engineering)

==== Faculty of Management Sciences ====
Head of School: Dr. Sadia Nadeem

Degrees offered:

- BBA
- BS (Accounting and Finance)
- BS (Business Analytics)
- BS (Financial Technologies)

=== Graduate Studies ===
The university offers post graduate studies for different disciplines for master's in sciences and business, leading to a master's degree.

==== Faculty of Computing ====
Dean: Jawwad Shamsi

Degrees offered:

- MS (Artificial intelligence)
- MS (Computer Networks & Security)
- MS (Computer Science)
- MS (Data Science)
- MS (Software Engineering)
- MS (Software Project Management)

==== Faculty of Engineering ====
Dean: Mukhtar Ullah

Degrees offered:

- MS (Civil Engineering)
- MS (Electrical Engineering)

==== Faculty of Management Sciences ====
Dean: M. Ayub Siddiqui

Degrees offered:

- MBA
- MS (Accounting and Finance)
- MS (Business Analytics)
- MS (Management Sciences)

==== Faculty of Science & Humanities ====
Dean: Dr. Akhlaq Ahmad Bhatti

Degrees offered:

- MS (Applied in linguistics)
- MS (Mathematics)

=== Doctor of Philosophy ===
Degrees offered:

- PhD (Civil Engineering)
- PhD (Computer Science)
- PhD (Electrical Engineering)
- PhD (Management Sciences)
- PhD (Mathematics)
- PhD (Software Engineering)

== Notable alumni ==
- Farhan Saeed - singer, actor
- Fawad Khan – singer, actor
- Mir Zafar Ali – visual effects artist who won an Academy Award for the animated film Frozen (2013)
- Osman Khalid Butt – actor
- Xulfi – musician, singer, music producer, song composer
- Hania Amir — Actress
- Zain Shahid — Head of Performance Marketing at onic Pakistan

== Research labs ==
FAST-National university encourages the growth of research in university. It has its research labs in four campuses, Islamabad, Lahore, Peshawar and Karachi. It is further accredited as one of the leading research institutions of computer science in the country.

== See also ==
- List of medical schools in Pakistan
  - List of medical schools in Islamabad
  - List of medical schools in Punjab, Pakistan
  - List of medical schools in Sindh
  - List of medical schools in Balochistan
  - List of medical schools in Khyber Pakhtunkhwa
  - List of medical schools in Azad Kashmir
  - List of medical schools in Gilgit-Baltistan
- List of universities in Pakistan
  - List of universities in Islamabad
  - List of universities of Punjab, Pakistan
  - List of universities in Sindh
  - List of universities in Khyber Pakhtunkhwa
  - List of universities in Balochistan
  - List of universities in Azad Kashmir
  - List of universities in Gilgit-Baltistan
