= Indus University =

University in Pakistan

- جامعہَ انڈس
- The University's current logo
- Motto: Learn well to live well
- Type: Private
- Established: 2012 – Indus University; 2004 – Indus Institute of Higher Education
- Affiliations: Higher Education Commission of Pakistan; Pakistan Engineering Council
- Chancellor: Khalid Amin
- Vice-Chancellor: Muhammad Ahmed Amin
- Students: 5000+
- Undergraduates: 4000+
- Postgraduates: 1000+
- Location: Karachi, Sindh, Pakistan
- Colors: White & Maroon
- Nickname: IU
- Website: https://www.indus.edu.pk/

Indus University (Urdu: ا جامعہَ انڈس Sindhi: انڊس يونيورسٽي;), formerly Indus Institute of Higher Education, is a university in Pakistan. It is chartered by the government of Sindh and ranked with the top most category "W" by the Higher Education Commission of Pakistan (HEC). In 2013 CIEC (Charter Inspection and Evaluation Committee) of Pakistan placed Indus University in list of 5 Star Universities of Pakistan.

== Recognition and collaborations ==
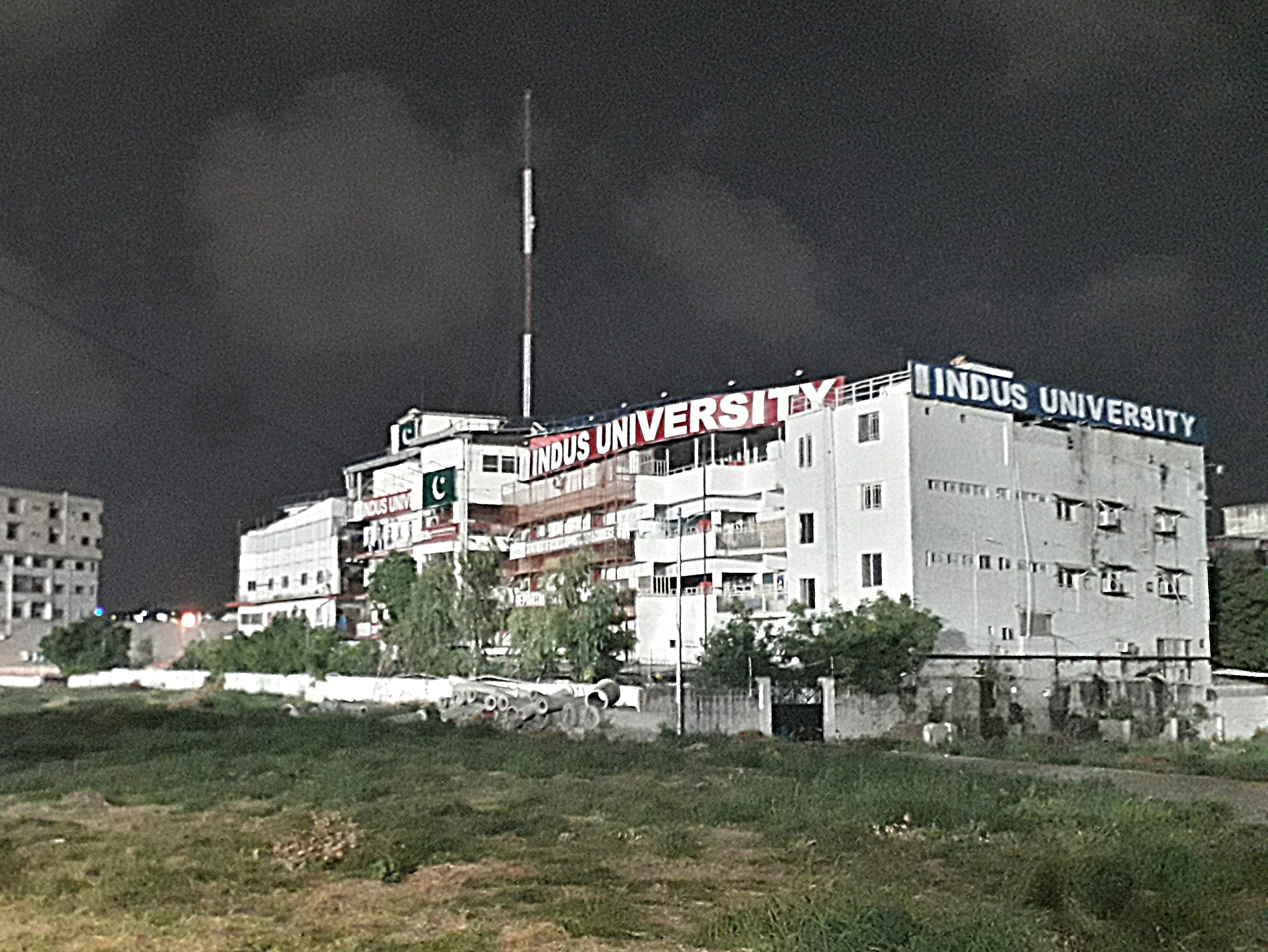
Indus University

Awarded Degree awarding status awarded by the Government of Sindh. The Indus Institute of Higher Education Bill, 2004 have been passed by the Provincial Assembly of Sindh on Monday 28 November 2005 and assented by the Government of Sindh on 7 January 2006, In 2012 Sindh Government upgraded Indus Institute of Higher Education to Indus University.

- Higher Education Commission of Pakistan, Islamabad Recognized as a "W" Category Institute.
- Education & Literacy Department, Government of Sindh, Karachi.
- Virtual University of Pakistan, Ministry of Science & Technology, Government of Pakistan
- Board of Intermediate Education, Karachi, Government of Sindh.
- Registered with Sindh Board of Technical Education.
- Executive District Officer- Colleges, City Government, Karachi.
- Pakistan Computer Bureau, Islamabad Government of Pakistan.
- Pakistan Engineering Council.
- University of Central Lancashire, UK

== Programs offered ==
The university offers undergraduate, graduate, and postgraduate programmes in engineering, film TV, business administration, DPT, and art & design disciplines. Indus University also offers associate degrees in different disciplines.

== International linkages ==
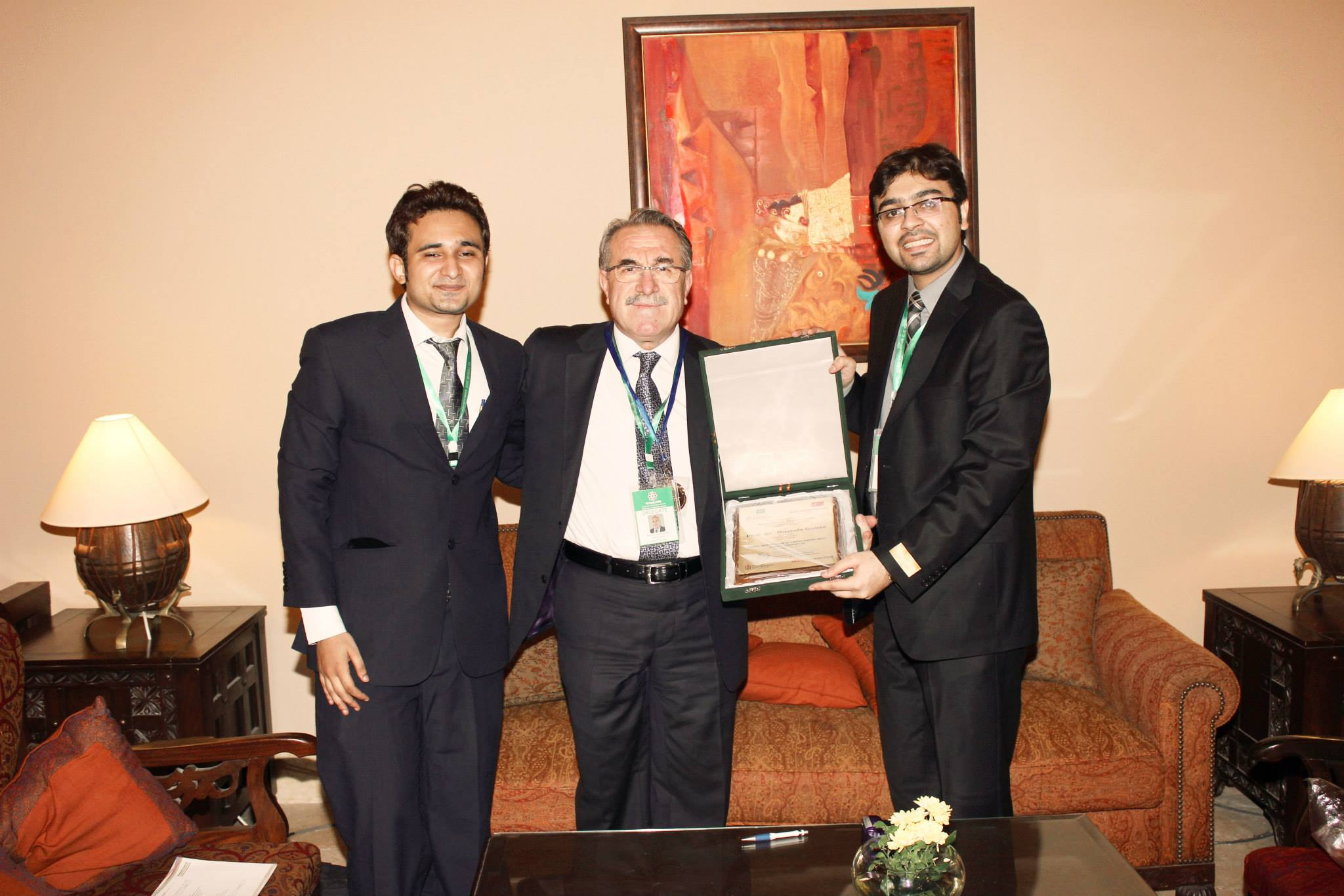
MoU Signing between Indus University and Gediz University

Indus University has signed an Memorandum of Understanding (MoU) with more than 40 International Universities. Collaborative arrangements help the resident and non-resident entities in numerous ways and act as a gateway to develop close ties and collaboration with other countries.

== Quality Enhancement Cell (QEC) ==
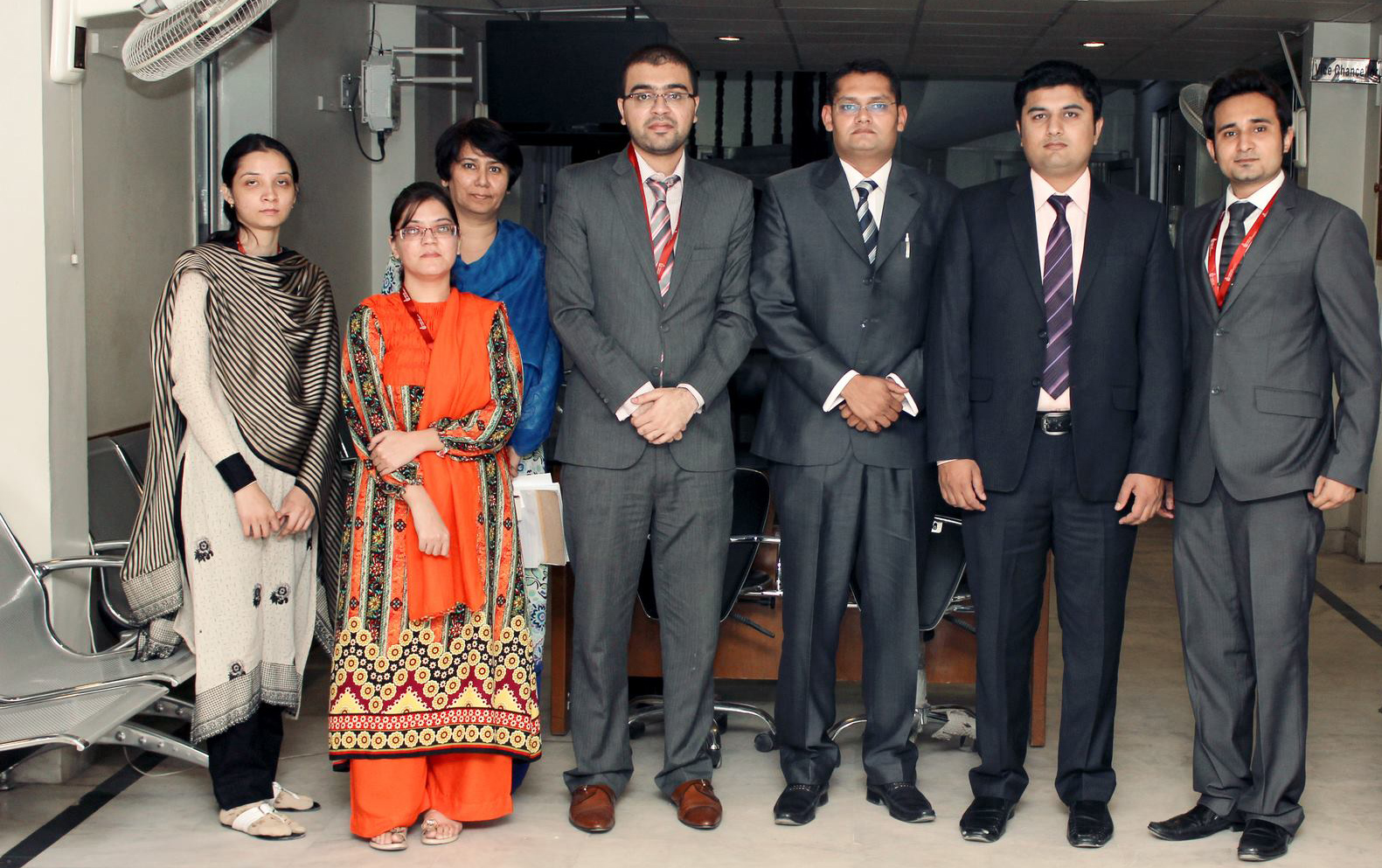
QEC Team of Indus University with team members of Quality Assurance Agency (QAA) HEC Pakistan

Quality Enhancement Cell (QEC) aims to strengthen the higher education sector of Pakistan by setting up an exemplary Quality Assurance mechanism that shall be congruent with the national and international practices.

The Quality Enhancement Cell (QEC) has been established at Indus University in the year 2010. It started functioning under the supervision of Muhammad Ahmed Amin, Vice Chancellor of Indus University. Initially, the programmes being offered by three departments namely; Business Administration, Information Sciences and Design department have been selected for the sake of assessment and evaluation.
