= University of Engineering and Technology, Taxila =

University in Pakistan

- جامعہ ہندسیہ و تکنیکیہ ٹیکسلا
- Motto: Nation needs professionals with knowledge, skill, innovation and commitment.
- Type: Public
- Established: 1975 - Sahiwal; 1978 - Relocated to Taxila
- Affiliations: Higher Education Commission (Pakistan); Pakistan Engineering Council; Washington Accord
- Chancellor: Governor of the Punjab
- Vice-Chancellor: Muhammad Inayatullah Khan
- Location: Taxila, Punjab, Pakistan
- Campus: Urban
- Colours: White and grey
- Nickname: UET Taxila
- Mascot: Taxilians
- Website: uettaxila.edu.pk

The University of Engineering and Technology, Taxila (UET Taxila) is a public university located in Taxila, Punjab, Pakistan. It was established in 1975 as a campus of the University of Engineering and Technology, Lahore and chartered as an independent university in 1993. It offers bachelor's, master's and doctoral degrees in engineering and applied sciences. University of Engineering and Technology, Taxila is officially recognized by the Higher Education Commission of Pakistan.

== History ==
With the increase in student enrollment in the 1970s in University of Engineering and Technology, Lahore, a constituent college of the university named University College of Engineering and Technology was built in Sahiwal in 1975. For three years, it functioned at Sahiwal and in 1978, it was shifted to its permanent location at Taxila. The college continued under the administrative control of the University of Engineering and Technology, Lahore until October 1993 when it received a charter as an independent university under the University of Engineering and Technology Taxila Ordinance of 1993. Enrollment of undergraduate and postgraduate students is about 5,000.

== Location ==
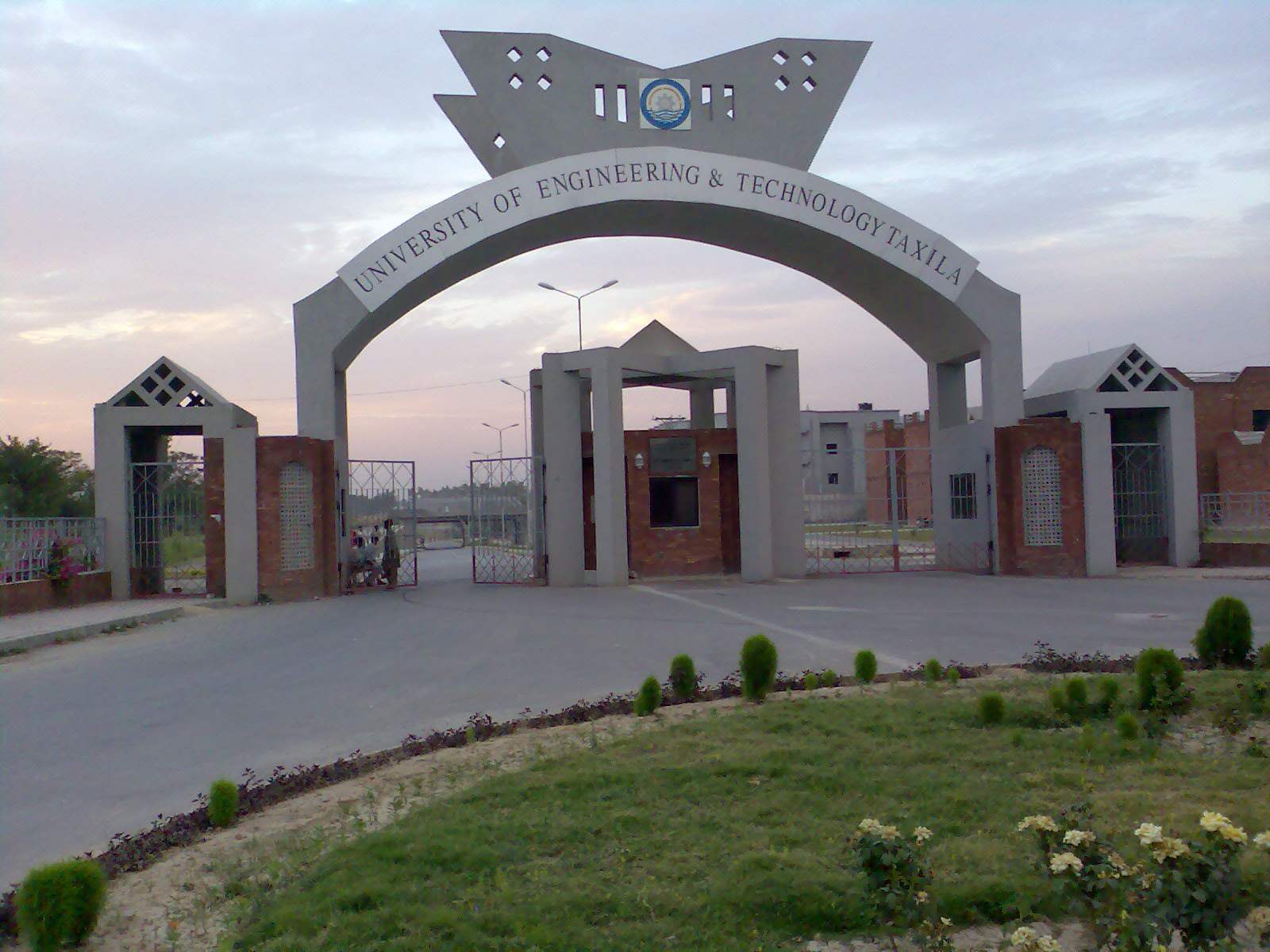
Main gate, UET Taxila

The campus is located on the outskirts of Taxila, 5 km (3.1 mi) from the city. It is situated near the railway station Mohra Shah Wali Shah on the Taxila-Havelian branch line. The famous Taxila museum is 3 km (1.9 mi) from the campus. There are some remnants of the ancient civilization of Taxila around the main campus. These include the Jandial Temple, the city of Sirkap, Bhir Mound, the ruins of the Dharmarajika Stupa, the monastery at Jaulian and the monastery at Mohra Muradu, Taxila museum.

The city of Taxila is 35 km (22 mi) from the twin cities of Islamabad and Rawalpindi and 6 km (3.7 mi) from the Rawalpindi-Peshawar highway (also known as GT Road). The campus covers an area of 109 acres (0.44 km^{2}) and houses the teaching departments, residential colony for teachers and employees, students' hostels, guest house, post office, dispensary and bank.

== Faculties and departments ==
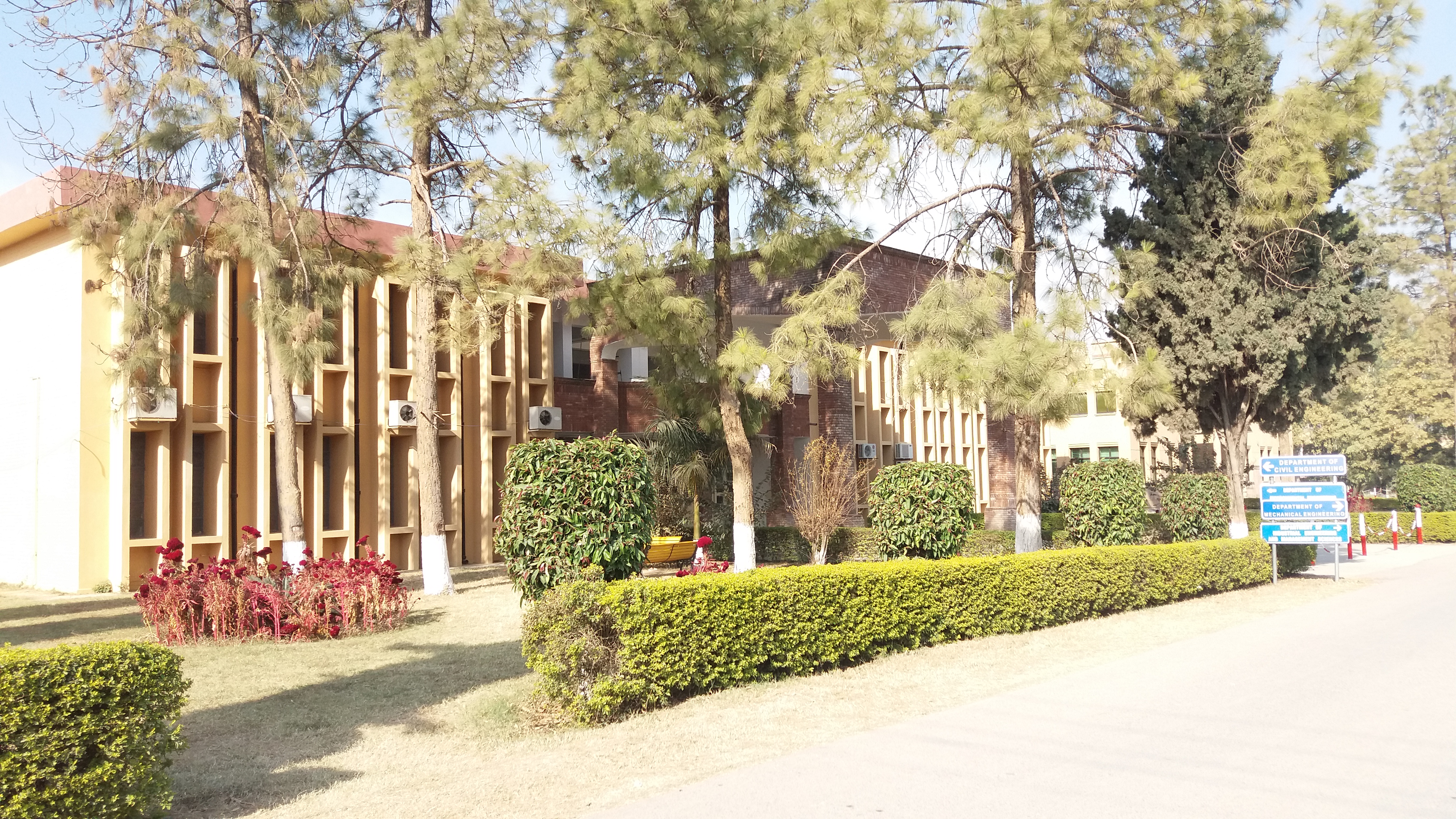
Department of Civil & Environmental Engineering

The university consists of following faculties and departments:

=== Faculty of Electronic and Electrical Engineering ===
- Department of Electrical Engineering
- Department of Electronics Engineering

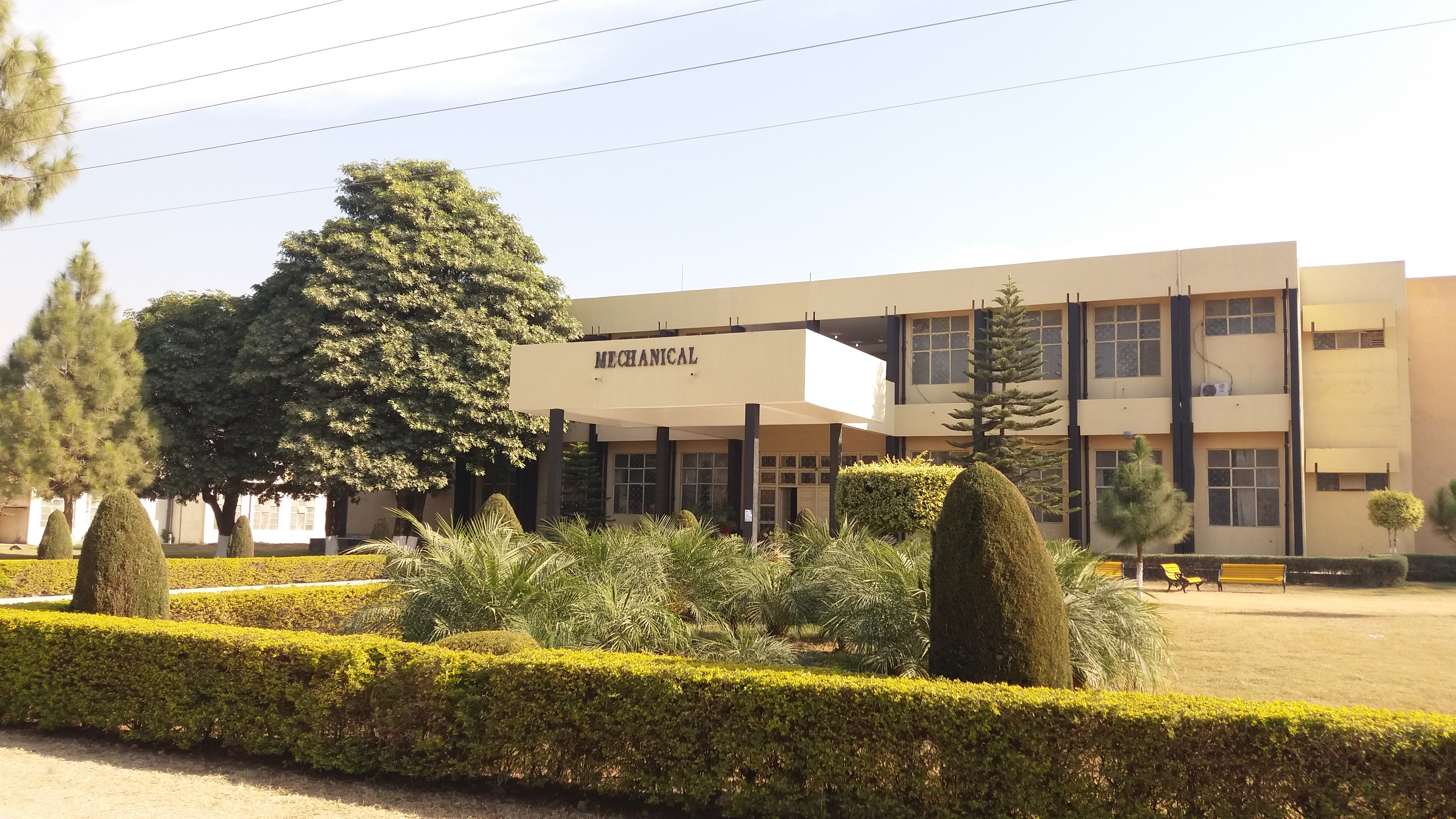
Department of Mechanical & Industrial Engineering

=== Faculty of Mechanical and Aeronautical Engineering ===
- Department of Mechanical Engineering
- Department of Metallurgy and Materials Engineering
- Department of Energy Engineering
- Department of Mechatronics Engineering

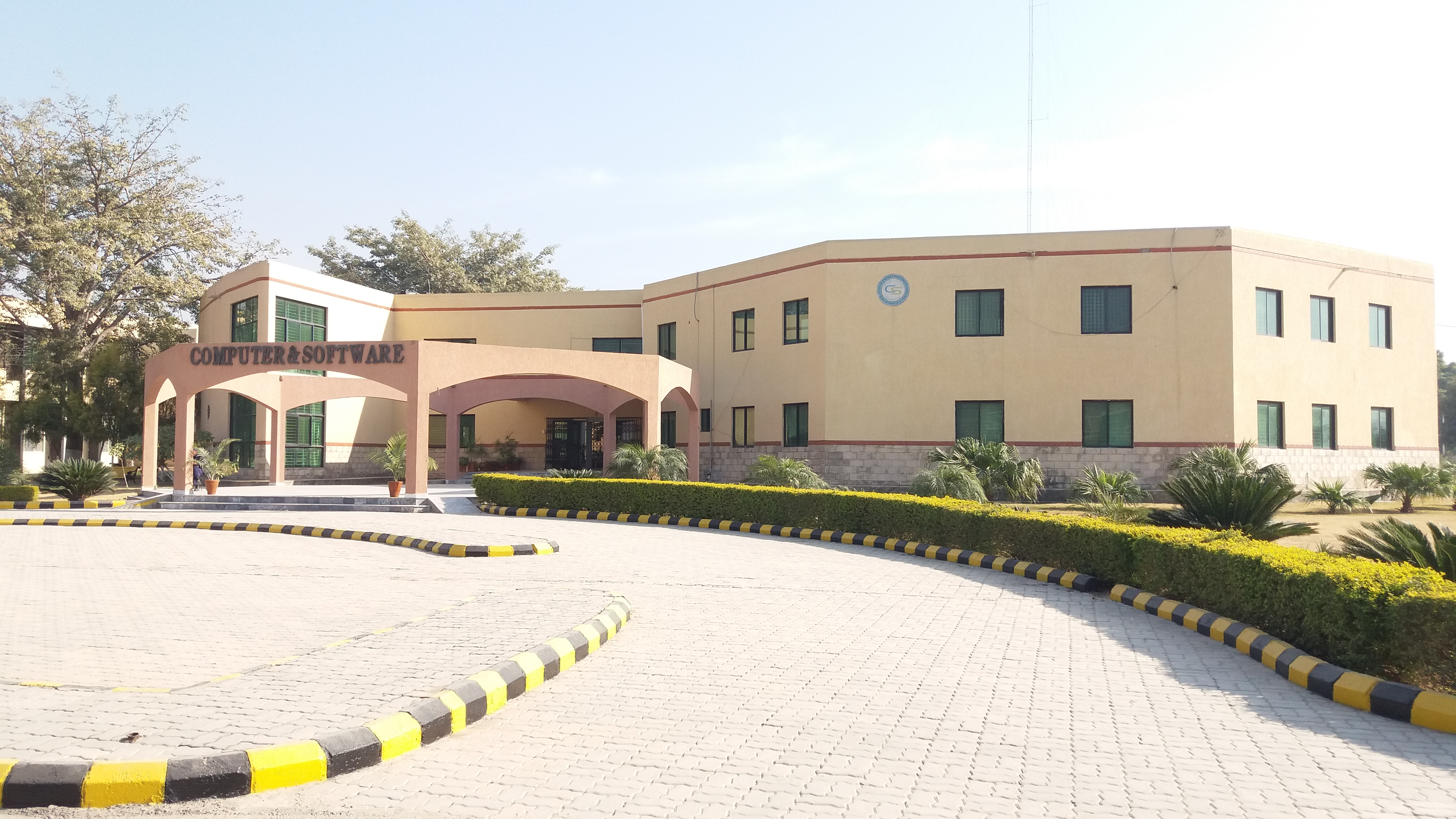
Department of Computer & Software Engineering

=== Faculty of Telecommunication and Information Engineering ===
- Department of Computer Engineering
- Department of Software Engineering
- Department of Telecommunication Engineering
- Department of Computer Science

=== Faculty of Civil and Environmental Engineering ===
- Department of Civil Engineering
- Department of Environmental Engineering

=== Faculty of Industrial Engineering ===
- Department of Industrial Engineering

Visit webpage

http://web.uettaxila.edu.pk/IE/index.asp

Visit Postgraduate Courses

http://web.uettaxila.edu.pk/IE/pg.asp

=== Faculty of Basic Sciences and Humanities ===
- Department of Humanities & Social Sciences
- Department of Mathematical Sciences
- Department of Physical Sciences

== Taxila Institute of Transportation Engineering ==
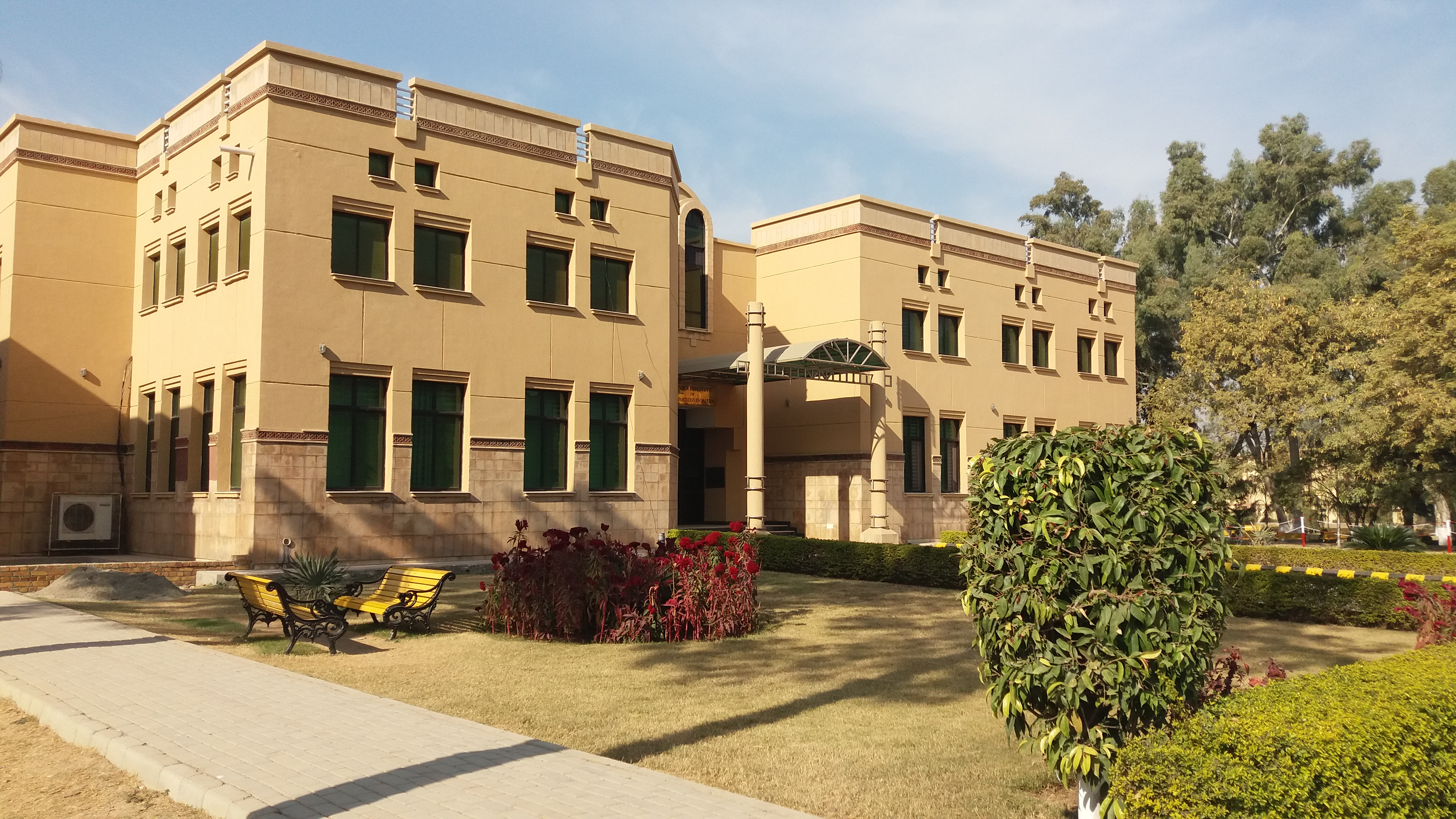
Taxila Institute of Transportation

The Taxila Institute of Transportation Engineering (TITE) was established by the Department of Civil Engineering to develop innovative methods, materials and technologies for improving transportation efficiency, safety and reliability. TITE has launched short courses called highway material engineer and highway material technician for highway engineers, material engineers and laboratory technicians. These courses are designed to increase the competency of these professions.

== Library ==
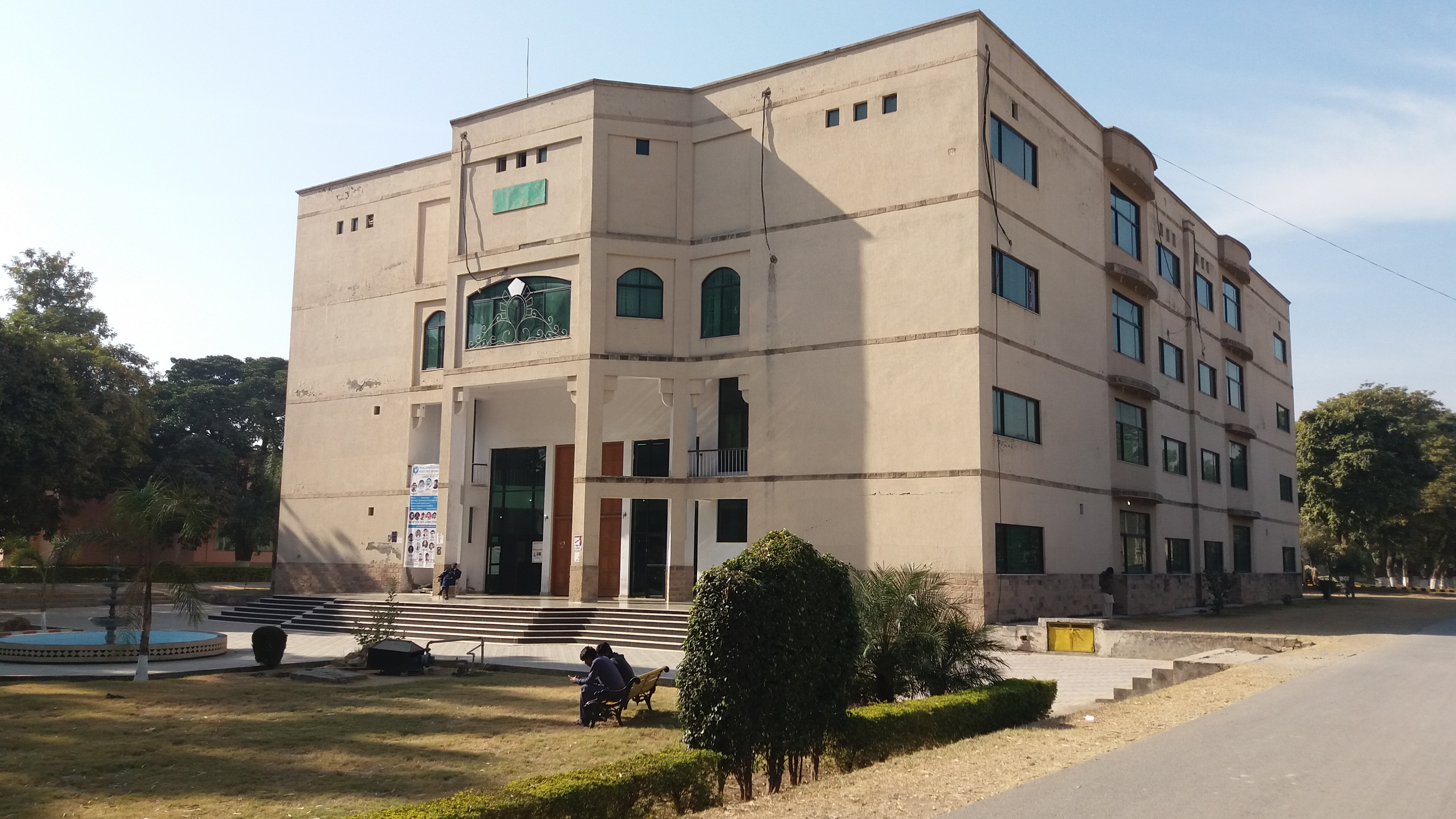
Central Digital Library

=== Central Library ===
The central library has a web-based library automation system named UET LIBAS. The Central Library has a seating capacity for 400 readers. The library remains open in 2 shifts from 8:00 am to 9:00 pm on all working days with usual break. The library has 63,501 volumes of books and 45,000 volumes of bound serials. Besides engineering subjects, there is material on humanities, social sciences and Islamic Studies. The library houses a Book Bank, which lends textbooks to undergraduates for long periods on a nominal rent. Books which are in excess of the requirements of the Book Bank, are sold to the students on a no-profit no-loss basis through its Co-operative Bookstore.

=== Digital Library ===
The university belongs to Pakistan Educational Research Network (PERN) which connects universities and research institutes in Pakistan through the internet. The Higher Education Commission has given online access to journals and research papers through PERN, so that they will have digital access to quality research materials. Access to all of these resources is free for students and researchers within the university intranet.

== Sports ==
A student common room is provided in each of the hostels with facilities for indoor games such as basketball, shooting ball, squash, table tennis, badminton and carrom. Outdoor games include cricket, hockey, volleyball and football. Other sports available are boxing, karate, athletics and bodybuilding. University holds a sports gala week every year.

== Student societies ==
- Society of Innovative Electrical Professionals (SIEP)
- UET Adventure Club (UETAC)
- UMEED-E-SUBH WELFARE SOCIETY
- UET Media Club (UMC)
- Student Counselling and Guidance Bureau (SCGB)
- American Society of Safety Professionals (ASSP)
- Quaid-e-Azam Debating Society (QDS)
- Association for Computing Machinery (ACM) Chapter, UET Taxila
- Environment Protection Society (EPS)
- Institute of Electrical and Electronics Engineers (IEEE), Student Branch, UET Taxila (IEEE-UET Taxila)
- American Society of Mechanical Engineers (ASME), UET Taxila Chapter (ASME UET Taxila)
- American Society of Heating, Refrigerating and Air-Conditioning Engineers (ASHRAE)
- Institution of Mechanical Engineers (IMechE), UET Taxila Chapter (IMechE UET Taxila)
- Institute of Industrial and Systems Engineers (IISE), UET Taxila Chapter (IISE UET Taxila)
- Institution of Civil Engineers (ICE) Student Chapter UET Taxila
- American Society of Civil Engineers (ASCE), UET Taxila Chapter (ASCE UET Taxila)
- Taxilian Robotics and Automation Club (TRAC)
- The Society of Computer Technology (COMPTECH)
- Society of Telecommunication Engineers & Professionals (STEP)
- University arts and literary society (UALS)

== Alumni Association ==
Alumni association is a link between the alumni and institute.

== Health Facilities ==
University provides medical facilities to its employees and students.

== Transport ==
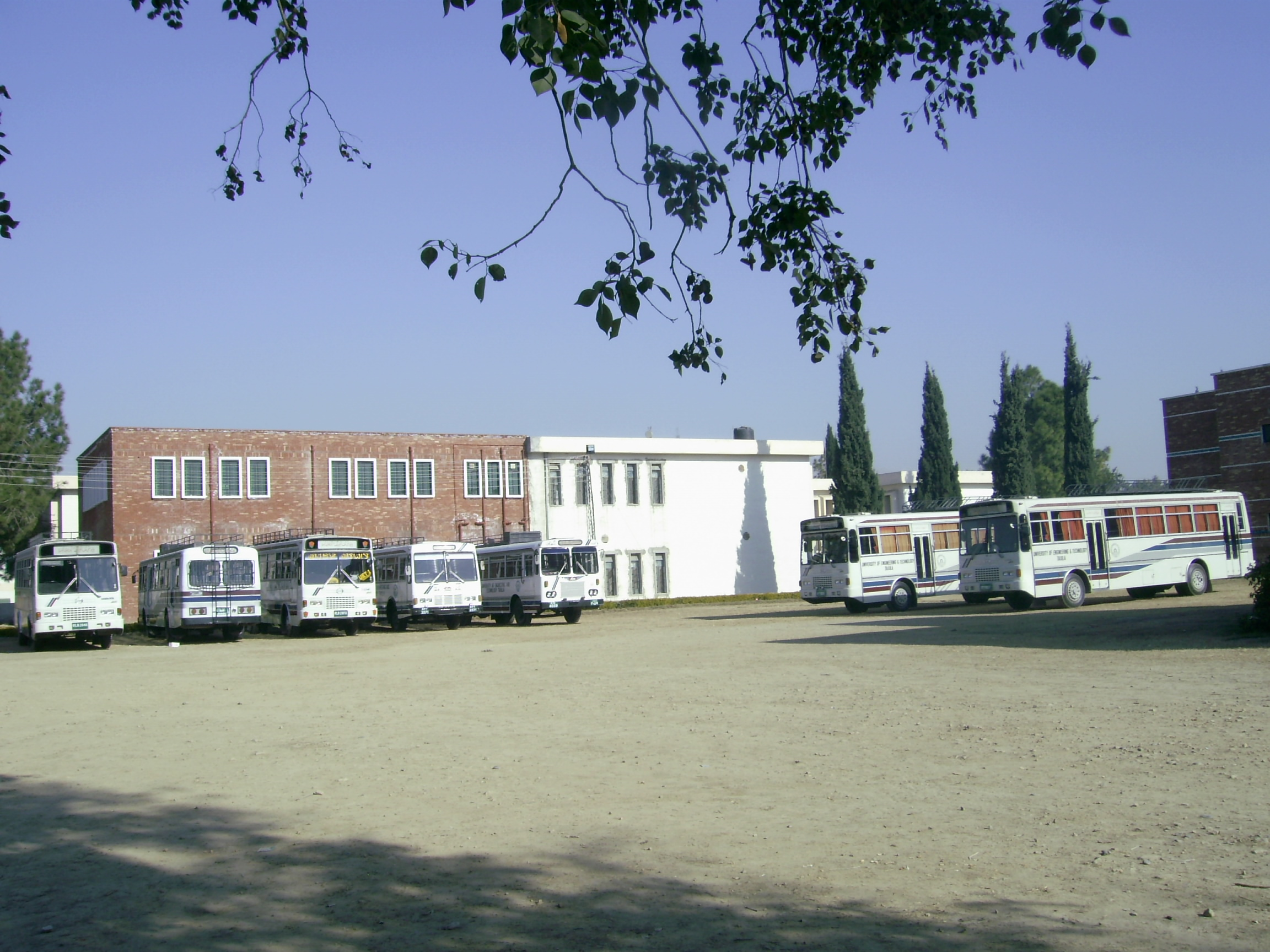
Buses of UET Taxila

Transport service is provided for students with buses traveling between Rawalpindi, Islamabad, Hassan Abdal, Wah Cantt and the campus.

== Hostels ==
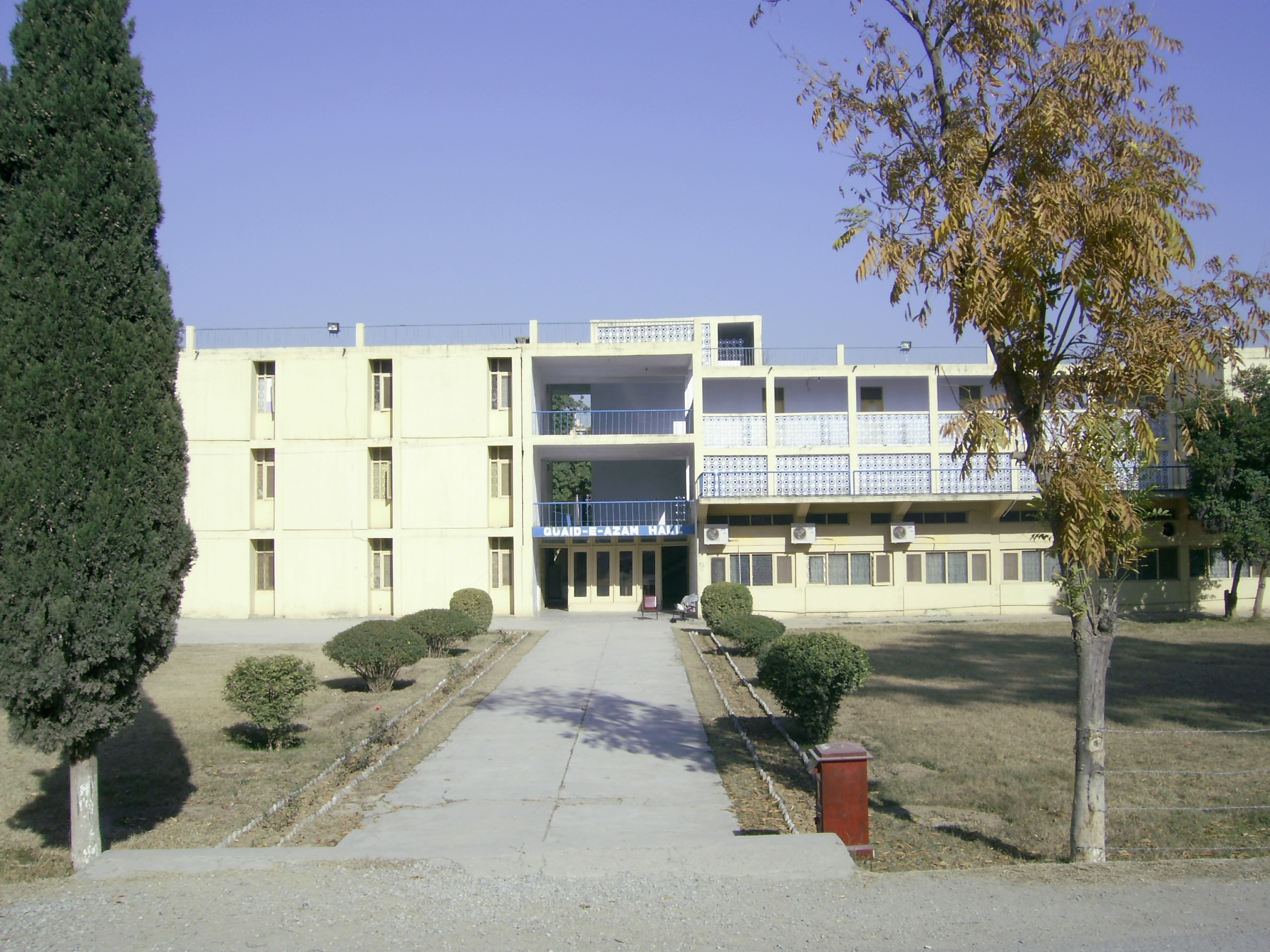
Quaid-e-Azam Hall

- Quad-e-Azam Hall
- Iqbal Hall
- Ali Hall
- Umar Hall
- Usman Hall
- Ayesha Hall
- Abubakkar Hall
- Jabar Bin Hayan Hall
- Muhammad Hall

== Central Mosque ==
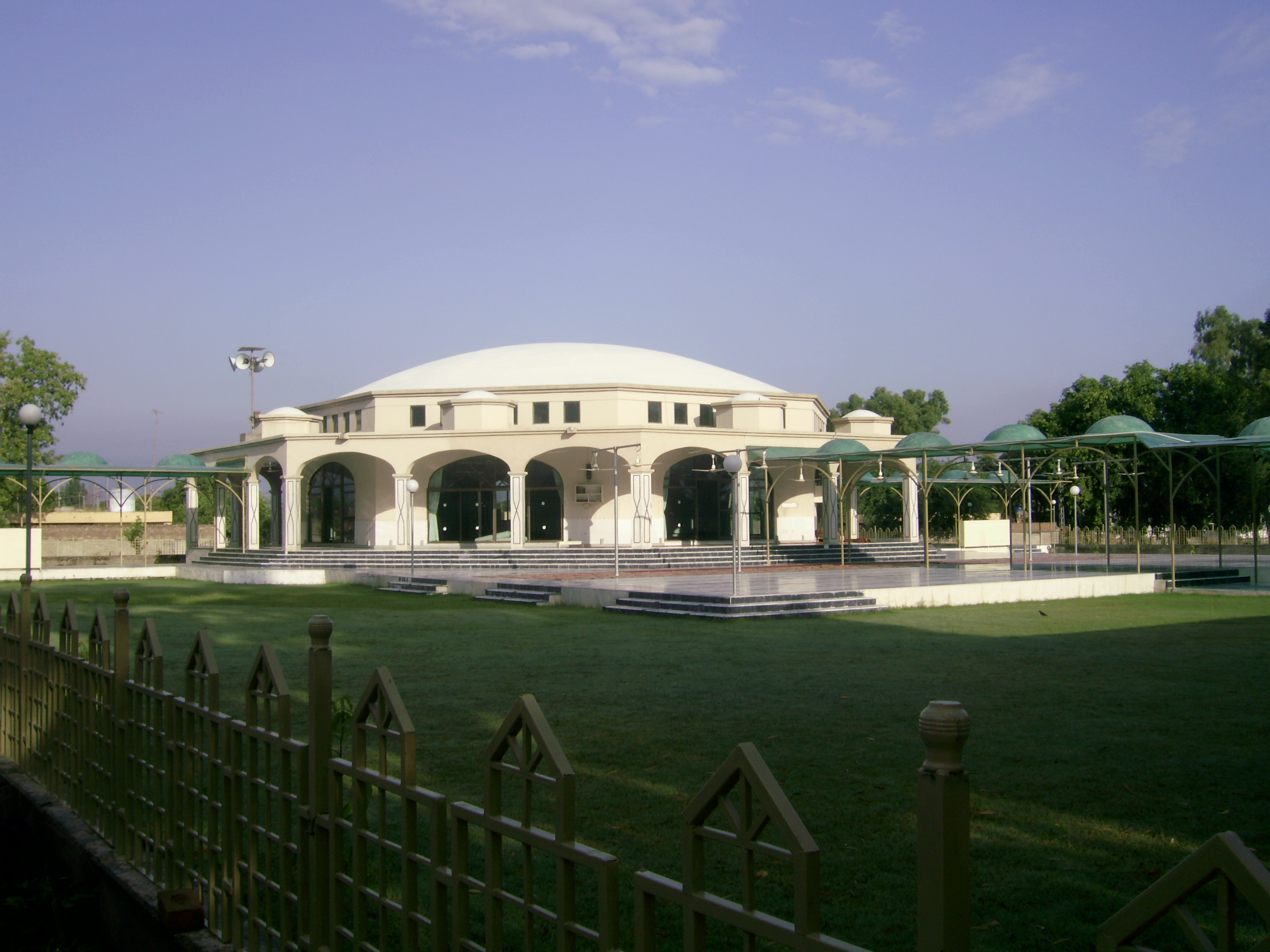
Central Mosque

There is a central mosque, also known as Mosque Bilal, that has a capacity for 700 worshipers.

== Sub campus ==
The university opened its second campus in Chakwal in 2005. It became an independent university (University of Chakwal) in 2020. Another campus is planned in Pind Dadan Khan, Jhelum District.

== See also ==
- Taxila, ancient city
