= National Technology Council (Pakistan) =

Accreditation body of the government of Pakistan

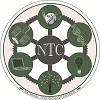
- Type: Governmental organization, Educational accreditation
- Headquarters: Islamabad, Pakistan
- Chairman: Imtiaz H. Gilani
- Parent organization: Higher Education Commission (Pakistan)
- Website: ntc-hec.org.pk

The National Technology Council (Urdu: قومی فنی انجمن; acronym NTC) is an accreditation body under the administrative control of Higher Education Commission. It accredits engineering technology degree programs. and also registers engineering technology graduates across the country.

== Registration of engineering technology graduates ==
The council registers engineering technology graduates in the following two categories

=== Registration as a graduate engineering technologist ===
Graduate with 4-year engineering technology degree is registered as a graduate engineering technologist.

=== Registration as a professional engineering technologist ===
Graduate with 4-year engineering technology degree and minimum five years relevant work experience is registered as a professional engineering technologist.

== See also ==
- National Business Education Accreditation Council
- National Computing Education Accreditation Council
