= National Computing Education Accreditation Council =

Pakistani governmental organization

National Computing Education Accreditation Council of Pakistan
- شورای قومی اعتباردهی تعلیم کمپیوٹر پاکستان
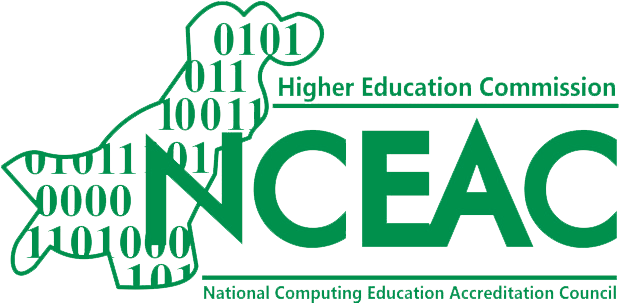
- Type: Governmental organization, Educational accreditation
- Headquarters: Islamabad, Pakistan
- Parent organization: Higher Education Commission (Pakistan)
- Website: nceac.org.pk

The National Computing Education Accreditation Council (NCEAC) is an accreditation body under the administrative control of Higher Education Commission (Pakistan). NCEAC grants accreditation to institutes of Pakistan regarding different computing degrees including Software Engineering, Computer Science, Information Technology, Telecommunication and Networking, Bioinformatics and Information Systems.

== See also ==
List of computing schools in Pakistan
