= Pakistan Engineering Council =

Govt. of Pakistan agency for regulation and licensure in engineering

- PEC شورای انجنیری پاکستان

Agency overview
- Formed: October 1, 1976; 50 years ago
- Type: Regulatory
- Jurisdiction: Government of Pakistan
- Headquarters: Islamabad, Pakistan; 33.72392751544481°N 73.09317506975134°E
- Motto: Regulating the Engineering Profession
- Annual budget: FY-26 federal budget
- Agency executives: Wasim Nazir, PE Chairman; Dr. Sarosh Hashmat Lodi Senior Vice-Chairman
- Parent agency: Ministry of Science & Technology
- Key document: PEC Act of 1976
- Website: www.pec.org.pk

The Pakistan Engineering Council (PEC) is an independent federal agency under the Ministry of Science and Technology (MOST) whose mission is to regulate engineering profession and practices while providing the accreditation of engineering education in Pakistan.

Besides accredition of engineering degrees, the PEC registers and grants licenses to engineers to provide engineering consultany to the active firms as well as taking steps in promoting the engineering education in the country.

== Overview ==
The Pakistan Engineering Council (PEC) was established as a regulatory corporate agency through the parliamentary legislation on 10 January 1976. Established of the PEC as a regulatory agency was a result of long-drawn lobbying of engineering community at the highest levels of the Government of Pakistan to regulate the safe engineering practices and promotion of engineering education in the country.

On the matters of engineering and environmental development, the PEC represents the engineering interests of the development projects to the federal government of Pakistan as well as the provincial governments. Among its duties also relates to act as an education accredition agency and as a engineering consultant to the federal government on undertaking efforts in establishing the scientific measurements and standards for innovation and services to the benefit of the country.

In 2001, the peer review of quality of engineering education in the nation was conducted by the PEC which was critical in making the Higher Education Commission (HEC) to review the quality of the engineering education programs to produce the most qualified engineers to uplift the economic development of the country.

In 2010, the PEC became a provisional member of the Washington Accord and was admitted as a full member in 2017, which strenghthened its position as a credential accredition agency worldwide.

In 2011, it became a provisional member of the International Professional Engineer (IntPE) Agreement (IPEA), and became a full member in 2018.

In 2021, PEC signed a memorandum of understanding with the Shenzhen University to develop and apply Internet of things as part of the Belt and Road Initiative in China and Pakistan.

The PEC headquarters are located in Islamabad and with regional offices in all major metropolitan cities of Pakistan.

== Affiliations ==
- Washington Accord
- International Professional Engineers Agreement (IPEA)
- Federation of Engineering Institutions of Asia and the Pacific (FEIAP)
- Federation of Engineering Institutions of Islamic Countries (FEIIC)
- Network of Accreditation Bodies for Engineering Education in Asia (NABEEA)

== Corporate affairs ==
=== Headquarters and regional offices ===
The Pakistan Engineering Council's headquarters are located in Islamabad. On 28 July 1987, the civil engineering construction of the headquarters' began when President Muhammad Zia-ul-Haq laid the foundation stone and the headquarters' building was inaugurated by Prime Minister Nawaz Sharif on 14 October 1992.

The PEC has regional offices in four provinces, namely its head offices are located in the provincial capitals.

- Karachi Branch Office (inaugurated on 23 June 1987)
- Lahore Branch Office (inaugurated on 30 January 1988)
- Quetta Branch Office (inaugurated on 17 February 1988)
- Peshawar Branch Office (inaugurated on 27 March 1988)
- Multan Branch Office (inaugurated on 1 June 2016)
- Hyderabad Branch Office (inaugurated on 1 June 2016)

== See also ==
- List of engineering universities and colleges in Pakistan
