= List of universities in Karachi =

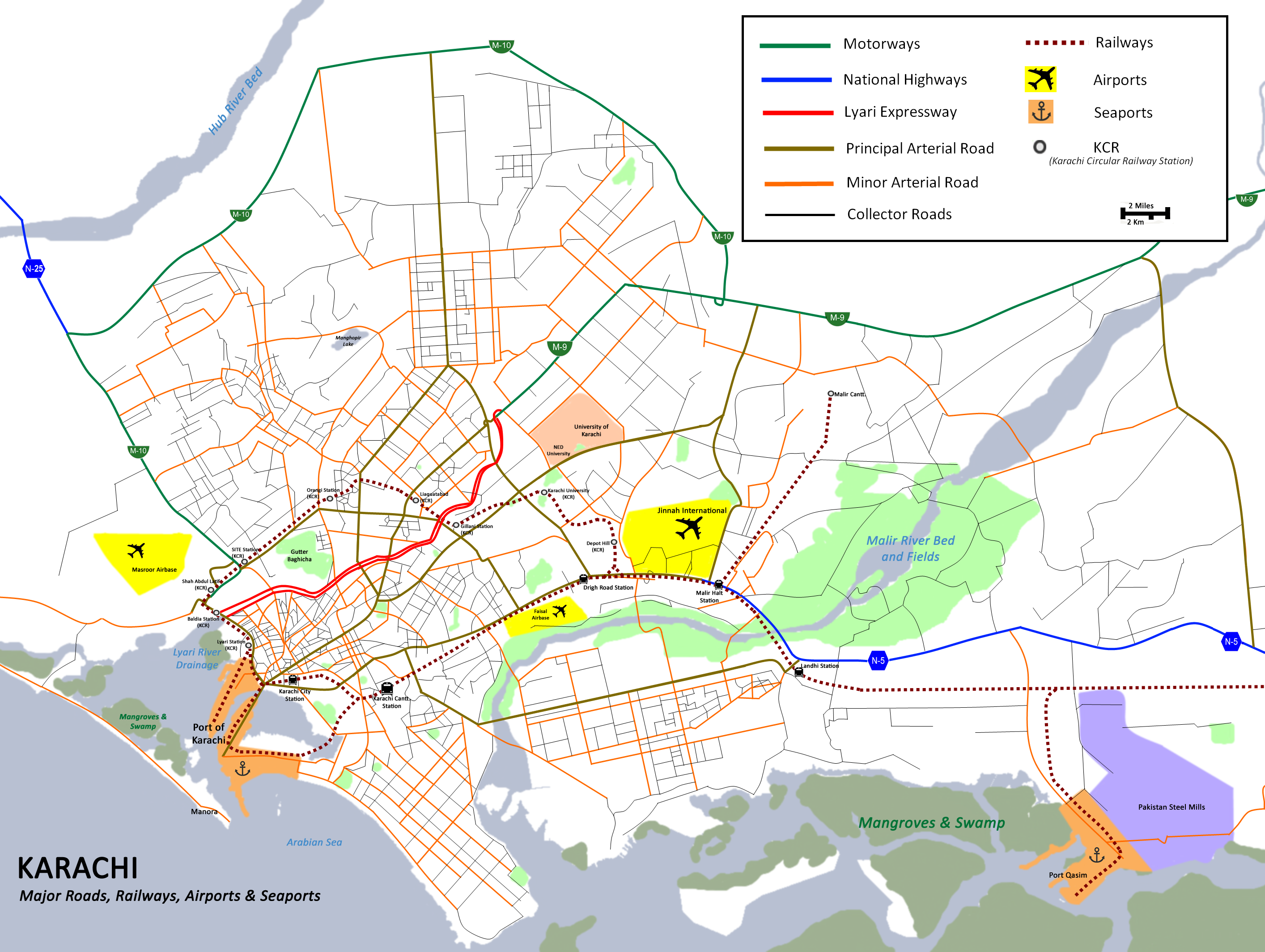
Location of some universities in Karachi

There are a number of higher education institutions in Karachi, Sindh, Pakistan. These include universities supported by the federal government of Pakistan and the provincial government of Sindh. There are also several private universities supported by various bodies and societies. The Higher Education Commission of Pakistan maintains a list of recognized universities.

== List ==
*Date of grant of university status.

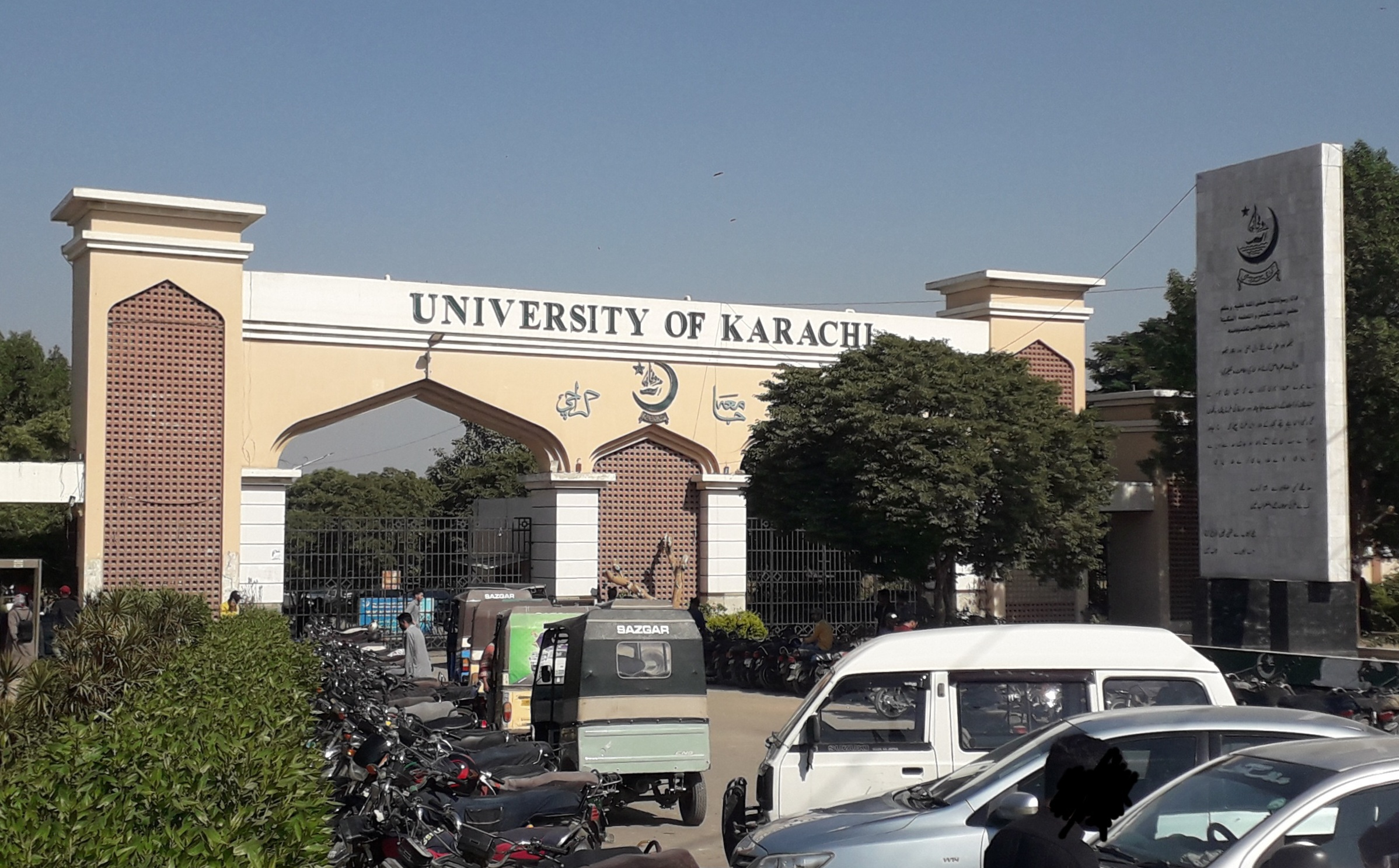
Silver Jubilee Gate of Karachi University

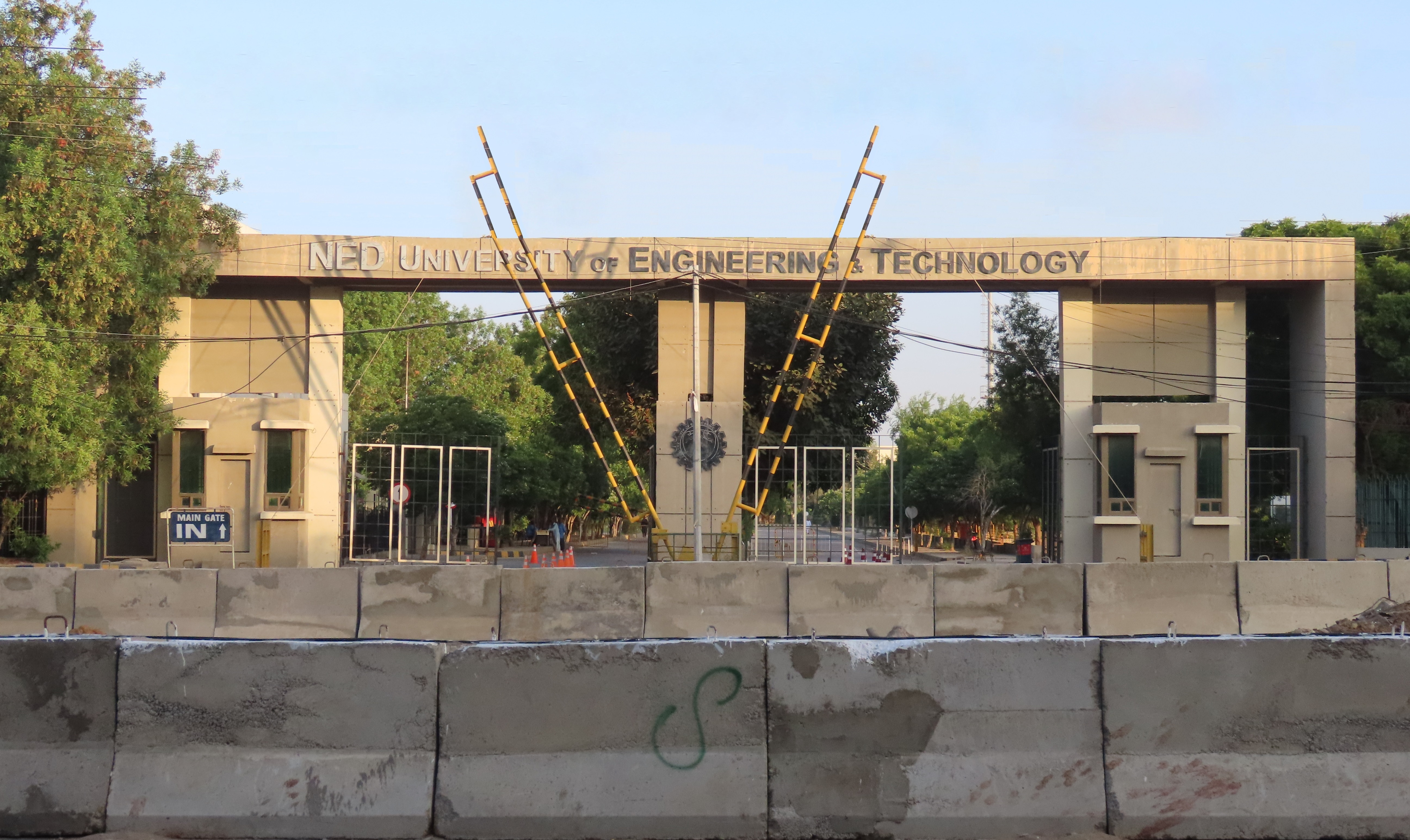
NED is considered best for Engineering

University	Type	Established	Specialization	Website
UIT University	Private	1994	Computer Science, Software Engineering, IT	
Hamdard University	Private	1991	General	
DHA Suffa University	Private	2012	Computer Science, Engineering, Business	
Greenwich University	Private	1998	Business	
University of Karachi	Public	1951	General	
National University of Computer and Emerging Sciences, FAST-NUCES	Private	1980	Computer Science, Engineering	
Sindh Madressatul Islam University	Public	1885	General	
NED University of Engineering and Technology	Public	1921 (1977)*	Engineering and Technology	
Dawood University of Engineering and Technology	Public	1962 (2007)*	Engineering	
Sir Syed University of Engineering and Technology	Private	1993	Engineering	
Karachi Institute of Economics and Technology	Private	1997	Engineering, management, Computer Science	
Shaheed Zulfiqar Ali Bhutto Institute of Science and Technology	Private	1995	Technology, management, general	
National University of Computer and Emerging Sciences, Karachi campus	Private	1985	Computer science	
Aga Khan University	Private	1983	Medical sciences	
Dow University of Health Sciences	Public	1945 (2003)*	Medical sciences	
Ziauddin University	Private	1995	Medical sciences	
Baqai Medical University	Private	1988	Medical sciences	
Karachi Medical and Dental College	Public	1991	Medical sciences	
Benazir Bhutto Shaheed University	Public	2010	Medical sciences	
Institute of Business Administration, Karachi	Private	1955	Business studies	
Karachi School of Business and Leadership	Private	2012	Business studies	
Institute of Business Management	Private	1995	Business management, engineering and technology	
Virtual University of Pakistan, Lahore campus	Private	2000	Computer science	
Nazeer Hussain University, FB area	Private	2012	Engineering, business, pharmacy	
Altamash Institute of Dental Medicine, Punjab Chowrangi	Private	1980s	Health sciences	
Adamson Institute of Business Administration and Technology	Private	2005	Business Administration	
Bahria University, Karachi campus	Public/naval	2000	General	
Federal Urdu University, Karachi campus	Public	2002	General	
Preston Institute of Management Science and Technology	Private	2001	Management, technology and business studies	
Pakistan Marine Academy	Public	1962		
Pakistan Naval Academy	Public	1970		
Pakistan Navy Engineering College	Public	1966	Engineering	
Sindh Madrasatul Islam	Public	1885 (2012)*	General	
Dadabhoy Institute of Higher Education	Private	2003	General	
Indus University	Private	2002	Business administration; electrical engineering; textile, interior & fashion designing; science & technology	
Indus Valley School of Art and Architecture	Private	1989	Arts and architecture	
Ilma University	Private	2001	Computer Sciences, Media Sciences, Business Administration	
Iqra University	Private	1998		
Jinnah University for Women	Private	1998	General	
KASB Institute of Technology	Private	1999	General	
Mohammad Ali Jinnah University	Private	1998	General	
Newports Institute of Communications & Economics	Private	1999	Management, technology and economics	
Preston University, Pakistan	Private	1984	General	
Textile Institute of Pakistan	Private	1994	Textile and apparel (design/science/business)	
Habib University	Private	2014	Liberal arts and sciences, computer science and engineering	
Karachi Institute of Technology and Entrepreneurship	Private	2013	Business, computer science, law, architecture and design	
Sindh Institute of Management and Technology	Private	2015	Arts and sciences, computer science and engineering Technology	
MiTE - Millennium Institute of Technology and Entrepreneurship	Private	2022	Computer Science, Business and Fashion Designing	
National Textile University Karachi Campus	Public University	1959	Textile Engineering, Fashion Design & Technology, Polymer and Textile Chemistry, Textile Management & Marketing	
Salim Habib University	Private University	2016	Bio Medical Engineering, Bio Sciences, Computer Science, Pharmacy, BBA, MBA & BS(Accounting & Finance)	
National University of Modern Languages NUML, Karachi Campus	Public University	2008	Computer Science, Psychology, BBA, MBA, MPhil & BS Islamic studies, BEd, BS English, Languages	

== Other institutions ==
- APIIT (Asia Pacific Institute of Information Technology)
- COMMECS Institute of Business and Emerging Sciences
- Dar-ul-Uloom, Amjadia (ur)
- Dar-ul-Uloom, Karachi
- Fatima Jinnah Dental College
- Institute of Industrial Electronics Engineering (PCSIR)
- Karachi School of Art
- National Institute of Management, Karachi
- Pakistan Institute of Management
- Usman Institute of Technology
- Aleemiyah Institute of Islamic Studies
- Aligarh Institute of Technology
- Jamia Binoria
- Jamia Tur Rasheed, Karachi
- Jamia Uloom-ul-Islamia
- Salim Habib University
- Shaheed Benazir Bhutto City University
- Shaheed Benazir Bhutto Dewan University

== See also ==
- Higher Education Commission of Pakistan
- List of colleges in Karachi
- List of universities in Pakistan
  - List of universities in Islamabad
  - List of universities of Punjab, Pakistan
  - List of universities in Sindh
  - List of universities in Khyber Pakhtunkhwa
  - List of universities in Balochistan
  - List of universities in Azad Kashmir
  - List of universities in Gilgit-Baltistan
