= List of universities in Pakistan =

Higher education in Pakistan is the systematic process of students continuing their education beyond secondary school, learned societies and two-year colleges. The governance of higher education is maintained under the Higher Education Commission (Pakistan) (HEC) which oversees the financial funding, research outputs and teaching quality in the country. In Pakistan, the higher education system includes the public, private and military universities accredited by the HEC. Since independence, new universities have expanded throughout the country with support provided by the University Grants Commission (UGC), which had been an autonomous institution of recognizing universities until 2002 when it was preceded by the Higher Education Commission. Pakistan produces about 445,000 university graduates and 10,000 computer science graduates annually. Following public and private higher education institutions are active in the country:

== Islamabad ==
No.	University	Location	Established	Campuses	Specialization	Type
1	Riphah International University	Islamabad	2002	Rawalpindi, Faisalabad, Lahore, Malakand	General	Private
2	Capital University of Science & Technology	Islamabad	1998		General	Private
3	Quaid-i-Azam University	Islamabad	1967		General	Public
4	Pakistan Institute of Engineering and Applied Sciences	Islamabad	1967			Public
5	National Defence University, Pakistan	Islamabad	1970		General	Public
6	Allama Iqbal Open University	Islamabad	1974		General	Public
7	International Islamic University, Islamabad	Islamabad	1980		General	Public
8	National University of Sciences and Technology, Pakistan	Islamabad	1991	Quetta	General	Public
9	COMSATS University	Islamabad	1998			Public
10	National University of Computer and Emerging Sciences	Islamabad	2000	Chiniot, Karachi, Lahore, Peshawar	General	Private
11	Bahria University	Islamabad	2000	Karachi, Lahore	General	Public
12	Sir Syed CASE Institute of Technology	Islamabad	2001	Islamabad	General	Private
13	Federal Urdu University of Arts, Science and Technology	Islamabad	1949	Karachi	General	Public
14	Institute of Space Technology	Islamabad	2002		General	Public
15	Foundation University, Islamabad	Islamabad	2002	Rawalpindi, Sialkot	General	Private
16	National University of Modern Languages	Islamabad	1969	Rawalpindi, Faisalabad, Lahore, Multan, Karachi, Hyderabad, Peshawar, Quetta, Gwadar, Mirpur	General	Public
17	Air University, Islamabad	Islamabad	2002	Multan,Kharian, Kamra	General	Public
18	Virtual University of Pakistan	Islamabad	2002	Across the entire Pakistan	General	Public
19	Shifa Tameer-e-Millat University	Islamabad	2012		General	Private
20	Shaheed Zulfiqar Ali Bhutto Medical University	Islamabad	2013		Medical	Public
21	Muslim Youth University	Islamabad	2013		General	Private
22	National University of Technology	Islamabad	2018		Engineering & Technology	Public
23	Pakistan Institute of Development Economics	Islamabad	1957		General	Public
24	National Skills University	Islamabad	2018		Engineering & Technology	Public
25	IBADAT International University	Islamabad	1998		General	Private

== Balochistan ==
No.	University	Location	Established	Campuses	Specialization	Type
1	University of Balochistan	Quetta	1970	Mastung, Kharan,	General	Public
2	Balochistan University of Engineering and Technology	Khuzdar	1987	Hub city ^{(purposed)}	Engineering & Technology	Public
3	Al-Hamd Islamic University	Quetta	1995	Islamabad	General	Private
4	Balochistan University of Information Technology, Engineering and Management Sciences	Quetta	2002	Zhob	Engineering & Technology	Public
5	Sardar Bahadur Khan Women's University	Quetta	2004	Noshki, Pishin, Khuzdar^{(purposed)}	General	Public
6	Lasbela University of Agriculture, Water and Marine Sciences	Lasbela	2005	Wadh, Dera Murad Jamali	General	Public
7	University of Turbat	Turbat	2012		General	Public
8	University of Loralai	Loralai	2009		General	Public
9	Mir Chakar Khan Rind University	Sibi	2019		General	Public
10	University of Gwadar	Gwadar	2016		General	Public
11	University of Makran	Panjgur	2022		General	Public
12	Bolan University of Medical & Health Sciences	Quetta	1972		Medical	Public
13	University of Pishin	Pishin	2026		General	Public
14	Shaheed Mir Sikandar Zehri University, Khuzdar	Khuzdar	2026		General	Public

== Khyber Pakhtunkhwa ==
No.	University	Location	Established	Campuses	Specialization	Type
1	Islamia College University	Peshawar	1913		General	Public
2	Pakistan Military Academy	Abbottabad	1947		General	Military
3	Pakistan Air Force Academy	Risalpur	1947		Engineering & Aviation	Military
4	University of Peshawar	Peshawar	1950		General	Public
5	University of Engineering and Technology, Peshawar	Peshawar	1952	Abbottabad, Bannu, Jalozai, Kohat	Engineering & Technology	Public
6	Gomal University	Dera Ismail Khan	1974	Tank	General	Public
7	University of Agriculture, Peshawar	Peshawar	1981	Mardan	Agriculture	Public
8	Preston University	Kohat	1984	Karachi, Islamabad, Lahore, Peshawar	General	Private
9	CECOS University of Information Technology and Emerging Sciences	Peshawar	1986		Engineering & Technology	Private
10	Ghulam Ishaq Khan Institute of Engineering Sciences and Technology	Swabi	1993		Engineering & Technology	Private
11	Gandhara University	Peshawar	1995		General	Private
12	Institute of Management Sciences Peshawar	Peshawar	1995		Management sciences & Technology	Public
13	IQRA National University	Peshawar	2000	Swat	General	Private
14	Kohat University of Science and Technology	Kohat	2001	Hangu	Engineering & Technology	Public
15	University of Malakand	Chakdara	2001		General	Public
16	Qurtuba University	Peshawar	2001	Dera Ismail Khan	General	Private
17	Sarhad University of Science and Information Technology	Peshawar	2001	Mardan, United Arab Emirates	Engineering & Technology	Private
18	City University of Science and Information Technology, Peshawar	Peshawar	2001		Engineering & Technology	Private
19	Hazara University	Mansehra	2002	Battagram	General	Public
20	Northern University, Nowshera	Nowshera	2002		General	Private
21	University of Science and Technology Bannu	Bannu	2005		Engineering & Technology	Public
22	Shaheed Benazir Bhutto Women University	Peshawar	2005		General	Public
23	Khyber Medical University	Peshawar	2007	Abbottabad, Bannu, Dera Ismail Khan, Saidu Sharif	Medical Sciences	Public
24	Abasyn University	Peshawar	2007	Islamabad	General	Private
25	Abbottabad University of Science and Technology	Abbottabad	2008		Engineering & Technology	Public
26	Abdul Wali Khan University Mardan	Mardan	2009	Chitral, Pabbi	General	Public
27	Shaheed Benazir Bhutto University, Sheringal	Upper Dir	2009	Chitral	General	Public
28	University of Swat	Swat	2010		General	Public
29	Bacha Khan University	Charsadda	2012		General	Public
30	University of Haripur	Haripur	2012		General	Public
31	Khushal Khan Khattak University	Karak	2012		General	Public
32	University of Swabi	Swabi	2012		General	Public
33	University of Buner	Buner	2012		General	Public
34	University of Technology, Nowshera	Nowshera	2015		Engineering & Technology	Public
35	Women University Mardan	Mardan	2016		General	Public
36	Women University Swabi	Swabi	2016		General	Public
37	FATA University	Akhorwal	2016		General	Public
38	University of Chitral	Chitral	2017		General	Public
39	University of Lakki Marwat	Lakki Marwat	2017		General	Public
40	University of Engineering and Technology, Mardan	Mardan	2018		Engineering & Technology	Public
41	University of Agriculture, Dera Ismail Khan	Dera Ismail Khan	2018		General	Public
42	Pak-Austria Fachhochschule: Institute of Applied Sciences and Technology	Haripur	2020		Science & Technology	Public
43	University of Dir	Timergara	2021		General	Public
44	University of Engineering & Applied Sciences	Swat	2021		Engineering & Technology	Public
45	University of Shangla	Shangla	2022		General	Public
46	University of Veterinary & Animal Science	Swat	2023		Agriculture & Veterinary	Public

== Punjab ==
	University	Location	Established	Campuses	Specialization	Type
1	University of the Punjab	Lahore	1882	Gujranwala, Jhelum, Khanspur	General	Public
2	King Edward Medical University	Lahore	1860		General	Public
3	University of Engineering and Technology, Lahore	Lahore	1921	Faisalabad, Sheikhupura, Gujranwala, Narowal	General	Public
4	Forman Christian College University	Lahore	1864		General	Private
5	National College of Arts	Lahore	1875	Rawalpindi	Arts & Design	Public
6	University of Veterinary and Animal Sciences	Lahore	1882	Jhang, Pattoki, Narowal, Layyah	General	Public
7	Punjab Tianjin University of Technology	Lahore	2018		Engineering & Technology	Public
8	Kinnaird College for Women University	Lahore	1913		General	Public
9	Government College University, Lahore	Lahore	1864		General	Public
10	Lahore College for Women University	Lahore	1922		General	Public
11	Fatima Jinnah Medical University	Lahore	1941		Medical	Public
12	Pir Mehr Ali Shah Arid Agriculture University	Rawalpindi	1970		General	Public
13	Fatima Jinnah Women University	Rawalpindi	1998		General	Public
14	Rawalpindi Medical University	Rawalpindi	1974		Medical	Public
15	National University of Medical Sciences	Rawalpindi	2015		Medical	Public
16	Rawalpindi Women University	Rawalpindi	2019		General	Public
17	Government Viqar-un-Nisa Women University	Rawalpindi	2022		General	Public
18	University of Agriculture, Faisalabad	Faisalabad	1906	Burewala, Toba Tek Singh, Depalpur	General	Public
19	Namal University	Mianwali	2008		Engineering & Technology	Private
20	Government College University, Faisalabad	Faisalabad	1897	Layyah, Sahiwal, Chiniot	General	Public
21	National Textile University	Faisalabad	1959	Karachi	General	Public
22	Bahauddin Zakariya University	Multan	1975	Layyah, Vehari	General	Public
23	The Islamia University of Bahawalpur	Bahawalpur	1925	Bahawalnagar, Rahim Yar Khan	General	Public
24	University of Engineering and Technology, Taxila	Taxila	1975		General	Public
25	Lahore University of Management Sciences	Lahore	1984		General	Private
26	NFC Institute of Engineering and Technology	Multan	1985		Engineering & Technology	Public
27	Institute of Management Sciences, Lahore	Lahore	1987		General	Private
28	University of Management and Technology, Lahore	Lahore	1990	Sialkot	General	Private
29	National College of Business Administration and Economics	Lahore	1994	Multan, Bahawalpur, Rahim Yar Khan	General	Private
30	University of Central Punjab	Lahore	1999		General	Private
31	University of Sargodha	Sargodha	1916		General	Public
32	University of Health Sciences, Lahore	Lahore	2002		General	Public
33	University of Education	Lahore	2002	Attock, Dera Ghazi Khan, Faisalabad, Jauharabad, Multan, Vehari	General	Public
34	GIFT University	Gujranwala	2002		General	Private
35	IISAT University	Gujranwala	2022		General	Private
36	Hajvery University	Lahore	2002	Sheikhupura	General	Private
37	Faisalabad Medical University	Faisalabad	1973		Medical	Public
38	University of Faisalabad	Faisalabad	2002		General	Private
39	University of Lahore	Lahore	1999	Sargodha	General	Private
40	Beaconhouse National University	Lahore	2003		General	Private
41	University of South Asia	Lahore	2003		General	Private
42	University of Gujrat	Gujrat	2004	Lahore, Rawalpindi, Narowal, Mandi Bahauddin	General	Public
43	Superior University	Lahore	2000	Okara, Sargodha, Rahim Yar Khan, Faisalabad	General	Private
44	Minhaj University, Lahore	Lahore	1986		General	Private
45	HITEC University	Taxila	2007		General	Private
46	University of Wah	Wah	2005		General	Private
47	Pakistan Institute of Fashion and Design	Lahore	1994		Arts & Design	Public
48	Women University Multan	Multan	2010		General	Public
49	Institute of Southern Punjab	Multan	2010		General	Private
50	Qarshi University	Lahore	2011		General	Private
51	Government College Women University, Sialkot	Sialkot	2012		General	Public
52	Government Sadiq College Women University	Bahawalpur	2012		General	Public
53	Ghazi University	Dera Ghazi Khan	2012		General	Public
54	Government College Women University, Faisalabad	Faisalabad	2012		General	Public
55	Information Technology University of the Punjab	Lahore	2012		Engineering & Technology	Public
56	Muhammad Nawaz Sharif University of Agriculture	Multan	2012		Agriculture & Veterinary	Public
57	Muhammad Nawaz Sharif University of Engineering and Technology	Multan	2012		General	Public
58	Lahore Garrison University	Lahore	2010		General	Private
59	Cholistan University of Veterinary and Animal Sciences	Bahawalpur	2014		Agriculture & Veterinary	Public
60	Khawaja Fareed University of Engineering and Information Technology	Rahim Yar Khan	2014		Engineering & Technology	Public
61	Punjab University of Technology, Rasul	Mandi Bahauddin	1873		Engineering & Technology	Public
62	University of Sahiwal	Sahiwal	2015		General	Public
63	University of Okara	Okara	2015		General	Public
64	University of Jhang	Jhang	2015		General	Public
65	NUR International University	Lahore	2015		General	Private
66	University of Sialkot	Sialkot	2013		General	Private
67	Lahore School of Economics	Lahore	1997		Medical	Public
68	University of Home Economics Lahore	Lahore	1955		General	Public
69	Mir Chakar Khan Rind University of Technology	Dera Ghazi Khan	2019		Engineering & Technology	Public
70	Institute for Art and Culture	Lahore	2018		Arts & Design	Public
71	University of Narowal	Narowal	2018		General	Public
72	Al-Qadir University	Sohawa	2021		Sufism	Public
73	Baba Guru Nanak University	Nankana Sahib	2021		General	Public
74	University of Chakwal	Chakwal	2020		General	Public
75	University of Mianwali	Mianwali	2012		General	Public
76	Thal University	Bhakkar	2012		General	Public
77	Green International University	Lahore	2020		General	Private
78	Kohsar University Murree	Murree	2020		General	Public
79	Lahore Institute of Science and Technology	Lahore	2022		General	Private
80	Grand Asian University Sialkot	Sialkot	2022		General	Private
81	The University of Chenab	Gujrat	1999		General	Private
82	International Institute of Science, Art and Technology	Gujranwala	2022		General	Private
83	Institute of Management & Applied Sciences	Khanewal	2017		General	Private
84	University of Layyah	Layyah	2009		General	Public
85	Rashid Latif Khan University	Lahore	2021		General	Private
86	Multan University of Science & Technology	Multan	2022		General	Private
87	Times Institute	Multan	2008		General	Private
88	Nishtar Medical University	Multan	1951		Medical	Public
89	Emerson University, Multan	Multan	1920		General	Public
90	Ghazi National Institute of Engineering & Sciences	Dera Ghazi Khan	2021		General	Private
91	University of Sahiwal	Sahiwal	2015		General	Public

== Sindh ==
	University	Location	Established	Campuses	Specialization	Type
1	Liaquat University of Medical and Health Sciences	Jamshoro	1881	Thatta	Medical Science	Public
2	Sindh Madressatul Islam University	Karachi	1885		General	Public
3	NED University of Engineering and Technology	Karachi	1922	Tharparkar	Engineering Science	Public
4	Dow University of Health Sciences	Karachi	1945		Medical Science	Public
5	University of Sindh	Jamshoro	1947	Badin, Dadu, Mirpur Khas, (till 2024)Naushahro Feroze, Thatta, Larkana ^{(till 2024)}	General	Public
6	University of Karachi	Karachi	1951		General	Public
7	Institute of Business Administration, Karachi	Karachi	1955		General	Public
8	Dawood University of Engineering and Technology	Karachi	1962		Engineering & Technology	Public
9	Mehran University of Engineering and Technology	Jamshoro	1963	Khairpur, Sujawal, Jacobabad, Umerkot	Engineering & Technology	Public
10	Pakistan Naval Academy	Karachi	1970		General	Military
11	Shah Abdul Latif University	Khairpur	1974	Ghotki,Shahdadkot	General	Public
12	Quaid-e-Awam University of Engineering, Science and Technology	Benazirabad	1974	Larkana, Jacobabad	Engineering & Technology	Public
13	Sindh Agriculture University	Tandojam	1939	Khairpur, Umerkot, Dokri ^{(till 2024)}	Agriculture Science	Public
14	Indus Valley School of Art and Architecture	Karachi	1989		Arts, Design & Architecture	Private
15	Baqai Medical University	Karachi	1989		Medical Science	Private
16	Hamdard University	Karachi	1991	Islamabad	General	Private
17	Commecs institute of business and emerging sciences	Karachi	1993		General	Private
18	Sir Syed University of Engineering and Technology	Karachi	1993		Engineering Science	Private
19	Sukkur IBA University	Sukkur	1994	Hyderabad, Larkana, Mirpurkhas, Kandhkot	Engineering & Administration	Public
20	Textile Institute of Pakistan	Karachi	1994		Textile & Manufacturing	Private
21	Institute of Business Management	Karachi	1995		Management Science	Private
22	Shaheed Zulfiqar Ali Bhutto Institute of Science and Technology	Karachi	1995	Hyderabad, Islamabad, Larkana, Gharo, United Arab Emirates	Engineering & Technology	Private
23	Isra University	Hyderabad	1997	Islamabad, Karachi	General	Private
24	Karachi Institute of Economics and Technology	Karachi	1997		General	Private
25	Greenwich University, Karachi	Karachi	1987	Mauritius	General	Private
26	Jinnah University for Women	Karachi	1998		General	Private
27	Iqra University	Karachi	1998	Islamabad, Quetta	General	Private
28	Dadabhoy Institute of Higher Education	Karachi	2000		General	Private
29	Ilma University	Karachi	2001		General	Private
30	Preston University	Karachi	2001		General	Private
31	Indus University	Karachi	2004		General	Private
32	University of EAST	Hyderabad	2004		General	Private
33	Aga Khan University	Karachi	1983	London	General	Private
34	Shaheed Mohtarma Benazir Bhutto Medical University	Larkana	2008		General	Public
35	Muhammad Ali Jinnah University	Karachi	1998		General	Private
36	Sindh Institute of Medical Sciences	Karachi	2009		General	Private
37	Karachi School for Business and Leadership	Karachi	2009		General	Private
38	Habib University	Karachi	2009		General	Private
39	Benazir Bhutto Shaheed University	Karachi	2010		General	Public
40	Shaheed Benazir Bhutto University, Benazirabad	Benazirabad	2010	Sanghar, Naushehro Feroze	General	Public
41	KASB Institute of Technology	Karachi	2011		General	Private
42	Pir Abdul Qadir Shah Jeelani Institute of Medical Sciences	Khairpur	2003		General	Public
43	Jinnah Sindh Medical University	Karachi	1973		General	Public
44	Shaheed Zulfiqar Ali Bhutto University of Law	Karachi	2012		General	Public
45	DHA Suffa University	Karachi	2002		General	Private
46	Nazeer Hussain University	Karachi	2012		General	Private
47	Peoples University of Medical and Health Sciences for Women	Benazirabad	2013		General	Public
48	Shaheed Benazir Bhutto University of Veterinary and Animal Sciences	Benazirabad	2012		General	Public
49	Newports Institute of Communications and Economics	Karachi	2013		General	Private
50	Shaheed Benazir Bhutto City University	Karachi	2013		General	Private
51	Shaheed Benazir Bhutto Dewan University	Karachi	2013		General	Private
52	Qalandar Shahbaz University of Modern Sciences	Karachi	2013		General	Private
53	Benazir Bhutto Shaheed University of Technology and Skill Development	Khairpur	1950		Engineering & Technology	Public
54	Begum Nusrat Bhutto Women University	Sukkur	2018		General	Public
55	University of Sufism and Modern Sciences	Bhit Shah	2011		General	Public
56	Government College University Hyderabad	Hyderabad	1917		General	Public
57	Shaikh Ayaz University	Shikarpur	2011		General	Public
58	Ziauddin University	Karachi	1986	Sukkur	General	Public
59	Salim Habib University	Karachi	2015		General	Private
60	60 Sohail University	Karachi	2018		General	Private
61	University of Art and Culture, Jamshoro	Jamshoro	2018		Arts & Design	Private
62	Shaheed Allah Bux Soomro University of Art, Design and Heritages	jamshoro	1990		Arts & Design	Public
63	Aror University of Art, Architecture, Design & Heritage	Sukkur	2013		Arts & Design	Public
64	Millennium Institute of Technology and Entrepreneurship	Karachi	2021		General	Private
65	Hyderabad Institute for Technical & Management Sciences	Hyderabad	2023		General	Public
66	City University of Health Sciences	Karachi	1991		Medical	Public
67	Karachi Institute of Technology & Entrepreneurship	Karachi	2013		General	Private
68	Emaan Institute of Management and Sciences	Karachi	2018		General	Private
69	Malir University of Science and Technology	Karachi	2017		General	Private
70	Karachi Institute of Power Engineering (KINPOE)-College of PIEAS	Karachi	1993	Hawksbay Road, Karachi, Constituent College of Pakistan Institute of Engineering & Applied Sciences (PIEAS)	Nuclear Power Engineering & Technology	Public
71	University of Larkano	Larkana	2024	^{Bill passed on 26 July 23 in Sindh Assembly}	General	Public
72	University of Mirpurkhas	Mirpurkhas	purposed	^{Bill passed on 26 July 23 in Sindh Assembly} (Sindh University campus upgraded to full fledged University)	General	
73	University of Thar	Tharparkar@Mithi	purposed	_{May be the Campus of University of Sindh/University of Mirpurkhas}	General _{(} _{Later may be full fledged university)}	

== Azad Kashmir ==
	University	Location	Established	Campuses	Specialization	Type
1	Mirpur University of Science and Technology	Mirpur	2008	Bhimber	General	Public
2	University of Azad Jammu and Kashmir	Muzaffarabad	1980	Neelam, Jhelum Valley	General	Public
3	University of Poonch	Rawalakot	2014	Sudhanoti, Haveli	General	Public
4	Al-Khair University	Mirpur	1994		General	Private
5	Mohi-ud-Din Islamic University	Nerian Sharif	2000		General	Private
6	Women University of Azad Jammu and Kashmir Bagh	Bagh	2013		General	Public
7	University of Kotli	Kotli	2014		General	Public

== Gilgit-Baltistan ==
	University	Location	Established	Campuses	Specialization	Type
1	Karakoram International University	Gilgit	2002	Hunza Valley, Ghizar, Chilas	General	Public
2	Baltistan University	Skardu	2017		General	Public

== Gallery ==
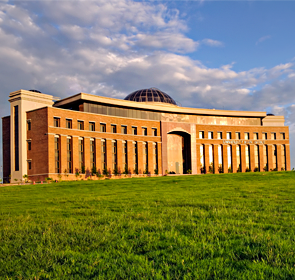
NUST main office

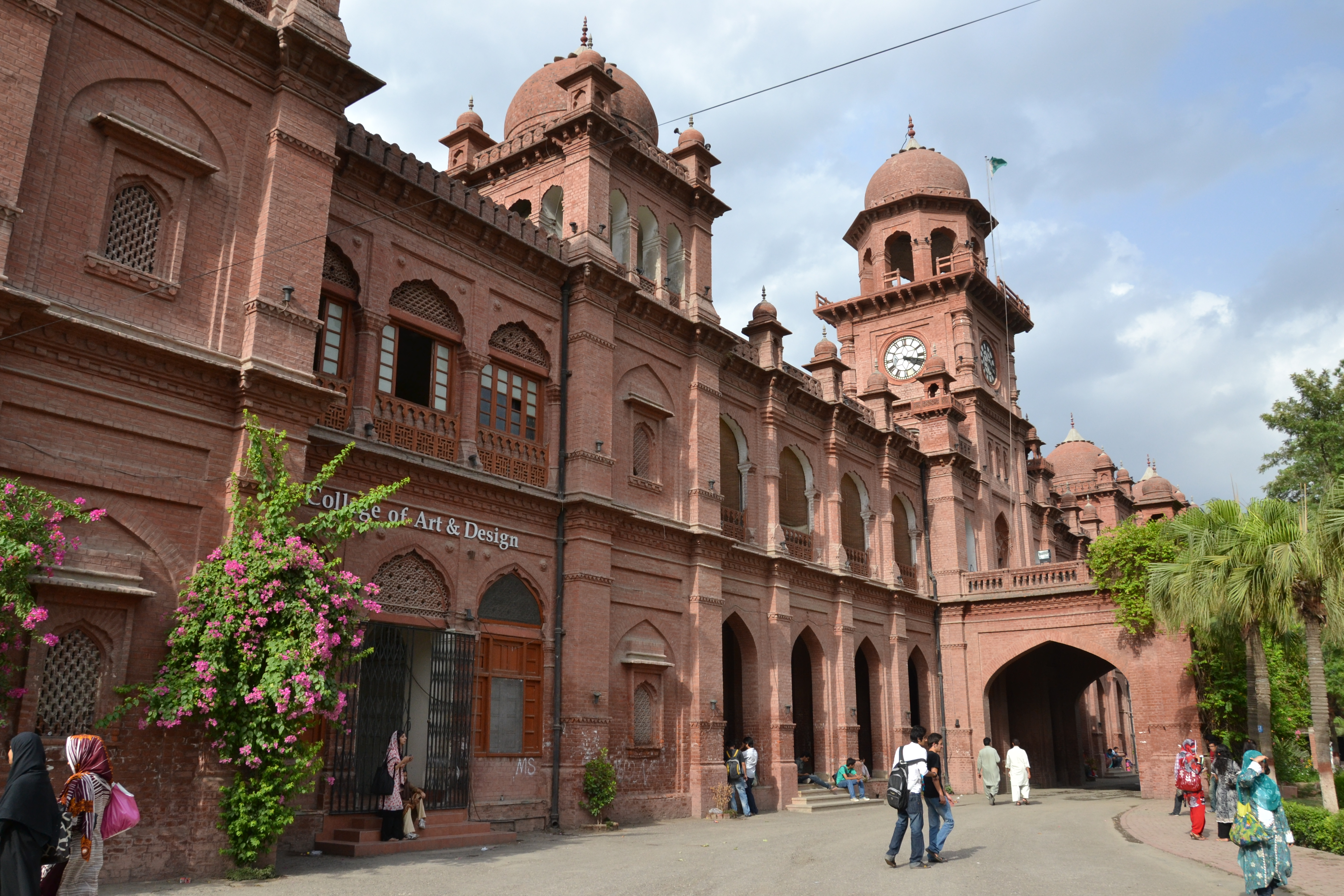
University of the Punjab, established in 1882 in Lahore, is one of the oldest institutions of higher learning in Pakistan.

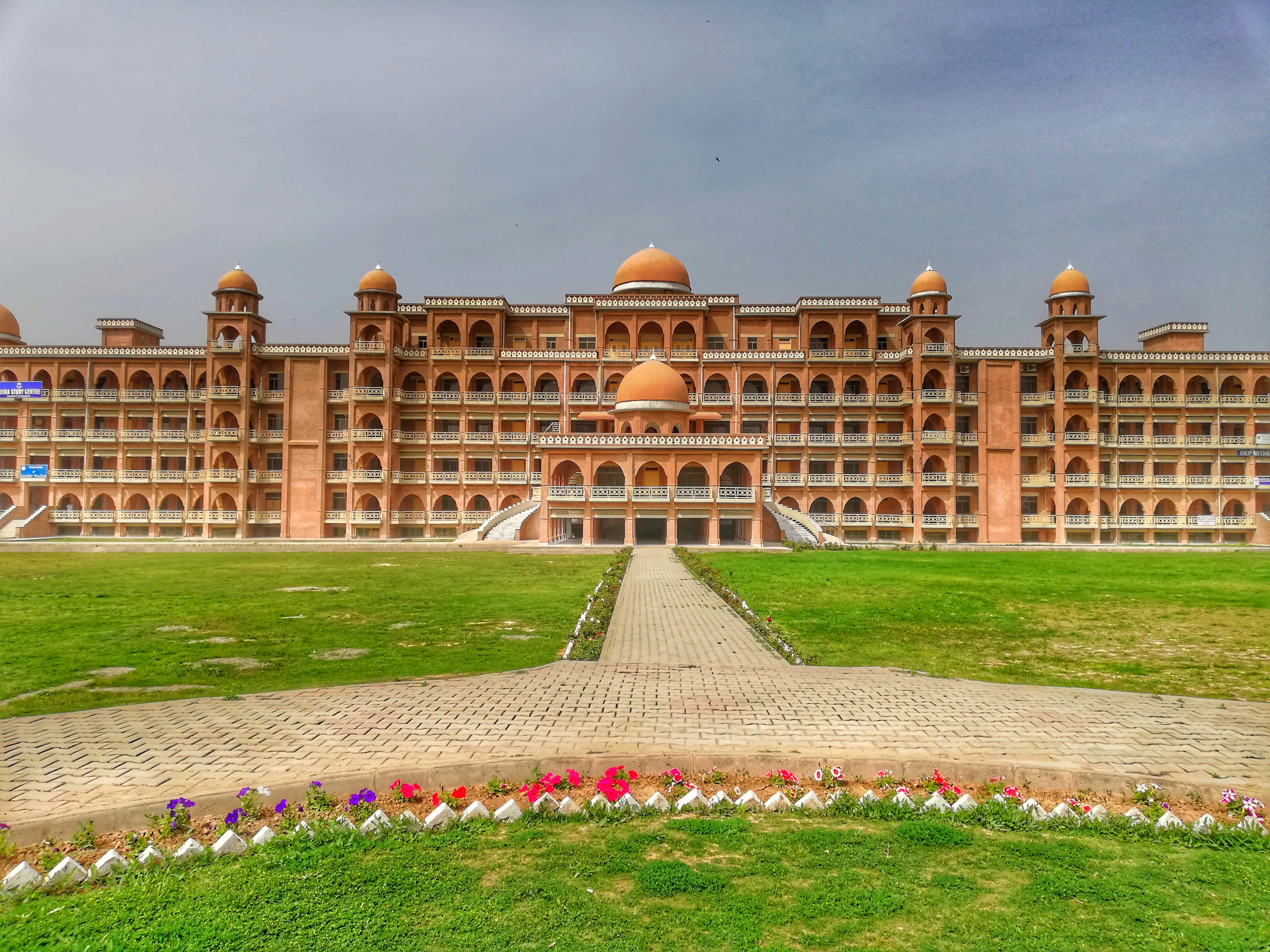
University of Peshawar

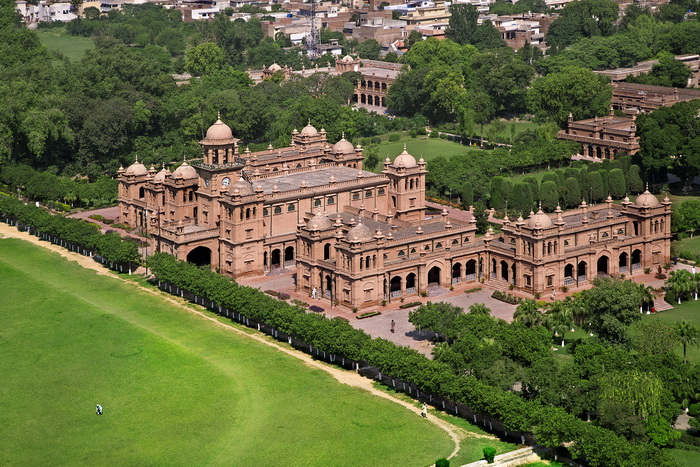
Islamia College University

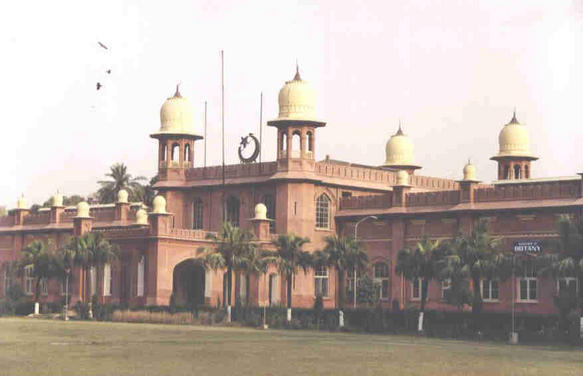
University of Agriculture, Faisalabad

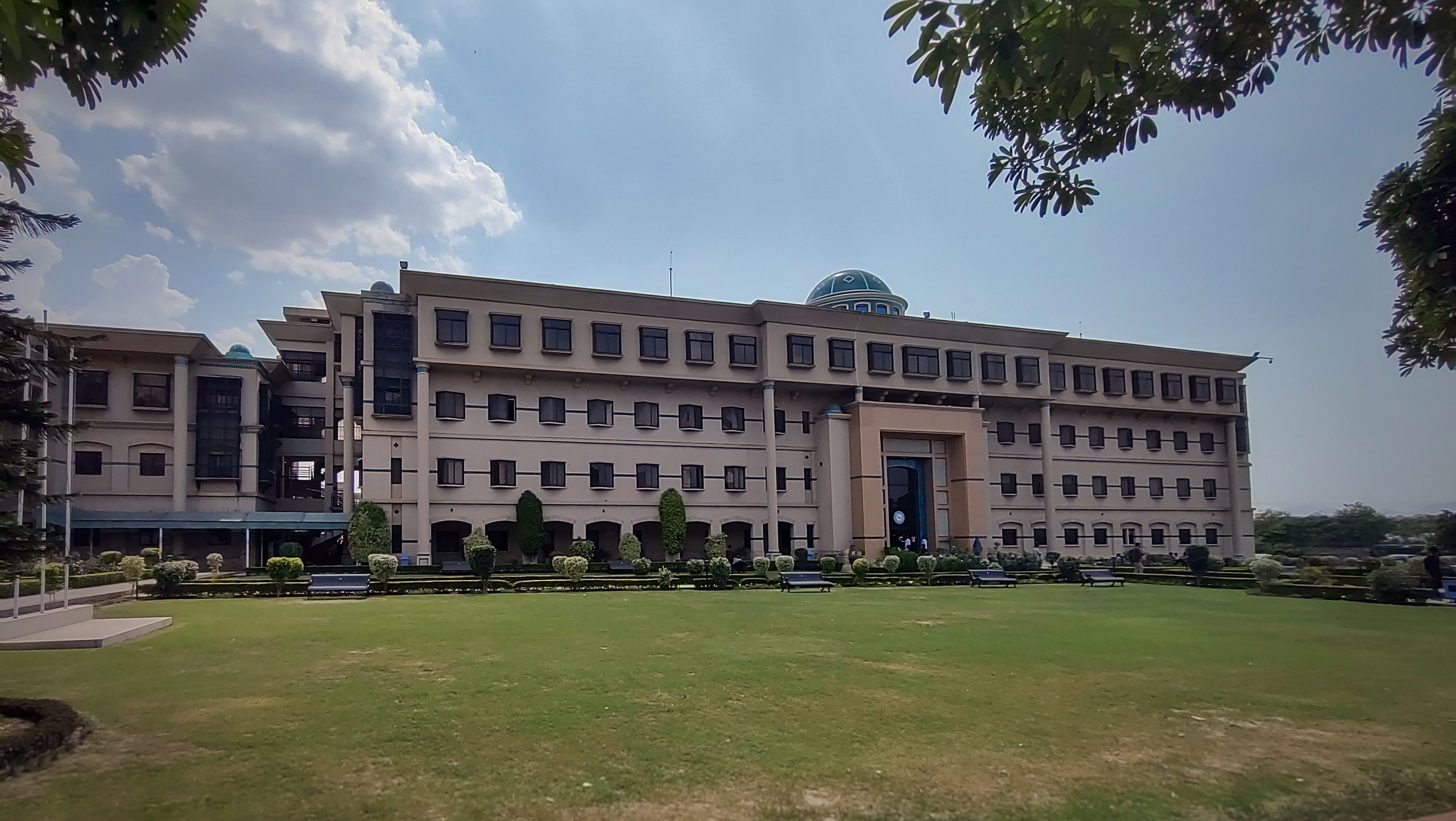
National University of Computer and Emerging Sciences

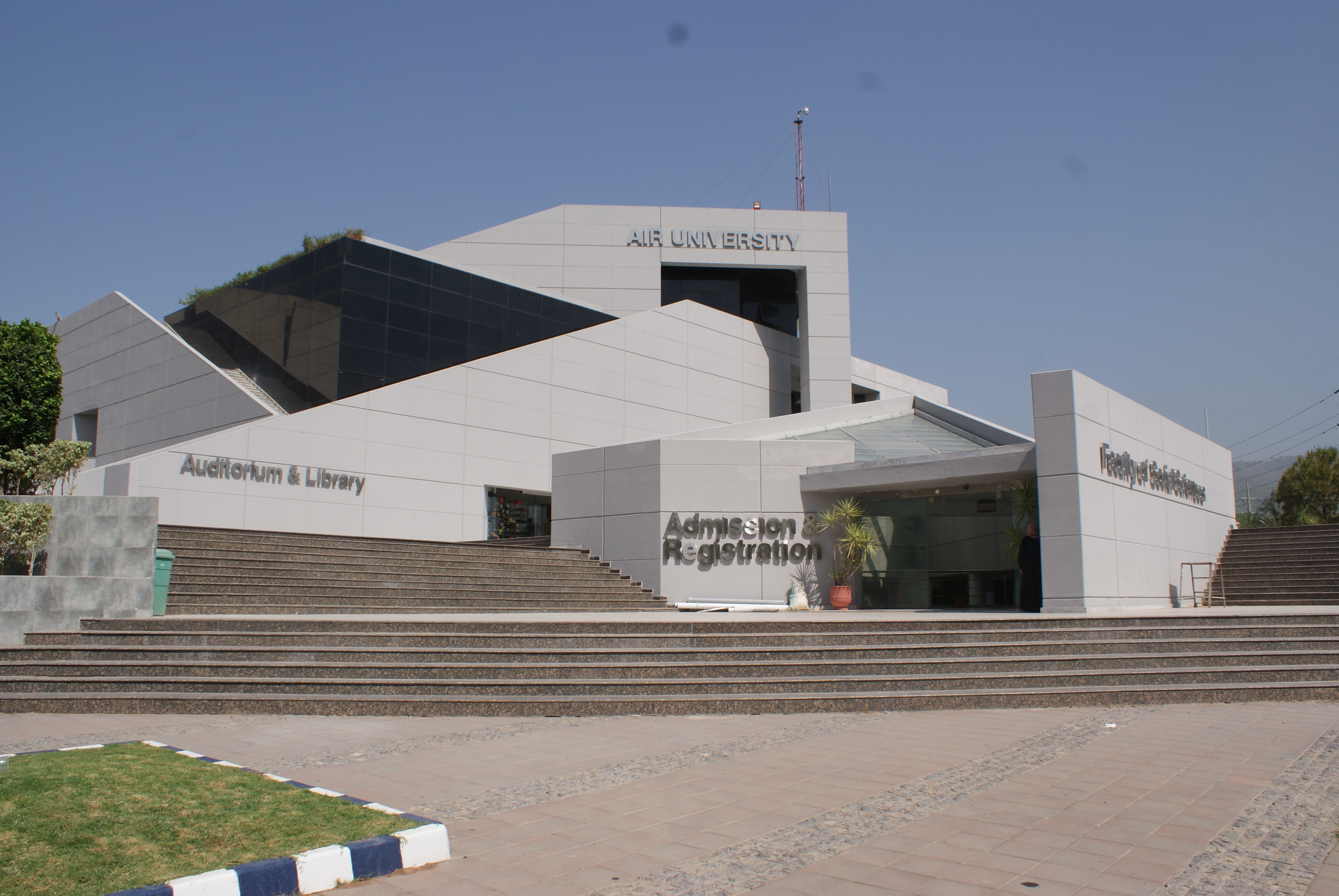
Air University Pakistan

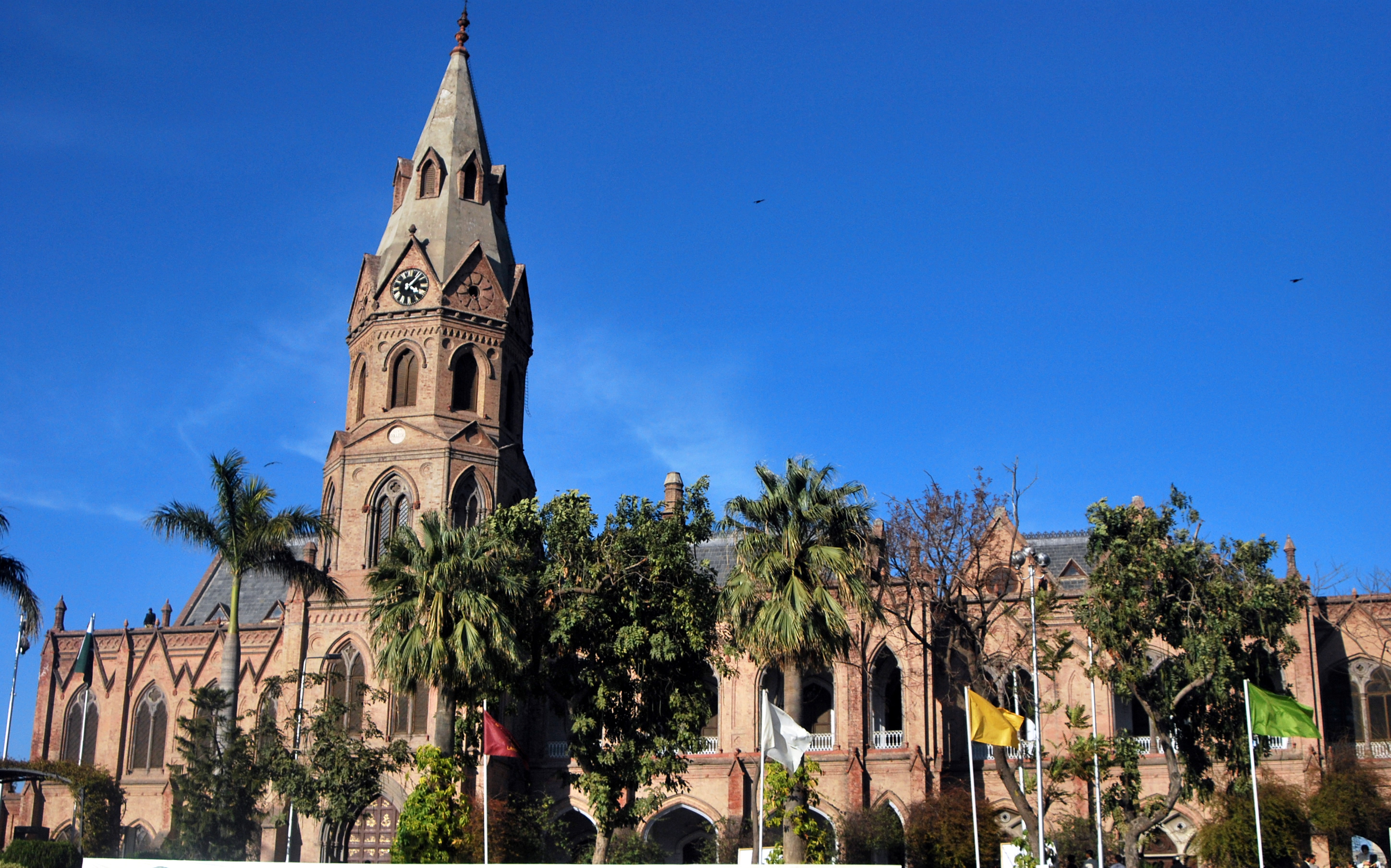
Government College University, Lahore

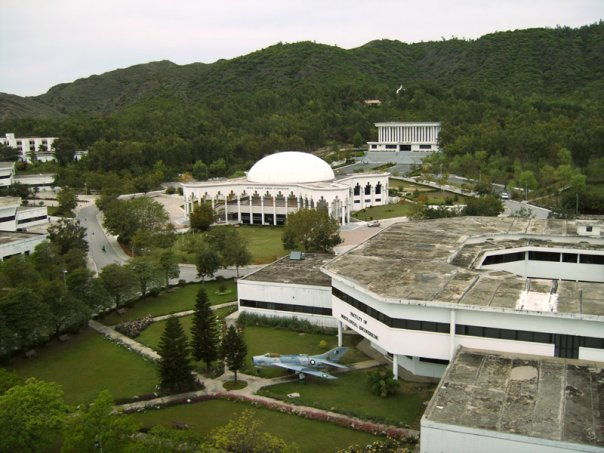
Ghulam Ishaq Khan Institute of Engineering Sciences and Technology

University of Gujrat

== See also ==
- Education in Pakistan
- Rankings of universities in Pakistan
- List of educational boards in Pakistan
- List of engineering universities and colleges in Pakistan
- List of Law schools in Pakistan
- List of computing schools in Pakistan
- List of business schools in Pakistan
- List of pharmacy schools in Pakistan
- List of medical schools in Pakistan
- Pakistan Academy of Sciences
- National Technology Council
