= List of business schools in Pakistan =

This is a list of business schools in Pakistan.

== Azad Kashmir ==
- Mirpur University of Science and Technology, Mirpur – BBA, MBA, BBF
- University of Management Sciences and Information Technology, Kotli – BBA, MBA

== Balochistan ==
- University of Balochistan, institute of Management Sciences, Quetta – BBA, MBA, MS, PHD
- Balochistan University of Information Technology, Engineering and Management Sciences, Quetta – BBA, MBA
- University of Turbat, Turbat – BBA, MBA

== Gilgit-Balitistan ==
- Karakoram International University, Gilgit and Skardu campuses – BBA, MBA

== Islamabad Capital Territory ==
- Air University School of Management Islamabad – BBA, MBA, PhD, BSAF
- Capital University of Science & Technology (CUST), Islamabad – BBA, MBA
- ComSATS Institute of Information Technology, Islamabad – BBA, MBA, MS, PhD
- Institute of Business and Leadership (IBL), Islamabad – ACCA, CFA, CMA, HND, PGD.
- Islamabad Business School (IBS), Islamabad – BBA, MBA, MS, PhD
- Foundation University, Islamabad – BBA, MBA
- Hamdard University, Islamabad – BBA, MBA
- International Islamic University, Islamabad – BBA, MBA
- Iqra University, Islamabad – BBA, MBA, MS, PhD
- MDi Business School (MDi), Islamabad – International BBA, MBA, Master of Project Management, Dual Masters (MBA + MPM)
- National University of Computer and Emerging Sciences (NUCES and FAST-NU), Islamabad – BBA, BS (Accounting and Finance), MBA
- National University of Modern Languages (NUML), Islamabad – BBA, MBA
- National University of Sciences and Technology (NUST), Islamabad – BBA, MBA
- Pakistan Institute of Development Economics, Islamabad – BBA, MBA
- Quaid-i-Azam School of Management Sciences, Quaid-i-Azam University, Islamabad – BBA, MBA, MPA, MPhil, PhD
- Riphah International University, Islamabad – BBA, MBA, MS
- School of Business and Management (SBM), Islamabad – CA, CIA, ACCA, ICMA, CIMA, PIPFA
- Shaheed Zulfiqar Ali Bhutto Institute of Science and Technology (SZABIST), Islamabad – BBA, MBA, MS, MSPM, PhD
- Shifa Tameer-e-Millat University, Islamabad – MBA
- University of Lahore, Islamabad – BBA, MBA

== Khyber Pakhtunkhwa ==
- Abasyn University, Peshawar – BBA
- Abbottabad University of Sciences & Technology – BBA, MBA, MPhil, BBS, MPA, B.Com M.Com, MS, PhD
- Abdul Wali Khan University Mardan – BBA, MBA, MPA
- CECOS University of Information Technology and Emerging Sciences, Peshawar – BBA, MBA
- ComSATS Institute of Information Technology, Abbottabad – BBA, MBA, MS, PhD
- Gandhara University, Peshawar – BBA, MBA
- Ghulam Ishaq Khan Institute of Engineering Sciences and Technology, Topi, Khyber Pakhtunkhwa – BS (Management Science)
- Hazara University, Mansehra – BBA, MBA, Mphil, BBS, MPA, B.Com M.Com, Ms, PhD
- Institute of Management Sciences, Peshawar – BBA, MBA, MS
- Qurtuba University, Dera Ismail Khan – BBA, MBA
- Sarhad University of Science and Information Technology, Peshawar – BBA, MBA
- Shaheed Benazir Bhutto Women University, Peshawar – BBA, MBA
- University of Haripur, Haripur – BBA, MBA
- University of Swat, Swat District – BBA, BBS, MBA
- University of Peshawar, Institute of Management Studies – BBA, MBA

== Punjab ==
- Institute of Business Management, University of Engineering and Technology, Lahore (UET) – BBA, MBA
- National Textile University, Faisalabad – BBA, MBA
- Faisalabad Business School (FBS), National Textile University, Faisalabad
- Bahauddin Zakariya University, Multan – BBA MBA MS PhD
- ComSATS Institute of Information Technology, Attock – BBA, MBA
- ComSATS Institute of Information Technology, Lahore – BBA, MBA
- ComSATS Institute of Information Technology, Wah – BBA, BBS, MBA, MS (Management Sciences), MS (Banking & Finance)
- FC College University, Lahore, Business School – BBA, MBA, EMBA
- GIFT University, Gujranwala – BBA, MBA
- Global Institute, Lahore – BBA, MBA
- Institute of Business Administration (IBA), University of the Punjab- BBA, MBA
- Hailey College of Banking & Finance, University of the Punjab, Lahore – BBA, MBA
- Hailey College of Commerce, University of the Punjab, Lahore – B.Com, M.Com, M.Phil., PhD
- Hajvery University, Lahore – BBA, MBA
- Imperial College of Business Studies, Lahore – BBA, MBA
- Institute of Administrative Sciences, University of the Punjab, Lahore – BS (Management), MPA
- Institute of Management Sciences, Lahore (Pak-AIMS) – BBA, MBA
- Lahore College for Women University, Lahore – BBA, B.Com
- Lahore School of Economics, Lahore – BBA, B.Sc, MBA
- Lahore University of Management Sciences
- National College of Business Administration and Economics – BBA, MBA
- National University of Computer and Emerging Sciences (NUCES and FAST-NU), Lahore – BBA, BS (Accounting and Finance), MBA
- Pir Mehr Ali Shah Arid Agriculture University, Rawalpindi – BBA, MBA
- The Superior College, Lahore – BBA, MBA
- University of Central Punjab, Lahore – BBA, MBA
- University of Education, Lahore – BBA
- University of Education Lahore (Multan Campus) – BBA
- University of Lahore, Lahore – BBA, MBA
- University of Management and Technology, Lahore – BBA, MBA, MS, PhD
- University of Sargodha, Sargodha – BBA, MBA
- University of South Asia, Lahore – BBA, MBA
- University of Veterinary and Animal Sciences, Lahore – BBA, MBA
- University of Wah, Wah Cantonment – BBA, MBA

== Sindh ==
- Institute of Business Management (IoBM), Karachi – BBA (Honors), BS (Honors), MBA, MS
- Institute of Business Administration (IBA), Karachi – BBA, MBA, MS Computer Sciences, BS Accounting and Finance, MS Economics
- DHA Suffa University, Karachi – BBA, MBA
- Dow University of Health Sciences, Karachi – MBA
- Greenwich University, Karachi – BBA, MBA
- Ilma University, Karachi – BBA, MBA
- Indus University, Karachi – BBA, MBA
- Iqra University (IU), Karachi – (Business University) BBA, MBA, BS Accounting and Finance, BS Islamic Banking and Finance, BS Economics and Finance, M.PHIL in Management Sciences, PhD in Management Sciences, BS in Management, Entrepreneurship, and Business Administration (MEBA)
- Isra University, Hyderabad, Sindh – BBA, MBA
- Jinnah University for Women, Karachi – BBA, MBA, EMBA
- Karachi Institute of Economics and Technology (PAF-KIET), Karachi – BBA, MBA
- Karachi School of Business & Leadership (KSBL), Karachi – MBA
- KASB Institute of Technology (KASBIT), Karachi – BBA, MBA
- Preston University, BBA, MBA
- Salim Habib University, Korangi Creek, Karachi – BBA, MBA
- Shah Abdul Latif University, Khairpur – BBA, MBA
- Shaheed Benazir Bhutto University, Shaheed Benazirabad – BBA, MBA
- Shaheed Zulfiqar Ali Bhutto Institute of Science and Technology (SZABIST), Karachi – BBA, MBA
- Sindh Madrasatul Islam, Karachi – BBA, MBA
- Sukkur Institute of Business Administration, Sukkur – BBA, MBA
- University of Karachi (UoK), Karachi – BBA, MBA
