= Education in Karachi =

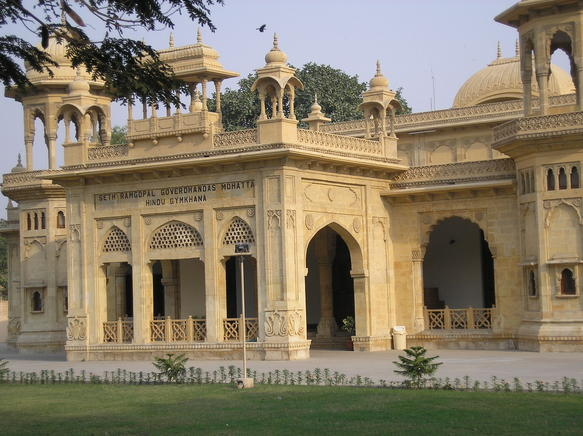
National Academy of Performing Arts

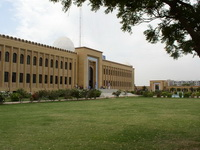
National University of Computer and Emerging Sciences

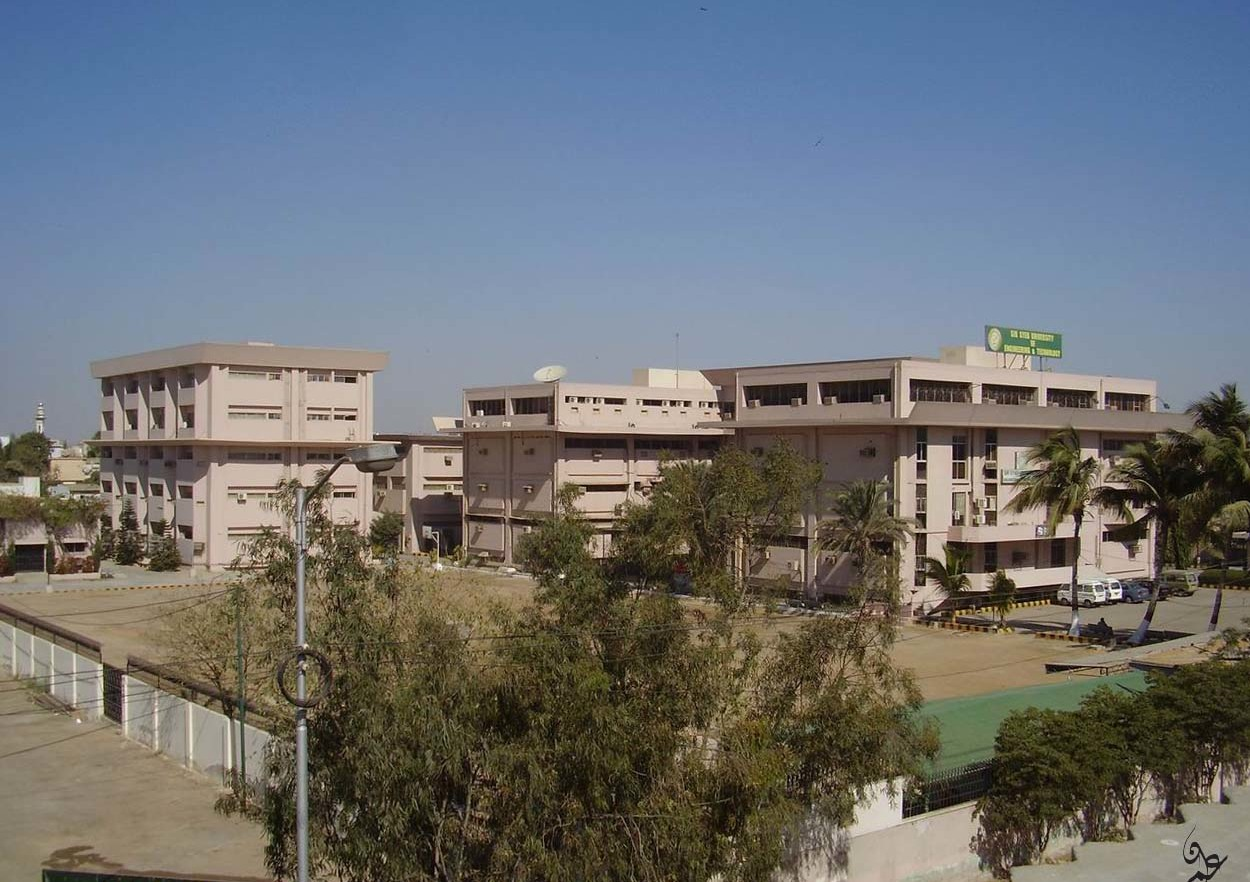
Sir Syed University of Engineering and Technology

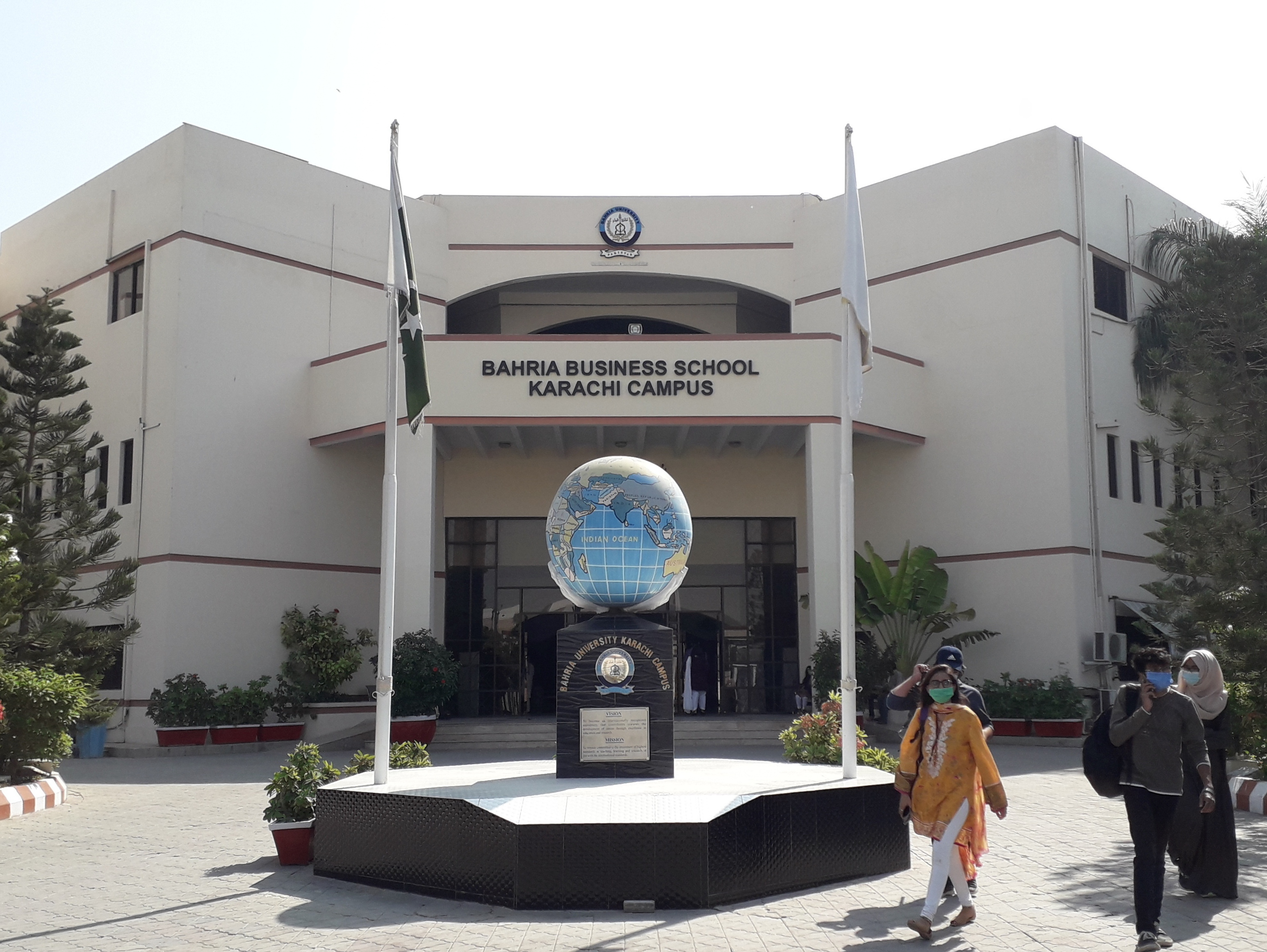
Bahria University

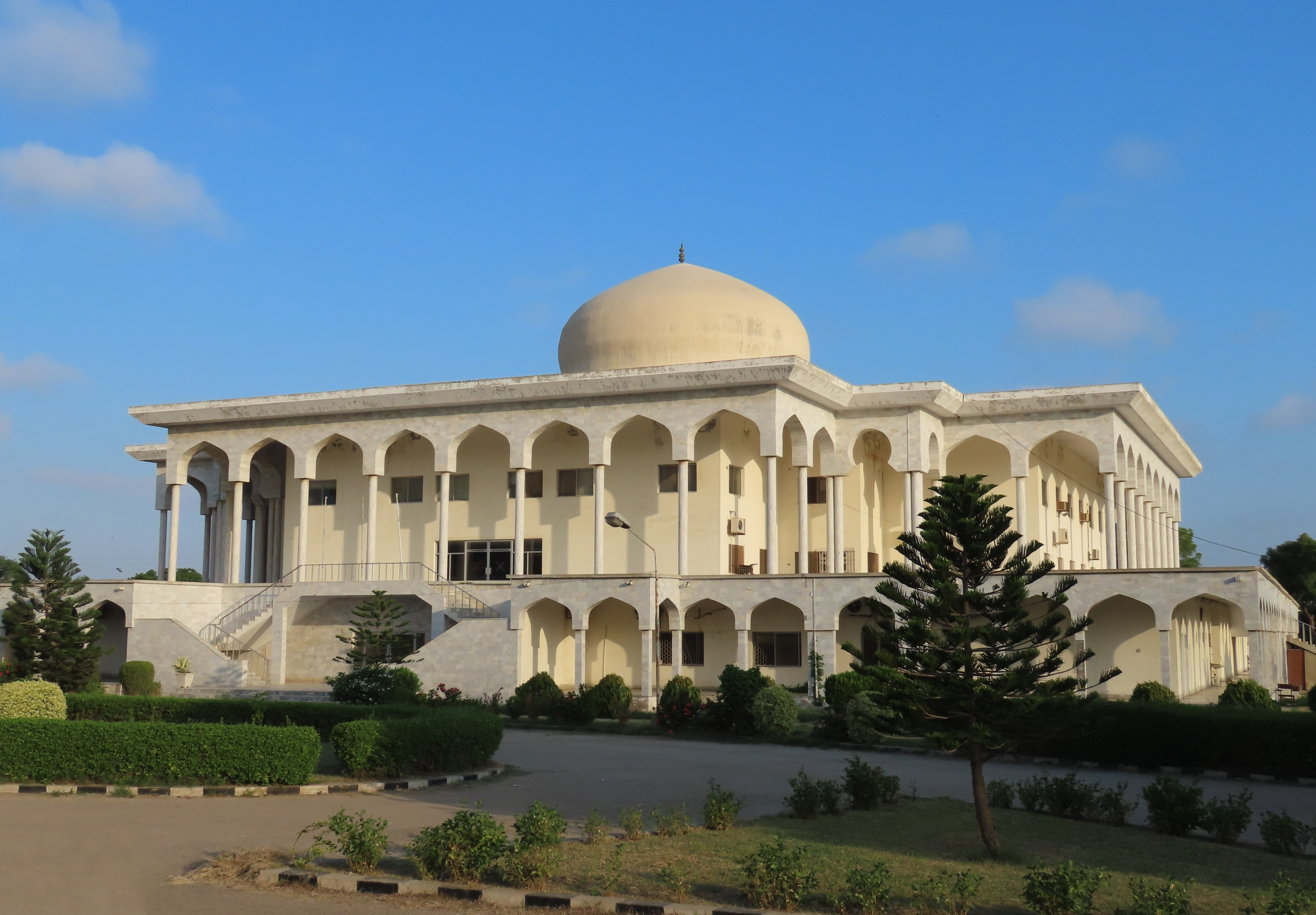
Sheikh Zayed Islamic Center

Karachi's educational system is divided into five levels: primary (grades one through five); middle (grades six through eight); high (grades nine and ten, leading to the Secondary School Certificate); intermediate (grades eleven and twelve, leading to a Higher Secondary School Certificate); and university programs at undergraduate and graduate level.

Karachi has both public and private educational institutions from primary to university level. Most educational institutions are gender based from primary to university level.

All academic education institutions are the responsibility of the provincial governments. The federal government mostly assists in curriculum development, accreditation and some financing of research.

== Districts Literacy Rate (10 Years and above) ==
According to the 2023 Census of Pakistan, Central is the most literate district among all the districts of Karachi and Sindh. Following is the literacy rate of the 10-years-old and above population of the seven districts of Karachi:

| Rank | District | Literate Population % (2023 census) | 2017 census | Increase/Decrease |
|---|---|---|---|---|
| 1 | Central | 83.55% | 81.52% | ↑ |
| 2 | Korangi | 79.86% | 80.49% | ↓ |
| 3 | South | 78.57% | 77.79% | ↑ |
| 4 | East | 80.07% | 75.96% | ↑ |
| 5 | West | 67.43% | 65.61% (including Kemari) | ↑ |
| 6 | Kemari | 62.07% | - | - |
| 7 | Malir | 63.14% | 63.69% | ↓ |

== Academic institutions ==
Education in Karachi is divided into five levels: primary (grades one through five); middle (grades six through eight); high (grades nine and ten, leading to the Secondary School Certificate); intermediate (grades eleven and twelve, leading to a Higher Secondary School Certificate); and university programmes leading to graduate and advanced degrees. Karachi has both public and private educational institutions. Most educational institutions are gender-based, from primary to university level.

Karachi Grammar School is the oldest school in Pakistan and has educated many Pakistani businessmen and politicians. The Narayan Jagannath High School in Karachi, which opened in 1855, was the first government school established in Sindh. Other well-known schools include the PakTurk International schools and colleges (formed by association of Turkey and Pakistan) Hamdard Public School, Civilizations Public School (Civi ), Education Bay [EBay] school located in Karachi (for higher education) Army Public School (C.O.D.), Karachi Public school, British Overseas School, L'ecole for Advanced Studies, Bay View Academy, the CAS School, Generation's School, Karachi American School, Aga Khan Higher Secondary School, the Froebel Education Centre (FEC), The Paradise School and College, Grand Folk's English School, Cordoba School for A Levels (founded in 1902 by RJK), Habib Public School, AL-Murtaza School Mama Parsi Girls Secondary School, B. V. S. Parsi High School, Civilizations Public School, The Oasys School, Avicenna School, The Lyceum School, Ladybird Grammar School, The City School, Azeemi Public Hiegher Secondary School, ABC Public School, Beaconhouse School System, The Educators schools, Sultan Mohamed Shah Aga Khan School, Shahwilayat Public School, Springfield School, St Patrick's High School, St Paul's English High School, St Joseph's Convent School, St Jude's High School, St Michael's Convent School, Foundation Public School, Aziz Academy, Aisha Bawany Academy, Karachi Gems School, Aga Khan School Kharadar, St Peter's High School, White House Grammar School Chiniot Islamia School, and St. Jude's High School.White House Grammar School is chaired by Principal Nuzhat Yazdani. She is the founder and current principal of White House Grammar School. In the early 1990s, White House Grammar School was successful in getting the top three positions in secondary school examinations organised by the Karachi Board of Education for several years.

At the intermediate level or in Secondary education, there are many colleges in Karachi. In Karachi, colleges can be classified as science colleges, commerce colleges and arts colleges. In the category of science colleges Adamjee Government Science College is an intermediate boys college. The college accepts students at the secondary level in two fields: pre-engineering and pre-medical.

The University of Karachi, known as KU, is Pakistan's largest university, with a student population of 24,000 and one of the largest faculties in the world. It is located next to the NED University of Engineering and Technology, the country's oldest engineering institute. NED University stands for Nadirshaw Edulji Dinshaw University of Engineering and Technology. The current name was given to this institution after receiving a huge donation of "Rs. 150,000 " from Mr Nadirshaw Edulji Dinshaw. Before this the name of this institution was "Prince of Wales Engineering College". At the moment the university has seven faculties and imparts education in 25 different engineering technologies. NED University is the only university in Karachi which has such a huge infrastructure and fully developed laboratory facilities in all 25 engineering technologies. It is very important to mention the name of Engr.Abul Kalam who completely transformed N.E.D University. Engr Abul Kalam joined the N.E.D University in 1996 as a vice-chancellor and served 16 precious years as head of the institute. Under his supervision N.E.D. University successfully launched 25 new departments. Previously N.E.D had only 6 departments. Engr. Abul Kalam emphasized on discipline in education, and he inculcated the importance of strict discipline in teaching staff as well as in students.

Textile Institute of Pakistan (TIP) is a private university which was established in 1994 with the co-operation of the All Pakistan Textile Mills Association (APTMA).

In the private sector, the National University of Computer and Emerging Sciences (NUCES-FAST), one of Pakistan's top universities in computer education, operates two campuses in Karachi. Sir Syed University of Engineering and Technology (SSUET) provides training in biomedical engineering, civil engineering, electronics engineering, telecom engineering and computer engineering. Dawood University of Engineering and Technology, which opened in 1962, offers degree programmes in petroleum & gas engineering, energy and environment engineering, telecommunication engineering, computer system engineering, electronic engineering, chemical engineering, industrial engineering, materials engineering and architecture. Karachi Institute of Economics & Technology (KIET) has two campuses in Karachi.

The Plastics Technology Center (PTC), located in Karachi's Korangi Industrial Area, is Pakistan's only educational institution providing training in the field of polymer engineering and plastics testing services. The Institute of Business Administration (IBA), founded in 1955, is the oldest business school outside of North America. The Shaheed Zulfiqar Ali Bhutto Institute of Science and Technology (SZABIST), founded in 1995 by Benazir Bhutto, is located in Karachi, with its other campuses in Islamabad, Larkana and Dubai. Pakistan Navy Engineering College (PNEC) is a part of the National University of Sciences and Technology (NUST), offering engineering programmes, including electrical engineering and mechanical engineering.

Pakistan Marine Academy (PMA), founded in 1962, is the only institution of its kind in the public sector training Merchant Navy Cadets with a degree in Marine Engineering and in Ship Management. Hamdard University is the largest private university in Pakistan, with faculties including Eastern Medicine, Medical, Engineering, Pharmacy, and Law. It has one of Pakistan's largest libraries, Bait al Hikmat. Jinnah University for Women is the first women's university in Pakistan. Karachi is home to the head offices of the Institute of Chartered Accountants of Pakistan (ICAP) (established in 1961) and the Institute of Cost and Management Accountants of Pakistan (ICMAP). Among the many other institutions providing business education are Greenwich University, Iqra University (IU), Institute of Business Management (IoBM), SZABIST, and the Institute of Business and Technology. Leading medical schools of Pakistan like the Dow University of Health Sciences and the Aga Khan University are situated in Karachi. PLANWEL has a CISCO Network Academy as well as iCBT centre for ETS Prometric and Pearsons VUE.

Bahria University has a purpose-built campus in Karachi. Mohammad Ali Jinnah University (MAJU) is a private university in Pakistan. The main campus is in Karachi; the other campus is in Islamabad. The College of Accounting and Management Sciences (CAMS) also has three branches in the city. Sindh Muslim Govt. Science College, located at Saddar Town, is the oldest college in Karachi. Hamdard University is an accredited private research university with multiple campuses in Karachi and Islamabad, Pakistan.

Darul 'Uloom Karachi is among the Islamic schools in Karachi.

== Early education ==
A child may begin his/her schooling at a pre-school at the age of 3. Over the last few years, many new kindergarten (sometimes called montessori) schools have also sprung up in Karachi. Usually pre-school Muslim children get Islamic education of Quran and Hadis at home or local Masjid or Madrasahs.

== Tertiary and quaternary education ==
Most universities of Karachi are considered to be amongst the premier educational institutions of Pakistan. For 2004–05, the city's literacy rate was estimated at 65.26%, 4th Highest in Pakistan after Lahore, Islamabad & Rawalpindi, with a GER of 111%, highest in Sindh.

== See also ==
- List of schools in Karachi
- List of colleges in Karachi
- List of universities in Karachi
