= Asad Ali Memon =

Pakistani mountaineer

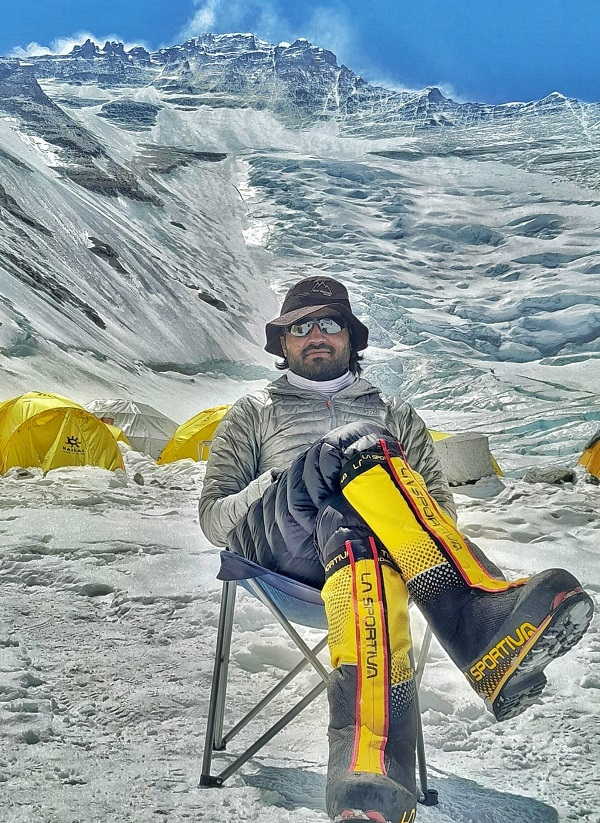
- Born: 1997 (age 28–29); Larkana, Sindh
- Education: Institute of Business Management, Karachi
- Occupation: Mountaineer

Asad Ali Memon (born 1997) is a Pakistani mountaineer.

== Early life and education ==
Asad Ali Memon was born in 1997 in Larkana, Sindh, Pakistan. He completed his matriculation at Larkana Public School and later earned a bachelor's degree in computer science from the Institute of Business Management (IoBM) in Karachi.

== Mountaineering expeditions ==
In February 2021, Memon climbed Mount Kilimanjaro in under 20 hours, reportedly becoming the first Pakistani to achieve this feat.

In August 2019, Memon summited Mount Elbrus, the highest peak in Europe at 5,642 meters.

Memon summited Mount Aconcagua, the highest peak in South America, on January 26, 2020.

In May 2022, Memon successfully summited Denali, the highest peak in North America at 6,190 meters.

On May 21, 2023, Memon became the first climber from Sindh to summit Mount Everest, reaching the peak at 8,848 meters.

In 2023, Memon climbed Spantik (Golden Peak), which stands at 7,027 meters in the Karakoram Range.
