= UMPK =

UMPK may refer to:

- UMP kinase, an enzyme
- UMPK (bomb kit), a Russian munition guidance kit
- University of Mirpurkhas or UMPK, a public research university in Pakistan
