= Pirzada Qasim =

Pakistani scholar, poet, scientist and educationist

Pirzada Qasim Raza Siddiqui پیرزادہ قاسم
- Born: 8 February 1943 (age 83); Delhi, British India
- Education: University of Newcastle Upon Tyne, United Kingdom
- Known for: Literary work in Urdu language
- Scientific career
- Fields: Neuroscience
- Workplaces: University of Karachi; Federal Urdu University; Nazeer Hussain University; Ziauddin University; Laboratories of Lord Walton of Detachant

Pirzada Qasim Raza Siddiqui (Urdu: پیرزادہ قاسم رضا صدیقی; born 8 February 1943) is a Pakistani scholar, author, poet, scientist and educationist. He has served as vice chancellor of several universities.

== Early life and career ==
Pirzada was born on 8 February 1943 to an Urdu-speaking family in Delhi, British India. After the Partition of India in 1947, he continued his studies in Pakistan and received his college degrees from D J Science College in Karachi and BSc (H) from University of Karachi. He earned his PhD degree at Newcastle University, England.

Pirzada Qasim started his career as a lecturer at the University of Karachi and eventually became a professor. He has been associated with the university's Department of Physiology since 1960. He also served as Vice-Chancellor at the Federal Urdu University, University of Karachi and Ziauddin University. He has also served as the Chancellor of Nazeer Hussain University. He has written several books in English and Urdu, including Urdu poetry.
