= Federation of All Pakistan Universities Academic Staff Association =

Pakistani staff association

- Type: Association
- Location: Pakistan

Federation of All Pakistan Universities Academic Staff Association also known as FAPUASA is an association of the universities academic staff all over Pakistan.
