= University of Jhang =

University in Punjab, Pakistan

- جامعہ جھنگ
- Type: Public
- Academic affiliations: Punjab Higher Education Commission
- Location: Jhang, Punjab, Pakistan
- Website: uoj.edu.pk

The University of Jhang (UOJ) (Urdu: جامعہ جھنگ) (informally Jhang University) is a public university located in Jhang, Punjab, Pakistan.

== History ==
In 2015, the Punjab Assembly passed the University of Jhang Act (XXV of 2015). A letter was issued by the Higher Education Department (Punjab) to the Governor of Punjab for approval and establishing the University of Jhang with minimum of 200 acres land for this project.

== Recognized university ==
University of Jhang is recognized by the Higher Education Commission of Pakistan.
