= Kohsar University Murree =

Public university in Murree, Punjab

Coordinates: 33.9158°N 73.4062°E

- کوہسار یونیورسٹی مری
- Type: Public
- Established: 2020
- Affiliations: HEC
- Academic affiliations: HEC, PHEC
- Chancellor: Governor of Punjab
- Vice-Chancellor: Prof. Dr. Rafia Mumtaz
- Location: Admin Block, Kashmir Point Murree, Punjab, 47200, Pakistan
- Campus: Urban
- Officer in charge (GPO Chowk Campus)): Ms. Saima Ali (GPO Chowk Campus))
- Officer in charge (Jhika Gali Campus): Mr. Sabeer Ahmed
- Nickname: KUM
- Website: kum.edu.pk

Kohsar University Murree (Urdu: کوہسار یونیورسٹی مری; commonly referred to as KUM), is a public university located in Murree, Punjab, Pakistan. It was established by Government of Punjab vide Kohsar University, Murree Act-2020.

The university is currently based in the buildings of Govt. Graduate College Murree (Boys), Govt. Graduate College for Women Murree, Punjab House Murree, Resource Centre Murree and in Murree Brewery.

Kohsar University Murree currently offers undergraduate, graduate, and postgraduate programs in various fields including Business Administration, Computer Science, Education, and Social Sciences. The academic year is divided into two semesters, with each semester lasting for approximately 16 weeks.

== Faculties and departments ==
Kohsar University currently offers admissions in following departments:

- Department of Botany
- Department of English
- Department of Mathematics
- Department of Political Science
- Department of Psychology
- Department of Sociology
- Department of Statistics
- Department of Urdu
