= National Business Education Accreditation Council =

Pakistani organisation

- شورای قومی اعتباردهی تعلیم تجارت
- Type: Governmental organization, Educational accreditation
- Headquarters: Islamabad, Pakistan
- Parent organization: Higher Education Commission (Pakistan)
- Website: nbeac.org.pk

The National Business Education Accreditation Council (NBEAC) is an accreditation body under the administrative control of Higher Education Commission (Pakistan). NBEAC accredits Business Administration, Public Administration and Management Sciences degree programs of Pakistan's educational institutes.

NBEAC functions at the national level as an accreditation authority within its scope to facilitate enhancing the quality of business education in Pakistan. Since its inception, it has created systems, procedures, networks and programs to ensure that all degree-awarding institutions in Pakistan achieve standards that are comparable with global standards and thus gain NBEAC accreditation. In the future, this accreditation could be used as a mechanism to introduce business school rankings to encourage competitiveness, quality, continuous improvement and sustainability in the Pakistani business education market.

NBEAC accreditation acts both as a status and a process. Accreditation status provides public notification that the accredited program meets the high standards of quality set forth by the NBEAC. As a process, accreditation reflects the fact that in achieving recognition by NBEAC, the institution and the program are committed to not only meet standards but to continuously seek ways to enhance the quality of education in that program. Programmatic accreditation is an independent peer review process that validates that established standards of excellence set by the NBEAC are well met. NBEAC has designed these standards to assure that the graduates receive the quality of education in that program necessary for success in industry.

== See also ==
- List of business schools in Pakistan
