= Al-Hamd Islamic University =

University in Quetta, Pakistan

- Motto in English: We Change Lives
- Type: Private
- Established: 2005
- Affiliations: HEC
- President: Shakeel Ahmed Roshan
- Location: Quetta, Balochistan, Pakistan
- Campus: Islamabad
- Website: www.aiu.edu.pk

Al-Hamd Islamic University is a private university located in the downtown area of Quetta, Balochistan, Pakistan. The Al-Hamd Islamic University is recognized by Higher Education Commission of Pakistan and it is conceived by Alhamd Educational System (AES). The Alhamd Educational System which was established in 1995 is also operating some other institution like: Balochistan Institute of Technology, BIT Girls College, Dar-e-Arqam School of Islam and Modern Sciences, Dar-e-Arqam Girls College, and Quran Research Academy. The university was established in 2005 under the act of The Al-Hamd Islamic University, Quetta. Act 2005 by Balochistan Assembly.

== Departments ==
- Department of Civil Engineering Technology
- Department of Electronics
- Department of Social Sciences
- Department of Education
- Department of Commerce
- Department of Management Sciences
- Department of Computer Sciences
- Department of Islamic Studies
- Department of Nursing and Allied Medical Sciences

== See also ==
- [[List of universities in Pakistdfdfdf

an]]
