= University of Loralai =

University in Loralai, Pakistan

- لورالايي پوهنتون
- Motto: Access, Quality & Relevance
- Type: Public sector university
- Established: 2012 (functioned as sub-campus of University of Balochistan from 2009 to 2012)
- Academic affiliations: Higher Education Commission of Pakistan
- Chancellor: Governor of Balochistan
- Vice-Chancellor: Engr. Prof. Dr. Ehsanullah Khan Kakar
- Students: 1,000+
- Location: Loralai-84800, Balochistan, Pakistan
- Campus: 560 acres (230 ha)
- Nickname: UoL
- Website: www.uoli.edu.pk

University of Loralai (Pashto: لورالايي پوهنتون) is in Loralai, Pakistan. The university started its academic activities in 2012.

== History ==
The university was established in 2009 as a sub-campus of the University of Balochistan (UOB) Quetta. For this purpose, 500 acres of land at Zarr Karerz was provided by the Provincial Government which allocated 12 km from Loralai City at Quetta Road. The tentative proposal of the university was approved in the ECNEC meeting held in May 2011, allocation of Rs. 1518.751 million allocated by the HEC as per PC-1.

It was initially run under UoB administration for almost four years.

Later on, it was declared a full-fledged university with the promulgation of the University of Loralai Act No.VI of 2012, passed by the Provincial Assembly of Balochistan on 24 September 2012 and assented to by Governor, Balochistan on 27 September 2012.

Prof. Dr. Abdullah Khan Kakar was appointed as first Vice Chancellor of the university on 19 December 2014 while Mr. Noor ul Amin kakar was appointed as first Register on 25 December 2024. He had a good experience in the field of Higher Education Sector.

== Programs and departments ==
- BS(CS) Computer Science Dept. 4 years (8 semesters)
- MCS Computer Science Dept. 2 years (4 semesters)
- BBA Management Science Dept. 4 years (8 semesters)
- BBS Management Science Dept. 2 years (4 semesters)
- B.Com. Commerce Dept. 2 years (4 semesters)
- M.Com. Commerce Dept. 2 years (4 semesters)
- B.Ed. Education Dept. 4 years (8 semesters)
- B.Ed. Education Dept. 2.5 years (5 semesters)
- B.Ed. Education Dept. 2 years (4 semesters)
- B.Ed. Education Dept. 1.5 years (3 semesters)
- M.Ed. Education Dept. 1 year (annual system)
- BS Mathematics Dept. 4 year
- BS English department. 4 year
- B.Ed English department 2.5 year
- BS pashtoo department 4 years
- B.Ed pashtoo department 2.5 year
