= Punjab House, Murree =

- Interactive map of the Punjab House, Murree area

General information
- Coordinates: 33°53′51″N 73°22′50″E
- Construction started: 1937; 89 years ago
- Owner: Government of Punjab

Technical details
- Floor count: 3
- Floor area: 8.75 acres (3.54 ha)

Other information
- Number of rooms: 20

Punjab House, formerly known as Circuit House, is a mansion and resort building in Murree, near Rawalpindi-Islamabad, Pakistan. It has been used by the Government of Punjab and Government of Pakistan for Chief Minister's annexe, for government official meetings, as banquet hall, and as state guest house.

== History ==
Punjab House was founded in 1937 as Circuit House. It was further developed when Manzoor Wattoo was chief minister of Punjab.

In 2003, it was renamed as Punjab House.

In 2019, it was announced that Punjab House would be converted into a university.

== Building ==
Punjab House has three floors. The top floor is the VVIP floor with master bedroom and suite, the second floor has four executive suites, and the ground floor has a reception hall, two bedrooms and a large waiting lounge.

It has six executive suites overall and a VVIP floor with a master bedroom and suite spread over 10,000 sq ft (930 m^{2}). The master suite has drawing room, walk-in closet, luxury bathroom, balcony and a big kitchen. The foyer of the annexe has most expensive chandelier and the furniture has been provided by top designers in Pakistan. It is centrally air conditioned. It has approximately 100 employees.
