= Lahore Garrison University =

Army university in Punjab, Pakistan

- Other name: LGU
- Motto: Nurturing the Future of Pakistan in an Excellent Environment.
- Type: Private
- Established: 2010; 16 years ago
- Affiliations: NCEAC; HEC
- Chancellor: Governor of Punjab
- Vice-Chancellor: Maj Gen Muhammad Khalil Dar, HI(M) (Retd)
- Registrar: Brig Adnan Ahmed Khan, SI(M), (Retd)
- Academic staff: 300+
- Students: 12000+
- Location: Lahore, Punjab, Pakistan; 31.463978620067614°N 74.44269426851181°E
- Campus: Urban
- Colors: Blue, White & Green,
- Website: lgu.edu.pk

The Lahore Garrison University (LGU) is a private university located in Lahore, Punjab, Pakistan. The university was established by the Pakistan Army. It runs undergraduates and graduate and PhD programs in various disciplines. Alumni and students are known as Garrisonians.

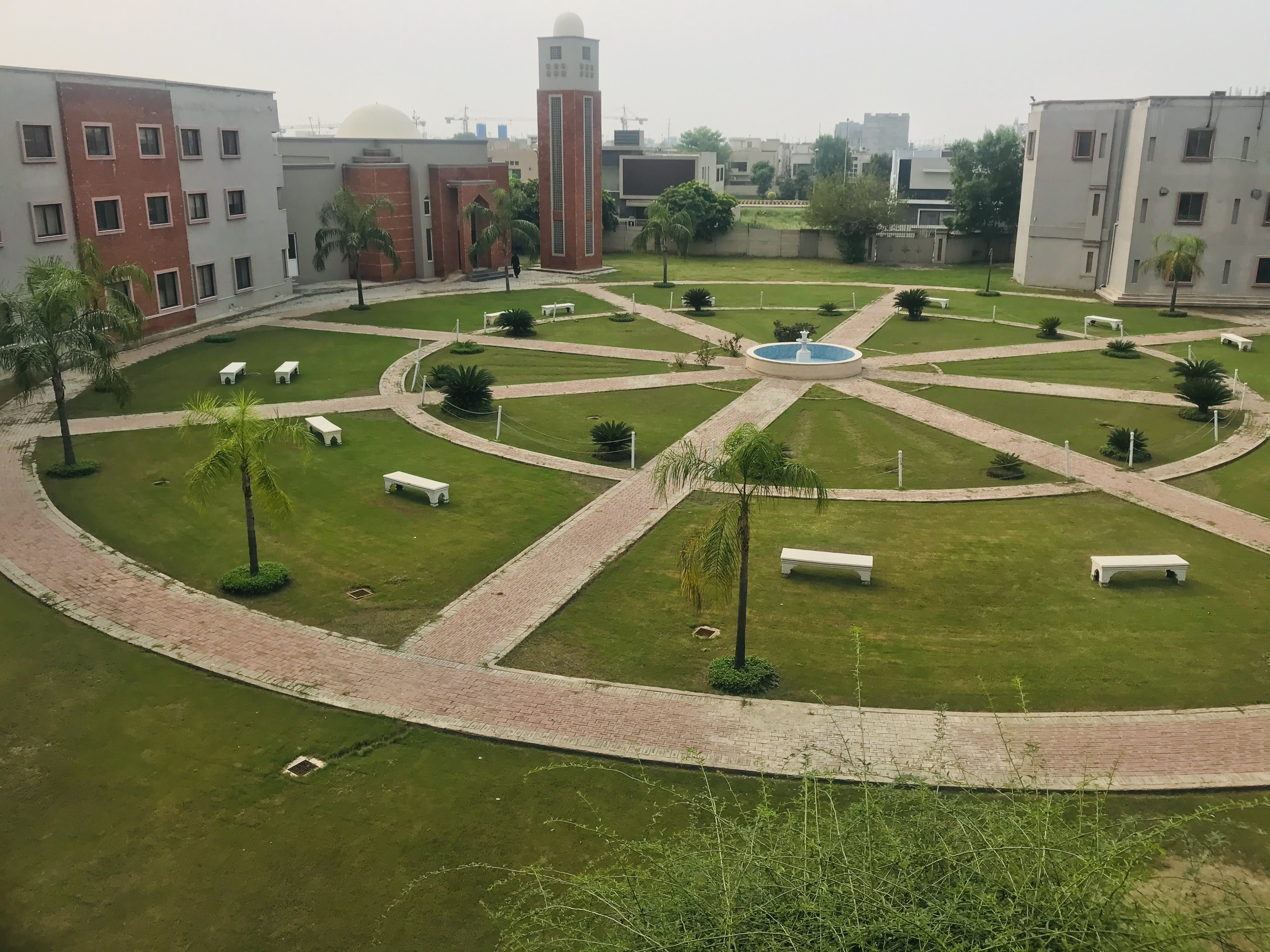
The Fountain Ground of Lahore Garrison University

== Research ==
LGU established a Digital Forensics Research Center that is the first of its kind in Pakistan. The lab will be able to address all the cyber security needs of Pakistan. It will also provide the training to professionals.

LGU published seven approved research journals in different fields.

== Departments ==
Lahore Garrison University has fifteen departments under the main faculties of Social Sciences, Computer Sciences, Languages, Basic Sciences.

=== Faculty of Social Sciences ===
1. Department of Psychology

2. Department of Management Sciences

3. Department of Criminology and Forensic Sciences

4. Department of Islamic Sciences

5. Department of Mass Communication

6. Department of International Relations and Political Sciences

=== Faculty of Computer Sciences ===
1. Department of Computer Sciences

2. Department of Software Engineering

3. Department of Information Technology

=== Faculty of Languages ===
1. Department of English Language and Literature

2. Department of Urdu

=== Faculty of Basic Sciences ===
1. Department Biology

2. Department of Physics

3. Department of Chemistry

4. Department of Mathematics

== See also ==
- List of universities in Pakistan
