= Khadim Ali Shah Bukhari Institute of Technology =

Institute of higher education in Karachi, Pakistan

KASB Institute of Technology
- دانش کدہَ خادم علی شاہ بخاری برائے فنونِ تیکنیکی
- Motto: 'We prepare future leaders who lead by setting exemplary examples'
- Type: Private
- Established: 1999
- Affiliations: HEC,
- Chancellor: Arif Ali Shah Bukhari
- Dean: Dr. Abdul Kabeer Kazi
- Location: Karachi, Sindh, Pakistan
- Website: www.kasbit.edu.pk

Khadim Ali Shah Bukhari Institute of Technology (Urdu: دانش کدہَ خادم علی شاہ بخاری برائے فنونِ تیکنیکی) (Sindhi: خادم علي شاه بخاري انسٽيٽيوٽ آف تيڪنالاجي) (KASB Institute of Technology, KASBIT) is a private degree-awarding institution in Karachi, Pakistan. It was established in September 1999, through registration with Securities and Exchange Commission of Pakistan, Government of Pakistan. It is the first private sector institute of higher education that was registered as a corporate body.

== Prospect ==
To produce graduates and post-graduates to cater to the requirements of the market for socioeconomic development of the country.

== Faculties and departments ==
- Department of Business Administration
- Department of Commerce
- Department of English

== See also ==
- Lahore Garrison University
- Information Technology University
- Universities in Pakistan
