= Greenwich University, Karachi =

Research university in Pakistan

Coordinates: 24.7877907°N 67.0483606°E

Greenwich University
- گرین وچ یونیورسٹی کراچی
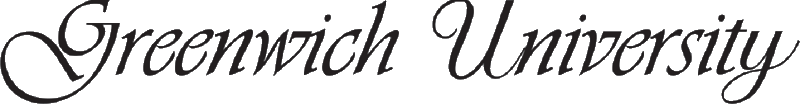
- Greenwich University Logo
- Other name: GU
- Former name: Greenwich Institute
- Motto: Labor Omnia Vincit
- Motto in English: Work conquers all
- Type: Private
- Established: April 1987
- Accreditation: HEC
- Academic affiliations: APQN NAFSA INQAAHE AACSB IAU
- Chancellor: Seema Mughal
- Vice-Chancellor: Seema Mughal
- Provost: Naveed Ahmed Mughal
- Dean: Dr AQ Mughal
- Director: Saeed Kamal Mughal
- Students: ~3,000
- Undergraduates: ~2,000
- Postgraduates: ~1,000
- Doctoral students: ~10
- Location: Karachi, Sindh, Pakistan
- Campus: Residential
- Colours: White, pink, aero
- Website: greenwich.edu.pk
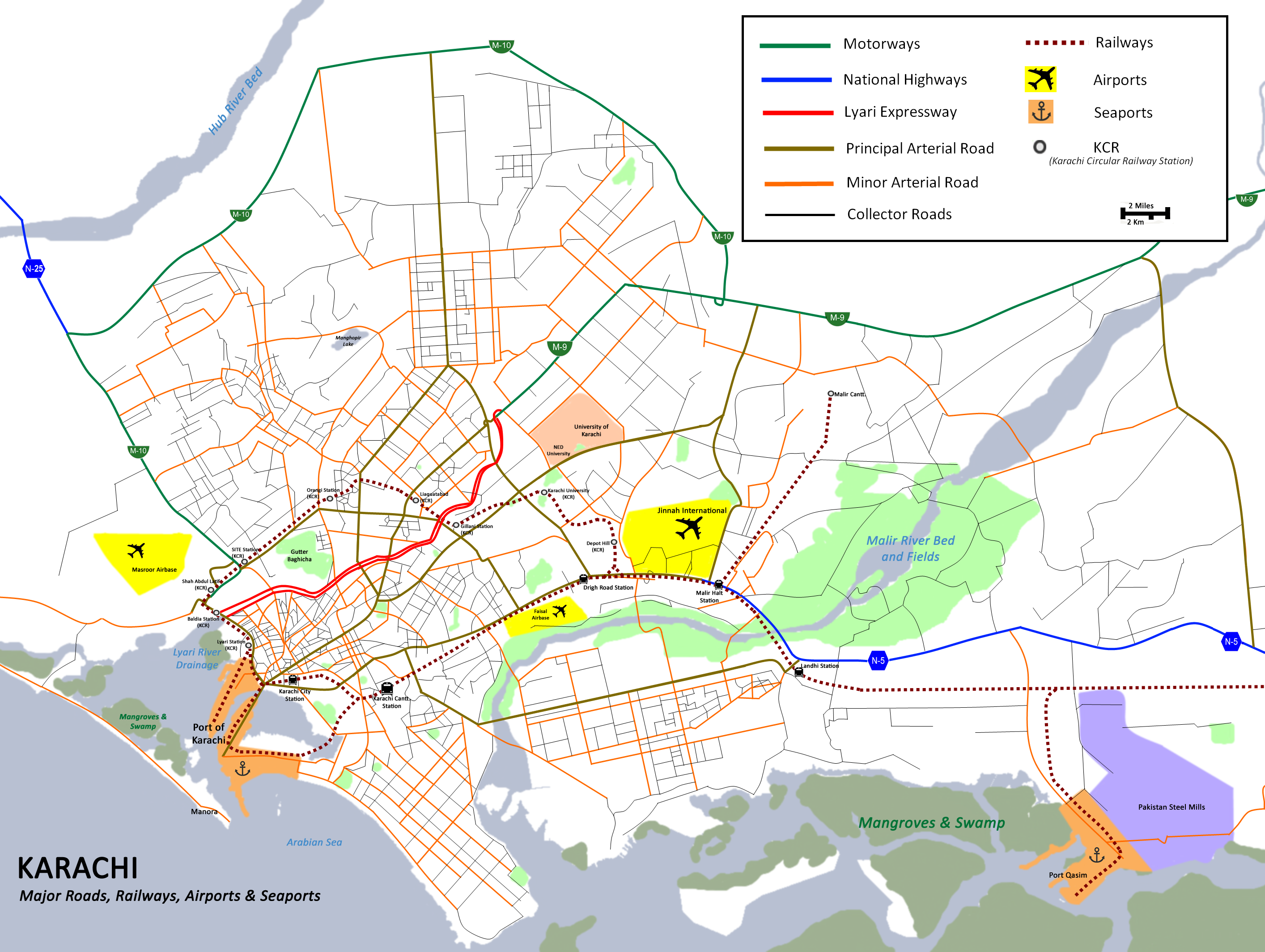
- Location in Karachi

The Greenwich University or GU (Urdu: گرین وچ یونیورسٹی کراچی) is a private research university located in the residential beach neighborhood DHA Karachi, Karachi, Sindh in Pakistan. It is recognized by the Higher Education Commission (HEC) as an autonomous degree-awarding university and offers undergraduate, graduate, postgraduate, and doctorate programs. The university is ranked amongst the top 10 business schools of bachelors in Pakistan. It also offers exchange options for degree programs in affiliation with other institutions overseas. The university offers programs in management sciences and social sciences as well as fashion studies.

== History ==
The university was first established as Greenwich Institute in 1987.

== Alums ==
The university has alums that include individuals such as MNAs (Member National Assembly), MPAs (Member Provincial Assembly), and CEOs of national and multinational organizations.

== See also ==
- Higher Education Commission of Pakistan
- Pakistan Educational Research Network
