= University of Mirpurkhas =

Public university in Mirpurkhas, Sindh, Pakistan

The University of Mirpurkhas
- UMPK
- Type: Public
- Established: 20 August 2023; 2 years ago
- Affiliations: Higher Education Commission (Pakistan); Pakistan Engineering Council; Pakistan Bar Council
- Chancellor: Governor of Sindh
- Vice-Chancellor: Professor Dr. Rafiq Ahmed Memon
- Students: 40,000 (full time only)
- Location: Mirpurkhas, Sindh, Pakistan
- Campus: 1,279 acres (5.18 km^{2})
- Nickname: UoMps
- Website: https://umpk.edu.pk/#

The University of Mirpurkhas (Urdu: میرپورخاص يونيورسٹی; informally Mirpurkhas University or UoMps) is a public research university located in Mirpurkhas, Pakistan, established on 20 August 2023. The University of Mirpurkhas Bill, 2023 having been passed by the Provincial Assembly of Sindh on 24 July 2023 and assented to by the Governor of Sindh on 20 August 2023 is hereby published as an Act of the Legislature of Sindh.

== Departments ==
=== Faculty of Commerce and Business Administration ===
- BS Business Administration
- BS Commerce

=== Faculty of Science ===
- BS Computer Science
- BS Information Technology
- BS Data Science

=== Faculty of Arts ===
- BS English Language and Literature
- BS Applied Linguistics
- BS Banking and Finance
