= Dadabhoy Institute of Higher Education =

Pakistani educational institution

- دادا بھائی انسٹیٹیوٹ آف ہائر ایجوکیشن
- Type: Private
- Established: 2003
- Location: Karachi, Sindh, Pakistan
- Website: www.dadabhoy.edu.pk

The Dadabhoy Institute of Higher Education (DIHE) (Urdu: دادا بھائی انسٹیٹیوٹ آف ہائر ایجوکیشن) is an educational institution in Karachi offering undergraduate, graduate and postgraduate education.

== History ==
It was founded in 2000. It was awarded the university status after passage of The Dadabhoy Institute of Higher Education Act, 2004.

== Degree programs ==
It offers degree programs in science, business education, law, computer science, and education.
