= DHA Suffa University =

University in Sindh, Pakistan

Coordinates: 24.8147°N 67.0796°E

- ڈی ایچ اے جامعة الصفّہ
- Other name: DSU
- Motto: Learn to discover
- Type: Private
- Established: 2012
- Academic affiliations: HEC, PEC, Washington Accord, NCEAC, NBEAC
- Chancellor: Lt Gen Babar Iftikhar HI(M)
- Vice-Chancellor: Prof. Dr. Ahmed Saeed Minhas
- Dean: Ahmad Hussain (EAS)
- Academic staff: ≈121
- Administrative staff: ≈222
- Students: ≈4202
- Location: Karachi, Sindh, Pakistan
- Campus: Residential
- Colours: Maroon, white, orange
- Website: www.dsu.edu.pk

DHA Suffa University (DSU) (Urdu: ڈی ایچ اے جامعة الصفّہ) is a non-profit private sector university named after Suffah of Masjid-e-Nabwi. It is located in the Phase VII (extension) of Defence Housing Authority, Karachi, in Sindh, Pakistan.

The university received its Charter in 2002 and started operations in 2012. The university offers undergraduate and post-graduate degree programs in mechanical engineering, electrical engineering, civil engineering, computer science, software engineering, data sciences, accounting and finance, management sciences, English linguistics, Psychology, International Relations, Business Analytics & Programming, Computational & Industrial Mathematics.

== History ==
DHA Suffa University was granted Charter by the Government of Sindh in 2002 and was established in 2012. The university derives its name "Suffa" from the rectangular platform called Suffah in Al-Masjid an-Nabawi, where companions of Muhammad used to gather to seek knowledge. The construction of the DHA Phase VII (Ext) campus, spreading over five acres (2.0 ha) of land, was started in 2004 and completed in 2007. The capacity of this campus is 2000 students. DSU's most recent initiative includes its new DCK Campus in DHA City Karachi. Spreading over 30 acres of prime land at DHA City Karachi, it has the capacity to accommodate 3000 students in the first phase and will form the nucleus of the Education City at DCK. This new campus has become operational from 2020, with the launch of DSU's BE (Civil) program.

DSU was recognized as a private sector degree-awarding institution by the Higher Education Commission of Pakistan (HEC) in the year 2012. In its very first participation in the annual ranking process of HEC for the year 2014, DSU achieved the impressive ranking of 31 out of 169 public and private sector universities of Pakistan.

The BE (Mechanical) and BE (Electrical) and BE (Civil) programs of DSU are accredited by the Pakistan Engineering Council (PEC). The BS (Computer Science) program is accredited and approved by the National Computing Education Accreditation Council (NCEAC) and BBA and MBA programs conform to the standards of National Business Education Accreditation Council (NBEAC).

The university has been inspected and evaluated by the Government of Sindh's Charter Inspection and Evaluation Committee (CIEC) periodically. On all occasions, the CIEC was pleased to see the rapid growth of the university and the high standards of education being maintained.

The university also has MOU's and agreements with international universities in Europe and Asia. It has a dedicated International Education Resource Center (IERC) that facilitates students’ participation in educational foreign mobility programs and invites foreign experts to conduct on-campus seminars, trainings and workshops.

== Degree programs ==
DHA Suffa University offers the following degree programs:

=== Bachelor's degree programs ===
- Bachelor of Mechanical Engineering
- Bachelor of Electrical Engineering
- Bachelor of Civil Engineering
- Bachelor of Computer Science
- Bachelor of Software Engineering
- BS (Data Sciences)
- Bachelor of Business Administration
- BS (Accounting & Finance)
- BS (English)
- BS (International Relations)
- BS (Psychology)
- BS Business Analytics & Programming
- BS Computational & Industrial Mathematics

=== Master's degree programs ===
- ME (Mechanical Engineering)
- ME (Electrical Engineering)
- MS (Computer Science)
- MS (Management Sciences)
- MBA

=== Doctoral programs ===
- PhD (Mechanical Engineering)
- PhD (Electrical Engineering)
- PhD (Computer Science)
- PhD (Management Sciences)
