= Nazeer Hussain University =

University in Karachi, Pakistan

Coordinates: 24.9229°N 67.0507°E

- دانشگاہِ نذیر حسین
- Motto in English: To Provide Quality Education
- Type: Private
- Established: 2013
- Affiliations: HEC, PEC, PCATP, PCP
- Chancellor: Engr. Farhat M. Khan
- Vice-Chancellor: Prof. Dr. Masroor Ahmed Shaikh
- Academic staff: 150+
- Students: 3500+
- Undergraduates: 2000+
- Location: Karachi, Sindh, Pakistan
- Nickname: NHU
- Website: http://www.nhu.edu.pk/

Nazeer Hussain University (NHU) (Urdu: دانشگاہِ نذیر حسین) is a private university located in Karachi, Sindh, Pakistan. It was established in 2013.

== Faculties and Departments ==
- Faculty of Architecture and Built Environment
- Faculty of Business and Management Sciences
- Faculty of Engineering Practices and Sciences
- Faculty of Pharmacy

== See also ==
- List of universities in Pakistan
