= Newports Institute of Communications and Economics =

- Motto: Knowledge, Wisdom, Awareness
- Type: Private
- Established: 1993
- Affiliations: Higher Education Commission of Pakistan
- Chairman: Brig.(R) Sadiq Jamal
- Rector: Dr. Abdul Rehman
- Location: Karachi, Sindh, Pakistan
- Nickname: NICE
- Website: http://www.newports.edu.pk/

Newports Institute of Communications and Economics (NICE) (Sindhi: نيو پورٽس انسٽيٽيوٽ آف ڪميونيڪيشنس اين ايڪانامڪس) is a private institute in Karachi, Sindh, Pakistan.

== Degree programs ==
NICE offers following degree programs:

=== Bachelor's programs ===
- BBA (Hons.) 4 Year Program
- BS Computer Science 4 Years
- Bachelor of Commerce (B.Com) 4 Years Program
- BA - Textile Design 4 Years Program
- BA - Fashion Design 4 Years Program
- BA - Fine Arts 4 Years Program
- BS Electronics Engineering Technology 4 Year Program
- BS Electrical Engineering Technology 4 Year Program
- BS Mechanical Engineering Technology 4 Year Program
- BS Civil Engineering Technology 4 Year Program

=== Master's programs ===
- MBA (Regular) 3.5 Years
- MBA (Regular) 1.5 Years
- Executive MBA 2 Years Program
- Master of Commerce (M.Com) 2 Years
- MS (Computer Science) 2 Years
