= Ilma University =

Private university in Karachi, Pakistan

Ilma University (Formerly IBT)
- عِلما يونیورسٹی
- Other names: IBT, Biztek
- Former names: Institute of Business & Technology (IBT)
- Type: Private
- Established: 2001
- Accreditation: Higher Education Commission of Pakistan
- Chairperson: Kanwal H. Lakhani
- Chancellor: Noman Abid Lakhani
- Vice-Chancellor: Mansoor Uz Zafar Dawood
- Students: 20,000+
- Location: Karachi, Sindh, Pakistan; 24.8087°N 67.1210°E
- Campus: 2
- Colours
- Website: www.ilmauniversity.edu.pk
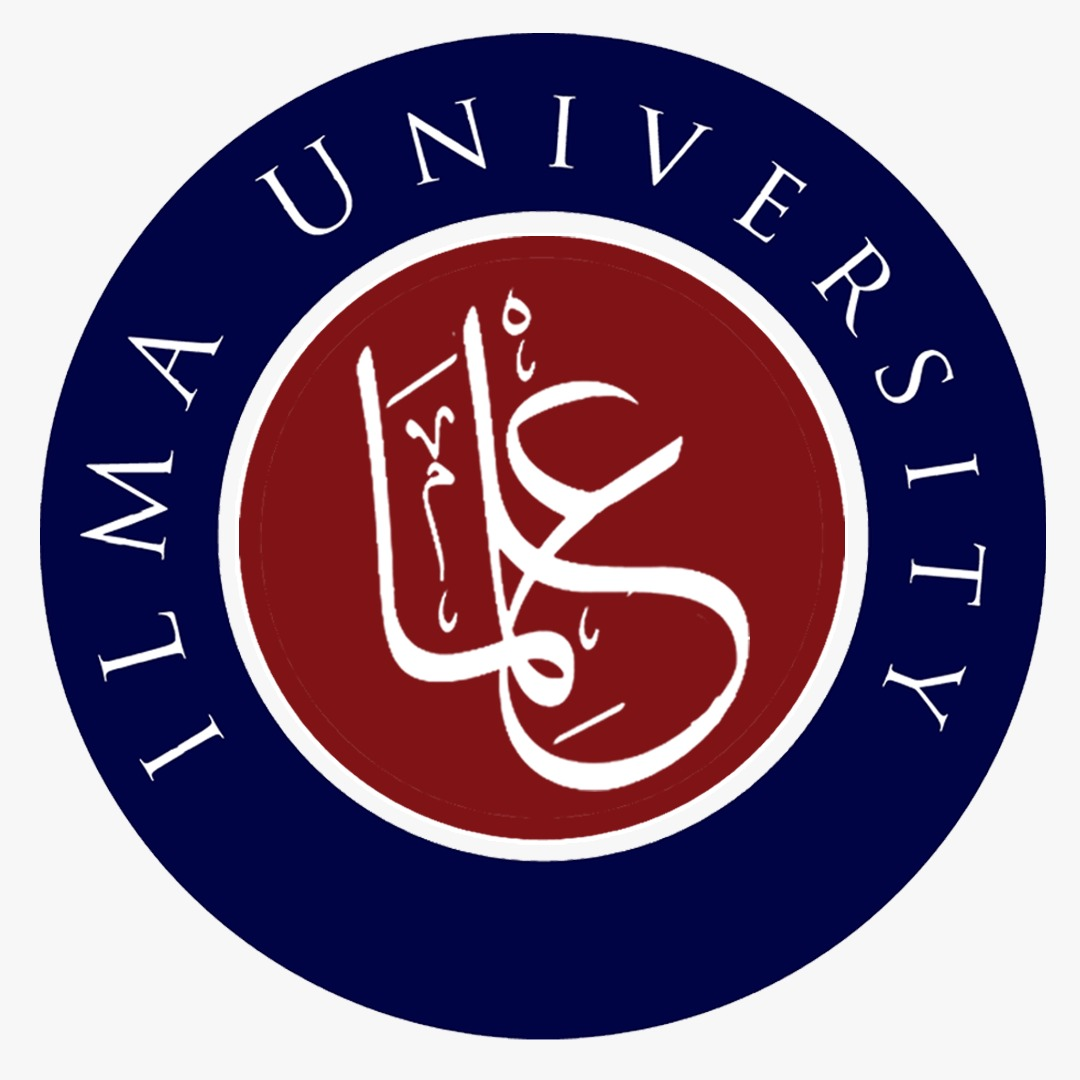

Ilma University (Urdu: عِلما يونیورسٹی), formerly known as the Institute of Business & Technology, is a private and independent university based in Karachi, Sindh Pakistan. It was granted university status in May 2017 through legislation passed by the Provincial Assembly of Sindh. The university is officially recognised by the Higher Education Commission (Pakistan).

The main campus is located on Ibrahim Hyderi Road near Korangi Creek in Karachi. It includes academic departments, classrooms, an auditorium, media and computer labs, a digital library, faculty offices, a girls' common room, a mosque, a bookshop, counselling and admissions offices, a cafeteria, restrooms on each floor, and various sports clubs. Ilma University also operates an additional campus in Gulshan-e-Iqbal.

== See also ==
- Higher Education Commission of Pakistan
- List of universities in Pakistan
