= Preston University (Pakistan) =

Private university Islamabad Pakistan

Preston University Islamabad, Pakistan
- جامعہ پریسٹن اسلام آباد
- Established: 1984; 41 years ago
- President: Abdul Basit
- Administrative staff: 1000+
- Students: 100,000+
- Postgraduates: 9,999
- Location: Islamabad, Islamabad, Pakistan
- Affiliations: Affiliated
- Website: www.preston.edu.pk

Preston University Islamabad (Pakistan) (Urdu: جامعہ پریسٹن اسلام آباد) is a private university in Pakistan. It was established as the School of Business and Commerce in 1984. The university is currently located in Kohat (main campus), Islamabad, Peshawar, Lahore, and Karachi. It is recognized by the Higher Education Commission of Pakistan (HEC). Preston University is the first private university of Pakistan.

Preston University has received two charters: the first from the Government of Khyber Pakhtunkhwa, known as Preston University Kohat, and the second from the Government of Sindh, referred to as Preston University Karachi. Preston University Karachi previously operated two campuses in Ajman, UAE; however, these were closed in 2015 due to accreditation challenges with the UAE government.
