= Textile Institute of Pakistan =

- Type: Private
- Established: 1994
- Affiliations: Higher Education Commission (Pakistan)
- Chancellor: Ms. Nausheen Ahmad
- President: Dr. Zubair Bandukda
- Students: 435
- Location: Main Campus: EZ/1/P-8, Eastern Zone, Bin Qasim Karachi - Pakistan, Karachi, Sindh, Pakistan; 24.83678°N 67.43393°E
- Campus: 55 Acre; Urban
- Website: tip.edu.pk

The Textile Institute of Pakistan (TIP) (Urdu: ٹیکسٹائل انسٹیٹیوٹ آف پاکستان) is a private institute in Karachi, Sindh, Pakistan. The Institute was established by the All Pakistan Textile Mills Association (APTMA) in 1994 to create textile professionals to support Pakistan's textile industry. Textile Institute of Pakistan is one of the best art and design institutes in the country.

The Textile Institute of Pakistan (TIP) is recognized by the Higher Education Commission of Pakistan (HEC) as a degree-awarding institution.

TIP offers four-year, eight-semester Bachelor's Degree programs in the following disciplines:

- BS Textile Science (TS)
- BS Textile Design Technology (TDT)
- BBA Textile Management and Marketing (TMM)
- BBA Apparel Manufacturing and Merchandising (AMM)
- BBA Fashion Design Management (FDM)

As of November 2025, the President of TIP is Dr. Zubair Bandukda.

In the past, TIP has been led by Mr. Humayun Zafar and before him, Dr. Zubair Bandukda, Mr. Tariq Ikram, former CE Trade & Development Authority of Pakistan (TDAP), former Chairman Export Promotion Bureau (EPB) and former Minister of State, and writer and intellectual Mr. Irfan Husain.

TIP's founding chancellor was Dr. Eqbal Ahmad. Since Dr. Ahmad's demise, architect and thinker Mr. Arif Hasan has served this position. The present Chancellor of Textile Institute of Pakistan is Ms. Nausheen Ahmad.

== See also ==
- All Pakistan Textile Mills Association
