= Salim Habib University =

Private university in Sindh, Pakistan

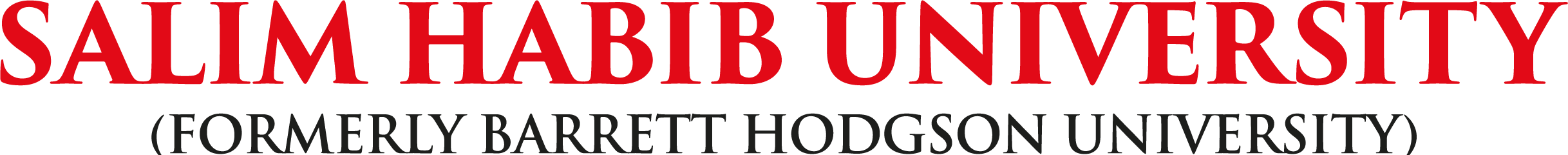
- Type: Private
- Established: 2016; 10 years ago
- Affiliations: Higher Education Commission (Pakistan), Pakistan Engineering Council, Pharmacy Council of Pakistan, National Computing Education Accreditation Council
- Chancellor: Dr. Iram Afaq
- Vice-Chancellor: Dr. Syed Irfan Hyder
- Location: Karachi, Sindh, Pakistan
- Campus: Urban
- Nickname: SHU
- Website: shu.edu.pk

The Salim Habib University (SHU) is a private university located in Karachi, Sindh, Pakistan. It was established in 2016. It offers multiple programs in the disciplines of Biomedical Engineering, Biosciences, Pharmaceutical Sciences, Information Technology, and Management Sciences.
