= Jinnah University for Women =

University in Karachi, Pakistan

Coordinates: 24.925144°N 67.029912°E

- جامعہِ جناح برائے خواتین
- Motto in English: Enter to learn and go to serve
- Type: Private
- Established: 1998
- Founder: Al-Haj Molvi Rayazuddin Ahmed
- Affiliations: HEC
- Chancellor: Wajeehuddin Ahmed
- Vice-Chancellor: Prof. Dr. Naeem Farooqui
- Academic staff: 300+
- Administrative staff: 215
- Students: 7000+
- Location: Karachi, Sindh, Pakistan
- Campus: Urban
- Colours: Cerulean, Grey
- Nickname: JUW
- Website: juw.edu.pk

The Jinnah University for Women (JUW) (Urdu: جامعہِ جناح برائے خواتین) is a private research university in Karachi, Sindh, Pakistan. It is an all-woman university and is the first women's university in the country.

Established as a post-graduate college, its status as full-fledged university was upgraded in 1998 the Sindh Assembly. Major financial endowment and funding are managed by the Anjuman-e-Islam Trust. The university offers undergraduate, post-graduate, and doctoral programmes in science, arts, humanities, and general studies. As of 2010, the university was ranked among top institution of higher learning in "general category" by the HEC.

== The Founder ==
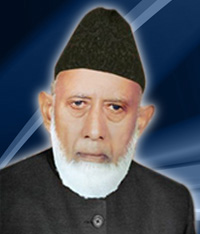
Al Haj Moulvi Rayazuddin Ahmed (T.I)

Al Hāj Moulvi Rayazuddin Ahmed (Tamgha-e-Imtiaz), a direct descendant of Sheikh Saleem Uddin Chishty, was born in 1906 in the city of Taj Mahal, the city of intellectuals and poets. His early upbringing through parents and education instilled in him love for education in spite of being enslaved in government service.

Alhaj Molve Riyazuddin Ahmed (الحاج مولوی ریاض الدین احمد)was a visionary who recognized the importance of female education during an era dominated by traditional values and conventional thinking. His progressive views often clashed with societal norms, but he remained steadfast in his commitment to women's literacy. He founded the Anjuman-e-Islamia Trust, which played a crucial role in establishing several educational institutions. Notably, he was a pioneer in promoting Muslim women's education in the region. Before the partition of India, Ahmed established the Mahmooda Neswan School and Library in Agra, aimed at providing education to female students. Following the partition in 1947, he migrated to Karachi, Pakistan, where he continued his educational mission despite financial challenges. He was instrumental in founding around 17 educational institutions the Jinnah College and Jinnah University for Women in Nazimabad Ahmed's dedication to female education led to the establishment of the first girls' school at Pakistan Chowk, which later relocated to Nazimabad. His efforts were recognized by the government of Pakistan, which awarded the Tamgha-e-Imtiaz,, one of the country's highest civilian honors. Ahmed's life and work were characterized by his unwavering commitment to education and social reform. His contributions significantly advanced the cause of female literacy and empowerment in Pakistan, leaving a lasting legacy that continues to inspire future generations. In addition to his educational endeavors, Ahmed was actively involved in the Indian freedom movement under the Muslim League, influenced by the leadership of Quaid-e-Azam Muhammad Ali Jinnah. . Jinnah's influence was profound on Ahmed, who was granted the honor of using Jinnah's name for a college he planned to establish in Agra. After migrating to Pakistan, he maintained his political engagement, notably contesting elections in 1962. Maulvi Riazuddin Ahmed's impact on society is commemorated through various publications and accolades, highlighting his contributions to education and community service. His legacy is celebrated by institutions like the Jinnah University for Women, which continues to uphold his mission of spreading the light of knowledge.

In that era of conventional thoughts and traditional values he envisaged that female education was of paramount importance. His revolutionary thoughts clashed with the norms of his day but his commitment and dedication to women literacy did not subside. He was the founder of Anjuman-e-Islamia Trust which heralded the inception of many educational institutions. He was, in a way, pioneer of Muslims female education in this region.

== Campus ==
The Jinnah University campus is divided into five blocks — Block A, Block B, Block C, Block D, Block E — and Admissions section. These blocks include an auditorium with the capacity of 400 persons, lecture halls, classrooms, laboratories, museums, faculty rooms and seminar libraries. The university is in Nazimabad, Karachi.

The university comprises four distinct faculties, each offering a range of bachelor's and master's degree programs. The Faculty of Science and Faculty of Arts provide four-year bachelor's and two-year master's degrees. The Faculty of Pharmacy features a five-year bachelor's program, with a focus on pharmaceutical sciences. The Faculty of Business Administration and Commerce encompasses business studies, with four-year bachelor's and two-year master's degrees.
