= Karachi Institute of Economics and Technology =

Private higher education institution in Karachi, Pakistan

PAF - Karachi Institute of Economics and Technology
- درسگاہِ کراچی برائے علومِ معاشیات و فنونِ سائنسی
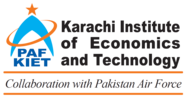
- Former name: PAF-KIET
- Type: Private
- Established: 1997
- Affiliations: Higher Education Commission of Pakistan, National Computing Education Accreditation Council(NCEAC), Pakistan Engineering Council, National Technology Council (Pakistan)
- Chancellor: Mirza Zafar Hussain
- President: Khalid Khan
- Dean: Muzzaffar Mahmood
- Students: 5000
- Location: Karachi, Pakistan
- Campus: Rural, 22 acres (0.1 km^{2})
- Website: kiet.edu.pk

PAF Karachi Institute of Economics and Technology (KIET) (Urdu: درسگاہِ کراچی برائے علومِ معاشیات و فنونِ سائنسی) was established in 1997. PAF KIET received recognition by the Higher Education Commission (formerly named UGC) vide letter no. 15-22/UGC-SEC/97/1291 dated 1 August 1998. HEC ranks.

PAF KIET was awarded a degree-granting status through a charter from the government of Sindh on 24 May 2000. PAF KIET has also been granted NCEAC Accreditation for its BSCS, MCS program.

== History ==
In June 2000, Pakistan Air Force and Pakistan Educational Foundation agreed to collaborate for the establishment of an educational institution at PAF Korangi Creek Base.

=== 1997–2000 ===
The Karachi Institute of Economics and Technology was launched in 1997. Academic departments offering degrees in Management Science and Computer Science were established. The Department of Management Science offered BBA and MBA degrees with specializations in the fields of Management, Marketing, and Finance. Department of Computer Science offered BCS with majoring option for Software Engineering/Networking, MCS and MS–IT NCEAC accredited degrees.

=== 2000–2003 ===
In September 2000 the institute moved to its current location at PAF Base Korangi Creek. The campus is spread over 22 acres (0.09 km^{2}).

The City campus of KIET was established in April 2002 to provide evening programs for the working students. The campus is located off Shahrah-e-Faisal near Nursery.

The North campus of KIET is located at North Nazimabad near KDA Chowrangi, Karachi. The North Campus offers Bachelors, Master, MPhil and PhD level degrees.

=== 2003–2006 ===
The departments of Management Sciences and Computer Sciences were elevated to the status of Colleges. The College of Computing & Information Sciences and the College of Management Sciences started offering advanced research oriented degree programs of MS and PhD. Specialization in MIS, Finance and Accounting were added.

Department of Corporate Relations and R&D Departments were launched.

Two more academic colleges were established; namely, the College of Engineering and the College of Humanities and Sciences. The College of Engineering offered a 4-year BE in Electronics with specialization in Electronics and Telecommunications, which has been converted into BE in Electrical with specialization of Electronics and Telecommunications. Additionally, the College offers BE(Mechatronics) and BE (Avionics). The College of Humanities & Social Sciences offers courses in Mathematics, English, Oral and Written Communication and Social Sciences areas.

In 2005 the institute added specializations in the BE in Electronics. These include Computer Systems, Avionics, and Industrial Electronics. MS in Telecommunication Engineering was also launched. In fall 2008 another specialization was added as Mechatronics

A program of Bachelor of Computer Arts (BCA) was launched.

=== 2006–2019 ===
KIET gets PEC Accreditation for its engineering programs and NCEAC accreditation for its Computer Science programs. HEC ranks KIET as a six-star university for its IT Department.

=== 2020–present ===
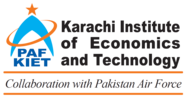
KIET Logo

Started using full illegal name as brand with abbreviation "Karachi Institute of Economics and Technology (KIET)" in newspapers advert.

== Colleges & Departments ==
- College of Management Sciences
- College of Engineering
- College of Computing and Information Sciences
- College of Media & Arts
- Graduate School of Science and Engineering

== College of Management Sciences ==
=== Programs ===
The College of Management offers programs leading to bachelor, master's degree and PHD degree in business administration and Aviation Management. The College offers a 4-year Bachelors of Business Administration degree with specialization in Marketing, Finance, Human Resource Management, logistic and supply chain management, Advertising and Media Management, customer relationship Management, project Management and Production and Operation Management

=== Market Forces ===
College of Management Sciences publishes twice a year, research journal recognized by HEC (Y-category).

=== IRCBM-2020 ===
College of Management Sciences, organized "International Research Conference on Business & Management" (IRCBM-2020) on 1 & 2 April 2020. The theme of the conference was “Redefining Business Opportunities in Emerging Markets”.

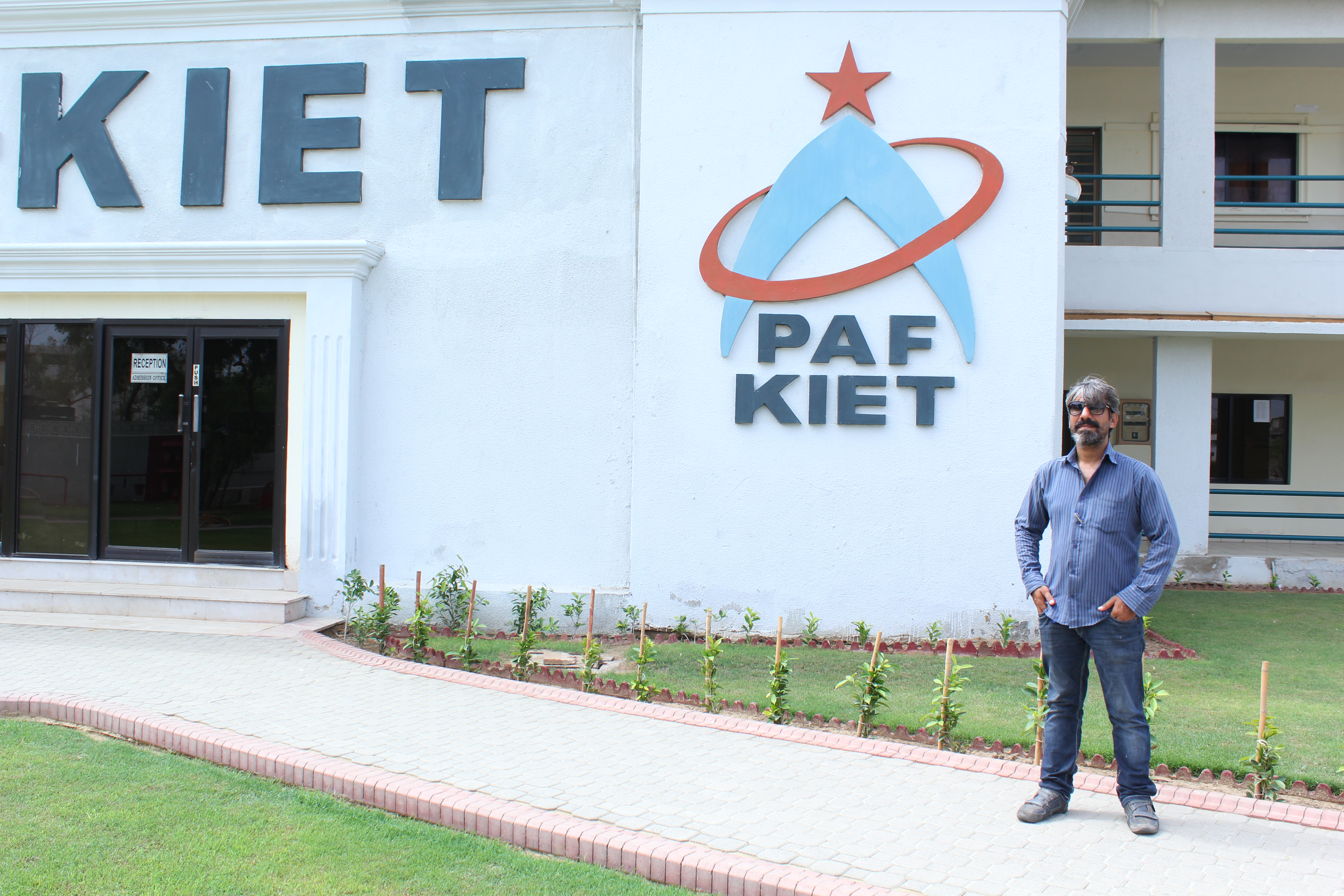

== College of Engineering ==
=== Programs ===
The College of Engineering offers programs leading to bachelor and master's degrees in Engineering. The college offers a 4-year Bachelor of Engineering degree in electrical engineering with specialization in telecommunication & electronics, Avionics and Mechatronics. The college offers a research-based Master of Science in the field of electronics engineering.

KIET also provides a College of Media Arts 4 year bachelor's degree in film Making, graphics Animation and one year master.

=== Research at CoE ===
MS program in Telecommunication Engineering has been designed to provide a framework for research by students and faculty.

There are several students involved in the MS research. Research is taking place in the following areas: Quality of Service for Voice over IP Networks, Mobile Ad hoc Networks, High Speed Data Services for Wireless Networks, MPLS Networks, Reachability and Stability in personal area networks, Security of wireless LANs, and wired and Wireless communication devices. Several research papers have been published by the faculty in reputed journals, magazines and conferences.

=== Intellect 2019 ===
College of Engineering, organized conference, "International Conference on Latest trends in Electrical Engineering and Computing Technologies (Intellect 2019)" on 13–14 November 2019 in Karachi.

== Graduate School of Science and Engineering ==
=== Fire Fighting Robot! ===
Fire fighting robots developed by IMR Lab were tested at KIET along with the Pakistan Air Force firefighting team. Two robots were the wheeled mobile robot and the tread based robot. Alhamdulillah both the robots carried the fire hose directly connected from the fire brigade to the testing area and extinguish fire. The cost of the project is 14.68 million PKR funded by ICT RnD.
