= Institute of Business Management, Karachi =

Private university and business school in Pakistan

Institute of Business Management
- Type: Private sector institute
- Established: 1995
- Founders: Shahjehan Syed Karim
- Affiliations: Higher Education Commission of Pakistan; Pakistan Engineering Council
- Chancellor: Muhammad Bashir Jan Muhammad
- President: Talib Syed Karim
- Academic staff: Visiting: 192 Full time: 162
- Students: 6000+ (2023)
- Undergraduates: 3000+ (2017)
- Postgraduates: 2146 (2017)
- Doctoral students: 53 (2017)
- Location: Karachi, Sindh, Pakistan; 24.8127°N 67.1178°E
- Campus: Main Campus: 11 acres (0.045 km^{2})
- Nickname: IoBM, Karachi

The Institute of Business Management (IoBM) is a private university and business school in Karachi, Pakistan. IoBM is composed of four colleges, the College of Business Management (CBM), the College of Economics and Social Development (CESD), the College of Computer Science and Information Systems (CCSIS) and the College of Engineering Sciences (CES).

In January 1998, a bill was unanimously approved by the Provincial Assembly of Sindh for establishing a university known as the Institute of Business Management in the private sector.

In 2022, Kamran Tessori, Governor of Sindh, speaking at this institute's annual convocation, described it as Pakistan's key educational institutions. He is also quoted as stating, "In the form of IoBM, late Shahjahan S. Karim has given the country an institution that now has become a pride for Pakistan. Today, as you graduate from this auspicious university, it is crucial to embrace and portray the positive side of Pakistan as you step into the corporate world".

== Recognized institute ==
Institute of Business Management, Karachi is a recognized institute by the Higher Education Commission of Pakistan.

== Overview ==
IoBM started in 1995 as a College of Business Management offering BBA, MBA and Phd degrees.

IoBM is built on a 9 acres (36,000 m^{2}) site.

IoBM is the only university in Pakistan, where Undergraduate programs Bachelor's Programs, BBA (Honors), BS Computer Science, BS Data Science and BS Software Engineering, BS Technology Management, BE Electrical Engineering, B.Ed. Honors and all BS Joint (Honors) are offered, most of the degrees have a compulsory foreign language course, which makes IoBM programs distinguished.

List of foreign language courses include:

1. Arabic
2. Chinese
3. French
4. German (Deutsche)
5. Italian

Mostly, these languages are taught by persons belonging to their respective embassies.

== Academic programs ==
=== College of Business Management ===
- BBA (Honors)
- BS (Honors) Economics and Finance
- BS (Honors) Accounting and Finance
- BS Entrepreneurship
- BS Social Entrepreneurship and Social Leadership
- BS Industrial Management
- BS Logistics and Supply Chain Management
- MBA (Regular)
- MBA (Executive)
- MBA Health and Hospital Management
- MBA Advertising and Media Management
- MBA Finance and Risk Management
- MBA Environment and Energy Management
- MBA Educational Management
- MBA Logistics and Supply Chain Management
- MS in Business Management
- MS in English Applied Linguistics
- MPhil in Business Management
- PhD in Business Management
- PhD in Environmental and Energy Management

=== College of Computer Science and Information Systems ===
- BS Computer Science
- BS Actuarial Science and Risk Management
- BS Mathematics and Economics
- BS Data Science
- BS Mathematics and Computational Finance
- BS Software Engineering
- BS Statistics and Business Analytics
- MS Mathematics and Scientific Computing
- MS Statistics and Scientific Computing
- MS Computer Science
- PhD Computer Science
- PhD Statistics and Scientific Computing

=== College of Engineering and Sciences ===
- BE Electrical Engineering in Electronic and Telecommunication
- MS Engineering Management
- MS in Electrical Engineering

=== College of Economics and Social Development ===
- BS (Honors) Accountancy, Management & Law
- BS (Honors) Media Studies
- BS Economics, Law and International Relations (ELI)
- BS Economics, Media and International Relations (EMI)
- BS (Honors) in Business and Psychology
- BS Psychology
- BS Education
- MBA Educational Management
- MSc Organizational Psychology and Human Resource Management
- MSc Energy Economics, Environment and Policy
- MPhil in Organizational Psychology
- MS Economics
- MPhil Education
- PhD Education
- PhD Economics

== Admissions ==
IoBM admissions are held twice in a year (March and August) for all programs and thrice ( March, June & Dec) for Executive MBA Students

== Student life ==
IoBM has a unique type of Event Organization system as compared to other institutes in Karachi. Here, students of different societies arrange all the events themselves with no professional or financial help from IoBM as IoBM's management believes that its students should be self-dependent & take up tasks themselves which will have a positive impact on their personality development. All the recent events in IoBM such as Fun Week (the last week of a graduating batch), CBMUN (Model United Nation) Jashan e Baharan, the Public talk by Imran Khan had been arranged by the society members themselves.

- Entertainment Plus Society (EPS) - Organised all the events related to entertainment such as concerts, functions etc.
- Digicon Informatics Society (DIS)
- Social Welfare And Trust (SWAT) - Responsible for social work
- Alumni Development Program (ADP)
- Mathematics society
- Dialogue Society
- Egalitarians Society - Responsible for raising awareness on Socio-Economic, Political and Philosophical issues such as Economic Justice, Gender Equity, Climate Change, Social Welfare etc. They organize events such as Conferences where Activists, Journalists and Intellectuals are given a platform to educate the youth.
- Strategic Human Resource Society (SHRS)
- The Literary and Public Speaking Society - Responsible for organizing debates, and a literature festival.
- CBM Society of Health Managers (CSHM)
- The Management Society
- The Marketing Society
- Vanquishers - Organizing the sports events in IoBM.
- Canva society
- IoBM Club For Entrepreneurs.
- Actuarial Science & Risk Management Society (ARMS)

== Membership in professional bodies ==
IoBM is an active member of the following international and national professional bodies.

- International Association of Universities
- International Association of University Presidents
- Association of Commonwealth Universities, UK
- Council for Higher Education Accreditation, United States
- Association of Universities of Asia and the Pacific (AUAP), Thailand
- Association to Advance Collegiate Schools of Business, USA
- Asian Media Information and Communication Centre (AMIC), Singapore
- Management Association of Pakistan (MAP), (Member, Executive Committee)
- Marketing Association of Pakistan (Vice President for the year 2010–2011)
- Employers Federation of Pakistan
- Institute of Corporate Governance
- International Finance Corporation, USA (IFC)
