= Danyal Chaudhry =

Member of the National Assembly of Pakistan from Rawalpindi (2024–2029)

- دانیال چوہدری

Member of the National Assembly of Pakistan
- Incumbent
- Assumed office 29 February 2024
- Constituency: NA-57 Rawalpindi-VI

Personal details
- Born: Rawalpindi, Punjab, Pakistan
- Party: PMLN (2018-present)
- Parent: Chaudhary Tanvir Khan (father)

Danyal Chaudhry (Urdu: دانیال چوہدری) is a Pakistani politician who has been a Member of the National Assembly of Pakistan since February 2024. Currently he has a charge of being involved in the assassination of Chaudhry Adnan a former MPA and Parliamentary Secretary Punjab

== Biography ==
Chaudhry is the son of Chaudhary Tanvir Khan.

He began his political career in 2018 and ran for the seat of the National Assembly of Pakistan from Constituency NA-62 Rawalpindi-VI as a candidate of Pakistan Muslim League (N) (PML-N) in the 2018 Pakistani general election but was unsuccessful. He received 91,879 votes, losing to Sheikh Rasheed Ahmad, who garnered 119,362 votes. Media reports indicated that nominating Chaudhry as a PML-N candidate for the election also led to internal conflicts within the party ranks.

In September 2022, a Rawalpindi court had charged Chaudhry and his father with illegally seizing government property after an Anti-Corruption Department had alleged that both illegally occupied 27 acres of government land in 2019.

In the 2024 Pakistani general election, he again received a PML-N ticket to run for the seat of the National Assembly from Constituency NA-57 Rawalpindi-VI. According to media reports, he also submitted nomination papers to run for seat in NA-56 Rawalpindi-V as well a seat in the Provincial Assembly of the Punjab. Some influential leaders of PML-N from the constituency, including the Senior Vice President of PML-N Rawalpindi, strongly opposed the party's decision to nominate Danyal as the candidate and announced a boycott of the election campaign in protest.

A few days prior to the election, he, along with his father and brothers, was booked by the police after being accused in the assassination attempt of Chaudhry Muhammad Adnan, a candidate of Pakistan Tehreek-e-Insaf (PTI), who was also running in the 2024 general election from same Constituency NA-57 Rawalpindi-VI as Chaudhry. According to the First information report (FIR), Adnan had a political rivalry with Chaudhry and his father Chaudhry Tanveer Khan.

Subsequently, Chaudhry won the 2024 Pakistani election from constituency NA-57 Rawalpindi-VI as a PML-N candidate. He received 83,331 votes while runner up Independent Supported (PTI) Pakistan Tehreek-e-Insaf, candidate Seemabia Tahir received 56,789 votes. On 29 February, he assumed the office as the Member of the National Assembly.

Following the election, police arrested the shooters of Adnan and said that they have "obtained important information [from ‘shooters] which could lead them to the mastermind of the murder". They sent a request to the Federal Investigation Agency (FIA) to place the names of Chaudhry and his father on the Provincial National Identification List (PNIL) to prevent them from leaving Pakistan, and also made them part of the investigation related to the assassination of Adnan. Subsequently, Chaudhry, together with his father Chaudhary Tanvir Khan, was added to the FIA's PNIL in March 2024 and were barred from leaving Pakistan. According to media reports, Adnan had repeatedly expressed concerns about his safety, indicating that he perceived Chaudhry and his father as a threat and also made it explicitly clear that if any harm came to him, he would hold Chaudhry and his father accountable.

The police officer who captured the "shooters" involved in the assassination of Adnan was removed from his post in March 2024. The removal caused surprise in police circles.

On 6 June, the court granted interim bail to Chaudhry, but ordered the police to arrest his father.
