= NA-57 Rawalpindi-VI =

Constituency of the National Assembly of Pakistan

- Constituency for the National Assembly of Pakistan
- District: Rawalpindi city area of Rawalpindi District
- Province: Punjab
- Electorate: 431,511

Current constituency
- Party: Pakistan Muslim League (N)
- Member: Daniyal Chaudhary

NA-57 Rawalpindi-VI (این اے-57، راولپنڈی-6) is a constituency for the National Assembly of Pakistan.

== Members of Parliament ==
=== 2002–2018: NA-56 Rawalpindi-VII ===
Election	Member	Party
2002	Shaikh Rasheed Ahmad	Independent
2003 by-election	Muhammad Hanif Abbasi	MMA
2008	Muhammad Hanif Abbasi	PML-N
2013	Imran Khan	PTI

=== 2018–2023: NA-60 Rawalpindi-IV ===
Election	Member	Party
By-election 2018	Sheikh Rashid Shafique	PTI

=== 2024–present: NA-57 Rawalpindi-VI ===
Election	Member	Party
2024	Daniyal Chaudhary	PML-N

== Election 2002 ==
General elections were held on 10 October 2002. Sheikh Rasheed Ahmad an independent candidate won by 30,951 votes. All candidates that achieved over 1,000 votes are listed here.

General election 2002: NA-56 Rawalpindi-VII
Party	Candidate	Votes	%	±%
Independent	Sheikh Rasheed Ahmad	30,951	37.70	
PPP	Sardar Shoukat Hayat	19,888	24.23	
MMA	Dr. Muhammad Afzal Azaz	12,540	15.28	
PML(N)	Syed Zafar Ali Shah	11,441	13.94	
PML(Q)	Nilofar Bukhtiar	3,637	4.43	
PTI	Aamer Mahmood Kiani	3,182	3.88	
PST	Sajjad Haider Qadri	450	0.54	
Turnout		84,304	36.34	
Total valid votes		82,089	97.37	
Rejected ballots		2,215	2.63	
Majority		11,063	13.47	
Registered electors		231,962		

== By-Election 2003 ==
2003 by-election: NA-56 Rawalpindi-VII
Party	Candidate	Votes	%	±%
MMA	Muhammad Hanif Abbasi	31,919	57.80	
PML(Q)	Sheikh Rashid Shafiq	16,772	30.37	
PPP	Muhammad Yousaf Mirza	6,362	11.52	
Independent	Aamar Mahmood Kiani	139	0.25	
Independent	Malik Nasser Ahmed Khan	33	0.06	
Turnout		55,603	23.97	
Total valid votes		55,225	99.32	
Rejected ballots		378	0.68	
Majority		15,147	27.43	
Registered electors		231,962		

== Election 2008 ==
General elections were held on 18 Feb 2008. Muhammad Hanif Abbasi of PML-N won by 73,433 votes.

General election 2008: NA-56 Rawalpindi-VII
Party	Candidate	Votes	%	±%
PML(N)	Hanif Abbasi	73,433	68.23	
PPP	Sardar Shaukat Hayat Khan	22,720	21.11	
PML(Q)	Sheikh Rasheed Ahmad	10,964	10.19	
Others	Others (three candidates)	516	0.47	
Turnout		109,481	35.07	
Total valid votes		107,633	98.31	
Rejected ballots		1,848	1.69	
Majority		50,713	47.12	
Registered electors		312,220		
PML(N) gain from Independent				

== Election 2013 ==
General elections were held on 11 May 2013. Imran Khan won this seat with 80,577 votes

General election 2013: NA-56 Rawalpindi-VII
Party	Candidate	Votes	%	±%
PTI	Imran Khan	80,577	50.25	
PML(N)	Hanif Abbasi	67,221	41.92	
Others	Others (eighteen candidates)	12,565	7.83	
Turnout		161,842	56.11	
Total valid votes		160,363	99.09	
Rejected ballots		1,479	0.91	
Majority		13,356	8.33	
Registered electors		288,423		
PTI gain from PML(N)				

== Election 2018 ==
Elections were scheduled to be held in this constituency on 25 July as a part of the 2018 Pakistan general election. However, following the conviction of Pakistan Muslim League (N) candidate, Hanif Abbasi on 21 July, this election was postponed to an undisclosed date.

== By-election 2018 ==
By-elections were held in this constituency on 14 October 2018.

By-election 2018: NA-60 Rawalpindi-IV
Party	Candidate	Votes	%	±%
PTI	Sheikh Rashid Shafique	44,483	48.12	▼2.10
PML(N)	Sajjad Khan	43,836	47.42	▲5.48
Others	Others (six candidates)	4,131	4.46	
Turnout		92,962	25.98	▼30.06
Total valid votes		92,450	99.45	
Rejected ballots		512	0.55	
Majority		647	0.70	▼7.58
Registered electors		357,768		
PTI hold		Swing	▼3.79	

== Election 2024 ==
General elections were held on 8 February 2024. Daniyal Chaudhary won the election with 83,333 votes.

General election 2024: NA-57 Rawalpindi-VI
Party	Candidate	Votes	%	±%
PML(N)	Daniyal Chaudhary	83,333	46.47	▼0.95
PTI	Seemabia Tahir (Note: Filed nomination papers as PTI candidate but ECP allowed her to run as an independent)	56,803	31.68	▼16.44
JI	Mirza Khalid Mahmood	8,958	5.00	N/A
Suleman Khel Qabail Movement	Zia UI Haq	7,320	4.08	N/A
TLP	Ch Rizwan Younis	7,188	4.01	▲1.55
PPP	Mukhtar Abbas	3,724	2.08	N/A
AML	Sheikh Rashid Shafique	3,532	1.97	N/A
Others	Others (nineteen candidates)	8,450	4.71	
Turnout		182,340	42.26	▲16.28
Total valid votes		179,308	98.34	
Rejected ballots		3,122	1.66	
Majority		26,530	14.80	
Registered electors		431,511		
PML(N) gain from PTI				

== See also ==
- NA-56 Rawalpindi-V
- NA-58 Chakwal
