= Bhabra Bazaar =

Market in Rawalpindi, Pakistan

Bhabra Bazaar بھابڑا بازار
- Bazaar includes historic Haveli Sujan Singh and British-era neighbourhood with narrow streets
- Country: Pakistan
- Province: Punjab
- City: Rawalpindi

Bhabra Bazaar (Urdu: بھابڑا بازار) is an old historic bazaar with early 19th century houses, located in Rawalpindi, Pakistan.

Bhabra Bazaar has a commercial area that starts from Murree Road and extends to 'Sarafa Bazaar' within Bhabra Bazaar.

== Historical background ==
A food street and a historic haveli, Haveli Sujan Singh, built in 1893, is also situated in the bazaar. Sujan Singh was the uncle of famous Indian journalist and writer Khushwant Singh (2 February 1915 - 20 March 2014).

Bhabra Bazaar was founded by the followers of Jainism some centuries ago. "The word 'Bhabhra' derives from Sanskrit, indicating a merchant community belonging to Jain religion".

Old residential streets in Bhabra Bazaar area of Rawalpindi city have winding narrow streets, homes with handcrafted wooden doors and corridors leading to enclosed yards, within the four outside home walls. These British-era houses usually have either two or three stories with painted ceilings and ceramic tiles. Haveli Sujan Singh and its surrounding areas were considered upscale neighbourhoods back then.

Overhanging enclosed wooden balconies, called Jharokhas in local language, still survive today on some of the houses. Bhabhras (followers of Jain religion) used to be traders and goldsmiths by profession and could afford to build these somewhat expensive homes for themselves. In recent times, some specialty streets within the old Bhabra Bazaar area were renamed 'Sarafa Bazaar' (Goldsmiths Street) and Moti Bazaar.

According to historians, along with members of another tribe called Rawal, Jains also founded the city of Rawalpindi. After partition in 1947, followers of Jainism migrated to India along with Hindus and Sikhs.

== Food Street ==
Bhabra Bazaar also has a 'Food Street' that has the most authentic Punjabi cuisines – 'The Amritsari and Kashmiri kulchay, Punjabi dahi bhallay, Old Delhi chana chaat, the kheer and mithai (sweet desserts) of Ambala. In addition, it has several milk and yogurt shops in the food street.

== Prominent residents of Bhabra Bazaar ==
- Azhar Lodhi, former Pakistani television (PTV) newscaster and commentator
- Babar Awan, former Federal Minister and member of Senate of Pakistan
