= Haveli Sujan Singh =

Coordinates: 33°37′4.8″N 73°3′38.32″E

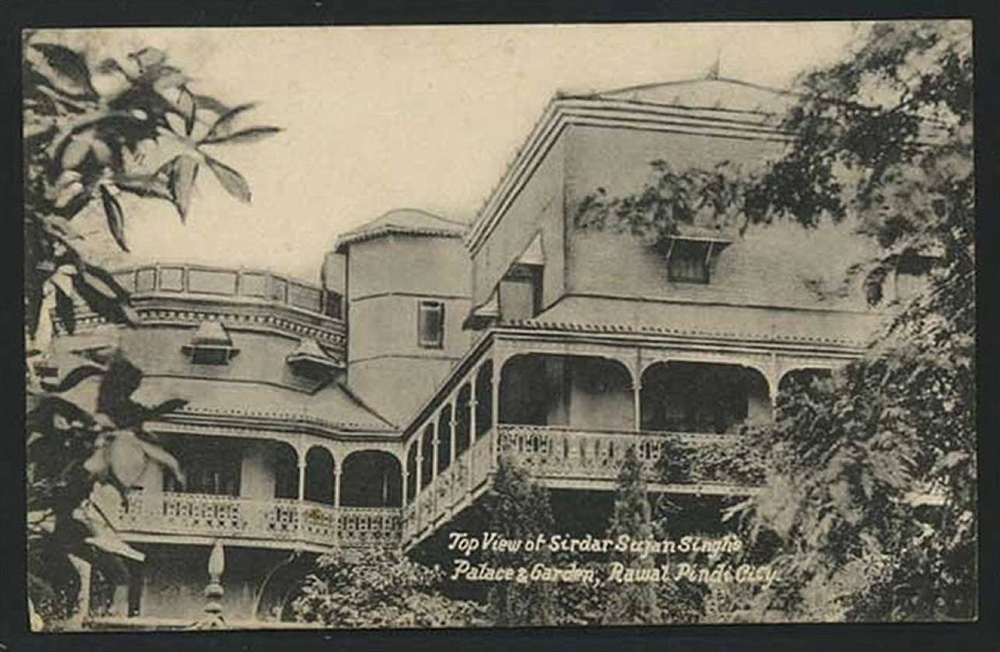
- Photograph of Sujan Singh Haveli in Rawalpindi from 1920
- Interactive map of the Haveli Sujan Singh area

General information
- Type: Mansion
- Architectural style: Sikh architecture with Mughal and British influences
- Location: Rawalpindi, Punjab, Pakistan
- Completed: Early 1890s
- Opened: 1893

Technical details
- Size: 24,000 sq.ft (2,230 sq. meters)
- Floor count: Four

Other information
- Number of rooms: Forty-five

Haveli Sujan Singh, also known as Sujan Singh Haveli, is a haveli located in the congested market of Bhabra Bazar Rawalpindi, Punjab, Pakistan.

== Construction and early history ==
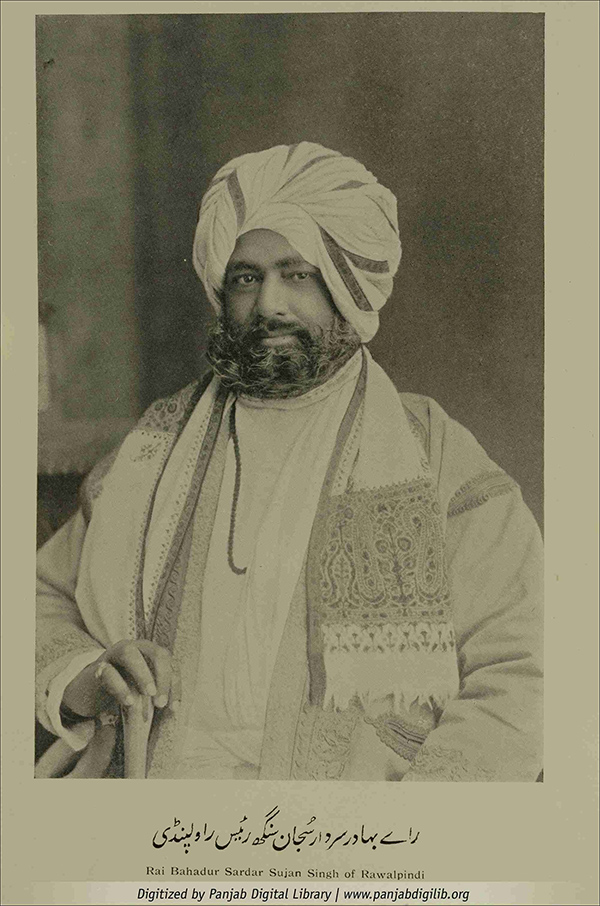
Photograph of Sujan Singh of Rawalpindi (died 1901)

It was built by a wealthy timber merchant and businessman of Rawalpindi, Rai Bahadur Sujan Singh, in 1893. Its constructor also built the Odeon cinema house and a library for the Rawalpindi cantonment. Another project constructed by Sujan Singh was Bagh Sardaraan (the garden of Sardars), a garden containing date palms, spires, servant quarters, and a gurdwara.

The haveli was built to resemble a royal palace with a majestic golden throne and bedrooms with original ivory furniture. In the various courtyards dancing peacocks were kept to dance during the evening and a pet tiger was kept which regularly walked the corridors. Musicians were given residence in the haveli who played during the evenings. An Aqueduct connected to 30 lines provided a reliable water supply. The mansion had two main wings connected by a bridge at the fourth floor. The mansion also served as a museum for the family of Rai Sujan Singh. It contained family pictures, antiques, Victorian furniture, China and the family silverware. The furniture came from Victorian England. The photos and paintings on the walls of the haveli depicted Sujan Singh’s family and ancestors, some of whom were said to have served in Maharaja Ranjit Singh’s durbar (court).

The family used the haveli as their personal residence until settling within the cantonment of Rawalpindi. They donated the former Sujan Singh Haveli to the government for usage by Sikh military officers. It is during its time under ownership of the British colonial government that two additional stories were added to the building in the first half of the 20th century to be used as lookout posts since they offered a panoramic view of Rawalpindi. The later residence of Sujan Singh's family after moving out of the haveli is now part of Fatima Jinnah Women’s University (FJWU).

== Architecture ==
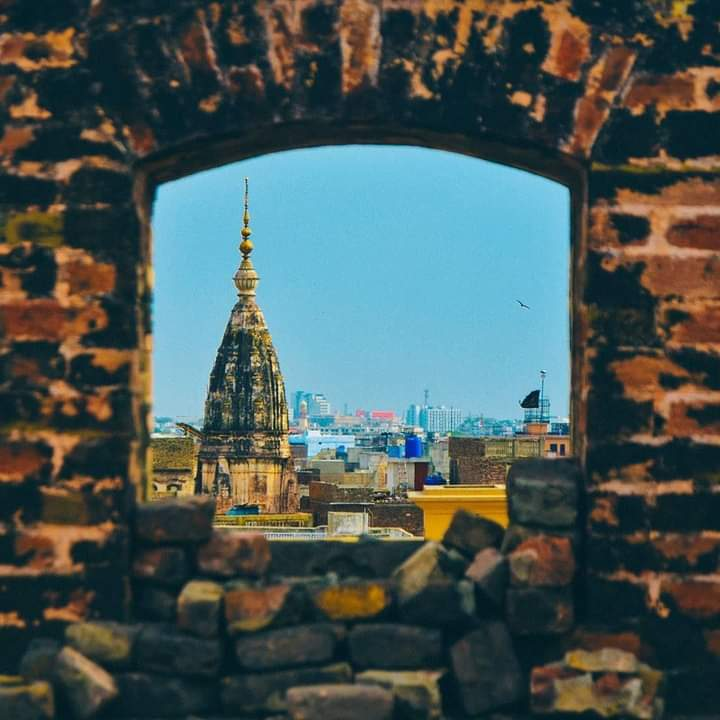
Window view from Haveli Sujan Singh in Rawalpindi

The haveli was constructed in the Sikh architectural style with Mughal and British motifs and influences. The enclosed area of the haveli was 24,000 sq.ft (2,230 sq. meters) which consisted of four stories with a total of 45 rooms. The rooms had large windows and were lit on evenings by large lamps and chandeliers. The embellishments and the wooden decoration of the haveli borrowed a lot from Central Asian and European architectures.

The main materials used in the building's foundation are brick and timber. The haveli reflects traditional building styles used by the prominent Jat Sikh families of that era. The timber used was local which could have been easily procured since the Singh family owned a prosperous timber business. Iron imported from Britain (but cast locally) was used in the construction of the ornate pillars and carvings on the doorways.

One of the most beautiful pieces of the mansion is the ornate and curved staircase from the ground floor up to the fourth floor. The ceilings of the first floor have ornately carved false wooden overlays. The pattern on the panels is clearly Central Asian and follows the same patterns as the used by many buildings of the prominent Sethi Mohallas in Peshawar. This adds weight to the argument that most prominent features of the buildings decoration are Central Asian.

The haveli also boasts carvings, verandas, and diyar tree woodwork.

The haveli had its own independent water supply that was connected to thirty lines leading toward the haveli.

== Post Partition ==
After independence the haveli gradually fell into ruin. The family of Sujan Singh had left for Delhi. The Bagh Sardaraan garden disappeared due to the construction of houses. One part of the haveli was completely destroyed with cave ins and cracked walls while the second part suffered from damaged foundation and nearly complete destruction of the elaborate wood panels. The Pakistani government settled Kashmiri refugees in the haveli who destroyed the artistic woodwork before being evacuated in 1980. There were rumours that the building would be handed over to scientist A.Q. Khan for establishing a science college for women, but the plan never materialised. Politician Sheikh Rasheed Ahmad gained the majority of share in the haveli and on 19 October 2006 he, the then federal minister from Rawalpindi, announced that the building would be converted into a campus for The Fatima Jinnah Women University, and its custody was handed over to the university.

== Restoration efforts ==
In early 2014, Fatima Jinnah Women University turned over the administration and upkeep of the historic haveli to the National College of Arts for a three-year period. NCA Director Dr Nadeem Omar Tarar commented on the takeover by NCA Rawalpindi camp and the decision to build a field school and a museum saying "We will survey the building first, and then we will move to establish a museum and a field school... As part of an institutional partnership, the three institutions signed an agreement a few days ago to establish a field school at the haveli to document and preserve the building as well as promote traditional arts by turning a part of it into a museum and learning centre for students from all three institutions."

== See also ==
- Bedi Mahal
