= Malik Shakeel Awan =

Pakistani politician (born 1966)

Malik Malik Shakeel Awan
- ملک شکیل احمد اعوان

Member of the National Assembly of Pakistan
- In office 2008–2013
- President: Mamnoon Hussain
- Prime Minister: Nawaz Sharif
- Preceded by: Sheikh Rasheed
- Constituency: NA-55 (Rawalpindi-VI)
- Majority: 73.08% (63,888 votes)

Personal details
- Born: 24 January 1966 (age 60) Rawalpindi, Punjab, Pakistan
- Other political affiliations: Pakistan Muslim League (N)
- Relations: Babar Awan (uncle)
- Education: The Capital School
- Alma mater: Gordon College
- Occupation: Politician; businessman

Malik Shakeel Awan (Urdu: ملک شکیل اعوان; born 25 January 1966) is a Pakistani politician and businessman who served as a member of the National Assembly of Pakistan from 2010 to 2013.

== Early life and education ==
Awan was born on 25 January 1966 in Rawalpindi, Punjab.

He received his early education at The Capital School and graduated from Gordon College. Shakeel was and remained Student Leader of Gordon College from 1986 to 1990.

== Political career ==
=== Early political career (1985–2002) ===
He started his political career in 1985 under the guidance of a senior PML(N) Leader, Khawaja Mehmood Ahmed Minto and renowned student leader Khawaja Saad Rafique.

He had previously served as a nazim of UC 46 Rawalpindi, from 1985 to 2002, Awan was also the parliamentary leader of PML(N) in the District Assembly of Rawalpindi.

=== Politically inactive years (2002–2010) ===
He ran for a seat on the Provincial Assembly of Punjab from constituency PP-12 (Rawalpindi-VII) as a candidate for PML-N in the 2002 Pakistani general election but was unsuccessful. He received 8,324 votes and lost the seat to Amar Fida Paracha of PPP.

Awan had not participated in the 2008 Pakistani general election, rather, he decided to later run as a candidate in the National Assembly of Pakistan, in the 2010 by-elections.

=== Candidate as a Member of the National Assembly of Pakistan (2010–2018) ===
He was elected to the National Assembly of Pakistan from Constituency NA-55 (Rawalpindi-VI) as a candidate of Pakistan Muslim League (N) in by-polls held in February 2010. He received 63,888 votes and defeated Sheikh Rasheed Ahmad.

He ran for the seat of the National Assembly from Constituency NA-55 (Rawalpindi-VI) as a candidate of PML-N in the 2013 Pakistani general election but was unsuccessful. He received 75,306 votes and lost the seat to Sheikh Rasheed Ahmad. Awan is also known for doing assiduous work for his constituency, without being a Member of The National Assembly of Pakistan.

=== Candidate as a Member of the Provincial Assembly of Punjab (2018–present) ===
He ran for the seat of the Provincial Assembly of the Punjab from constituency PP-18 (Rawalpindi- XIII) as a candidate of PML-N in the 2018 general election. He received 33,114 votes but was unsuccessful and lost the seat to Ejaz Khan by 10,907 votes. Reportedly, the election results were delayed for two hours and as of 18 September 2022 the results still remain disputed.

Afterwards, not only the Pakistan Muslim League Nawaz candidates and leaders but also the Pakistan People's Party's candidates and leaders claimed that their monitors in many voting centres had not received the official notifications of the precinct's results, but instead got hand-written tallies that they could not verify. "It is a sheer rigging. The way the people's mandate has blatantly been insulted, it is intolerable," Shehbaz Sharif told a news conference as the counting continued.

=== 2022 Election Campaign ===
He was appointed to campaign for Pakistan Muslim League Nawaz in the constituency of PP-7 Supplementary vote, after the Supreme Court of Pakistan had unseated 25 Members of the Provincial Assembly of Punjab from Pakistan Tehreek-e-Insaaf after they had switched Parties and had changed votes to Pakistan Muslim League (N) during the no-confidence motion against Imran Khan. Malik Shakeel Awan also led many rallies and as of 19 July, he was successful in his campaign and PMLN had won the seat in PP-7, being the only 2 seats who won.

The Opposition arose after the election results had been announced and had asked for a re-count. The Election Committee of Pakistan refused to their proposition and had given the statement that the results were indeed validated.

== Portfolios held ==
=== Current portfolios held ===
- Member of the Board of Directors, Rawalpindi Waste Management Company
- Provincial Co-Ordinator Punjab, Prime Minister Business Loan Scheme at PML(N)
- Senior Vice President Punjab PML-N Youth Wing
- Additional General Secretary Muslim League (N) Rawalpindi
- Member of the Central General Council of PML-N

=== Party portfolios held ===
- City President MSF, Rawalpindi (1986–1988)
- Student Leader Gordon College, Rawalpindi (1986–1990)
- Divisional president MSF, Rawalpindi (1988–1990)
- Divisional President Muslim League Youth Wing Rawalpindi (12 October 1999)
- District President Muslim League Youth Wing Rawalpindi (1990–1993)
- Worked as President of PP-3 Rawalpindi city PML(N) (1993–2002)
- Contested in the Provincial Assembly PP-12 election in the 2002 General elections and got remarkable votes

=== Public responsibilities held ===
- Elected Councilor (Municipal Corporation) in 1991
- Elected Councilor (Municipal Corporation) in 1998
