= Syed Sajjad Bokhari =

Pakistani politician

Senator Syed Sajjad Bokhari
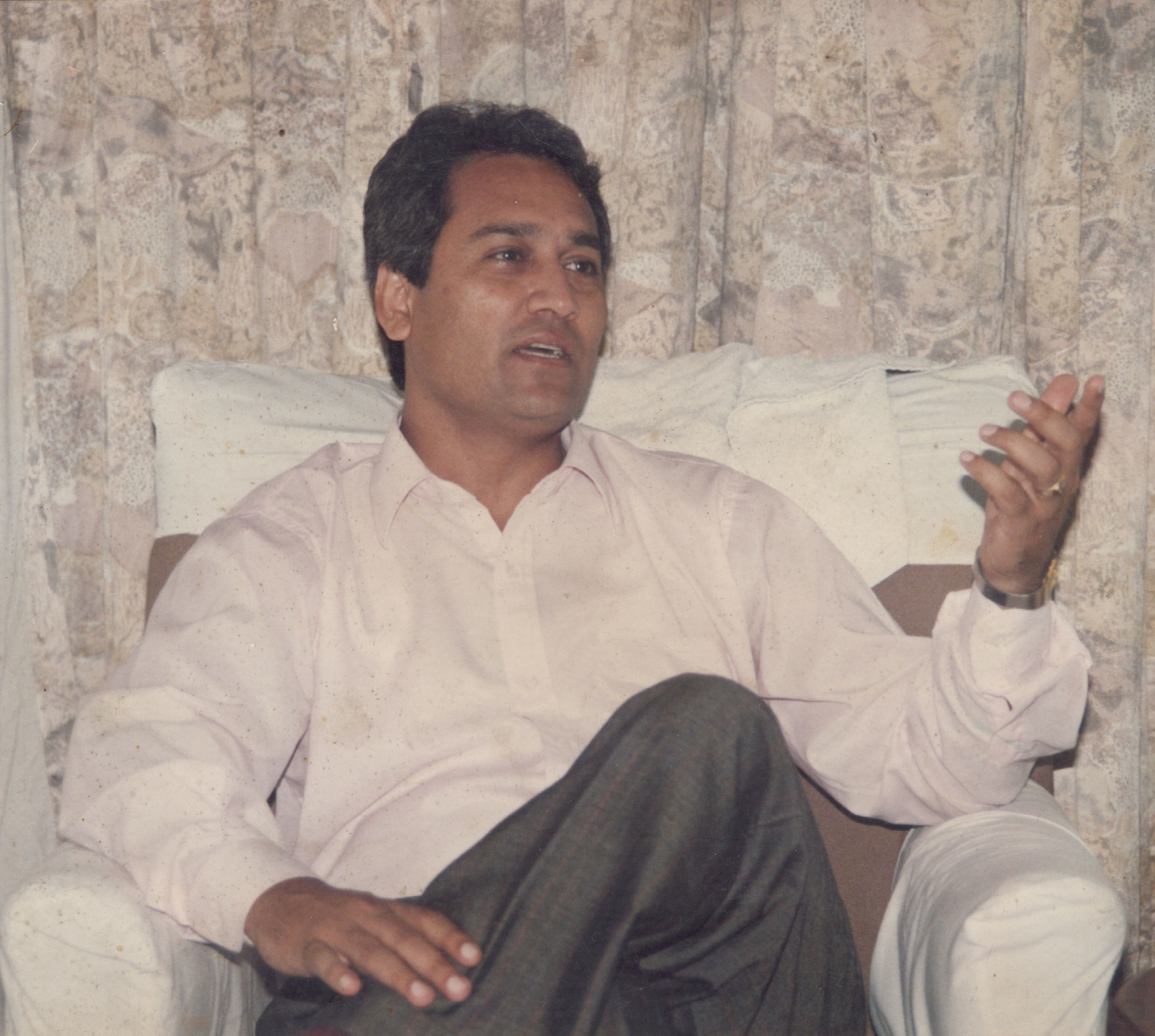

Member of Senate of Pakistan
- In office 12 March 2003 – 11 March 2006
- Parliamentary group: Pakistan Peoples Party – Parliamentarian

Personal details
- Born: Syed Sajjad Hussain Bokhari; 8 February 1955 (age 71) Bhalwal, Sargodha, Pakistan
- Spouse: Yasmeen Sajjad (m.1987)
- Children: 4
- Education: B.A. Political Science (Gold Medalist); M.A. French: Language & Literature; M.A. History; M.A. Political Science
- Alma mater: Government Gordon College; National University of Modern Languages; University of Punjab
- Occupation: Politician; author; businessman

Syed Sajjad Hussain Bokhari (Urdu: سید سجاد حسین بخاری) is a Pakistani politician, author and businessman.

A senior party official and Senator affiliated with Pakistan Peoples Party (PPP), he was a close aide of Benazir Bhutto, former Prime Minister of Pakistan, and served in various capacities under her leadership.

== Early life and education ==
Bokhari was born on 8 February 1955, in Bhalwal, District Sargodha, Punjab to a Syed family. After receiving his early education in his hometown, Bokhari moved to Rawalpindi, where he completed both his F.Sc (pre-medical) and B.A. in Political Science from Government Gordon College. He further holds three Masters: M.A. French, Language and Literature, from National University of Modern Languages (previously known as NIML and affiliated with Quaid-e-Azam University) in Islamabad, M.A. Political Science and M.A. History from University of Punjab in Lahore.

== Journalistic career ==
In 1992, Benazir Bhutto appointed Bokhari as the chief executive, editor-in-chief and printer/publisher of Daily Musawat (a newspaper founded by Zulfikar Ali Bhutto and closely affiliated with Pakistan Peoples Party). He was tasked with reviving the newspaper that had been banned during the martial law regime of Zia-ul-Haq and held that position until 2010, when it was handed over to Bilawal Bhutto Zardari.

Presently, Bokhari runs Daily Abtak, an independent Urdu daily newspaper. He is a member of the Executive Committee of the All Pakistan Newspapers Society (APNS) and a longstanding member of the Council of Pakistan Newspaper Editors (CPNE). He is also the Chairman of Pak Media Foundation, a not-for-profit institution for the welfare of journalists.

== Political career ==
He was the President of International Affairs (PPP) from 1992 till 2007, during which PPP transitioned from an observer party to a full member party at Socialist International – a global organization comprising 135 social democratic, socialist and labour parties seeking to establish democratic socialism. In 2003, Bokhari was elected as a Member of the Senate of Pakistan from Punjab. In 2006, he was appointed as the Chief Election Commissioner of the Party for its first intra-party polls, and as Deputy Secretary Information in the Central Executive Committee (CEC) of PPP (2006 - 2010).

== Writings ==
Bokhari has authored 21 books in the Urdu, English and French languages, contributing to the fields of history, politics and poetry. His notable works include national bestsellers such as Zulfikar Ali Bhutto, Wiladat se Shahadat tak, The Leader of Today, Pakistan kai 17 Wuzar-e-Azam and Mohtarma Benazir Bhutto Shaheed kai Akhri 72 Din, amongst others. He has also translated Benazir Bhutto's autobiography, Daughter of the East, to Urdu under the title Mashrik ki Beti. Bokhari is distinguished as the first Pakistani to author a book in French titled La Premiere Lueur, a collection of 29 short poems published in 1982, shortly after Bokhari completed his M.A. in French. The book was launched by the then Federal Minister for Education in Pakistan, Mr. Mohammad Ali Khan, as reported in Bokhari's autobiography, Bhalvāl se Aivān-i Bālā tak.
