= Hanif Abbasi =

Pakistani drug lord (born 1966)

Ministry of Railways (Pakistan)
- Incumbent
- Assumed office 7 March 2025
- President: Asif Ali Zardari
- Prime Minister: Shehbaz Sharif

Member of the National Assembly of Pakistan
- Incumbent
- Assumed office 29 February 2024
- Constituency: NA-56 Rawalpindi-V
- In office 18 November 2002 – 16 March 2013
- Constituency: NA-56 (Rawalpindi-VI)

Personal details
- Born: 4 January 1966 (age 60) Rawalpindi, Punjab, Pakistan
- Party: PMLN (2008-present)

Muhammad Hanif Abbasi (Urdu: محمد حنيف عباسى; born 4 January 1966) is a Pakistani politician of the Pakistan Muslim League (N). He was a member of the National Assembly of Pakistan and previously served in this position twice from 2002 to 2008 and again from 2008 to 2013.

== Early life and education ==
Abbasi was born on 4 January 1966 in a family of the Dhund Abbasi clan in Rawalpindi, Punjab, to Muhammad Khalil Abbasi, and he has five brothers and one sister.

Following his early education at the Muslim League High School in Lahore, where he was known for his interest in football and cricket, he later graduated from the Forman Christian College and University of the Punjab.

He has three children, one son, businessman settled in Dubai and politician Hammas Abbasi, and two daughters, including Dr Areeba Abbasi, who worked as a medical officer at Benazir Bhutto Hospital's emergency department before quitting in 2018, alleging political victimization.

== Political career ==
In 1977, while still a school student, Abbasi started his political activism.

He started his formal political career as a member of the Jamaat-e-Islami but later joined the Pakistan Muslim League (N) (PML-N) in 2008.

He was first elected as a member of the National Assembly of Pakistan from NA-56 (Rawalpindi VII) as a candidate of the Muttahida Majlis-e-Amal (MMA) and defeated Sheikh Rashid Ahmad's nephew Sheikh Rashid Shafique in the 2002 by-elections.

In the 2008 Pakistani general election, Abbasi joined the Pakistan Muslim League (N) (PML-N) and was again elected as a member of the National Assembly of Pakistan from NA-56 (Rawalpindi VII) on the ticket of the PML-N and defeated former Minister Sheikh Rashid Ahmad by bagging 73,433 votes.

In the 2013 Pakistani general election, he again contested the election from NA-56 (Rawalpindi VII) as a candidate of the PML-N and was defeated after getting 67,169 votes against Imran Khan who obtained 80,425 votes.

In the 2018 Pakistani general election, he was the nominated candidate from NA-60 (Rawalpindi-IV) on the ticket of the PML-N, however, he was disqualified and sentenced to life imprisonment in the narcotics case.

In April 2018, he was arrested in an ephedrine quota case by the anti-narcotics force and sentenced to prison for life by the court. However, on 11 April 2019, a bench comprising Justice Aalia Neelum of the Lahore High Court suspended the sentence, the court maintained all other accused in the case were acquitted and all legal points were not considered during the case.

=== Disqualification ===
An F.I.R. was registered against Abbasi in June 2012 for misuse of 500 k.g. of the controlled drug ephedrine obtained for his pharmaceutical company, Gray Pharmaceutical, in 2010. In November 2012, Abbasi was granted bail from the Lahore High Court (LHC) Rawalpindi bench, however, just before the 2013 ejection, the anti narcotics force submitted a challan to relook into the case before Abbasi could contest elections. However, Abbasi was allowed to contest elections in 2013, since his case was pending in the court. In July 2018, Justice Sardar Muhammad Akram announced the judgment, where Abbasi was found guilty in the narcotics case, imposing a Rs. 1 million fine and life imprisonment. He was arrested from the courts room and was shifted to Central Jail Rawalpindi. On 22 September 2018, a scandal surfaced when Abbasi's picture was released from jail in a casual dress instead of Jail apparel, with his party leadership and the Central Jail Adiala superintendent, after which he was shifted to Attock Jail from Central Jail Rawalpindi. Abbasi experienced bad health during his imprisonment, he reportedly had kidney problems. He was shifted to the Punjab Institute of Cardiology in January 2019 for cardiac procedures, and in March 2019 to Shaikh Zayed Hospital for his kidney and cardiac problems.

On 11 April 2019, a bench comprising Justice Aalia Neelum of the Lahore High Court suspended the sentence, the court maintained that all other accused in the case were acquitted and all legal points were not considered during the case.
