= PP-17 Rawalpindi-XI =

Constituency of the Provincial Assembly of Punjab, Pakistan

- Constituency for the Provincial Assembly of Punjab
- Region: Rawalpindi city area of Rawalpindi District

Current constituency
- Created from: PP-11 Rawalpindi-XI (2002-2018); PP-16 Rawalpindi-XI (2018-2023)

PP-17 Rawalpindi-XI (پی پی-17، راولپنڈى-11) is a Constituency of Provincial Assembly of Punjab.

== 2008—2013: PP-11 Rawalpindi-XI ==
Provincial election 2008: PP-11 Rawalpindi-XI
Party	Candidate	Votes	%	±%
PML(N)	Zia Ullah Shah	36,674	51.31	
PPP	Malik Khalid Nawaz Bobby	22,908	32.05	
PML(Q)	Raja Rashid Hafeez	11,578	16.20	
Independent	Raja Muhammad Ejaz	133	0.19	
Pakistan Aman Party	Mirza Zaheer Ahmed	107	0.15	
Independent	Tariq Sultan Joshi	35	0.05	
Independent	Shakeel Anwar Butt	22	0.03	
Independent	Mirza Mansoor Baig	19	0.03	
Turnout		72,769	40.07	
Total valid votes		71,476	98.22	
Rejected ballots		1,293	1.78	
Majority		13,766	19.26	
Registered electors		181,626		

== 2013—2018: PP-11 Rawalpindi-XI ==
General elections were held on 11 May 2013. Raja Rashid Hafeez won this seat with 44,430 votes.

Provincial election 2013: PP-11 Rawalpindi-XI
Party	Candidate	Votes	%	±%
PTI	Raja Rashid Hafeez	44,475	45.78	
PML(N)	Zia Ullah Shah	43,288	44.56	
PPP	Malik Khalid Nawaz	4,456	4.59	
JI	Syed Hassan Kaleem Gillani	1,566	1.61	
JUI (F)	Muhammad Zia Ur Rehman Amazai	1,303	1.34	
Others	Others (eleven candidates)	2,057	2.12	
Turnout		98,576	55.36	
Total valid votes		97,145	98.55	
Rejected ballots		1,431	1.45	
Majority		1,187	1.22	
Registered electors		178,065		

== 2018—2023 PP-16 Rawalpindi-XI ==
From 2018 PP-11 Rawalpindi-XI Become PP-16 Rawalpindi-XI With Some changes has follow (a) The following Census Charges of Rawalpindi City (1) Charge No.15 (2) Charge No.16 (3) Charge No.17 (4) Charge No.21 excluding Circle No. 1 and 2 (5) Charge No.22 (6) Charge No.24 and (7) Charge No.26 excluding Circle No. 1 and 2 of Rawalpindi District.

Provincial election 2018: PP-16 Rawalpindi-XI
Party	Candidate	Votes	%	±%
PTI	Raja Rashid Hafeez	64,695	53.04	
PML(N)	Arslan Hafeez	44,559	36.53	
TLP	Qazi Abdul Khabeer	4,684	3.84	
PPP	Ch. Iftikhar Ahmed	4,555	3.74	
MMA	Muhammad Hanif Ch.	2,556	2.10	
Others	Others (three candidates)	923	0.76	
Turnout		123,316	50.99	
Total valid votes		121,972	98.91	
Rejected ballots		1,344	1.09	
Majority		20,136	16.51	
Registered electors		241,842		

== General elections 2024 ==
Provincial election 2024: PP-17 Rawalpindi-XI
Party	Candidate	Votes	%	±%
PML(N)	Abdul Hanif	45,668	44.08	
Independent	Raja Rashid Hafeez (Note: Filed nomination papers as PTI candidate but ECP allowed him to run as an Independent)	38,392	37.06	
JI	Raza Ahmed Shah	9,226	8.91	
TLP	Adnan Akhtar Qureshi	3,335	3.22	
PPP	Raja Amir Karim	2,426	2.34	
Others	Others (twenty eight candidates)	4,545	4.39	
Turnout		105,392	41.15	
Total valid votes		103,592	98.29	
Rejected ballots		1,800	1.71	
Majority		7,276	7.02	
Registered electors		256,108		
hold				

== See also ==
- PP-16 Rawalpindi-X
- PP-18 Rawalpindi-XII
