= List of educational institutions in Rawalpindi =

This is a list of educational institutions in the district of Rawalpindi, Pakistan.

== Universities ==
Sr. No	University Name	Type	Location
1	University of Rawalpindi	Private	Main Grand Trunk Rd, near DHA-1, opposite High Court, Rawalpindi.
2	College of Electrical and Mechanical Engineering	Public	Peshawar road, Rawalpindi
3	Fatima Jinnah Women University	Public	The Mall, Kachari Chowk, Rawalpindi
4	Foundation University Islamabad	Semi Public	New Lalazar, Rawalpindi
5	Government Viqar-un-Nisa Women University	Public	Jehangir Rd, Sir Syed Colony, Rawalpindi
6	National College of Arts	Public	Liaqat Rd, Naya Mohalla, Rawalpindi
7	National University of Medical Sciences	Public	The Mall، Abid Majeed Rd, Rawalpindi
8	Pir Mehr Ali Shah Arid Agriculture University	Public	Shamsabad, Muree Road, Rawalpindi
9	Rawalpindi Medical University	Public	Tipu Rd, Chamanzar Colony, Rawalpindi
10	Rawalpindi Women University	Public	6th Rd, Satellite Town, Rawalpindi
11	National University of Modern Languages, Rawalpindi	Public	Khadim Hussain Rd, Lalazar, Rawalpindi

== Colleges ==
Sr. No	College Name	Type	Location
1	Leadership College of Commerce	Private	Multiple locations
2	Rawalpindi College of Commerce	Private	Multiple locations
3	Punjab College of Information Technology	Private	Multiple locations
4	Islamabad College of Management and Commerce	Private	Multiple locations
5	Rawal College of Commerce	Private	Multiple locations
6	Scholars Cantt College of Commerce	Private	Multiple locations
7	PACE College	Private	Multiple locations
8	Orient International Commerce College	Private	Multiple locations
9	Federal Science and Commerce College	Private	Multiple locations
10	Zawiya College	Private	Multiple locations
1	Super Wings College	Private	Multiple locations
12	Iqra College of Commerce and Computer Sciences	Private	Multiple locations
13	Jinnah Institute of Informatics & Commerce	Private	Multiple locations
14	Fatima Jinnah College of Commerce	Private	Multiple locations
15	Horizon College for Girls	Private	Multiple locations
16	Anam Degree College	Private	Multiple locations
17	Global College System	Private	Multiple locations
18	Zahoor-ul-Islam Girls Degree College	Private	Multiple locations
19	OPF-Girls College	Public	Multiple locations
20	Punjab College of Information Technology	Private	Multiple locations
21	Fatima Jinnah Degree College for Women	Private	Multiple locations
22	Mashaa Allah Girls College	Private	Multiple locations
23	Orient International Commerce College	Private	Multiple locations
24	Askari College	Private	Multiple locations
25	SKANS School of Accountancy	Private	Multiple locations
26	Civil College of Commerce	Private	Multiple locations
27	Hashmi College of Commerce	Private	Multiple locations
28	Rawalpindi Model College of Commerce	Private	Multiple locations
29	Punjab College of Excellence in Commerce	Private	Multiple locations
30	Islamabad College of Management and Commerce	Private	Multiple locations
31	NICON College of Computer and Management Sciences	Private	Multiple locations
32	Punjab College of Commerce	Private	Multiple locations
33	Little Oxford College of Commerce	Private	Multiple locations
34	Khyber Institute of Professional Skills	Private	Multiple locations
35	Indus College of Commerce	Private	Multiple locations
36	Rawalpindi College of Commerce	Private	Multiple locations
37	Fouji Foundation College	Private	Multiple locations
38	Republic College	Private	Multiple locations
39	Concepts College and Academy	Private	Multiple locations
40	FG. Sir Syed College	Public	Multiple locations
41	Chanab College of Science & Commerce	Private	Multiple locations
42	Military College of Signals	Public	Multiple locations
43	Government Post Graduate College	Public	Multiple locations
44	Govt Gordon College	Public	Multiple locations
45	Bilquis Education College For Women	Public	Multiple locations
46	Jinnah Islamia College Of Commerce	Private	Multiple locations
47	Sir Syed Science College	Private	Multiple locations
48	Muslim Law College	Private	Multiple locations
49	OPF Girls College	Public	Multiple locations
50	The Best Law College	Private	Multiple locations
51	Rawal College of Commerce	Private	Multiple locations
52	Fazaia Intermediate College	Public	Multiple locations
53	Government College of Technology	Public	Multiple locations
54	Modern College Of Commerce And Sciences	Private	Multiple locations
55	Kips College	Private	Multiple locations
