= Grammar Public School Rawalpindi =

School in Rawalpindi, Pakistan

Coordinates: 33.63220°N 73.06259°E

Grammar Public School Rawalpindi is a private English medium school located in Rawalpindi, Pakistan. Established by Abu Muhammad Rizvi, the institution provides education from primary levels through to Matriculation.

== Administration and Curriculum ==
The school currently operates under the administration of Sir Shamim Haider. It follows a curriculum that prepares students for the Board of Intermediate and Secondary Education (BISE) examinations. While the school utilizes Co-education at the primary level, classes are segregated for older students.

== See also ==
- List of schools in Rawalpindi
- Education in Pakistan

== Branches ==
Grammar Public School operates four branches across Rawalpindi:

- Boys Branch (Main Branch)
- Girls Branch
- Arts Branch (located in Chittian Hattian)
- Primary Branch

The school provides education up to the Matriculation level and follows an English medium curriculum. While the school is generally segregated, co-education is offered at the Primary level.
