= Daughters of Destiny =

Daughters of Destiny may refer to:

- Daughters of Destiny (film), a 1954 Franco-Italian co-production comedy drama film
- Daughters of Destiny (novel), a 1906 novel by L. Frank Baum
- Daughters of Destiny (TV series), a 2017 English-language Netflix documentary series

== See also ==
- Daughter of Destiny (disambiguation)
