= PP-16 Rawalpindi-X =

Constituency of the Provincial Assembly of Punjab, Pakistan

- Constituency for the Provincial Assembly of Punjab
- Region: Rawalpindi city area of Rawalpindi District

Current constituency
- Created from: PP-12 Rawalpindi-XII (2002-2018); PP-18 Rawalpindi-XIII (2018-2023)

PP-16 Rawalpindi-X (پی پی-16، راولپنڈى-10) is a Constituency of Provincial Assembly of Punjab.

== 2008—2013: PP-12 Rawalpindi-XII ==
Provincial election 2008 : PP-12 Rawalpindi-XII
Party	Candidate	Votes	%	±%
PML(N)	Sher Yar Riaz	31,591	52.60	
PPP	Zulfiqar Ahsan Malik	19,961	33.23	
PML(Q)	Zohaib Ali Khan Afridi	7,662	12.76	
Independent	Shaukat Hayat	847	1.41	
Turnout		61,135	40.14	
Total valid votes		60,061	98.24	
Rejected ballots		1,074	1.76	
Majority		11,630	19.37	
Registered electors		152,302		

== 2013—2018: PP-12 Rawalpindi-XII ==
General elections were held on 11 May 2013. Ijaz Khan won this seat with 35,836 votes.

Provincial election 2013 : PP-12 Rawalpindi-XII
Party	Candidate	Votes	%	±%
PTI	Ejaz Khan	35,836	44.59	
PML(N)	Sardar Muhammad Naseem Khan	34,034	42.35	
PPP	Babar Sultan Jadoon	7,355	9.15	
JI	Muhammad Hanif Chaudhry	2,411	3.00	
Others	Others (ten candidates)	727	0.91	
Turnout		81,421	55.78	
Total valid votes		80,363	98.70	
Rejected ballots		1,058	1.30	
Majority		1,802	2.24	
Registered electors		145,957		

== 2018—2023 PP-18 Rawalpindi-XIII ==
From 2018 PP-13 Rawalpindi-XIII Become PP-18 Rawalpindi-XIII With Some changes has follow The following Census Charges of Rawalpindi City (1) Charge No.11 (2) Charge No.12 (3) Charge No.13 (4) Charge No.14 and (5) Charge No.23 of Rawalpindi District.

General elections are scheduled to be held on 25 July 2018.

Provincial election 2018: PP-18 Rawalpindi-XIII
Party	Candidate	Votes	%	±%
PTI	Ejaz Khan	44,054	43.93	
PML(N)	Malik Shakeel Ahmed Awan	33,129	33.03	
PPP	Babar Sultan Jadoon	10,202	10.17	
TLP	Muhammad Shafiq	8,532	8.51	
MMA	Muhammad Zia Ur Rehman Amazai	3,566	3.56	
Others	Others (two candidates)	810	0.81	
Turnout		101,823	52.28	
Total valid votes		100,293	98.50	
Rejected ballots		1,530	1.50	
Majority		10,925	10.90	
Registered electors		194,767		

== General elections 2024 ==
Provincial election 2024: PP-16 Rawalpindi-X
Party	Candidate	Votes	%	±%
PML(N)	Zia Ullah Shah	45,929	41.90	
Independent	Ijaz Khan (Note: Filed nomination papers as PTI candidate but ECP allowed him to run as an Independent)	36,403	33.21	
PPP	Aamir Fida Paracha	7,440	6.79	
TLP	Muhammad Shafiq	7,052	6.43	
JI	Syed Zafar Mehmood	3,415	3.12	
AML	Zoahiab Ali Khan Afridi	2,342	2.14	
Others	Others (twenty one candidates)	6,957	6.41	
Turnout		111,879	41.80	
Total valid votes		109,628	97.99	
Rejected ballots		2,251	2.01	
Majority		9,526	8.69	
Registered electors		267,625		
hold				

== See also ==
- PP-15 Rawalpindi-IX
- PP-17 Rawalpindi-XI
