= Viqarunnisa =

Viqarunnisa or Viqar-un-Nisa may refer to:

- Viqarunnisa Noon School and College, an all-girls secondary school and college in Dhaka, Bangladesh
- Government Viqar-un-Nisa Women University, a public women's university in Rawalpindi, Punjab, Pakistan
- Viqar-un-Nisa Noon (1920–2000), Austrian-Pakistani social worker and wife of the 7th Prime Minister of Pakistan, Feroz Khan Noon
