= Seemabia Tahir =

Pakistani politician

Member of the Provincial Assembly of the Punjab
- In office 15 August 2018 – 14 January 2023
- Constituency: Reserved seat for women

Personal details
- Party: PTI (2018-present)

Seemabia Tahir is a Pakistani politician who had been a Member of the Provincial Assembly of the Punjab from August 2018 to January 2023.

== Biography ==
She was born on 23 May 1976 in Rawalpindi, Pakistan. In 2003, she earned Master of Education degree from Al-Khair University in Rawalpindi.

She was elected to the Provincial Assembly of the Punjab as a candidate of Pakistan Tehreek-e-Insaf (PTI) on a reserved seat for women in the 2018 Pakistani general election.

She ran for the seat of the National Assembly of Pakistan from Constituency NA-57 Rawalpindi-VI as a candidate of PTI in the 2024 Pakistani general election but was unsuccessful. She received 56,789 votes, losing to a candidate of Pakistan Muslim League (N), Danyal Chaudhry, who garnered 83,331 votes.
