= NA-56 Rawalpindi-V =

Constituency of the National Assembly of Pakistan

- Constituency for the National Assembly of Pakistan
- Region: Rawalpindi city area of Rawalpindi District
- Electorate: 523,733

Current constituency
- Party: Pakistan Muslim League (N)
- Member: Hanif Abbasi
- Created from: NA-55 Rawalpindi-VI

NA-56 Rawalpindi-V (این اے-56، راولپنڈی-5) is a constituency for the National Assembly of Pakistan.

== Members of Parliament ==
=== 1970–1977: (NW-28 Rawalpindi-III) ===
Election	Member	Party
1970	Habib Ahmad	PPP

=== 1977–2002: NA-38 (Rawalpindi-III) ===
Election	Member	Party
1977	Syed Ali Asghar Shah	PPP
1985	Shaikh Rasheed Ahmad	Independent
1988	Shaikh Rasheed Ahmad	IJI
1990	Shaikh Rasheed Ahmad	IJI
1993	Shaikh Rasheed Ahmad	PML-N
1997	Shaikh Rasheed Ahmad	PML-N

=== 2002–2018: NA-55 (Rawalpindi-VI) ===
Election	Member	Party
2002	Shaikh Rasheed Ahmad	Independent
2008	Makhdoom Muhammad Javed Hashmi	PML-N
2008 by-election	Pervaiz Khan	PML-N
2010 by-election	Malik Shakeel Awan	PML-N
2013	Sheikh Rasheed Ahmad	AML

=== 2018–2023: NA-62 (Rawalpindi-VI) ===
Election	Member	Party
2018	Sheikh Rasheed Ahmad	AML

=== 2024–present: NA-56 Rawalpindi-V ===
Election	Member	Party
2024	Hanif Abbasi	PML-N

== Election 2002 ==
General elections were held on 10 October 2002. Sheikh Rasheed Ahmad an independent candidate won by 40,649 votes.

General election 2002: NA-55 Rawalpindi-VI
Party	Candidate	Votes	%	±%
Independent	Sheikh Rasheed Ahmad	40,649	42.05	
PPP	Agha Riaz-Ul-lsIam	28,885	29.88	
PML(N)	Sardar Muhammad Tariq	14,405	14.90	
MMA	Tariq Munir Butt	12,297	12.72	
Others	Others (two candidates)	423	0.45	
Turnout		98,833	38.77	
Total valid votes		96,659	97.80	
Rejected ballots		2,174	2.20	
Majority		11,764	12.17	
Registered electors		254,943		

== Election 2008 ==
The result of general election 2008 in this constituency is given below.

=== Result ===
Javed Hashmi succeeded in the election 2008 and became the member of National Assembly.

General election 2008: NA-55 Rawalpindi-VI
Party	Candidate	Votes	%	±%
PML(N)	Javed Hashmi	76,980	58.46	
PPP	Malik Aamer Fida Paracha	37,397	28.40	
PML(Q)	Sheikh Rasheed Ahmad	15,780	11.98	
Others	Others (five candidates)	1,519	1.16	
Turnout		133,955	40.12	
Total valid votes		131,676	98.30	
Rejected ballots		2,279	1.70	
Majority		39,583	30.06	
Registered electors		333,928		
PML(N) gain from Independent				

== By-election 2008 ==
By-election 2008: NA-55 Rawalpindi-VI
Party	Candidate	Votes	%	±%
PML(N)	Pervaiz Khan	25,237	65.00	
Independent	Ijaz Khan Jazi	12,205	31.44	
Others	Others (sixteen candidates)	1,383	3.56	
Turnout		39,035	11.69	
Total valid votes		38,825	99.46	
Rejected ballots		210	0.54	
Majority		13,032	33.56	
Registered electors		333,928		
PML(N) hold				

== By-election 2010 ==
The by-polls were held in February 2010 and Malik Shakeel Awan was elected to the National Assembly of Pakistan from this constituency as a candidate of Pakistan Muslim League (N) (PML-N). He received 63,888 votes and defeated Sheikh Rasheed Ahmad by a great margin.

By-election 2010: NA-55 Rawalpindi-VI
Party	Candidate	Votes	%	±%
PML(N)	Malik Shakeel Awan	63,888	53.96	
AML	Shiekh Rasheed Ahmed	42,530	35.92	
Independent	Barrister Shaikh Danish Iftikhar	5,020	4.24	
Independent	Dr. Muhammad Kamal	3,109	2.63	
PTI	Ijaz Khan Jazi	3,105	2.62	
Others	Others (sixteen candidates)	743	0.63	
Turnout		119,408	35.77	
Total valid votes		118,395	99.15	
Rejected ballots		1,013	0.85	
Majority		21,358	18.04	
Registered electors		333,872		
PML(N) hold				

== Election 2013 ==
General elections were held on 11 May 2013. Sheikh Rasheed Ahmad of Awami Muslim League won by 95,643 votes and became the member of National Assembly.

General election 2013: NA-55 Rawalpindi-VI
Party	Candidate	Votes	%	±%
AML	Sheikh Rasheed Ahmad	88,627	49.98	
PML(N)	Malik Shakeel Ahmed Awan	75,306	42.46	
Others	Others (twenty one candidates)	13,408	7.56	
Turnout		179,865	55.51	
Total valid votes		177,341	98.60	
Rejected ballots		2,524	1.40	
Majority		13,321	7.52	
Registered electors		324,022		
AML gain from PML(N)				

== Election 2018 ==
General elections were held on 25 July 2018.

General election 2018: NA-62 Rawalpindi-VI
Party	Candidate	Votes	%	±%
AML	Sheikh Rasheed Ahmad	119,362	49.97	
PML(N)	Daniyal Chaudhary	91,879	38.76	
Others	Others (ten candidates)	22,660	9.62	
Turnout		235,560	52.01	
Rejected ballots		3,869	1.65	
Majority		26,407	11.21	
Registered electors		452,930		
AML hold		Swing	N/A	

== Election 2024 ==
General elections were held on 8 February 2024. Hanif Abbasi won the election with 96,655 votes.

General election 2024: NA-56 Rawalpindi-V
Party	Candidate	Votes	%	±%
PML(N)	Hanif Abbasi	96,655	44.95	▲6.19
PTI	Shehryar Riaz (Note: Filed nomination papers as PTI candidate but ECP allowed him to run as an independent)	82,619	38.43	N/A
TLP	Sajjad Akbar Abbasi	9,432	4.39	▲0.56
JI	Imran Shafique	7,467	3.47	
AML	Sheikh Rasheed Ahmad	5,727	2.66	▼47.31
Others	Others (twenty-five candidates)	13,108	6.10	
Turnout		219,167	41.85	▼10.16
Total valid votes		215,008	98.10	
Rejected ballots		4,159	1.90	
Majority		14,036	6.53	
Registered electors		523,733		
PML(N) gain from AML				

== See also ==
- NA-55 Rawalpindi-IV
- NA-57 Rawalpindi-VI
