= Reconciliation: Islam, Democracy, and the West =

2008 book by Benazir Bhutto

- Author: Benazir Bhutto
- Language: English
- Genre: Political science
- Publisher: HarperCollins
- Publication date: 15 February 2008
- Publication place: United States
- Pages: 336
- ISBN: 9780061809569
- Preceded by: Daughter of Destiny: An Autobiography

Reconciliation: Islam, Democracy, and the West is a 2008 book by Benazir Bhutto. The book was published after her assassination.

== Background ==
At the time of Bhutto's death, the manuscript for her last book, to be called Reconciliation: Islam, Democracy and the West, had been received by HarperCollins. Mark Seigel had helped Bhutto to research to write this book and he said that Bhutto had been troubled by the way that extremists had hijacked the message of Islam. So she wanted him to compile all the assertions of extremist clerics and terrorists on democracy, pluralism, tolerance and then asked him confer with Islamic scholars and compile the Quranic references to the same subjects and line them out in an array, almost a spreadsheet, against the extremists. The book was published in February 2008.

== Content ==
In Reconciliation, Bhutto recounts her final months in Pakistan and considers how to stem the tide of Islamic radicalism and to rediscover the values of tolerance and justice that she said lie at the heart of her religion. In the book Bhutto argued that democracy and Islam are completely compatible and the reason behind terrorism is not Islam but politics.

== Reception ==
The book received positive to mixed reviews from critics and praise from politicians including Nancy Pelosi and Ted Kennedy.

=== Positive review ===
Fareed Zakaria wrote a positive review of the book in The New York Times, stating: "It is a book of enormous intelligence, courage and clarity. It contains the best-written and most persuasive modern interpretation of Islam I have read. Part of what makes it compelling, of course, is the identity of its author."

Nancy Pelosi praised the book:

This book is an eloquent reflection of traits which defined the life of Benazir Bhutto—an unshakable optimism about the future, a firm belief in the power of dialogue, and a commitment to democracy.The strength of her message of hope underscores how much was lost in her tragic death.

Washington Post published a review by Pamela Constable, noting: "A poised public figure given to flowery speeches and cagey ambiguity, Bhutto wrote the book with uncharacteristic bluntness, suggesting an awareness that both she and her country had little time left. Pointing fingers and naming names—especially those of several chiefs of Pakistan's powerful intelligence service—she blamed a combination of autocratic rulers, manipulative religious leaders and meddling Western governments for sabotaging democracy's chances in Pakistan and other parts of the Muslim world, and for pushing Islam in ever more radical directions."

The Economist published a review stating: "Reconciliation seeks to resolve two historic clashes unfolding in the world today: one within her religion, Islam, and the other between Islam and the West. It is a noble if Utopian aim. Bhutto was nothing if not ambitious."

The Daily Telegraph published a review by Simon Scott Plummer noting: "Despite these shortcomings, Bhutto has made an authoritative contribution to a debate for which, on 27 December, she paid with her life. In an afterword, her family describes her as 'the fanatics' worst nightmare'. That is no bad epitaph."

=== Mixed review ===
Author Kamila Shamsie published a mixed review in The Guardian, writing: "One of the most telling omissions is her refusal to acknowledge that she was prime minister from 1994 to 1996 while the Taliban, with support from Pakistan, were extending their control through Afghanistan. Instead, she only mentions that the Taliban took Kabul right after the fall of her government in 1996—neatly placing all the blame for Pakistan's Taliban policy on her successor, Nawaz Sharif." But she praised Bhutto's thought.

The New York Times published a review by Michiko Kakutani, who wrote: "If Ms. Bhutto’s own life reads like a Greek tragedy, she was nonetheless a very modern politician, and the book she has written is part manifesto, part spin job, part selective history and part term-paper analysis."

The Independent published a mixed review by Aamer Hussein, who wrote: "Though her apologia for the chronic flaws of her regime is perhaps the weakest part of her book, much of it is evidence that this brave woman, had she lived, may yet have put into practice some of her beliefs."

=== Negative review ===
The Times published a review by Patrick French, who described the book as "odd" and "strange" and said that Bhutto had disputed history of Pakistan in the book. He wrote "The history of Pakistan that follows is like something out of a primary-school textbook, crossed with a party political broadcast. The achievements of the Bhutto family are exaggerated and lauded and their mistakes and hypocrisies are ignored. Benazir's grandfather, Sir Shah Nawaz Bhutto, a feudal landowner and a pro-British politician of no great importance, is presented as a seminal figure in the creation of Pakistan in 1947. Benazir's own backing of the Taliban is blamed on her successor, Nawaz Sharif."

Sameer Rahim published a review in The Daily Telegraph noting that "In Reconciliation, Bhutto claims to be a 'symbol of democracy'. But the way she remained convinced of her own sincerity is more reminiscent of Tony Soprano than Aung San Suu Kyi".
