= Daughter of Destiny =

Daughter of Destiny may refer to:

- Alraune (1928 film) or A Daughter of Destiny, a 1928 German silent science fiction horror film
- Daughter of Destiny (1917 film), a lost 1917 silent film drama
- Daughter of Destiny: An Autobiography, autobiography of Benazir Bhutto
