= PP-13 Rawalpindi-VIII =

Constituency of the Provincial Assembly of Punjab, Pakistan

- Former constituency for the Provincial Assembly of Punjab
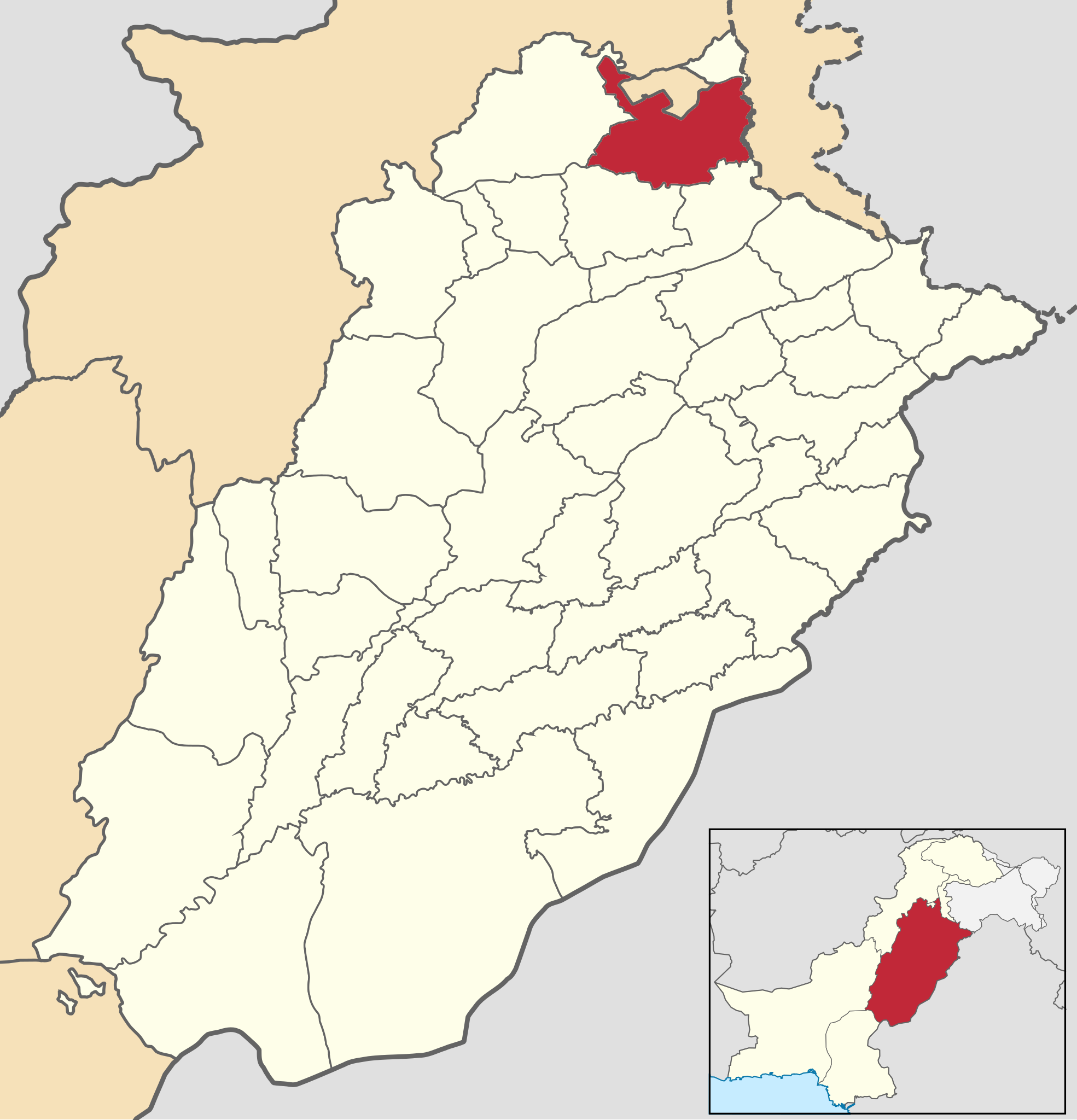
- Region: Rawalpindi City (Partly) Rawalpindi District

Former constituency
- Created: 2018
- Abolished: 2023
- Created from: PP-6 Rawalpindi-VI (2002–2018); PP-11 Rawalpindi-VI (2018–2023)
- Replaced by: PP-11 Rawalpindi-V

PP-13 Rawalpindi-VIII (پی پی-13، راولپنڈى-8) was a Constituency of Provincial Assembly of Punjab. This constituency was created after Rawalpindi District gained 1 seat after 2018 Delimitations. After 2023 Delimitations The constituency was abolished after Rawalpindi lost 1 seat.

== 2018 Elections ==
From 2018 some areas of PP-6 Rawalpindi-VIII Become PP-13 Rawalpindi-VIII With Some changes has follow (a) Gorakh Pur Qanungo Halqas of Rawalpindi Tehsil (b)The following Qanungo Halqas of Chaklala Cantonment (1) Charge No.4,(2) Morgah (3) Kotha Kalan (4) Topi and (5) Chaklala-I of Rawalpindi District.

General elections are scheduled to be held on 25 July 2018.

Provincial election 2018: PP-13 Rawalpindi-VIII
Party	Candidate	Votes	%	±%
PTI	Amjad Mehmood Chaudhry	39,943	57.50	
PML(N)	Chaudhry Sarfraz Afzal	12,512	18.04	
Independent	Dad Khan	5,443	7.84	
MMA	Muhammad Taj Abbasi	5,434	7.82	
TLP	Ch Rizwan Younas	4,987	7.18	
Others	Others (five candidates)	1,152	1.65	
Turnout		71,381	53.64	
Total valid votes		69,471	97.32	
Rejected ballots		1,910	2.68	
Majority		27,431	39.49	
Registered electors		133,076		

== See also ==
- PP-12 Rawalpindi-VII
- PP-14 Rawalpindi-IX
