= Government Gordon College =

College in Rawalpindi, Pakistan

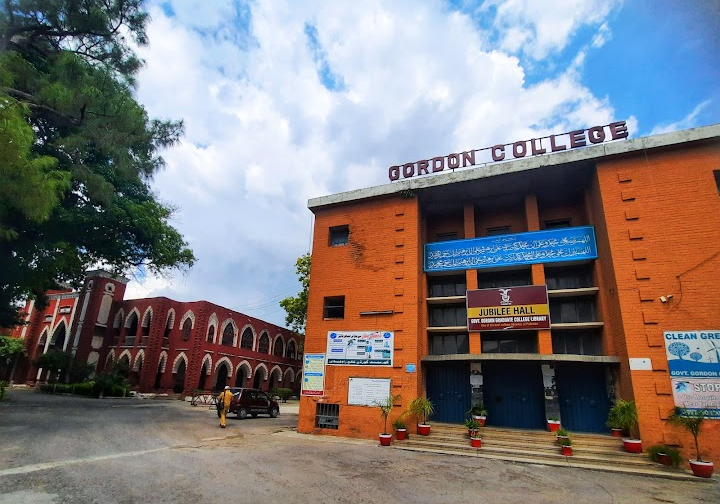
- Motto: "Seek and We Shall Find"
- Established: 1893; 133 years ago
- Principal: Prof. Dr. Muhammad Idrees
- Location: Rawalpindi, Punjab, Pakistan; 33°36′33″N 73°03′44″E

Government Gordon College, Rawalpindi is a government college in Rawalpindi, Punjab, Pakistan, that was established as a church school in 1893. The college is named after Andrew Gordon.

The college year is made up of an annual system: examination are held once every year. Enrollment at Gordon College is in thousands of students, with around hundreds living on campus. The campus has many buildings, which include a large stadium (used for hockey, football and cricket), basketball court, tennis courts, and badminton court. The college has a large and historic auditorium. The college includes a great library with thousands of new and old books, which also includes a shelf where all books are gifted from the American Embassy, besides this, it also has an old museum prototype. Now with new reforms, this college developed its BS education level and made it co-education which can serve for both males and females.

== History ==
The history of Gordon College can be traced to 1856 when Christian Grammar High School was established in Raja Bazar near the present campus. The college chapter of the school was opened in 1893 with 14 students as class I. There were six subjects offered at intermediate college: History, Philosophy, Mathematics, English, Persian, and Sanskrit.

In 1893, it was converted into a college and was named after the American Presbyterian Mission head, Andrew Gordon. Initially, it was affiliated with the Calcutta University in British India.

After the partition of India in 1947, it was outside the city area; with increasing population, the college is now surrounded by commercial and official buildings. It is a mix of old and new style buildings and has lost some of its academic claims in the years since it became a state institution. Originally, it was founded as a private, Christian-affiliated institution and was the only college functioning in the city of Rawalpindi.

It has a long history and one professor and principal who best represents that history: Ralph Randles Stewart joined the Gordon College, Rawalpindi in 1911 to teach elementary Botany and Zoology to pre-medical students. He served as a professor in Botany (1917 – 1960) and as principal of the college from 1934 to 1954.

In 1972, the college was nationalized by the government and administration was taken from the church and subsequently was converted into a government college.

== Courses ==
Gordon College is one of the oldest academic institutions in Pakistan. It offers education services starting from initial college level studies (11th grade in Pakistan) to the master's degree level.

Degrees are offered in the Sciences and Humanities. Three level of degrees are offered:

- Intermediate (11th and 12th grades, leading to F.Sc, F.A, ICS and also offers other courses with different combinations)
- Bachelor (Gordon College has the honor that it is the only public sector or government college in the upper Punjab Potohar region to offer a four-year BS program. The college offers BS in Botany, Mathematics, Information Technology, Economics, Physics, Chemistry, Political Science, Psychology, Statistics and English.)
- Master's (Currently, Masters in English, Psychology and Political Science is offered.)

Computer Science Education and diploma courses are also offered.

== Notable alumni ==
- Rana Mubashir, Pakistani journalist/writer/talk show host/political analyst.
- Arshad Sharif, Pakistani journalist.
- Azra Quraishi, notable Pakistani botanist and educator.
- Jagan Nath Azad
- Shaukat Aziz, former Prime Minister of Pakistan.
- Malik Shakeel Awan, member of National Assembly of Pakistan.
- Arshad Nawaz Chaudhry, Professor at Pir Mehr Ali Shah Arid Agriculture University.
- Sardar Sikandar Hayat Khan, former President and Prime Minister of Azad Kashmir.
- Shaikh Rasheed Ahmad, politician and former Federal Minister of Pakistan.
- Syed Sajjad Bokhari, Member of Senate of Pakistan.
- Lieutenant General Zorawar Chand Bakhshi, retired soldier of the Indian Army, has the distinction of being "India's most decorated General".
- Rahat Kazmi, actor, intellectual, compere.
- Pervez Khattak, former Chief Minister of KPK.
- Pervez Rashid, Information Minister of Pakistan and Senior Leader of Pakistan Muslim League (N)
- Shamsur Rahman Kallu, Lieutenant General, DG Inter Services Intelligence.
- Jehangir Karamat, General, Chief of Army Staff, Chairman of the Joint Chiefs of Staff Committee, Pakistan Armed Forces
- Tariq Mehmood, Brigadier Tariq Mehmood SJ and Bar, Brig TM, Tiger of SSG
- Qamar Javed Bajwa, General, Chief of Army Staff, Pakistan Armed Forces
- Khalil-ur-Rehman Ramday, former Judge of the Supreme Court of Pakistan
- Fateh Muhammad Malik, literary critic, linguist and a scholar
- Jamshed Gulzar Kiani, Lieutenant General, Chairman of the Federal Public Service Commission
- Raja Saroop Khan, Lieutenant General, Governor of Punjab from 1995 to 1996
- Azhar Lodhi, newscaster and commentator at the Pakistan Television Corporation (PTV)
- Ismail Gulgee, notable painter artist of Pakistan
- Shyam, Indian Hindi film actor
- Balraj Sahni, Indian film and stage actor
- Master Tara Singh, veteran Indian politician

== See also ==
- Islamabad College for Boys
- Ralph Randles Stewart
