= Azhar Lodhi =

Pakistani television newscaster

- اظہر لودھی
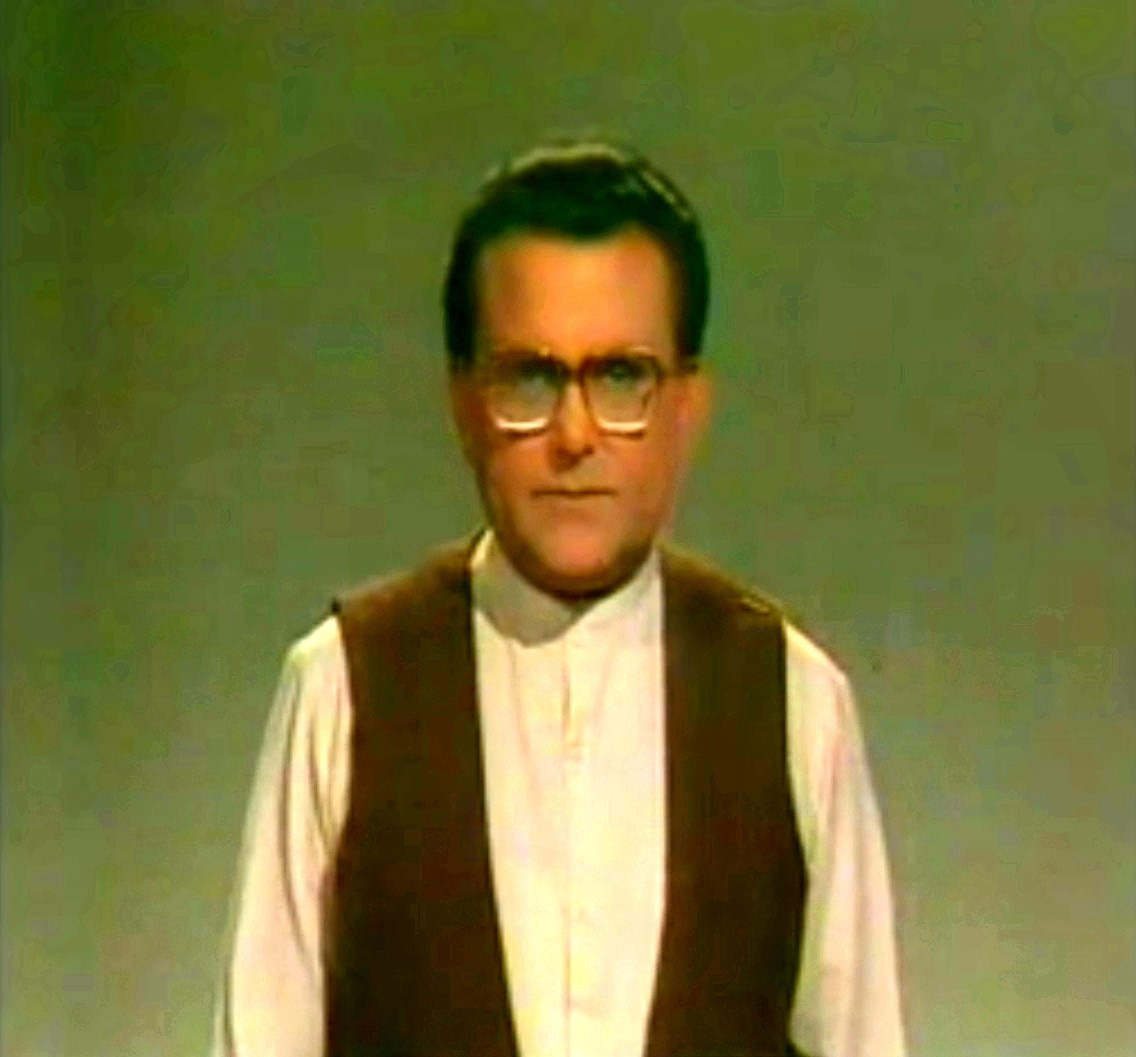
- A picture of Azhar Lodhi on PTV in the 1980s
- Born: Jalandhar, British India
- Education: Government Gordon College, Rawalpindi
- Occupation: TV Newscaster
- Years active: 1966 - 1988
- Television: Pakistan Television
- Awards: Pride of Performance Award by the President of Pakistan (1986)

Azhar Lodhi is a Pakistani former newscaster and commentator who worked at the Pakistan Television primarily during 1966–1988.

== Life and career ==
Lodhi was born in Jalandhar, British India. Later, his family migrated to Pakistan and settled in Rawalpindi. He graduated from Government Gordon College, Rawalpindi. Then Lodhi first worked for Radio Pakistan, and later, starting in 1966, for PTV as a newscaster.

According to a Gallup survey held in 1986, he was the second most famous newscaster on PTV, behind Khalid Hameed.

He was removed from PTV after he sentimentally covered the funeral procession of the late president General Muhammad Zia-ul-Haq. He was widely considered in Pakistan to have pro-Zia views and a pro-Zia bias.

== Awards and recognition ==
Year	Award	Category	Result	Ref.
1986	Pride of Performance	Arts	Won	
1989	Nigar Award	Best newscaster	Won	
