= PP-11 Rawalpindi-V =

Constituency of the Provincial Assembly of Punjab, Pakistan

- Constituency for the Provincial Assembly of Punjab
- Region: Rawalpindi city area of Rawalpindi District

Current constituency
- Created from: PP-6 Rawalpindi-VI (2002-2018); PP-12 Rawalpindi-VII & PP-13 Rawalpindi-VIII (2018-2023)

PP-11 Rawalpindi-V (پی پی-11، راولپنڈى-5) is a Constituency of Provincial Assembly of Punjab.

== 2008-2013:PP-6 Rawalpindi-VI ==
Provincial election 2008: PP-6 Rawalpindi-VI
Party	Candidate	Votes	%	±%
PML(N)	Ch. Sarfraz Afzal	40,626	52.79	
PML(Q)	Muhammad Basharat Raja	17,771	23.09	
PPP	Jahfar Hussain Shah	16,787	21.81	
MMA	Qari Muhammad Zia Ul Haq Haqani	1,056	1.37	
Independent	Justan Javed	431	0.56	
Independent	Yasir Raza Malik	165	0.21	
Independent	Robina Tehseen	75	0.10	
Independent	Dr. Muhammad Asif Khan	53	0.07	
Turnout		78,302	42.25	
Total valid votes		76,964	98.29	
Rejected ballots		1,338	1.71	
Majority		22,855	29.70	
Registered electors		185,339		

== 2013-2018:PP-6 Rawalpindi-VI ==
General elections were held on 11 May 2013. Chaudhry Nisar Ali Khan won this seat with 51,826 votes.

Provincial election 2013: PP-6 Rawalpindi-VI
Party	Candidate	Votes	%	±%
Independent	Ch. Nisar Ali Khan	51,826	42.00	
PTI	Wasiq Qayyum Abbasi	49,398	40.03	
PPP	Bilal Afzal Khokhar	14,590	11.82	
JI	Muhammad Munir Azam	2,443	1.98	
AML	Syed Rahat Kazmi	2,080	1.69	
Others	Others (sixteen candidates)	3,058	2.48	
Turnout		125,094	53.52	
Total valid votes		123,395	98.64	
Rejected ballots		1,699	1.36	
Majority		2,428	1.97	
Registered electors		233,736		

== General elections 2018 ==
Provincial election 2018: PP-12 Rawalpindi-VII
Party	Candidate	Votes	%	±%
PTI	Wasiq Qayyum Abbasi	27,415	46.56	
Independent	Ch. Nisar Ali Khan	11,110	18.87	
PML(N)	Faisal Qayyum Malik	10,375	17.62	
TLP	Sufi Zahoor Ahmad Shah	3,892	6.61	
Independent	Raja Abid Hussain	2,272	3.86	
Independent	Jaffar Hussain Shah	1,160	1.97	
MMA	Muhammad Maqsood Khan	1,140	1.94	
PPP	Asfand Yar Raja	888	1.51	
Others	Others (eight candidates)	629	1.06	
Turnout		60,031	52.58	
Total valid votes		58,881	98.08	
Rejected ballots		1,150	1.92	
Majority		16,305	27.69	
Registered electors		114,162		

== General elections 2024 ==
Provincial election 2024: PP-11 Rawalpindi-V
Party	Candidate	Votes	%	±%
PML(N)	Imran Ilyas Chaudhry	27,657	44.96	
Independent	Chaudhry Asif Ali	16,594	26.97	
Independent	Haji Zafar Iqbal	5,593	9.09	
TLP	Javed Iqbal	4,349	7.07	
Independent	Raja Ishtiaq Ahmad	2,287	3.72	
Others	Others (thirty candidates)	5,042	8.19	
Turnout		63,065	50.04	
Total valid votes		61,522	97.55	
Rejected ballots		1,543	2.45	
Majority		11,063	17.99	
Registered electors		126,018		
hold				

== See also ==
- PP-10 Rawalpindi-IV
- PP-12 Rawalpindi-VI
