= Chaudhary Tanvir Khan =

Pakistani politician

Senator Chaudhary Tanvir Khan

Member of the Senate of Pakistan
- In office March 2015 – March 2021

Personal details
- Party: Pakistan Muslim League (N)

Chaudhary Tanvir Khan (Urdu: چودھری تنویر خان) is a Pakistani politician who was a Member of the Senate of Pakistan from March 2015 to March 2021. He was charged with assassinating PTI's MPA and parliamentary secretary revenue Chaudhry Muhammad Adnan. Chaudhry Tanveer Khan and his sons are being tried in court regarding this charge of assassination.

== Political career ==
Khan was arrested in 2001, convicted in a corruption case and imprisoned at Central Jail Rawalpindi (also known as Adiala Jail) for 1.5 years. According to Khan, he was prosecuted only because he hosted Kulsoom Nawaz when she visited Rawalpindi to meet her son Hussain Nawaz.

He was elected to the Senate of Pakistan as a candidate of the Pakistan Muslim League (N) in the 2015 Pakistani Senate election.

In March 2024, he was added to the FIA's Provincial National Identification List (PNIL) to prevent him from leaving the country after he was made part of an investigation related to the assassination of Chaudhry Muhammad Adnan, an independent candidate, ran from constituency NA-57 Rawalpindi-VI in the 2024 Pakistani general election. According to media reports, Adnan had political differences with Tanvir Khan and he had repeatedly expressed concerns about his safety, indicating that he perceived Tanvir Khan as a threat. Adnan made it explicit that if any harm came to him, he would hold Tanvir Khan accountable.
