= Azra Quraishi =

Pakistani botanist

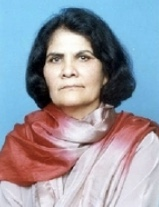
- Azra Quraishi in 1999
- Born: 22 September 1945; Tonk State, Rajasthan, India
- Died: 22 November 2002 (aged 57); Rawalpindi, Pakistan
- Education: University of Paris-Sud (PhD)
- Scientific career
- Fields: Botany

Azra Quraishi (22 September 1945 – 22 November 2002) was a leading botanist from Pakistan. She worked on the improvement of potato production in Pakistan and became known for her work on tissue culture. She was given the Borlaug Award in 1997 and the Ordre des Palmes académiques in 2002. She is credited with raising potato production in Pakistan by 5%.

== Early life and education ==
Quraishi was born in 1945 in Rajasthan, British India, to Abdus Sattar Quraishi and Salma Quraishi. Her family moved to Rawalpindi in Pakistan in the upheaval caused by the British-orchestrated partition of India. She obtained her first degree from Gordon College in her home city and, in 1966, obtained her master's degree from the University of the Punjab in Lahore.

After lecturing for several years at Viqar-un-Nisa Girls College in Rawalpindi, Quraishi traveled overseas on a Government of Pakistan scholarship. As a result, she obtained a master's degree in 1973 for her tissue culture research on Solanum tuberosum var., BF-15. Within three years she had obtained her doctorate from the University of Paris-Sud in Orsay, France for related work which was a "Study of callogenesis and organogenesis from explant of in vitro shoots in Solanum tuberosum var., BF-15".

== Scientific career ==
Azra Quraishi created virus-free seed potatoes in Pakistan. This research affected her country's trading position as it reduced the need to import seed potatoes from the Netherlands as she had increased Pakistan's annual potato production by 5%. This contribution brought her national recognition. Azra Quraishi also "successfully launched projects of micropropagation of banana, date palm, and screening salt tolerance through tissue culture in local wheat and rice cultivars." She had published more than 140 research papers.

== Awards and recognition ==
Her contributions earned Azra Quraishi many awards:

- Hamdard Pakistan Award in 1992
- Norman Borlaug Award for Field Research and Application in 1997
- Pakistan Agricultural Research Council (PARC/PARSA) Millennium Award for Best Scientist in 2001
- France's Ordre des Palmes académiques in 2002

At a memorial ceremony in Islamabad on 26 November 2002, Badruddin Soomro, Chairman PARC, announced that the Institute of Agriculture Biotechnology and Genetics Research (IABGR) would be renamed in Quraishi's honour. Soomro acknowledged that the glass ceiling had prevented Quraishi from the promotion she deserved. She had been promoted to be the Chief Scientific Officer and Deputy Director General, Agriculture Biotechnology Institute, Pakistan Agricultural Research Council (PARC). Quraishi had no children but she contributed towards her nephew and the financial costs of dozens of poor children.

Azra Quraishi was a member of several societies including the Pakistan Botanical Society.

== Publications ==
Quraishi published over 140 scientific research papers in internationally recognized scientific journals and 85 popular science articles. Quraishi participated in over 70 national and international conferences, symposia or seminars in Pakistan, India, Canada, Egypt, Philippines, USA, UK, India, Jordan, Bangladesh, and, in the month before her death, China.

== Death ==
Azra Quraishi died on 22 November 2002 at age 57.
