= Raja Rashid Hafeez =

Pakistani politician

Provincial Minister of Punjab for Literacy and Non Formal Basic Education
- In office 27 August 2018 – April 2022

Member of the Provincial Assembly of the Punjab
- In office 15 August 2018 – 14 January 2023
- Constituency: PP-16 Rawalpindi-XI
- In office 29 May 2013 – 31 May 2018

Personal details
- Born: 24 October 1976 (age 50) Rawalpindi, Punjab, Pakistan
- Party: PTI (2013-present)

Raja Rashid Hafeez is a Pakistani politician who was the Provincial Minister of Punjab for Literacy and Non Formal Basic Education, in office from 27 August 2018 till April 2022. He had been a member of the Provincial Assembly of the Punjab from August 2018 till January 2023. Previously, he was a Member of the Provincial Assembly of Punjab from 2002 to 2007 and again from May 2013 to May 2018.

== Early life and education ==
He was born on 24 October 1976 in Rawalpindi.

He has a degree of Bachelor of Arts which he obtained from Government College Asghar Mall Rawalpindi.

== Political career ==
He was elected to the Provincial Assembly of the Punjab as a candidate of Pakistan Muslim League (Q) (PML-Q) from PP-11 (Rawalpindi-XI) in the 2002 Punjab provincial election. He received 15,532 votes and defeated a candidate of Pakistan Peoples Party (PPP). From 2002 to 2007, he served as Parliamentary Secretary for Local Government and Rural Development.

He ran for the seat of the Provincial Assembly of the Punjab as a candidate of PML-Q from PP-11 (Rawalpindi-XI) in the 2008 Punjab provincial election, but was unsuccessful. He received 11,578 votes and lost the seat to Zia Ullah Shah, a candidate of Pakistan Muslim League (N).

He was re-elected to the Provincial Assembly of the Punjab as a candidate of Pakistan Tehreek-e-Insaf (PTI) from PP-11 (Rawalpindi-XI) in the 2013 Punjab provincial election.

He was re-elected to the Provincial Assembly of the Punjab as a candidate of the PTI from PP-16 Rawalpindi-XI in the 2018 Punjab provincial election.

On 27 August 2018, he was inducted into the provincial Punjab cabinet of Chief Minister Sardar Usman Buzdar. On 6 September 2018, he was appointed Provincial Minister of Punjab for Literacy and Non Formal Basic Education.

He ran for a seat in the Provincial Assembly from PP-16 Rawalpindi-XI as a candidate of the PTI in the 2023 Punjab provincial election.
