= National University of Modern Languages, Rawalpindi =

Public university in Pakistan

- Type: Public
- Established: 1999 (as APCOMS); 2020 (as NUML Rawalpindi)
- Academic affiliations: National University of Modern Languages, University of Engineering and Technology, Taxila, Pakistan Engineering Council
- Chancellor: President of Pakistan
- Location: Rawalpindi, Punjab, Pakistan; 33.5795°N 73.0611°E
- Campus: Urban
- Website: numlrwp.numl.edu.pk

The National University of Modern Languages, Rawalpindi, formerly known as APCOMS, is a university branch located in Rawalpindi, Punjab, Pakistan and is part of National University of Modern Languages.

== History ==
It was founded as Army Public College of Management & Sciences (APCOMS) in 1999 under the administrative control of the Inspector General Training & Evaluation (IGT&E), Pakistan Army. Its engineering programs are affiliated with University of Engineering and Technology, Taxila (UET, Taxila) and management programs are affiliated with National University of Modern Languages, Islamabad (NUML).

Initially, it started only management sciences, computer science and software engineering. Then, it started electrical engineering in 2007 and civil engineering in 2018. The founding principal Brig. Hubdar Ahmed Madni remained the principal from 1999 to 10 July 2020.

Brig. Dr. Asif Iqbal officially took over as the new principal on 13 July 2020. Subsequently, it has been converted into Rawalpindi branch of National University of Modern Languages. In September 2020, Brig. Muhammad Ibrahim officially took over as the new Pro-Rector of National University of Modern Languages Rawalpindi. In January 2024, Ibrahim was replaced by Brig. Syed Nadir Ali as Pro-Rector.

== Academics ==
=== Departments ===
The university branch currently consists of following departments:

- Department of Electrical Engineering
- Department of Computer Science and Engineering
- Department of Business Administration
- Department of Accounting and Finance
- Department of Civil Engineering

=== Degrees ===
Discipline	Degree Program	
Discipline	BS / B.Com. / BBA	MS / M Phil / M.Com/ MBA
Electrical Engineering	✓	✓
Civil Engineering	✓	✓
Computer Science	✓	✓
Software Engineering	✓	✓
Business Administration	✓	✓
Commerce	✓	

== See also ==
- National University of Modern Languages, Islamabad
- University of Engineering and Technology, Taxila
- List of educational institutions in Rawalpindi
