= Asad Abbas =

Pakistani politician

Member of the Provincial Assembly of Punjab
- Incumbent
- Assumed office 29 February 2024

Personal details
- Party: MWM (2024-present)

Asad Abbas is a Pakistani politician who has been a member of the Provincial Assembly of the Punjab since 2024.

== Political career ==
He was elected to the Provincial Assembly of the Punjab as a candidate of Majlis Wahdat-e-Muslimeen from constituency PP-18 Rawalpindi-XII in the 2024 Pakistani general election.
