= Ejaz Khan =

Pakistani politician

Member of the Provincial Assembly of the Punjab
- In office 15 August 2018 – 14 January 2023
- Constituency: PP-18 Rawalpindi-XIII
- In office 29 May 2013 – 31 May 2018
- Constituency: PP-12 (Rawalpindi-XII)

Personal details
- Born: 10 April 1967 (age 59) Rawalpindi, Punjab, Pakistan
- Party: PTI (2013-present)

Ejaz Khan is a Pakistani politician who had been a member of the Provincial Assembly of the Punjab from August 2018 till January 2023. Previously he was member of the Punjab Assembly from May 2013 to May 2018.

== Early life and education ==
He was born on 10 April 1967 in Rawalpindi.

He graduated from University of the Punjab in 1990 with a Bachelor of Arts degree.

== Political career ==
He was elected to the Provincial Assembly of the Punjab as a candidate of the Pakistan Tehreek-e-Insaf (PTI) from PP-12 (Rawalpindi-XII) in the 2013 Punjab provincial election.

He was re-elected to Provincial Assembly of the Punjab as a candidate of the PTI from PP-18 Rawalpindi-XIII in the 2018 Punjab provincial election.

He ran for a seat in the Provincial Assembly from PP-18 Rawalpindi-XIII as a candidate of the PTI in the 2024 Punjab provincial election.
