= Moti Bazaar =

Bazaar in Rawalpindi, Pakistan

Moti Bazaar موتی بازار
- Bazaar
- Country: Pakistan
- Province: Punjab
- City: Rawalpindi

Moti Bazaar (Urdu: موتی بازار) is an old bazaar located in Rawalpindi, Pakistan.

== History ==
It was founded by Moti Lal in 1911.

Prior to the establishment of Pakistan in 1947, the bazaar had only twenty-two shops. The total number of these stores has now surpassed 1200. Every day, at least 8,000 people visit and shop in Moti Bazaar. Previously, this bazaar was solely for ladies, but now males and teenagers can visit the bazaar.

There is a mansion in the heart of the marketplace that serves as a school today. This residence was erected in 1883 and given the name Kanya Ashram in honour of Moti Lal's wife. It is also popularly known as 'Lal Haveli' due to its old red-brick structure.
