= Lal Haveli, Rawalpindi =

Lal Haveli
- لال حویلی
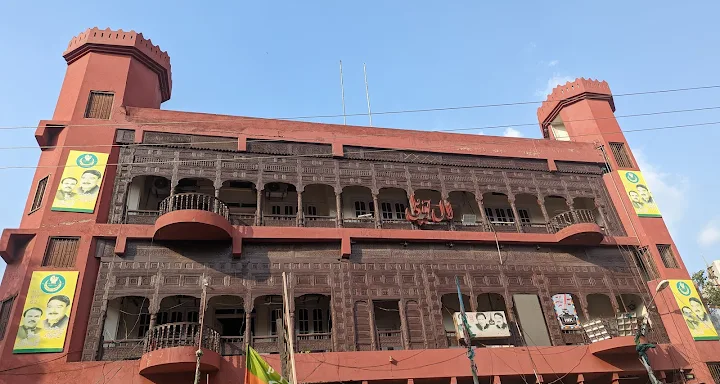
- View of Lal Haveli

General information
- Location: Rawalpindi, Pakistan
- Coordinates: 33°36′56″N 73°03′29″E
- Construction started: April 1922
- Completed: 1927
- Owner: Sheikh Rasheed Ahmed

Technical details
- Floor count: 3

Lal Haveli (Urdu: لال حویلی) is a historic haveli located in Rawalpindi, Pakistan. It is also the political centre for the Pakistani politician Sheikh Rashid Ahmad.

== History ==
The haveli was built by Dhan Raj Sehgal who left for India leaving the Haveli to his mistress Budhan Bai and thence it is said to have been the abode of that woman before the independence of Pakistan. Saigol had a Masjid and a Temple built within the confines of his Haveli, masjid for the woman and a temple for himself. The woman left the place for good when her brother was murdered here.

Sheikh Rasheed used to be a bookseller in this area at the time, his place of business being just a few meters from the front entrance. It is said that his infatuation with the grand building and its owner led him to buy the building later on in his life when he had the means to do so.

On 30 January 2023, the Evacuee Trust Property Board sealed the Lal Haveli residence over “illegal occupation”.
