= Government Viqar-un-Nisa Women University =

Public university in Punjab, Pakistan

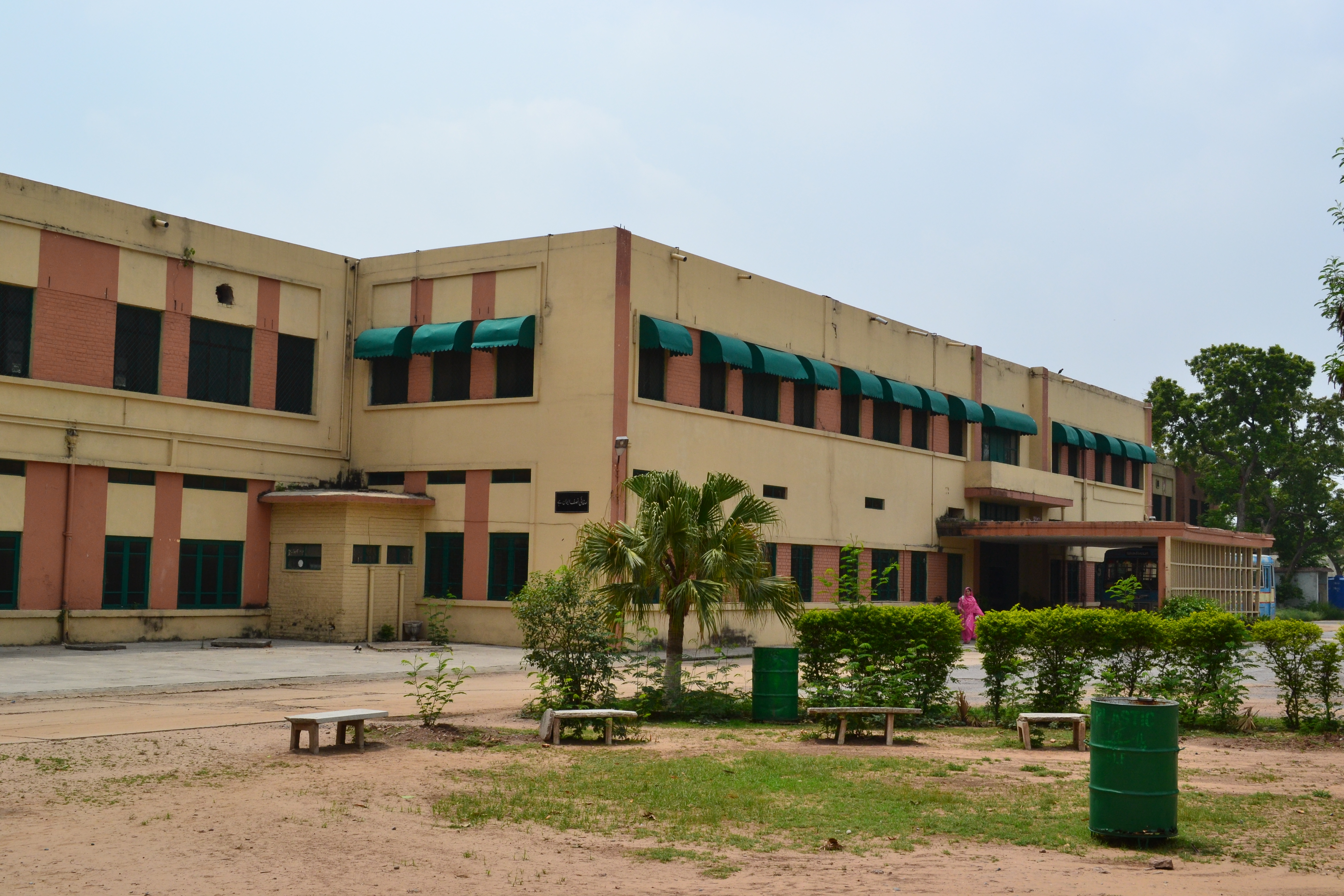
- Former names: Government Viqar-un-Nisa College for Women, Rawalpindi
- Type: Public
- Established: 2022
- Chancellor: Governor of the Punjab
- Location: Rawalpindi, Punjab, Pakistan
- Website: www.gvnc.edu.pk

Government Viqar-un-Nisa Women University, formerly known as Government Viqar-un-Nisa College for Women, Rawalpindi, is a public women's university in Rawalpindi, Punjab, Pakistan.

== History ==
It was founded in the early 1950s by Begum Viqar un Nisa Noon, wife of Feroz Khan Noon. Begum Viqar-un-Nisa Noon also founded the Viqar-un-Nisa Noon Girls' Higher Secondary School in Rawalpindi. This college was the first established part of the school, but it has since then been taken over by the government. Today, the college remains a government institution while the school is still private.

In 2012, the Science Block was named after Arfa Karim.

In July 2021, this college for women was upgraded to a university.

== Programs ==
The Urdu and English languages are used at the postgraduate level to teach chemistry, physics, zoology, applied psychology and Islamic studies.

== Faculty ==
Azra Quraishi lectured here on botany for several years.

== See also ==
- List of educational institutions in Rawalpindi
