= Sheikh Rashid Shafique =

Pakistani politician

Federal Parliamentary Secretary for Narcotics Control
- In office 30 August 2019 – 10 April 2022
- President: Arif Alvi
- Prime Minister: Imran Khan
- Minister: Shehryar Afridi

Member of the National Assembly of Pakistan
- In office 29 October 2018 – 17 January 2023
- Constituency: NA-60 (Rawalpindi-IV)

Personal details
- Party: JIP (2026-present)
- Other political affiliations: AML (2023-2026); PTI (2018-2023); PML(Q) (2002-2008)
- Relations: Sheikh Rasheed Ahmad (uncle)

Sheikh Rashid Shafique is a Pakistani politician who was a member of the National Assembly of Pakistan from October 2018 until January 2023.

== Political career ==
Shafique was elected to the National Assembly of Pakistan as a candidate of Pakistan Tehreek-e-Insaf (PTI) from Constituency NA-60 (Rawalpindi-IV) in the 2018 Pakistani by-elections held on 14 October 2018.

== Controversies ==
Rashid Shafique was arrested from Islamabad airport as soon as his return for promoting the disrespect of Prime Minister of Pakistan, Shehbaz Sharif in Holy Place of Madina, nominating him as an open promoter for liberalism, when linked to blasphemy of Islam. He was also nominated in a case filed against PTI leaders in Faisalabad.
