= Rawalpindi Women University =

University in Rawalpindi, Pakistan

- Former names: Government Post Graduate Girls College, University of Gujrat, Sub-Campus 6th Road Satellite Town Rawalpindi
- Established: December 4, 2019
- Affiliations: HEC
- Chancellor: Governor of Punjab, Pakistan
- Vice-Chancellor: Dr. Anila Kamal
- Academic staff: 120
- Administrative staff: 90
- Students: 3500
- Location: 6th Road, Satellite Town, Rawalpindi, Punjab, Pakistan
- Nickname: RWU
- Website: rwu.edu.pk

The Rawalpindi Women University (RWU) is a public university funded by the Government of Punjab, Pakistan in Rawalpindi, Punjab, Pakistan. The university has been running 15 BS Honors,16 Masters and 10 M.Phil. programs successfully.

The university was founded in 2019 as government of Punjab upgraded Government Post Graduate Girls College Satellite Town, Rawalpindi.

== History ==
Originally, Rawalpindi Women University was first established as a women's degree college in 1950 in the heart of the Rawalpindi city. College spread on 160 kanals, its aim was to impart education to women. In 1983 the government deemed it fit to raise its status to a postgraduate college. Later in 2010, 26 best colleges were selected within the province Punjab, with an aim to launch BS Honors Programs and RWU was on the top of the list. This college was selected as the Sub-Campus of the University of Gujrat in 2014. Since then, its functioning and capacity has been equal to that of any university in the province Punjab. The college was inaugurated as a University on 12th April, 2019.

== Faculties and Departments ==
The Rawalpindi Women University has divided into two academic sections, Faculty of Sciences and Faculty of Humanities Social Sciences.

=== Faculty of Sciences ===
- Department of Chemistry
- Department of Botany
- Department of Zoology
- Department of Physics
- Department of Mathematics
- Department of Statistics
- Department of Computer Science
- Department of Information Technology

=== Faculty of Humanities Social Sciences ===
- Department of Business Administration
- Department of Psychology
- Department of Political Science
- Department of English
- Department of Urdu
- Department of Mass Communication
- Department of Fine Arts

== Research, Innovation and Commercialization ==
In Rawalpindi Women University, Office of Research, Innovation and Commercialization (ORIC) is established according to Higher Education Commission guidelines. Office of Research, Innovation and Commercialization is built to comply with Higher Education Commission's mission of transforming Universities of Pakistan to drive high impact innovation, applied research and entrepreneurship.
