= Khalid Hameed (newscaster) =

Pakistani newscaster

- خالد حمید
- Born: Khalid Hameed Baig; Rawalpindi
- Occupation: TV News presenter
- Years active: 1972 - present
- Television: Pakistan Television (PTV)
- Awards: Pride of Performance Award by the President of Pakistan (1990); Nigar Award (1985)

Khalid Hameed Baig or Khalid Hameed is a Pakistani newscaster who worked at Radio Pakistan and Pakistan Television during the 1970s and 1980s. As of 2025, he is associated with Voice of America (Urdu).

== Life and career ==
Hameed was born in Rawalpindi. He joined Pakistan Television as a news presenter in February 1972. According to a Gallup survey in 1986, he was the most popular male PTV newscaster.

As of January 2025, Hameed is working for Voice of America (Urdu).

== Awards and recognition ==
Year	Award	Category	Result	Ref.
1985	Nigar Award	Best newscaster	Won	
1990	Pride of Performance Award by the President of Pakistan	Arts	Won	
