= Chaudhry Muhammad Adnan =

Pakistani politician (1976–2024)

- چودھری محمد عدنان

Member of the Provincial Assembly of the Punjab
- In office 15 August 2018 – 16 January 2023
- Constituency: PP-11 Rawalpindi-VI

Personal details
- Born: 15 February 1976 Rawalpindi, Punjab, Pakistan
- Died: 12 February 2024 (aged 47) Rawalpindi, Punjab, Pakistan
- Cause of death: Assassination by gunshot
- Party: PTI (2018–2024)

Chaudhry Muhammad Adnan (15 February 1976 – 12 February 2024) was a Pakistani politician who was a member of the Provincial Assembly of the Punjab from August 2018 to January 2023. He was assassinated on February 12, 2024.

== Early life and education ==
Chaudhry Muhammad Adnan was born on 15 February 1976 in Rawalpindi to Chaudhary Muhammad Jan. He graduated from Punjab University.

== Political career ==
Adnan was elected to the Provincial Assembly of the Punjab as a candidate of the Pakistan Tehreek-e-Insaf (PTI) from PP-11 Rawalpindi-VI in the 2018 Punjab provincial election, and during his tenure he served as the parliamentary secretary for social welfare and parliamentary secretary for revenue from 2018 to 2020.

Adnan ran for the National Assembly of Pakistan from Rawalpindi NA-57 and the Provincial Assembly of the Punjab from PP-19 in the 2024 Pakistani general election.

== Death ==
Adnan was gunned down on 12 February 2024 in Rawalpindi at the age of 47.
