= Sheikh Rasheed Ahmad =

Pakistani politician

Sheikh Rasheed Ahmed
- شیخ رشیداحمد
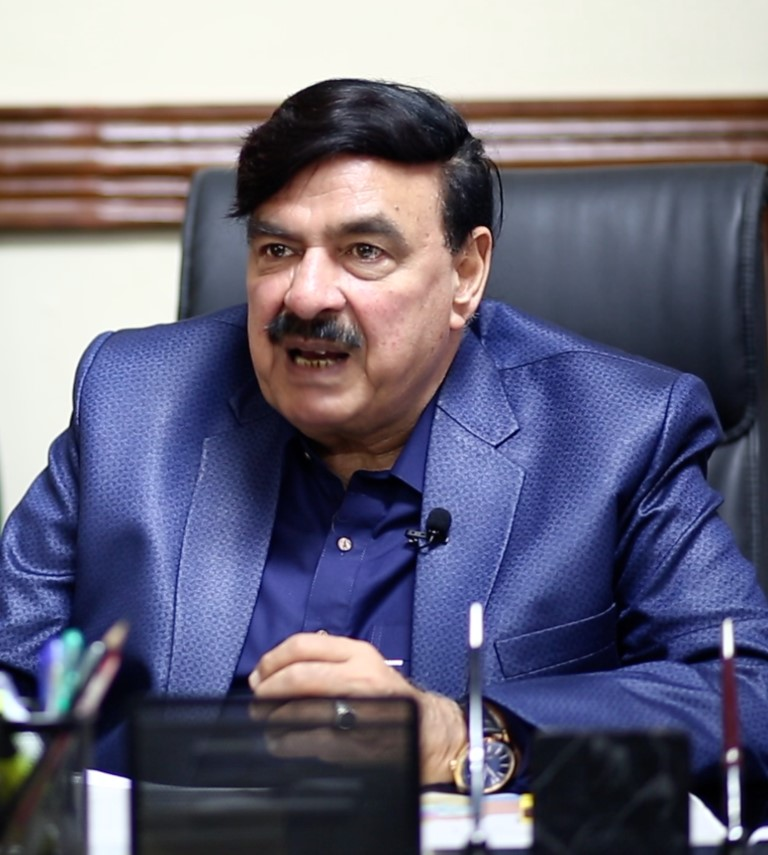

38th Ministry of Interior (Pakistan)
- In office 11 December 2020 – 10 April 2022
- Prime Minister: Imran Khan
- Preceded by: Ijaz Ahmed Shah
- Succeeded by: Rana Sanaullah

Ministry of Railways (Pakistan)
- In office 18 August 2018 – 11 December 2020
- President: Mamnoon Hussain; Arif Alvi
- Prime Minister: Imran Khan
- Preceded by: Roshan Khursheed Bharucha (caretaker)
- Succeeded by: Azam Swati
- In office 25 April 2006 – 15 November 2007
- President: Pervez Musharraf
- Prime Minister: Shaukat Aziz
- Preceded by: Saleemur Rahman Akhoond
- Succeeded by: Ghulam Ahmed Bilour

Minister of Information and Broadcasting (Pakistan)
- In office 2 September 2004 – 25 April 2006
- President: Pervez Musharraf
- Prime Minister: Shaukat Aziz
- Succeeded by: Muhammad Ali Durrani
- In office 30 June 2004 – 25 August 2004
- President: Pervez Musharraf
- Prime Minister: Shujat Hussain
- In office 21 November 2002 – 26 June 2004
- President: Pervez Musharraf
- Prime Minister: Mir Zafarullah Khan Jamali

Ministry of Labour (Pakistan)
- In office 11 July 1997 – 12 October 1999
- President: Farooq Leghari; Wasim Sajjad; Muhammad Rafiq Tarar
- Prime Minister: Nawaz Sharif

Ministry of Overseas Pakistanis and Human Resource Development
- In office 11 July 1997 – 12 October 1999
- President: Farooq Leghari; Wasim Sajjad; Muhammad Rafiq Tarar
- Prime Minister: Nawaz Sharif

Federal Minister for Youth Affairs
- In office 11 July 1997 – 6 August 1998
- President: Farooq Leghari; Wasim Sajjad; Muhammad Rafiq Tarar
- Prime Minister: Nawaz Sharif

Ministry of Tourism (Pakistan)
- In office 11 July 1997 – 6 August 1998
- President: Farooq Leghari; Wasim Sajjad; Muhammad Rafiq Tarar
- Prime Minister: Nawaz Sharif

President of AML
- Incumbent
- Assumed office June 2008

Federal Minister for Culture
- In office 11 July 1997 – 6 August 1998
- President: Farooq Leghari; Wasim Sajjad; Muhammad Rafiq Tarar
- Prime Minister: Nawaz Sharif
- In office 10 September 1991 – 18 July 1993
- President: Ghulam Ishaq Khan
- Prime Minister: Nawaz Sharif

Ministry of Industries and Production (Pakistan)
- In office 10 September 1991 – 18 July 1993
- President: Ghulam Ishaq Khan
- Prime Minister: Nawaz Sharif

Member of the National Assembly of Pakistan
- In office 20 March 1985 – 10 August 2023
- Preceded by: Shahid Khaqan Abbasi
- Succeeded by: Rana Sanaullah
- Constituency: NA-55 (Rawalpindi-VI)

Personal details
- Born: 6 November 1950 (age 76) Rawalpindi, Punjab, Pakistan
- Party: AML (2008-present)
- Other political affiliations: PML-N (1990-2002)
- Relatives: Sheikh Rashid Shafique (nephew)
- Education: Government Gordon College; University of Punjab
- Profession: Politician

Sheikh Rasheed Ahmad (Urdu: شیخ رشید احمد; born 6 November 1950) is a Pakistani politician who served as the 38th Interior Minister of Pakistan in the Imran Khan government from 2020 to 2022. He is the founder and leader of Awami Muslim League, and also maintains close relations with the political party of former Prime Minister Imran Khan Pakistan Tehreek-e-Insaf.

He is a former Member of the National Assembly of Pakistan, first elected 1985 from , and has been elected to the assembly multiple times.

== Early life and education ==
Ahmad was born on 6 November 1950, into a Kashmiri family in Bhabra Bazaar in Rawalpindi, Punjab.

He received his early education from Polytechnic College and graduated from Government Gordon College. Ahmad was a leader of the student union at Gordon College. He completed his Bachelor of Laws at the University of Punjab in 1973. He later earned his Master's in Political Science from the same university in 1982.

== Political career ==
=== Early career ===
Ahmad began his political career during his student years and was actively involved against the military regime of Ayub Khan.

He was elected to the National Assembly eight times. In the 1985 Pakistani general election, which was held on non-party basis, he was elected as a member of the National Assembly for the first time from Rawalpindi. Rasheed was re-elected to the National Assembly for the second time in the 1988 Pakistani general election, this time campaigning on the Islamic Democratic Alliance ticket. In 1990, he campaigned again on the IDA ticket and was re-elected a third time to the National Assembly, later becoming the Minister of Sports. Under his tenure, Pakistan won the Cricket World Cup in 1992 under the captaincy of Imran Khan. In the 1993 election, he was re-elected, this time on the Pakistan Muslim League (N) ticket. Rasheed was re-elected in 1997, and in 2002 the PML-N refused to allot a ticket to him. He decided to run as an independent, and secured a sixth re-election.

=== Musharraf administration ===
Later, Rasheed joined PML-Q, and because he was a close friend of then-president Pervez Musharraf, he was appointed Federal Minister for Information and Broadcasting in the Zafarullah Khan Jamali cabinet in November 2002. As minister for information, Ahmed, on public places, had assumed the role of the spokesman of Musharraf and an advocate of the government of Jamali.

In May 2006, he was made Federal Minister for Railways. In the 2008 Pakistani general election, Ahmad ran for the seat of National Assembly on a Pakistan Muslim League-Q ticket, losing the election for the first time from both the Rawalpindi constituencies he contested, NA-55 and NA-56, to PML-N. He won the election from NA-56 for multiple times. There were rumours that Ahmad had fled to Spain following the defeat. However, these allegations were later found to be false. In an interview, Ahmad said his defeat in the election was due to a raid on Lal Masjid and that "he had promised to quit politics after the 2008 elections but his defeat had changed his mind."

He later left PML-Q where he was a senior vice-president and created his own political party Awami Muslim League (AML) and appointed himself as president of the party.

In February 2010, when Ahmad was in the run for the National Assembly seat during a by-election in NA-55, Rawalpindi, he lost the election to Malik Shakeel Awan by an enormous margin. Ahmad earlier supported Musharraf's military operation against the militants in Federally Administered Tribal Areas and the Siege of Lal Masjid and has been on the hit list of militants. He was left devastated by this embarrassing loss and was spotted smoking his cigar alone at times.

=== Alliance with PTI ===
In the 2013 Pakistani general election, Ahmad made an electoral alliance with Imran Khan to support each other in their respective constituencies in the election. It was reported that Ahmad has requested for a merger between his party and Imran Khan's PTI, however, the PTI decided not to go for an alliance with any political party. He was re-elected as a member of the National Assembly for the seventh time from Rawalpindi. In public circles, he is known for making witty remarks and political predictions. He is also known for switching political allegiances from one party to another. In July 2017, he was chosen by the PTI as a candidate for the post of prime minister, following the resignation of outgoing Prime Minister Nawaz Sharif after the Panama Papers case decision. He secured 33 votes in the 342-seat parliament and was unsuccessful. He was re-elected to the National Assembly as a candidate of AML from NA-62 (Rawalpindi-VI) constituency in the 2018 Pakistani general election.

On 18 August 2018, Imran Khan formally announced his federal cabinet structure, and Ahmad was named as Minister for Railways. On 20 August 2018, he was sworn in as Federal Minister for Railways in the cabinet of Prime Minister Imran Khan. In 2019, as the railway minister, Rasheed severed rail transport links between India and Pakistan due to the revocation of special status for Kashmir.

In December 2020, in a cabinet reshuffle, he was given the portfolio of the Minister for the Interior.

On 10 April 2022, Ahmad was removed from his ministry after former Prime Minister Imran Khan was ousted after losing a no-confidence vote.

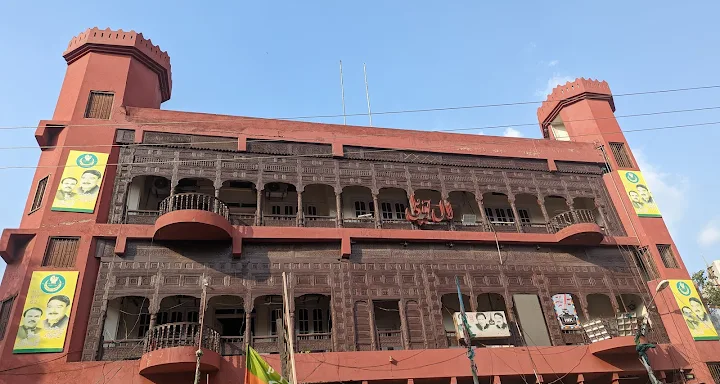
Sheikh Rashid's political hub, Lal Haveli, Rawalpindi, pictured in 2023.

He submitted his nomination papers for National Assembly, from NA-57 Rawalpindi-VI but after Pakistan Tehreek-e-Insaf announced for various constituencies in Rawalpindi, including the ones on which Rashid was already contesting, the disappointed former interior minister withdrew his nomination papers from one of the two constituencies that he had been vying for.

Ahmed had submitted papers for NA-56 and NA-57 constituencies, but withdrew from NA-57 whereas his nephew, Sheikh Rashid Shafique, withdrew his papers from NA-56 and would be contesting from NA-57. Both uncle and nephew contested from the platform of Awami Muslim League (AML).

He ran the election from NA-56 Rawalpindi-V as a candidate of AML, but was unsuccessful he received only 5,725 votes and lost his previous seat to Muhammad Hanif Abbasi, a candidate of PML-N received 96,649 votes.

== Controversies ==
In 2004, during his tenure as Minister for Information, Sheikh Rashid Ahmad was replaced with Shaukat Aziz as minister-in-waiting who would receive then visiting Prime Minister of India Atal Bihari Vajpayee Ji after the Indian External affairs ministry's objection to the nomination of Ahmad as the minister-in-waiting.

In 2005, India Today reported that Yasin Malik claimed that Ahmad had run a jihadi camp at Fateh Jung in Punjab, where around 3,500 jihadis were trained. Ahmad denied running such a camp. Later it was reported that Yasin Malik retracted his statements and denied he had ever said that Ahmad had run such a camp.

In 2005, during Ahmad's tenure as Minister for Information, he applied for a permit to travel to Srinagar, in his personal capacity to visit the graves of his grandparents and meet his relatives in Jammu & Kashmir. However India denied Ahmed's request to travel to Srinagar.

In 2012, Ahmad was detained at Houston airport over suspected links with Lashkar-e-Taiba and Hafiz Muhammad Saeed, an alleged mastermind of the 2008 Mumbai attacks. He was released after five hours of questioning after official protest by the Pakistani Ambassador to the United States.

In 2014, Ahmad was off-loaded from a Toronto-bound PIA flight due to non-issuance of clearance by the Canadian authorities.

In 2018, Ahmad was accused by Malik Shakeel Awan of concealing and failing to mention in his electoral papers possession of 100 kanal (12.5 acres) of land. Ahmad won the legal case regarding the allegation, and later confessed that he had forgotten to mention the land in his electoral papers. The decision was considered extremely biased in favour Ahmad and had remained disputed.

In August 2026, a video surfaced showing Ahmad appearing alongside senior figures associated with Lashkar-e-Taiba (LeT), in which he described himself as a "ghulam" (slave) of LeT leader Hafiz Saeed and expressed support for him, while making threats against India. Ahmad also referred to the discovery of Saeed's telephone number on his phone, which he said had previously resulted in action against him in the United States. The remarks prompted renewed scrutiny of political figures in Pakistan to have associations with LeT and other terror groups.

== Books ==
- Farzand-e-Pakistan [Son of Pakistan], 1995, 200 p. His first book, it was a best-seller, having gone through at least 13 editions.
- Lal Haveli Sey Akwaam-e-Mutthahida Tak [From Lal Haveli to the United Nations], 2020, 352 p.
