= Daughter of Destiny: An Autobiography =

1989 memoir by Benazir Bhutto

- Author: Benazir Bhutto
- Language: English
- Genre: Memoir
- Publisher: Simon & Schuster
- Publication date: 7 January 1989
- Publication place: United States; Pakistan
- Pages: 480
- ISBN: 978-0061672682
- Followed by: Reconciliation: Islam, Democracy, and the West

Daughter of Destiny: An Autobiography is a 1988 memoir by Benazir Bhutto, the 11th Prime Minister of Pakistan. The book was also released as Daughter of the East: An Autobiography from Hamish Hamilton in 1988.

== Content ==
In the book, Bhutto narrates her life from her birth, her childhood, days in Oxford University, execution of her father, Zulfikar Ali Bhutto by General Muhammad Zia-ul-Haq, days in captivity, her arrange marriage to Asif Ali Zardari, birth of her first child, Bilawal and struggle to restore democracy in her homeland Pakistan.

== Reception ==
The book got mixed reviews from critics.

The New York Times published a mixed review by Caryn James, who noted

... she seems less realistic when discussing politics than when explaining her controversial, traditional arranged marriage. She could not meet a husband in any ordinary way, she says, and was aware of her peculiar status as a single woman in a Muslim country. "An arranged marriage was the price in personal choice I had to pay for the political path my life had taken," she writes. After her dramatic history, this cold-blooded response to the most intimate choice of her life simply seems like one more of Benazir Bhutto's paradoxes.

Hillary Clinton praised the book in her 2014 memoir Hard Choices, writing, "It tells the riveting story of how determination, hard work and political smarts enable her to rise to power in a society where many women still lived in a strict isolation, called purdah."

A review published in Foreign Affairs by Donald S. Zagoria wrote "... is a historical account, however, the book is marred by Ms. Bhutto's white-washed presentation and selective account of her father's political career; for example, the fact that his government, as well as Zia's, was regularly accused of gross human rights violations by Amnesty International is never mentioned".

Publishers Weekly wrote a positive review by stating that "the reader grows impatient to learn more about what she intends to do for Pakistan, but the book ends on the eve of her triumphant election in late 1988."
