= PP-18 Rawalpindi-XII =

Constituency of the Provincial Assembly of Punjab, Pakistan

- Constituency for the Provincial Assembly of Punjab
- Region: Rawalpindi city area of Rawalpindi District

Current constituency
- Created from: PP-14 Rawalpindi-XIV (2002-2018); PP-17 Rawalpindi-XII (2018-2023)

PP-18 Rawalpindi-XII (پی پی-18، راولپنڈى-12) is a Constituency of Provincial Assembly of Punjab.

== 2008—2013: PP-14 Rawalpindi-XIV ==
Provincial election 2008: PP-14 Rawalpindi-XIV
Party	Candidate	Votes	%	±%
PML(N)	Raja Hanif Abbassi Advocate	26,489	47.09	
PPP	Rashid Naseem Abbassi	17,446	31.01	
Independent	Pirzada Rahat Masood Qadoosi	7,954	14.14	
PML(Q)	Fayyaz ul Hassan Chohan	4,166	7.41	
Independent	Shahid Mahmood Raja	152	0.27	
Independent	Raja Imran Ali	20	0.04	
Independent	Ch. Musadaq Mahmood Ghuman	14	0.02	
Independent	Amir Hussain Shah	10	0.02	
Turnout		57,581	34.04	
Total valid votes		56,251	97.69	
Rejected ballots		1,330	2.31	
Majority		9,043	16.08	
Registered electors		169,170		

== 2013—2018: PP-14 Rawalpindi-XIV ==
General elections were held on 11 May 2013. Raja Abdul Hanif won this seat with 36,852 votes.

Provincial election 2013: PP-14 Rawalpindi-XIV
Party	Candidate	Votes	%	±%
PML(N)	Raja Abdul Hanif	36,886	44.13	
PTI	Chaudhry Muhammad Asghar	32,720	39.15	
PPP	Raja Kamran Hussain	6,949	8.31	
JI	Dabeer Ahmed Khan	4,619	5.53	
Others	Others (sixteen candidates)	2,410	2.88	
Turnout		84,446	57.12	
Total valid votes		83,584	98.98	
Rejected ballots		862	1.02	
Majority		4,166	4.98	
Registered electors		147,837		

== 2018—2023 PP-17 Rawalpindi-XII ==
From 2018 PP-11 Rawalpindi-XII Become PP-17 Rawalpindi-XII With Some changes has follow (a) The following Census Charges of Rawalpindi City (1) Charge No.18 (2) Charge No.19 (3) Charge No.20 (4) Charge No.21 Circle No. 1 and 2 (5) Charge No.27 and (6) Charge No.28 of Rawalpindi District.

General elections are scheduled to be held on 25 July 2018.

Provincial election 2018: PP-17 Rawalpindi-XII
Party	Candidate	Votes	%	±%
PTI	Fayaz Ul Hasan Chohan	40,984	48.56	
PML(N)	Abdul Hanif	30,359	35.97	
MMA	Raza Ahmed Shah	8,253	9.78	
TLP	Sheikh Muhammad Nadeem	3,861	4.58	
Others	Others (eight candidates)	938	1.11	
Turnout		85,501	51.91	
Total valid votes		84,395	98.71	
Rejected ballots		1,106	1.29	
Majority		10,625	12.59	
Registered electors		164,708		

== General elections 2024 ==
Provincial election 2024: PP-18 Rawalpindi-XII
Party	Candidate	Votes	%	±%
MWM	Asad Abbas	46,295	46.14	
PML(N)	Sajjad Khan	30,640	30.54	
JI	Imran Khan	5,601	5.58	
TLP	Ch. Safdar Hussain Sahi	4,785	4.77	
PPP	Raja Shahid Mehmood Khan	3,207	3.20	
Independent	Alhaj Azhar Iqbal Sati	3,028	3.02	
Others	Others (thirty candidates)	6,782	6.75	
Turnout		102,409	41.95	
Total valid votes		100,338	97.98	
Rejected ballots		2,071	2.02	
Majority		15,655	15.60	
Registered electors		244,097		
hold				

== See also ==
- PP-17 Rawalpindi-XI
- PP-19 Rawalpindi-XIII
