= Fatima Jinnah Women University =

University in Rawalpindi, Pakistan

Coordinates: 33.5864°N 73.0645°E

Fatima Jinnah Women University, Rawalpindi
- جامع زنان فاطمه جناح
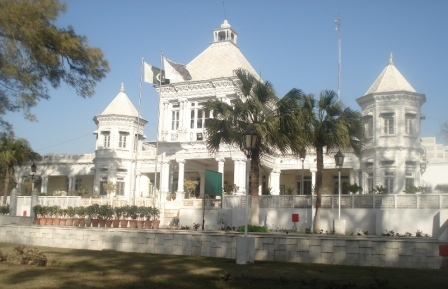
- Main building and VC office of FJWU
- Other name: FJWU
- Motto: 'Opening Portals of Excellence through Higher Education'
- Type: Public university
- Established: 1998
- Accreditation: Higher Education Commission (Pakistan)
- Chancellor: Governor of Punjab
- Vice-Chancellor: Prof. Dr. Bushra Mirza
- Dean: Azra Yasmin
- Students: c. 5362
- Location: Rawalpindi, Punjab, Pakistan
- Campus: Urban
- Colors: Orange, green, white
- Website: fjwu.edu.pk

Fatima Jinnah Women University (Urdu: جامع زنان فاطمه جناح) is a public Sector university in the neighborhood of Mall Road of Rawalpindi, Punjab, Pakistan, near Kachari Chowk.

== History ==
Fatima Jinnah Women University (FJWU) was founded on the initiative of then Chief Minister of Punjab Shehbaz Sharif. The university began classes on 28 December 1998 and Najma Najam became the first vice-chancellor. The first cohort of students graduated in September 2001.

== Recognition ==
Regarded as the first women's university in Pakistan, it is ranked at number 61 as of 2024, down from 18 in the Higher Education Commission of Pakistan rankings of 2015. Dr. Najma Najam, a neuroscientist, was the founding Vice-Chancellor of this institution.

Students come from all over the country from as far as Balochistan, Southern Punjab, Gilgit-Baltistan, Khyber Pakhtunkhwa and Sindh.

== Campuses ==
The main building is Victorian, built as a residence by Sikh brothers Mohan and Sohan Singh.

Fatima Jinnah Women University (FJWU) has two main campuses in Rawalpindi: The City Campus at Kacheri Chowk and Campus II on Chakri Road.

== Academic departments ==
=== Arts and Humanities ===
- Anthropology
- Sociology
- Urdu
- English
- Fine Arts
- Education
- Islamic Studies
- Gender Studies

=== Business and Social Sciences ===
- Behavioral Sciences
- Business Administration
- Communication and Media Studies
- Commerce
- Economics
- Computer Arts
- Computer Science
- Chemistry
- International Relations
- Public Administration
- Biotechnology
- Bioinformatics

=== Engineering ===
- Electronic Engineering
- Environmental Sciences
- Software Engineering

=== Science and Technology ===
- Mathematical Sciences
- Physics
- Chemistry
- Computer Science

== Women Research and Resource Center ==
The Women Research and Resource Centre researches gender and social issues to reflect the academic and professional development of women in general and in the context of Pakistan's society in particular.

== FM Radio Services ==
Fatima Jinnah is host to an FM radio channel that is broadcast during university hours and operated in the department of Mass Communications.
