= Awami Muslim League Pakistan =

Awami Muslim League Pakistan عوامی مسلم لیگ پاکستان
- Abbreviation: AML
- Leader: Sheikh Rasheed Ahmad
- Founder: Sheikh Rasheed Ahmad
- Founded: 2008; 18 years ago
- Split from: PML(Q)
- Headquarters: Central Secretariat, Lal Haveli, Rawalpindi, Pakistan
- Ideology: Islamism; Conservatism; Mass politics Populism
- Political position: Centrism
- Colours: Green and white

Election symbol
- Inkpot with Pen

Party flag
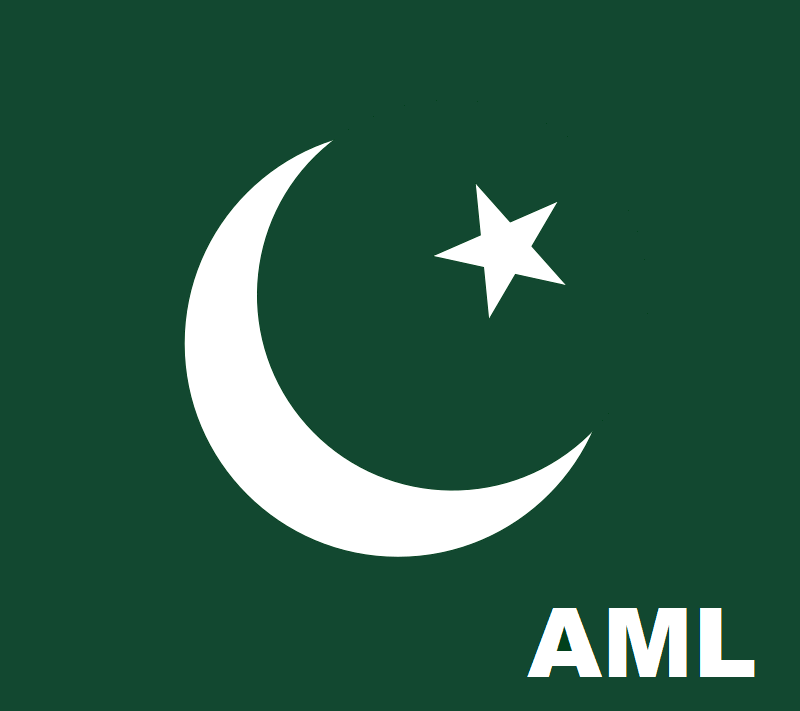

Website
- www.aml.org.pk

Awami Muslim League Pakistan (Urdu: عوامی مسلم لیگ پاکستان) is a Pakistani political party formed in June 2008 by Shaikh Rasheed Ahmad. The party tends to have close relations with the PTI party.

== Former party ==
This was also the name of the political party founded by Abdul Hamid Khan Bhashani and Huseyn Shaheed Suhrawardy and which later evolved into the Awami League, the party that, under the leadership of Sheikh Mujibur Rahman (himself a former aide to Suharwardy).

The All Pakistan Awami Muslim League was formed as a breakaway faction of the "All Pakistan Muslim League" in 1949, within two years of the formation of Pakistan. Two parties of the same name were created in Pakistan. The East Pakistan Awami Muslim League formed by Maulana Abdul Hamid Khan Bhashani, which later became Awami League The word Muslim was dropped in 1953.

== Electoral history ==
=== NA-62 (Rawalpindi-VI) ===
This constituency of Rawalpindi tends to be the primary electoral seat for AML leader, Shaikh Rasheed Ahmad since 1988. He won 6 consecutive elections from this area. Ahmad was elected as an independent candidate from this constituency receiving 60,649 votes in 2002 Pakistani general election. He lost to Javed Hashmi in 2008. He then again lost in the by-elections to PML-N's Shakeel Awan after tight contest, held in 2010. In 2013 general elections, he defeated Shakeel Awan.

=== National Assembly elections ===
National Assembly
| Election | Votes | % | Seats | +/– |
|---|---|---|---|---|
| 2013 | 93,046 | 0.20% | 1 / 342 | ▲1 |
| 2018 | 119,362 | 0.22% | 1 / 342 | Steady |
| 2024 | 9,259 | 0.02% | 0 / 336 | ▼1 |

== See also ==
- Politics of Pakistan
- List of political parties in Pakistan
- List of Islamic political parties
