= NA-55 Rawalpindi-IV =

Constituency of the National Assembly of Pakistan

- Constituency for the National Assembly of Pakistan

- Location of Rawalpindi District in Pakistan.
- Region: Rawalpindi city area of Rawalpindi District
- Electorate: 431,832

Current constituency
- Party: Pakistan Muslim League (N)
- Member: Malik Ibrar Ahmed
- Created from: NA-54 Rawalpindi-V

NA-55 Rawalpindi-IV (این اے-55، راولپنڈی-4) is a constituency for the National Assembly of Pakistan.

== Boundaries ==
The constituency was renamed NA-61 Rawalpindi-V from NA-54 and was delimited to include all of Rawalpindi Cantonment and three census charges of Chaklala Cantonment. In the earlier delimitation, much of Chaklala was included in this constituency. Now that area has been shifted to the new NA-60 (old NA-56).

== Members of Parliament ==
=== 1977–2002: NA-39 Rawalpindi-IV ===
Election	Member	Party
1977	Abdul Qayyum Butt	PPP
1985	Raja Shahid Zafar	PPP
1988	Raja Shahid Zafar	PPP
1990	Muhammad Ejaz ul Haq	IJI
1993	Muhammad Ejaz ul Haq	PML-N
1997	Muhammad Ejaz ul Haq	PML-N

=== 2002–2018: NA-54 Rawalpindi-V ===
Election	Member	Party
2002	Zamarud Khan	PPPP
2008	Malik Ibrar Ahmed	PML-N
2013	Malik Ibrar Ahmed	PML-N

=== 2018–2023: NA-61 Rawalpindi-V ===
Election	Member	Party
2018	Aamir Mehmood Kiani	PTI

=== 2024–present: NA-55 Rawalpindi-IV ===
Election	Member	Party
2024	Malik Ibrar Ahmed	PML-N

== Party Trends ==
Initially a bastion of the left-wing Pakistan Peoples Party (PPP) in the 1970 and 1977 elections, the constituency of Rawalpindi-V has seen a strong shift towards the conservative center-right parties since Zia's Islamist regime.

Candidates associated with the Pakistan Muslim League (N) (formally IJI) have performed considerably well in the general elections from this constituency. Since the 1988 elections, the party's candidates have won the constituency six times out of seven times, with the left-wing PPP only making winning inroads in the 2002 elections. This includes the 1988–1997 unbeaten streak of Nisar Ali Khan, who has never lost in this constituency. However, since the constituency delimitation in 2002, Nisar's traditional votebank has shifted into the predominantly rural NA-52, where he continues to dominate. While the NA-54 has become a predominantly urban constituency with votebanks for all major political parties.

However, since the reentry of the democratic socialist Pakistan Tehreek-e-Insaf into the fold of national politics in the 2013 elections, there has been a marked shift in the choices of the constituency's voters, with the party becoming a second major force in the area after PML-N.

== Voting Patterns ==
The voting pattern in NA-54 shows a division of votes between two parties or candidates, with other candidates playing a minor role in the elections. In 2002, the top two contenders received 72% of the polls with the winner securing the seat following a close competition with the runner-up. The winner's share increased sharply in 2008, when the top two contenders received 88% of the polled votes. According to the results, the winner secured the seat with a margin of 23.4% votes, showing a clear dominance in the elections. The polls in 2013 also witnessed a close race between the top two candidates, who secured 87% of the polled votes. Historical data shows that the second runner-up's share has decreased consistently over the years, indicating a clear two-party race in the constituency. Given the consistent voting pattern, the next polls may witness a similar trend. However, the decrease in the winner's share and the close race in 2013 suggest that an alliance between the runners-up may yield different results in upcoming elections.

== Detailed Results ==
=== Election 1988 ===
General election 1988: NA-40 Rawalpindi-V
Party	Candidate	Votes	%	±%
IJI	Chaudhary Nisar Ali Khan	64,186	48.8	–
PPP	Habib Khan	57,878	44.0	–
PAT	Muhammad Akram Shah	8,669	6.6^{†}	–
Turnout		131,432	59.99	–

^{†}As Pakistan Awami Ittehad.

=== Election 1990 ===
General election 1990: NA-40 Rawalpindi-V
Party	Candidate	Votes	%	±%
IJI	Chaudhary Nisar Ali Khan	78,530	55.5	▲6.7
PPP	Ghulam Sarwar Khan	63,021	44.5^{†}	▲0.5
Turnout		141,551	62.59	▲2.60

^{†}As People's Democratic Alliance.

=== Election 1993 ===
General election 1993: NA-40 Rawalpindi-V
Party	Candidate	Votes	%	±%
PML(N)	Chaudhary Nisar Ali Khan	76,288	51.6^{†}	▼3.9
PPP	Ghulam Sarwar Khan	64,800	43.8	▼0.7
JI	Dr. Muhammad Kamal	6,898	4.7^{‡}	▲4.7
Turnout		147,986	60.65	▼1.94

^{†} The Islami Jamhoori Ittehad was dissolved prior to the 1993 general elections, as JUI-F, JUI-S, and JI parted ways from the alliance. Subsequently, the core of the party, the Muslim League – Nawaz, contested elections for the first time as the Pakistan Muslim League (N).

^{‡}As the Pakistan Islamic Front.

=== Election 1997 ===
General election 1997: NA-40 Rawalpindi-V
Party	Candidate	Votes	%	±%
PML(N)	Chaudhry Nisar Ali Khan	64,186	51.3	▼0.3
PPP	Ghulam Sarwar Khan	57,878	46.3	▲2.5
PTI	Chaudhry Ghulam Jillani	3,588	2.3	▲2.3
MQM	Dr. Abdul Qadir Khan	1,243	1.0^{†}	▲1.0
Turnout		125,094	48.52	▼12.13

^{†}As Haq Parast Group.

=== Election 2002 ===
General elections were held on 10 October 2002. Zamurd Khan of the PPP won by 31,491 votes.

General election 2002: NA-54 Rawalpindi-V
Party	Candidate	Votes	%	±%
PPP	Zumarad Khan	31,491	38.27	
PML(N)	Raja Zafar-ul-Haq	28,805	35.00	
MMA	Shaukat Aziz Siddiqui	12,676	15.40	
PML(Z)	Ijaz-ul-Haq	4,164	5.06	
PTI	Ghulam Qadir	2,479	3.01	
PML(Q)	Ayaz Zahir Hashmi	1,640	1.99	
Others	Others (four candidates)	1,037	1.27	
Turnout		83,780	39.97	
Total valid votes		82,292	98.22	
Rejected ballots		1,488	1.78	
Majority		2,686	3.27	
Registered electors		209,619		

=== Election 2008 ===
Malik Ibrar Ahmed of the Pakistan Muslim League (N) succeeded in the election of 2008 and became a member of the National Assembly. The 2008 elections also saw the lowest turnout in the history of this constituency, at just 38.5%.

General election 2008: NA-54 Rawalpindi-V
Party	Candidate	Votes	%	±%
PML(N)	Malik Ibrar Ahmed	58,228	56.38	
PPP	Zumarad Khan	33,749	32.68	
PML(Q)	Muhammad Basharat Raja	10,400	10.07	
Others	Others (ten candidates)	910	0.87	
Turnout		104,501	38.51	
Total valid votes		103,287	98.84	
Rejected ballots		1,214	1.16	
Majority		24,479	23.70	
Registered electors		271,396		
PML(N) gain from PPP				

^{†}PML-Q's Allama Ayaz Zahir Hashmi competed in the 2002 elections and got 1,640 votes.

=== Election 2013 ===
General elections were held on 11 May 2013. A total of 166,523 votes were cast of which 165,049 were deemed valid. The overall turnout of the constituency was 55.36%. Malik Ibrar Ahmed of PML-N won by 7,649 votes and became the member of National Assembly.

General election 2013: NA-54 Rawalpindi-V
Party	Candidate	Votes	%	±%
PML(N)	Malik Ibrar Ahmed	76,336	46.25	
PTI	Hina Manzoor	68,687	41.62	
PPP	Zumarad Khan	13,185	7.99	
Others	Others (nineteen candidates)	6,841	4.14	
Turnout		166,850	55.47	
Total valid votes		165,049	98.92	
Rejected ballots		1,801	1.08	
Majority		7,649	4.63	
Registered electors		300,816		
PML(N) hold				

=== Election 2018 ===
General election 2018: NA-61 Rawalpindi-V
Party	Candidate	Votes	%	±%
PTI	Aamir Mehmood Kiani	105,086	50.74	▲9.14
PML(N)	Malik Ibrar Ahmed	60,135	29.04	▼17.26
TLP	Syed Shahid Pervez	9,249	4.90	▲4.90
MMA	Mian Zafar Yasin	3,899	2.06	▲0.26^{†}
PPP	Muhammad Gulzar	2,653	1.40	▼6.60
Others	Others (fourteen candidates)	5,134	2.72	
Turnout		188,980	51.38	▼3.98
Rejected ballots		2,898	1.54	
Majority		44,875	23.74	
Registered electors		367,782		
PTI gain from PML(N)				

^{†}JI contested as part of MMA.

=== Election 2024 ===
General elections were held on 8 February 2024. Malik Ibrar Ahmed won the election with 112,345 votes.

General election 2024: NA-55 Rawalpindi-IV
Party	Candidate	Votes	%	±%
PML(N)	Malik Ibrar Ahmed	112,345	47.80	▲18.76
PTI	Muhammad Basharat Raja (Note: Filed nomination papers as PTI candidate but ECP allowed him to run as an Independent)	96,799	41.18	▼9.56
TLP	Faisal Ul Hassan Khan	9,577	4.07	▼0.83
Others	Others (twenty-seven candidates)	16,333	6.95	
Turnout		238,873	55.32	▲3.94
Total valid votes		235,054	98.40	
Rejected ballots		3,819	1.60	
Majority		15,546	6.61	
Registered electors		431,832		
PML(N) gain from PTI				

== See also ==
- NA-54 Rawalpindi-III
- NA-56 Rawalpindi-V
