= NA-54 Rawalpindi-III =

Constituency of the National Assembly of Pakistan

- Constituency for the National Assembly of Pakistan
- Region: Wah Cantonment and Taxila Tehsil and Adiala of Rawalpindi Tehsil in Rawalpindi District
- Electorate: 466,344

Current constituency
- Party: Pakistan Muslim League (N)
- Member: Aqeel Malik
- Created from: NA-53 Rawalpindi-IV

NA-54 Rawalpindi-III (این اے-54، راولپنڈی-3) is a constituency for the National Assembly of Pakistan.

== Members of Parliament ==
=== 1970–1977: NW-29 Rawalpindi-IV ===
Election	Member	Party
1970	Raja Abdul Aziz Bhatti	PPP

=== 1977–2002: NA-39 Rawalpindi-IV ===
Election	Member	Party
1977	Nazar Hussain Kiyani	PPP
1985	Raja Shahid Zafar	Independent
1988	Raja Shahid Zafar	PPP
1990	Muhammad Ijaz-ul-Haq	IJI
1993	Muhammad Ijaz-ul-Haq	PML-N
1997	Muhammad Ijaz-ul-Haq	PML-N

=== 2002–2018: NA-53 Rawalpindi-IV ===
Election	Member	Party
2002	Ghulam Sarwar Khan	PML-Q
2008	Chaudhry Nisar Ali Khan	PML-N
2013	Ghulam Sarwar Khan	PTI

=== 2018–2023: NA-63 Rawalpindi-VII ===
Election	Member	Party
2018	Ghulam Sarwar Khan	PTI
By-election 2018	Mansoor Hayat Khan	PTI

=== 2024–present: NA-54 Rawalpindi-III ===
Election	Member	Party
2024	Aqeel Malik	PML(N)

== Election 2002 ==
General elections were held on 10 October 2002. Ghulam Sarwar Khan an independent candidate won by 66,900 votes.

General election 2002: NA-53 Rawalpindi-IV
Party	Candidate	Votes	%	±%
Independent	Ghulam Sarwar Khan	66,900	46.03	
PML(N)	Ch. Nisar Ali Khan	57,110	39.30	
Independent	Faisal Iqbal	9,984	6.87	
PPP	Sardar Shoaib Mumtaz Khan	6,673	4.59	
PAT	Syed Guftar Hussain Shah	3,596	2.47	
Others	Others (three candidates)	1,072	0.74	
Turnout		148,646	50.99	
Total valid votes		145,335	97.77	
Rejected ballots		3,311	2.23	
Majority		9,790	6.73	
Registered electors		291,549		

== Election 2008 ==
The result of general election 2008 in this constituency is given below.

=== Result ===
Nisar Ali Khan succeeded in the election 2008 and became the member of National Assembly.

General election 2008: NA-53 Rawalpindi-IV
Party	Candidate	Votes	%	±%
PML(N)	Chaudhary Nisar Ali Khan	72,257	41.19	
PML(Q)	Ghulam Sarwar Khan	49,068	27.97	
Independent	Faisal Iqbal	21,713	12.38	
PPP	Sardar Shoaib Mumtaz Khan	18,388	10.48	
Independent	Ch. Muhammad Kamran Ali Khan	13,390	7.63	
Others	Others (two candidates)	593	0.35	
Turnout		179,918	52.32	
Total valid votes		175,409	97.49	
Rejected ballots		4,509	2.51	
Majority		23,189	13.22	
Registered electors		343,853		
PML(N) gain from Independent				

== Election 2013 ==
=== Result ===
Ghulam Sarwar Khan of PTI succeeded in the election 2013 and became the member of National Assembly.

General election 2013: NA-53 Rawalpindi-IV
Party	Candidate	Votes	%	±%
PTI	Ghulam Sarwar Khan	110,593	46.65	
PML(N)	Chaudhary Nisar Ali Khan	102,430	43.20	
PPP	Syed Intikhab Hussain Shah	14,870	6.27	
Others	Others (ten candidates)	9,204	3.88	
Turnout		237,097	62.05	
Total valid votes		237,097	100	
Rejected ballots		0	0.00	
Majority		8,163	3.45	
Registered electors		382,115		
PTI gain from PML(N)				

== Election 2018 ==
General elections were held on 25 July 2018. Ghulam Sarwar Khan of Pakistan Tehreek-e-Insaf won the election but vacated this constituency in favor of NA-59 (Rawalpindi-III).

General election 2018: NA-63 Rawalpindi-VII
Party	Candidate	Votes	%	±%
PTI	Ghulam Sarwar Khan	100,986	47.67	
Independent	Chaudhary Nisar Ali Khan	65,767	31.05	
PML(N)	Sardar Mumtaz Khan	22,966	10.84	
Others	Others (five candidates)	22,107	10.44	
Turnout		215,669	58.14	
Total valid votes		211,826	98.22	
Rejected ballots		3,843	1.78	
Majority		35,219	16.62	
Registered electors		370,967		
PTI hold		Swing	N/A	

== By-election 2018 ==
By-elections were held in this constituency on 14 October 2018.

By-election 2018: NA-63 Rawalpindi-VII
Party	Candidate	Votes	%	±%
PTI	Mansoor Hayat Khan	71,782	59.26	▲11.59
PML(N)	Aqeel Malik	45,490	37.55	▲26.71
Others	Others (three candidates)	3,859	3.19	
Turnout		122,690	33.01	▼25.13
Total valid votes		121,131	98.73	▲0.51
Rejected ballots		1,559	1.27	▼0.51
Majority		26,292	21.71	▲5.09
Registered electors		371,713		
PTI hold		Swing	N/A	

== Election 2024 ==
General elections were held on 8 February 2024. Aqeel Malik won the election with 85,930 votes.

General election 2024: NA-54 Rawalpindi-III
Party	Candidate	Votes	%	±%
PML(N)	Aqeel Malik	85,930	37.25	N/A
PTI	Azra Masood (Note: Filed nomination papers as PTI candidate but ECP allowed her to run as an independent)	73,729	31.96	▼27.30
Independent	Chaudhary Nisar Ali Khan	19,106	8.28	N/A
IPP	Ghulam Sarwar Khan	16,891	7.32	N/A
TLP	Tahir Mehmood	13,282	5.76	▲3.61
Others	Others (twenty-five candidates)	21,766	9.43	
Turnout		235,928	50.59	
Total valid votes		230,704	97.79	
Rejected ballots		5,224	2.21	
Majority		12,201	5.29	
Registered electors		466,344		
PML(N) gain from PTI				

== See also ==
- NA-53 Rawalpindi-II
- NA-55 Rawalpindi-IV
