= Aligarh Institute of Technology =

Pakistani polytechnic institute

The Aligarh Institute of Technology (AIT) is a private polytechnic institute located in Karachi, Sindh, Pakistan. It was established in 1989 by Aligarh Muslim University Old Boys' Association of Pakistan (AMUOBA). It offers a Diploma of Associate Engineering (DAE) in affiliation with Sindh Board of Technical Education in following technologies:

- Electronics Technology
- Computer information technology
- Electrical technology
- Civil technology
- Mechanical technology
- Bio-medical technology
- Software technology

== See also ==
- Sindh Technical Education and Vocational Training Authority
- Sir Syed University of Engineering and Technology, Karachi
