= National Skills University Islamabad =

Public university in Islamabad, Pakistan

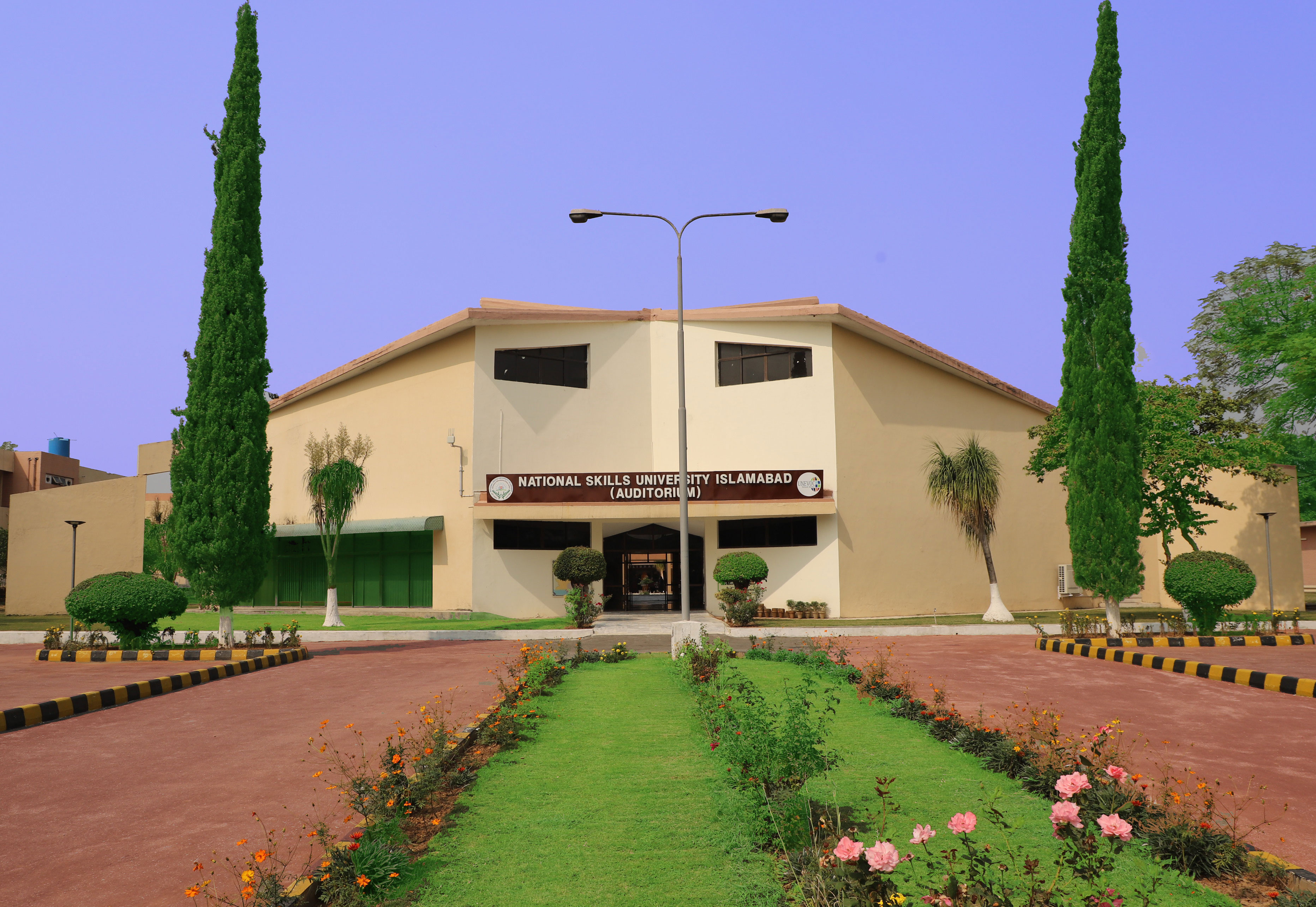
- Al Mukhtar Auditorium
- Other name: NSU Islamabad
- Former names: National Institute of Science and Technical Education Islamabad
- Motto: الکاسب حبیب اللّٰہ
- Motto in English: The Earnest Worker is the Beloved of Allah
- Type: Public
- Established: 2018
- Accreditation: NCEAC, NTC, AHPC; City & Guilds, London
- Affiliations: UNAI
- Academic affiliations: HEC, UNESCO, NAVTTC
- Chancellor: President of Pakistan
- Vice-Chancellor: Dr. Saud Altaf (Acting charge)
- Pro-Chancellor: Education Minister
- Location: Sector H-8/1, Faiz Ahmed Faiz Road,, Islamabad, 44000, Pakistan
- Campus: 26 acres (11 ha); Urban
- Website: nsu.edu.pk
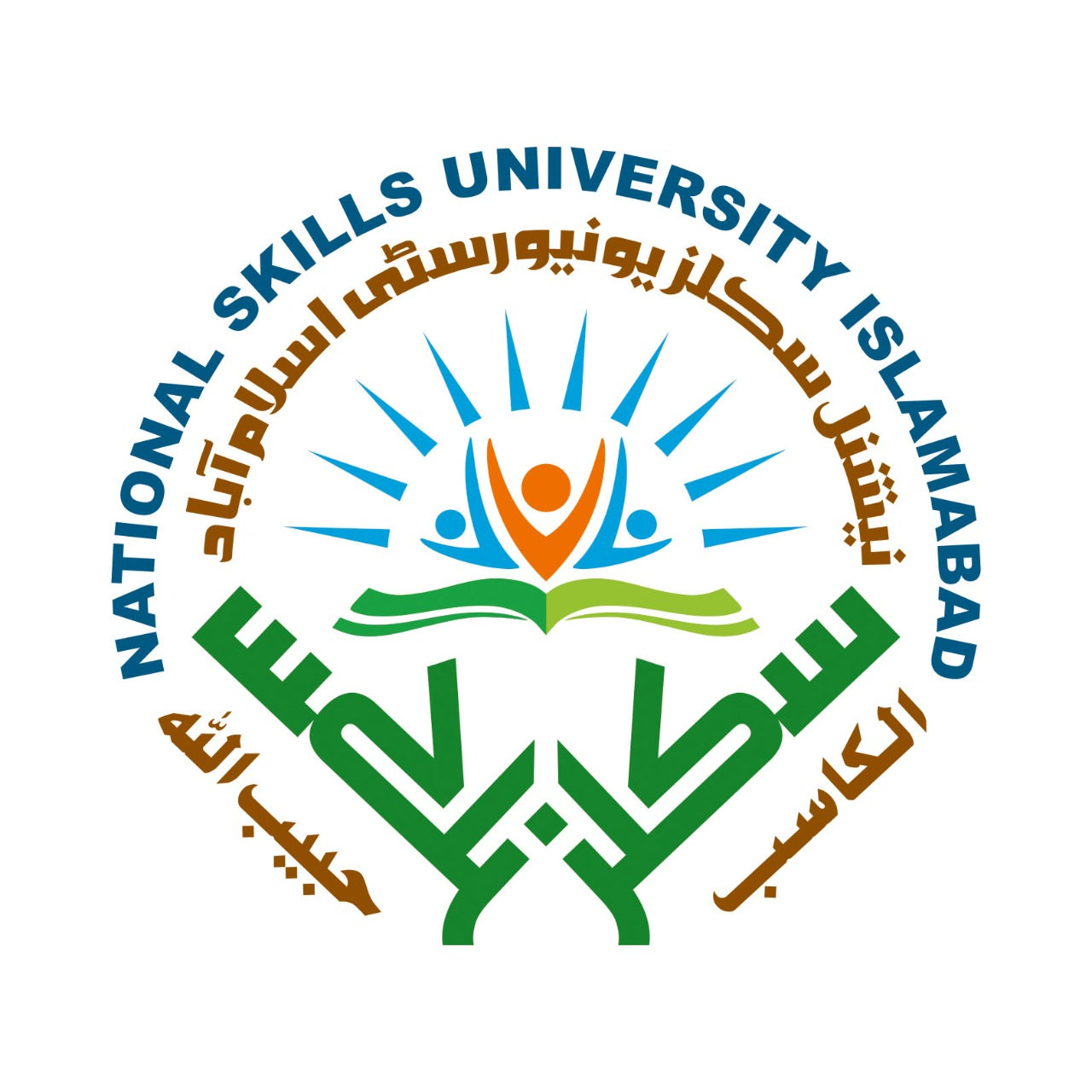

National Skills University Islamabad (Urdu: قومی جامعہ برائے ہنرمندی; commonly referred to as NSU Islamabad), is a public sector university established by Federal Government of Pakistan under the National Skills University Islamabad Act, 2018. NSU Islamabad is a degree awarding institution upgraded from a TVET institution formerly known as National Institute of Science and Technical Education.

NSU Islamabad is recognized by HEC and is accredited by National Technology Council, National Computing Education Accreditation Council. Internationally, NSU Islamabad is also a part of UNESCO-UNEVOC network member, United Nations Academic Impact and accredited by City and Guilds of London Institute.

== History ==
In 1985 and 1989, the Federal Government of Pakistan established the National Technical Teachers' Training College (NTTTC) and Institute for Promotion of Science Education and Training (IPSET) respectively. In 1997, both were merged and renamed as the National Institute of Science and Technical Education (NISTE) and declared it under the office of the then Ministry of Education.

In 2010, after the 18th amendment to the Constitution, NISTE was upgraded into Degree Awarding Institute (DAI) to offer various undergraduate and graduate-level engineering technologies programs.

The Parliament of Pakistan approved the Act to upgrade NISTE into National Skills University, Islamabad on March 7, 2018. Arif Alvi, the then President of Pakistan approved NSU Charter on March 12, 2018.

== Sarmad Tanveer Campus Muridke ==
The National Skills University Islamabad, Sarmad Tanveer Campus, was established in Muridke, Sheikhupura District, after obtaining a provisional NOC from the Higher Education Commission. The Senate of the National Skills University (NSU), Islamabad, approved the establishment of the Sarmad Tanveer Campus (STC) in Muridke at its 5th meeting. Classes were inaugurated on January 9, 2023, by Rana Tanveer Hussain, the then Federal Minister for Education. The campus was named in memory of his deceased son, Sarmad Tanveer.

A sub-campus on 4.8 ha (12 acres) of land is under construction. Meanwhile, to commence its educational activities, the university has rented a 510 square meter building.

The campus is currently offering short courses in collaboration with National Vocational and Technical Training Commission (NAVTTC), aimed at training students in technical skills that are in high demand in the job market. The duration of each course is 3-6 months.

== Al‑Mukhtar Auditorium ==
The Al‑Mukhtar Auditorium is a primary venue at National Skills University Islamabad used for academic seminars, conferences, student events, and cultural functions. In May 2025, NSU hosted a student recognition ceremony at the auditorium, presided over by the retired Air Marshal and the current Vice Chancellor of the Air University, Abdul Moeed Khan, where leadership praised the university’s achievements in information engineering technology and competitive excellence at the NUMLogic 2025 programming competition. The auditorium is equipped with modern audiovisual technology and seating arrangements designed to accommodate a large number of attendees. The auditorium serves as a hub for student engagement, faculty development programs, and institutional collaborations, supporting the university’s mission to promote skills-based education through interactive and inclusive platforms.

== National Peace Festival ==
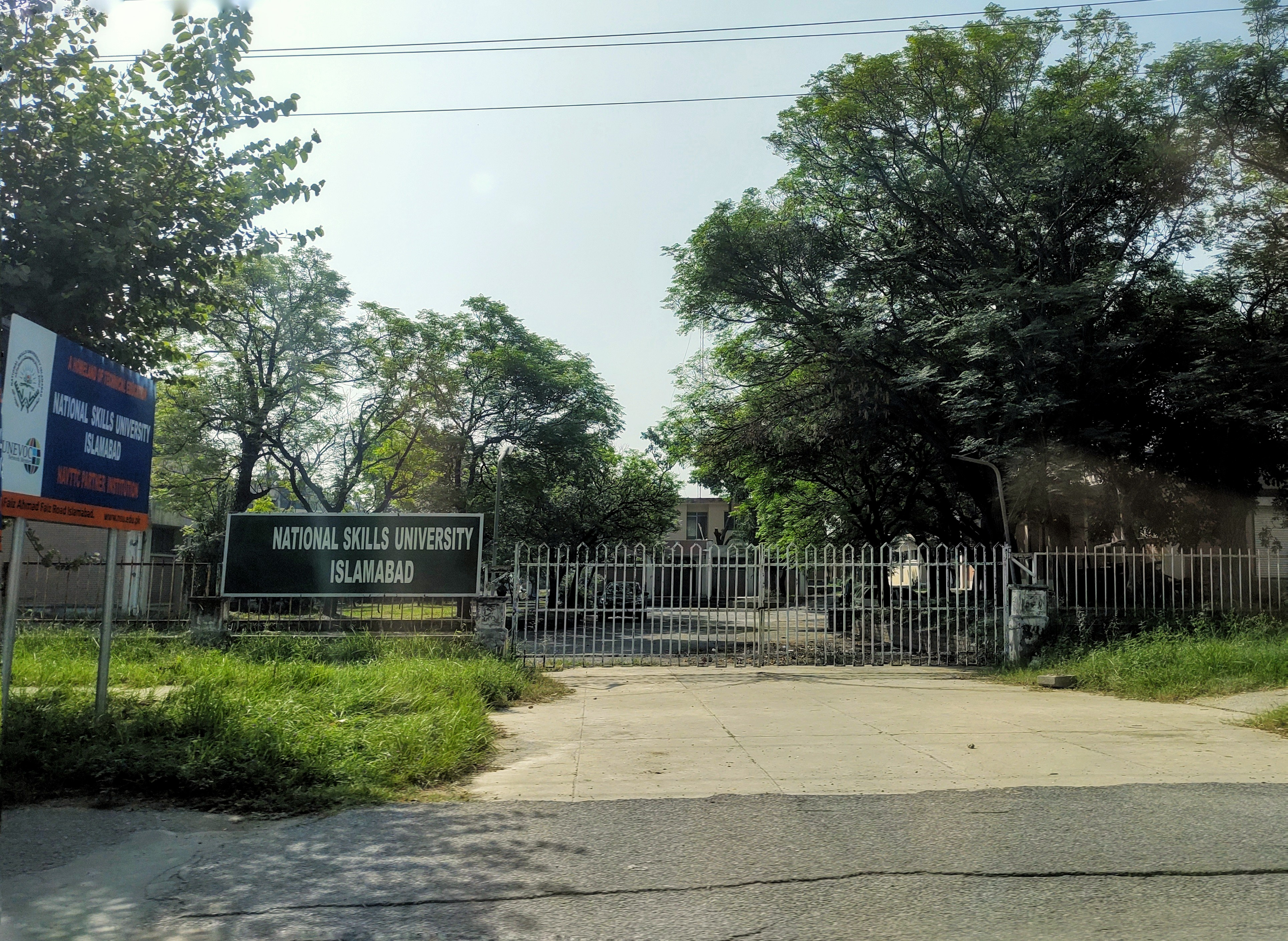
One of the university entrances in 2018

In 2025, National Skills University Islamabad hosted the National Peace Festival, an event aimed at promoting peace and youth engagement. The festival was attended by Wajiha Qamar, Parliamentary Secretary for Federal Education and Professional Training, who highlighted the importance of youth participation in peace building initiatives.

The event featured various activities, including speeches, performances, and exhibitions, with a focus on student-led contributions toward sustainable development and social cohesion. The festival emphasized the role of youth in achieving the United Nations Sustainable Development Goals, particularly Peace, Justice and Strong Institutions. The event was organized in collaboration with civil society organizations and national partners.

== Rankings ==
National Skills University Islamabad is ranked for UI GreenMetric 732 among renown universities in the world and 393 in Asia region.

== Faculties and Departments ==
National Skills University offers certificate and Degree courses to students. University has the following faculties with their respective departments.

=== Faculty of Building Technology and Built Environment ===
- Department of Civil Engineering Technology

=== Faculty of Electro-Technology ===
- Department of Electrical Engineering Technology

=== Faculty of Mechanical and Automotive Technology ===
- Department of Mechanical Engineering Technology

=== Faculty of Computing and Information Technology ===
- Department of Information Engineering Technology

=== Faculty of Management and Communication Studies ===
- Department of Management Sciences

=== Faculty of Basic Science and Humanities ===
- Department of General Studies
- Department of Medical Laboratory Technology
