= Larkana (disambiguation) =

Larkana is a city in Sindh, Pakistan.

Larkana may also refer to:

- Larkana District, a district of Sindh, Pakistan
- Larkana Taluka, a tehsil of Larkana District
- Larkana Division, an administrative unit of Sindh, Pakistan

== See also ==
- Larkana Junction railway station, a railway station in Pakistan
- Larkana Bulls, a local cricket team
