= Larkana =

Larkana لاڙڪانو (Sindhi) لاڑکانہ (Urdu)
- City
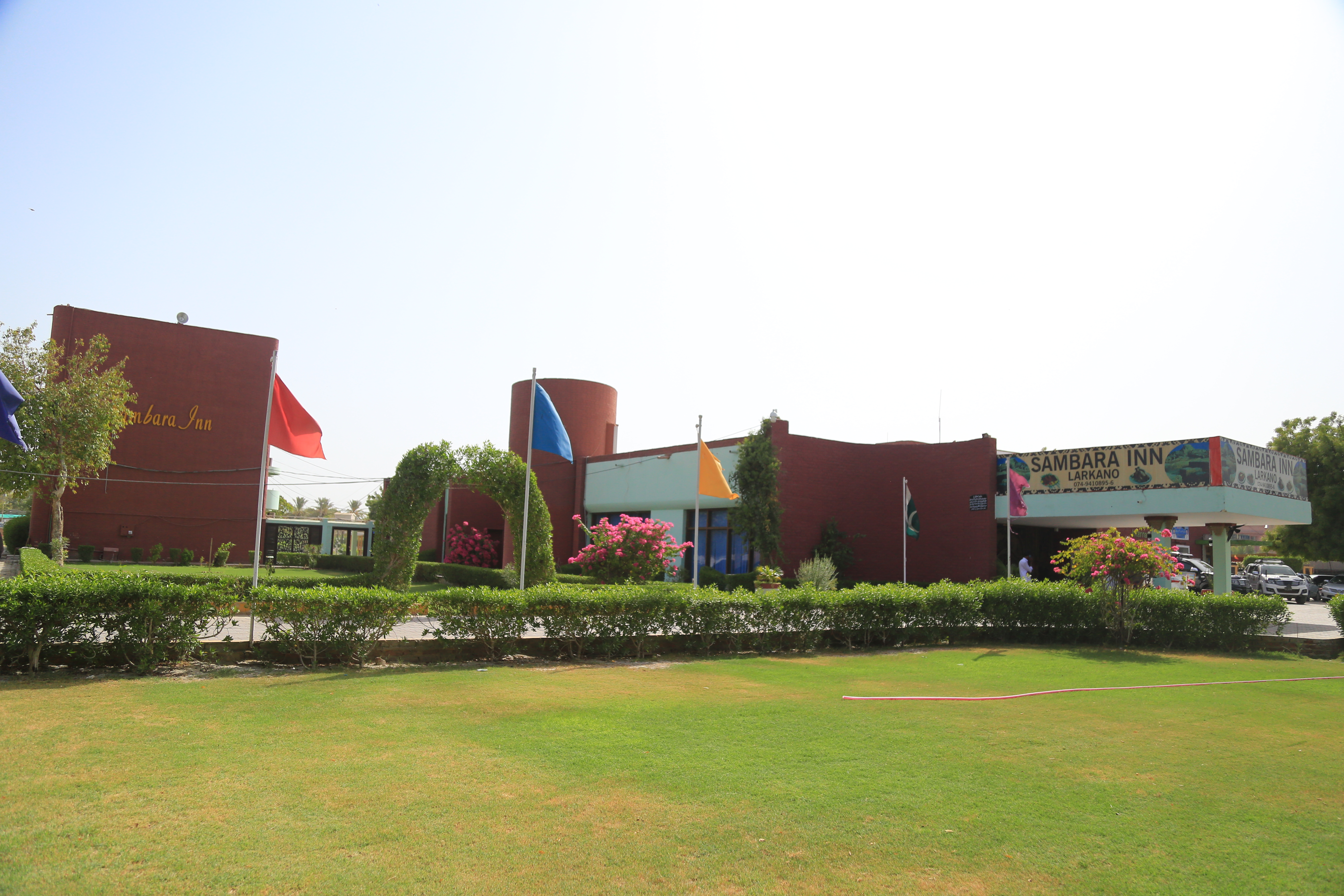
- Sambara Inn

- Emblem

- Location within Sindh Location within Pakistan
- Coordinates: 27°33′30″N 68°12′40″E
- Country: Pakistan
- Province: Sindh
- District: Larkana District
- Taluka: Larkana Taluka

Government
  - Type: Municipal Corporation
  - Mayor: Adv. Anwar Ali
  - Deputy Mayor: Vacant
  - MNA: Bilawal Zardari
  - MPA: Jameel Ahmed
  - Commissioner: Ghanwar Ali Laghari (BPS-20 PCS)
  - Regional Police Officer: Mazhar Nawaz Shaikh (BPS-20 PSP)

Area
  - City: 82 km^{2} (32 sq mi)
  - Metro: 1,906 km^{2} (736 sq mi)
- Elevation: 147 m (482 ft)

Population (2023)
  - City: 551,716
  - Rank: 18th in Pakistan
  - Density: 6,700/km^{2} (17,000/sq mi)
- Time zone: UTC+5 (PKT)
- Postal code: 77150
- Area code: 074
- Website: Larkana.pk

Larkana (Sindhi: لاڙڪانو, romanized: lāṛkānō; Urdu: لاڑکانہ, romanized: lāṛkāna) is a city located in the Sindh province of Pakistan. It is the 18th largest city of Pakistan by population. It is home to the Indus Valley civilization site Mohenjo-daro. The historic Indus River flows in east and south of the city.

The city is located within Larkana District. Formerly known as Chandka, Larkana is located on the south bank of the Ghar canal, about 40 miles (64 km) south of the town Shikarpur, and 36 miles (58 km) northeast of Mehar. With a population of 551,716 in the 2023 Census of Pakistan, it is the 4th most populated city of Sindh province (after Karachi, Hyderabad, and Sukkur), and the 19th most populated city in PAKISTAN.

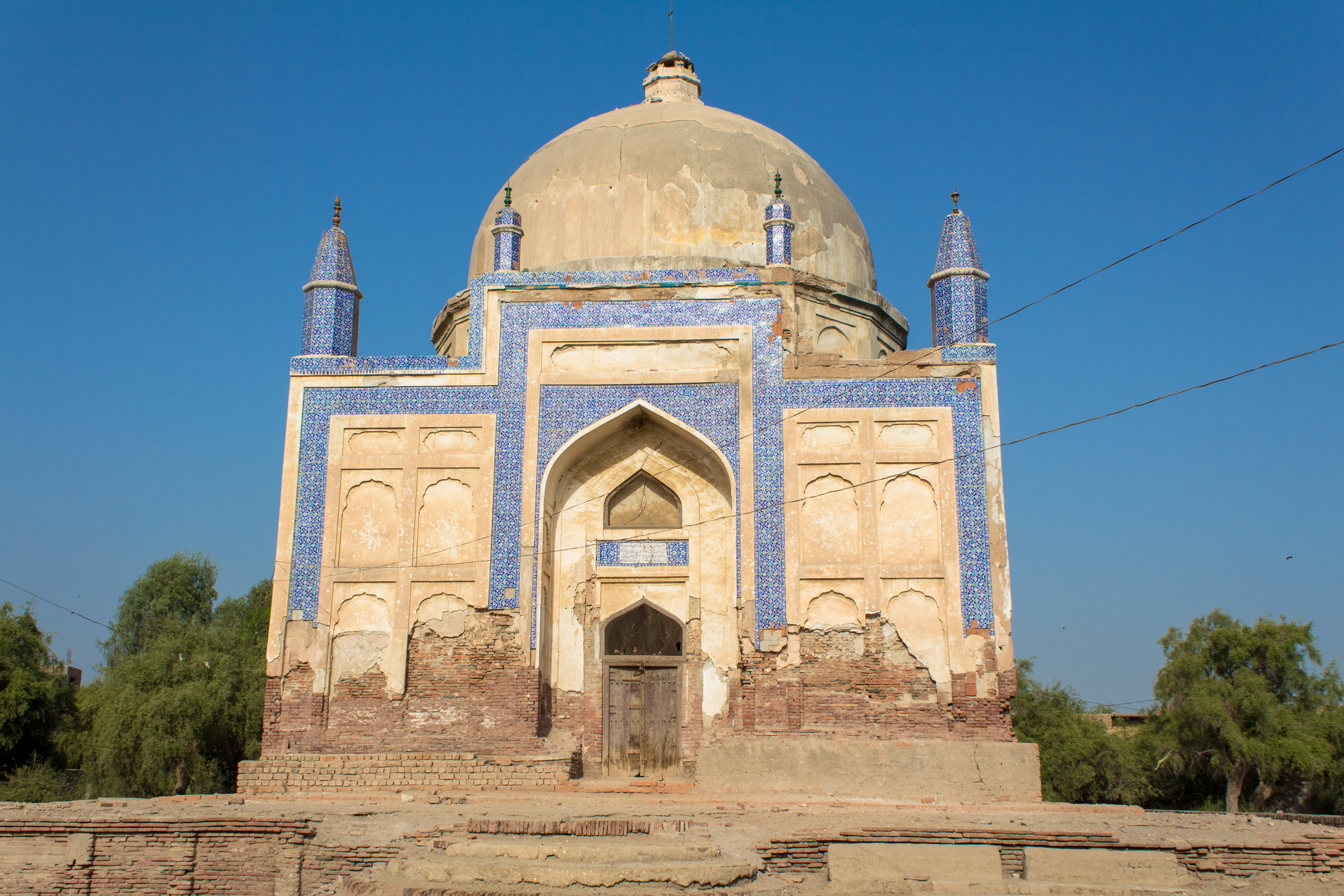
The tomb of Shah Baharo.

== Geography ==
Larkana is situated at 27°33'30"N 68°12'40"E. It is in the northwest part of Sindh and it has its own division. It is also included in Upper Sindh.

== Climate ==
Larkana has a hot desert climate (Köppen climate classification BWh), bordering a hot semi arid climate (Koppen: BSh), with sweltering summers and mild winters. The highest recorded temperature is 53.0 °C (127.4 °F), recorded On 26 May 2010 and the lowest recorded temperature is −4 °C (24.8 °F), recorded in January 1929. The average annual rainfall is 237.4 mm (9.35 in), and mainly occurs in the monsoon season (July to September). The highest annual rainfall ever is 988.7 mm (38.93 in), recorded in 2022 (some areas of the city got more than 1000 mm of annual rainfall in 2022) and the lowest annual rainfall ever is 7.1 mm (0.28 in), recorded in 1938.

Climate data for Larkana
Month	Jan	Feb	Mar	Apr	May	Jun	Jul	Aug	Sep	Oct	Nov	Dec	Year
Record high °C (°F)	29.2 (84.6)	36.0 (96.8)	44.8 (112.6)	51.0 (123.8)	53.0 (127.4)	51.0 (123.8)	47.5 (117.5)	44.0 (111.2)	43.0 (109.4)	41.0 (105.8)	37.0 (98.6)	32.2 (90.0)	53.0 (127.4)
Mean daily maximum °C (°F)	24.8 (76.6)	26.3 (79.3)	32.3 (90.1)	39.0 (102.2)	43.9 (111.0)	44.0 (111.2)	41.4 (106.5)	38.0 (100.4)	37.0 (98.6)	34.5 (94.1)	30.5 (86.9)	24.8 (76.6)	34.7 (94.5)
Daily mean °C (°F)	17.0 (62.6)	18.4 (65.1)	24.0 (75.2)	29.9 (85.8)	34.7 (94.5)	35.9 (96.6)	34.0 (93.2)	32.3 (90.1)	30.9 (87.6)	27.5 (81.5)	22.6 (72.7)	17.0 (62.6)	27.0 (80.6)
Mean daily minimum °C (°F)	9.3 (48.7)	10.6 (51.1)	15.8 (60.4)	20.9 (69.6)	25.6 (78.1)	27.8 (82.0)	27.7 (81.9)	26.7 (80.1)	24.9 (76.8)	20.6 (69.1)	14.8 (58.6)	9.3 (48.7)	19.5 (67.1)
Record low °C (°F)	−1.1 (30.0)	0.0 (32.0)	4.3 (39.7)	10.8 (51.4)	14.4 (57.9)	18.3 (64.9)	21.5 (70.7)	19.2 (66.6)	20.5 (68.9)	13.0 (55.4)	6.1 (43.0)	0.0 (32.0)	−1.1 (30.0)
Average rainfall mm (inches)	8.7 (0.34)	7.0 (0.28)	9.0 (0.35)	14.5 (0.57)	2.5 (0.10)	29.3 (1.15)	59.8 (2.35)	55.2 (2.17)	27.0 (1.06)	5.9 (0.23)	1.2 (0.05)	8.9 (0.35)	229 (9)
Average rainy days	0.6	0.5	1.0	0.7	0.2	1.7	3.3	2.2	1.2	0.3	0.1	0.4	12.2
Source: PMD (1991-2020)

== Famous Crops ==
Rice is the most famous crop of Larkana. Peas, Grape, Mustard, and Sunflowers are also grown there.

== Demographics ==
=== Population ===
Historical population

Year	Pop.	±% p.a.
1951	33,247	—
1961	48,008	+3.74%
1972	71,893	+3.74%
1981	123,890	+6.23%

Year	Pop.	±% p.a.
1998	270,283	+4.70%
2017	490,508	+3.19%
2023	551,716	+1.98%

According to the 2023 census, Larkana had a population of 551,716.

=== Languages ===
1. Sindhi (99.3%)
2. Others (0.70%)

According to 2023 Pakistani census Larkana is predominantly Sindhi about 99.3 percent of population of Larkana city spoke Sindhi as their mother tongue while other small minorities 0.7 others also lived in this city mostly Brahuis and Baloch.

=== Religion ===
Religious groups in Larkana City (1881−2023)
Religious group	1881		1891		1901		1911		1921		1931		1941		2017		2023	
Religious group	Pop.	%	Pop.	%	Pop.	%	Pop.	%	Pop.	%	Pop.	%	Pop.	%	Pop.	%	Pop.	%
Islam	7,402	56.13%	5,580	46.43%	6,173	42.45%	6,434	39.97%	6,923	39.06%	10,945	40.78%	7,834	27.89%	473,847	97.1%	536,127	97.17%
Hinduism (Note: Includes Castes (Hindu Jati), Scheduled Castes, Scheduled Castes and Scheduled Tribes/Tribals, Nanakpanthis, Prarthana Samaj, and Brahmoism.)	5,779	43.82%	6,422	53.43%	8,314	57.17%	9,601	59.64%	10,727	60.53%	15,696	58.48%	19,949	71.03%	12,977	2.66%	13,365	2.42%
Zoroastrianism	5	0.04%	8	0.07%	1	0.01%	1	0.01%	0	0%	3	0.01%	0	0%	—N/a	—N/a	1	0%
Christianity	2	0.02%	9	0.07%	21	0.14%	13	0.08%	10	0.06%	7	0.03%	49	0.17%	1,026	0.21%	2,030	0.37%
Judaism	0	0%	0	0%	11	0.08%	0	0%	9	0.05%	7	0.03%	0	0%	—N/a	—N/a	—N/a	—N/a
Jainism	0	0%	0	0%	0	0%	0	0%	0	0%	0	0%	0	0%	—N/a	—N/a	—N/a	—N/a
Buddhism	0	0%	0	0%	0	0%	0	0%	0	0%	0	0%	0	0%	—N/a	—N/a	—N/a	—N/a
Sikhism	—N/a	—N/a	—N/a	—N/a	—N/a	—N/a	48	0.3%	54	0.3%	170	0.63%	253	0.9%	—N/a	—N/a	27	0%
Ahmadiyya	—N/a	—N/a	—N/a	—N/a	—N/a	—N/a	—N/a	—N/a	—N/a	—N/a	—N/a	—N/a	—N/a	—N/a	140	0.03%	113	0.02%
Others	0	0%	0	0%	23	0.16%	0	0%	0	0%	13	0.05%	0	0%	16	0%	53	0.01%
Total population	13,188	100%	12,019	100%	14,543	100%	16,097	100%	17,723	100%	26,841	100%	28,085	100%	488,006	100%	551,716	100%
1881–1941: Data for the entirety of the town of Larkana, which included Larkana Municipality. 2017–2023: Urban population of Larkana Taluka.

== Education ==
Several old and new schools, colleges, as well as university are functioning in the city for both boys and girls. Many are private and public institutions. IBA has takeover Public School and from 2018, Agha Khan University Education Board will takeover Sindh Board

=== Schools, colleges and training institutes ===
Local schools include Government Pilot School, Larkana (founded in 1926 by the British colonists), Girls High School, Public School Larkana, Deeni Madersa High School, and Government Degree College. Technical institutes include Polytechnic Institute and Teachers' Training College.

(UN ECOSOC accredited organization) has established STEVTA registered technical and vocational training institute for girls in 2017. DESSI International imparts free trainings along with giving monthly stipends through NAVTTC and BBSHRRDB/BBSYDP projects in Larkana since 2017. DESSI International also provides training programs of Beautician, Diploma in IT, Computers, Dress Making, Rilli Applique, Spoken and Business English, Chinese language and other different short and professional courses in Larkana.

=== University and campuses ===
- University of Larkano
- Shaheed Mohtarma Benazir Bhutto Medical University
- Shaheed Zulfiqar Ali Bhutto Institute of Science and Technology campus
- Chandka Medical College

SZABIST opened its first campus in Larkana in 2004. It offers degrees in BBA (day), BA (day), MBA (evening), EMBA. A few years later the SZABIST Trust established two school and college in the city: Montessori to Class VII (Junior School) and Class VIII to XII (School and College).

Chandka Medical College (CMC) was established and inaugurated by the former prime minister of Pakistan Zulfiqar Ali Bhutto on 20 April 1973. It was the fourth public medical college to be established in the province of Sindh. Chandka Medical College is recognised by Pakistan Medical & Dental Council (PMDC). The College of Physicians & Surgeons Pakistan (CPSP) has also established its regional center at the campus of CMC Larkana. CMC is recently upgraded to Shaheed Mohtarma Benazir Bhutto Medical University. In 2009, Quaid-e-Awam University College of Engineering Science & Technology (QUCEST), Larkano, was established in the outskirt of Larkana, under the directives of Government of Sindh in collaboration with Quaid-e-Awam University of Engineering Science & Technology (QUEST), Nawabshah, Sindh. The campus offers bachelor of engineering degrees in the technologies of civil engineering, mechanical engineering, electronic engineering and electrical engineering.

In 2024, University of Larkano, established a merger of Sindh University Campus, Quaid-e-Awam University College of Engineering Science & Technology (QUCEST) and Shaheed Zulfiqar Ali Bhutto Agricultural College (SZBAC) to its faculties.

== Transport ==
Larkana Railway Station is located in the center of the city. It connects Larkana to the rest of Sindh and Pakistan. Pakistan Railway also assists in the transportation of agricultural products to provincial capital Karachi from Larkana. Moenjodaro Airport is located near Mohenjo-daro, 28 km away to the south of the city of Larkana, about 5 kilometres away from Dokri.

Larkana is connected via land buses to most major cities in the country, including Karachi, Islamabad, Hyderabad and Quetta.

== Sport ==
Larkana was the birthplace of the Sindh Games. It also hosted the 12th Sindh Games in 2009 which included sports such as football, gymnastics, hockey, judo, karate, squash, table tennis, tennis, volleyball, weightlifting, and wushu. It also included traditional games such as kodi kodi, malakhara, shooting and wanjhwatti. Larkana was also home to cricket team Larkana Bulls.

The Larkana Tennis Association provides the only tennis court in Larkana, and coaches boys coming from various other cities.

== Notable people ==
- Muhammad Tahir - Founder of Jamaat Islah ul Muslimeen Pakistan, Roohani Talaba Jamaat Pakistan & Sajjada Nasheen Dargah Allah Abad Shareef Kandiaro, Sindh
- Jan Mohammad Abbasi – Vice President of Jamaat-e-Islami Pakistan
- Abdul Ghafoor Bhurgri – lawyer, politician, writer
- Abdul-Majid Bhurgri – developer of computing in the Sindhi
- Benazir Bhutto – former prime minister of Pakistan
- Fatima Bhutto – novelist, journalist
- Mumtaz Ali Bhutto – former governor, Chief Minister of Sindh and federal minister
- Murtaza Bhutto – founder of the PPP Shaheed Bhutto; son of Z. A Bhutto
- Shah Nawaz Bhutto – prime minister of State of Jhunagarah, prominent landowner, politician, initiator and mover of Sukkur Barrage; father of Z. A Bhutto
- Zulfikar Ali Bhutto – former president and prime minister of Pakistan
- Sobho Gianchandani – lawyer and scholar
- Muhammad Ayub Khuhro – former chief minister of Sindh, former defense minister of Pakistan
- Rauf Lala – comedian
- Abida Parveen – Sufi singer
- Bashir Ahmed Qureshi – chairman of the Jeay Sindh Qaumi Mahaz (JSQM)
- Muhammad Sharif – ex-Federal Secretary and Home Minister Sindh
- Qazi Fazlullah Ubaidullah – former chief minister of Sindh and Federal Minister
- Khalid Mehmood Soomro former senator of (JUI)
- Shahnawaz Dahani – Cricketer

== See also ==
- Larkana District
- History of Larkana
- Jinnah Bagh, Larkana
- 2014 Larkana temple attack
- Mohen-jo-daro
- Larkana Bulls
- Abida Parveen
- Sohai Ali Abro
- Indus Valley civilization
- List of Indus Valley Civilization sites
- List of inventions and discoveries of the Indus Valley Civilization
- Hydraulic engineering of the Indus Valley Civilization

== Bibliography ==
- Jonah Blank; Christopher Clary; Brian Nichiporuk (30 October 2014), Drivers of Long-Term Insecurity and Instability in Pakistan: Urbanization, Rand Corporation, ISBN 978-0-8330-8750-8
