= Aamir Mehmood Kiani =

Pakistani politician

Additional General Secretary of IPP
- In office 12 June 2023 – 20 July 2025
- President: Aleem Khan
- Succeeded by: Gul Asghar Khan Baghoor

Secretary-General of the PTI
- In office 19 July 2019 – 25 December 2021
- Prime Minister: Imran Khan
- Succeeded by: Asad Umar

Federal Minister for National Health Services, Regulation and Coordination
- In office 20 August 2018 – 18 April 2019
- President: Mamnoon Hussain; Arif Alvi
- Prime Minister: Imran Khan
- Preceded by: Muhammad Yusuf Shaikh (caretaker)
- Succeeded by: Zafar Mirza

Member of the National Assembly of Pakistan
- In office 13 August 2018 – 20 January 2023
- Constituency: NA-61 (Rawalpindi-V)

President of PTI North Punjab
- In office 4 June 2022 – 17 May 2023
- Chairman: Imran Khan
- Preceded by: Sadaqat Ali Abbasi

Personal details
- Born: Rawalpindi, Punjab, Pakistan

Aamir Mehmood Kiani (Urdu: عامر محمود کیانی) is a Pakistani politician who served as Federal Minister for National Health Services, Regulation and Coordination, from 20 August 2018 to 18 April 2019. He had been a member of the National Assembly of Pakistan from August 2018 till January 2023.

Having been associated with Imran Khan and his Pakistan Tehreek-e-Insaf (PTI) party since 1996, Kiani eventually quit it in the aftermath of the May 9 riots, perceived as attacks on Pakistan's military institutions coordinated by Imran Khan, while Kiani asserted that he belongs to a military family and couldn't pursue such politics.

Like numerous former PTI leaders, Kiani is now associated with the Istehkam-e-Pakistan Party (IPP), being its Secretary-General.

== Early life ==
Kiani was born in Rawalpindi into a family with military background.

Before entering electoral political he had been an advocate by profession.

== Political career ==
=== Pakistan Tehreek-e-Insaf (1996-2023) ===
==== Early career and electoral setbacks ====
Kiani ran for a seat of the National Assembly of Pakistan as a candidate of the Pakistan Tehreek-e-Insaf (PTI) from NA-56 Rawalpindi-VII in the 2002 Pakistani general election, but was unsuccessful. He received 3,182 votes and lost to Sheikh Rasheed Ahmad, an independent candidate.

Ahmad vacated the seat in favour of NA-55 Rawalpindi-VI, another seat he won, and Kiani ran as an independent candidate for the subsequent by-election in NA-56 Rawalpindi-VII, but was again unsuccessful. He received 139 votes and was defeated by Hanif Abbasi, a candidate of the Muttahida Majlis-e-Amal (MMA).

==== Electoral success and ministerial positions ====
He was elected to the National Assembly of Pakistan as a candidate of Pakistan Tehreek-e-Insaf (PTI) from Constituency NA-61 (Rawalpindi-V) in 2018 Pakistani general election. He received 105,000 votes and defeated Malik Ibrar Ahmed.

On 18 August, Imran Khan formally announced his federal cabinet structure and Kiani was named as Minister for National Health Services, Regulations and Coordination. On 20 August 2018, he was sworn in as Federal Minister for National Health Services, Regulations and Coordination in the federal cabinet of Prime Minister Imran Khan. On 18 April 2019, in a mega reshuffle, Prime Minister Imran Khan took his post down due to public pressure of medicine price increase.

==== Quitting the party ====
On 17 May 2023, in the context of the May 9 riots, Kiani announced that he had left the PTI and politics, as he belonged to a military family and couldn't stand Imran Khan's perceived anti-army stance. This came after days of violent crackdown on protesters supporting PTI. Many office-holders of PTI were arrested in violation of court orders. An estimated 50 people had been shot by police and paramilitary forces and thousands had been arrested and detained without charge, including women and children.

== Legal cases ==
=== Corruption allegations (2023) ===
On March 15, 2023, the Islamabad High Court (IHC) granted protective bail to PTI leader Aamir Mehmood Kiani and his son Fahad Kayani in a corruption case filed by the Anti-Corruption Establishment of Rawalpindi. The bail was granted on the grounds that the petitioners intended to appear before the trial court, and there was concern they might be arrested without this protection. Kiani’s legal counsel Ali Bukhari argued the case was registered with malafide intent and asked the court for bail to enable voluntary court appearance. The Chief Justice directed Kiani to approach the Anti-Corruption Court within 10 days, while Justice Farooq restrained police from arresting him until March 25, the date the protective bail would lapse.
