= Goth Gorshani =

- Location within Pakistan
- Coordinates: 28.43°N 68.15°E
- Country: Pakistan
- Province: Balochistan
- Time zone: UTC+5 (PST)

Goth Gorshani is a populated place located in Balochistan, on the route between the city of Quetta to Larkana in Sindh in Pakistan. It is located at 28°43'0N 68°15'0E. The name of the place is derived from a figure of Sufism.
