= Diploma of Associate Engineer =

Pakistani vocational certificate

Diploma of Associate Engineer or DAE is a three years Post-Matric grade 10 program, equivalent to grade 12 Intermediate, of instructions in various engineering disciplines. It includes regular studies having classroom lectures, theoretical exams and practicals, workshop assignments, lab experiments, industrial projects and industrial tours. Diploma of Associate Engineer (DAE) is awarded by the Punjab, Khyber Pakhtunkhwa (KPBTE), Sindh Board of Technical Education and (FBISE) Federal Board of Intermediate and Secondary Education (Fbise.edu.pk) and is offered in various engineering disciplines such as electrical engineering, electronics engineering, civil engineering, mechanical engineering, chemical engineering, biomedical engineering and petroleum engineering etc. A student can take admission in DAE after passing Secondary School Certificate (SSC) in science subjects or Technical School Certificate (TSC). Government of Pakistan recognises the DAE as equivalent to Higher Secondary School Certificate (HSSC) pre-engineering for further study purpose.

== Background ==
DAE, which was first developed in 1950 has a three years duration. Diploma holders are often called associate engineers or sub engineers in Pakistan. Hundreds of government and private institutes across Pakistan offer this diploma. After successful completion, students can either join Bachelor of Engineering (BE) and Bachelor of Technology (BTech) degree programs or find employment as supervisors, foremen, technicians, sub-engineers, draftsmen, overseers, chemical or gas plant operators, junior instructors or workshop superintendents.

== Regional variations ==
- At the federal level, the National Vocational and Technical Training Commission is the responsible government body for technical education.
- In the Punjab, the Punjab Board of Technical Education and the Technical Education and Vocational Training Authority are the responsible government bodies for technical education.
- In Sindh, the Sindh Board of Technical Education and the Sindh Technical Education and Vocational Training Authority are the responsible government bodies for technical education.
- In Khyber Pakhtunkhwa, the Khyber Pakhtunkhwa Board of Technical Education and the Technical Education and Vocational Training Authority are the responsible government bodies for technical education.
- In Balochistan, the Balochistan Technical Education and Vocational Training Authority is the responsible government body for technical education.
- In Azad Kashmir, the Azad Jammu & Kashmir Technical Education and Vocational Training Authority is the responsible government body for technical education.
