= Qamar-ul-Islam Raja =

Pakistani politician

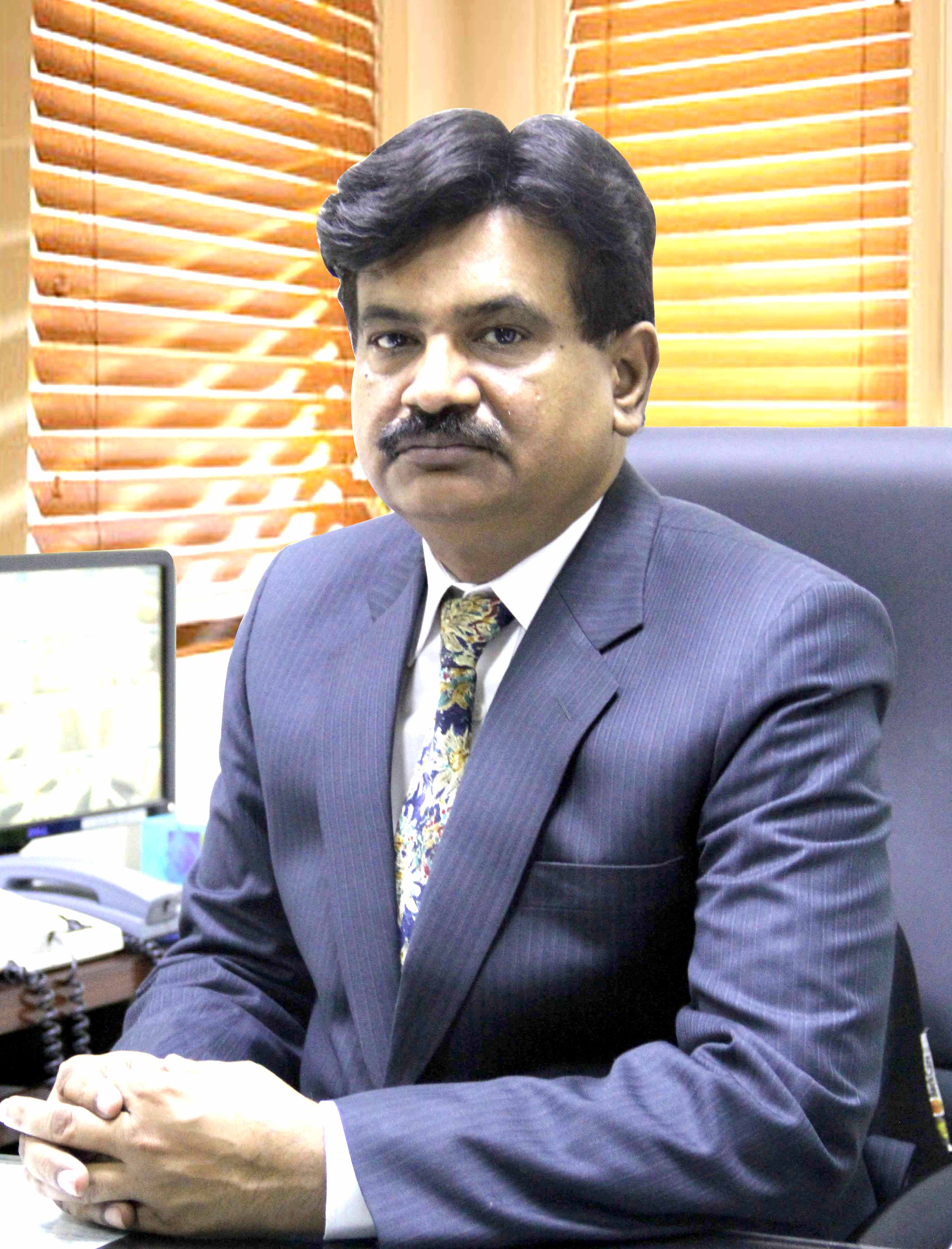

Member of the National Assembly
- Incumbent
- Assumed office 19 April 2022
- Constituency: NA-53 Rawalpindi-II

Chairman of NAVTTC
- Incumbent
- Assumed office 29 June 2026
- Preceded by: Gulmina Bilal Ahmad

Personal details
- Born: 6 December 1964 (age 61) Rawalpindi, Punjab, Pakistan
- Party: PMLN (2008-present)

Qamar-ul-Islam Raja is a Pakistani politician who is a member of the National Assembly of Pakistan since February 2024. He also served as a member of the Provincial Assembly of the Punjab from June 2008 to May 2018. He has been serving as the Chairman of the National Vocational and Technical Training Commission (NAVTTC) since June 2026.

== Early life and education ==
Raja was born on 6 December 1964 in Rawalpindi.

He graduated in 1987 from University of the Punjab. He married in 1995 and has two daughters and one son. He obtained a Bachelor of Science in Civil Engineering in 1989 from University of Engineering and Technology, Lahore.

In 2001, he completed a Postgraduate Diploma in Computer Sciences. He obtained a Master of Science in 2005 and a Master of Philosophy in Mass Communication in 2009.

== Career ==
Raja was elected to the Provincial Assembly of the Punjab as a candidate of Pakistan Muslim League (Q) (PML-Q) from Constituency PP-5 (Rawalpindi-V) in the 2008 Pakistani general election. He received 34,252 votes and defeated Raja Anwar, a candidate of Pakistan Muslim League (N) (PML-N).

He was re-elected to the Provincial Assembly of the Punjab as a candidate of PML-N from Constituency PP-5 (Rawalpindi-V) in the 2013 Pakistani general election. He received 65,445 votes and with the highest lead in the provincial assembly of the Punjab he defeated Malik Sohail Ashraf, a candidate of PML-Q. During this period, he served as the chairperson of the Punjab Education Foundation.

In the 2024 Pakistani general elections, he was again a candidate of Pakistan Muslim League (N) for the National Assembly seat for the constituency NA-53 (Rawalpindi-II).
