= NA-53 Rawalpindi-II =

Constituency of the National Assembly of Pakistan

- Constituency for the National Assembly of Pakistan
- Region: Rawalpindi Tehsil (partly) of Rawalpindi District
- Electorate: 357,199

Current constituency
- Party: Pakistan Muslim League (N)
- Member: Qamar-ul-Islam Raja
- Created from: NA-52 (Rawalpindi-III)

NA-53 Rawalpindi-II (این اے-53، راولپنڈی-2) is a constituency for the National Assembly of Pakistan.

== Area ==
The constituency consists of Gulzar-e-Quaid, Dhoke Lalyal, Railway Housing Scheme 1-A Chaklala, Dhok Chaudrian, Shakrial, Lalazar, Sher Zaman Colony, Morgah, Gulrez, Safari Villas, Police Foundation, Media Town, Lalkurti, Kotha Kalan, Gulshan Abad, Bahria Town (1,2,3,7,8), Rawat, Kalar Syedah, Munawar, Zulfiqar, Chak Beli Khan, Pindori and Army Officers colony.

== Members of Parliament ==
=== 1970–1977: NW-28 Rawalpindi-III ===
Election	Member	Party
1970	Habib Ahmad	PPP

=== 1977–2002: NA-38 Rawalpindi-III ===
Election	Member	Party
1977	Syed Ali Asghar Shah	PPP
1985	Shaikh Rasheed Ahmad	Independent
1988	Shaikh Rasheed Ahmad	IJI
1990	Shaikh Rasheed Ahmad	IJI
1993	Shaikh Rasheed Ahmad	PML-N
1997	Shaikh Rasheed Ahmad	PML-N

=== 2002–2018: NA-52 Rawalpindi-III ===
Election	Member	Party
2002	Chaudhry Nisar Ali Khan	PML-N
2008	Chaudhry Nisar Ali Khan	PML-N
2008 by-election	Muhammad Safdar	PML-N
2013	Chaudhry Nisar Ali Khan	PML-N

=== 2018–2023: NA-59 Rawalpindi-III ===
Election	Member	Party
2018	Ghulam Sarwar Khan	PTI

=== 2024–present: NA-53 Rawalpindi-II ===
Election	Member	Party
2024	Qamar-ul-Islam Raja	PML-N

== Detailed results ==
=== Election 2002 ===
General elections were held on 10 October 2002. Chaudhary Nisar Ali Khan of PML-N won by 73,671 votes.

General election 2002: NA-52 Rawalpindi-III
Party	Candidate	Votes	%	±%
PML(N)	Chaudhary Nisar Ali Khan	73,671	51.05	
PML(Q)	Muhammad Nasir Raja	56,645	39.25	
PPP	Muhammad Saghir Khokhar	11,684	8.10	
Independent	Sakhawat Hussain	2,310	1.60	
Turnout		150,008	48.89	
Total valid votes		144,310	96.20	
Rejected ballots		5,698	3.80	
Majority		17,026	11.80	
Registered electors		306,853		

=== Election 2008 ===
Nisar Ali Khan successfully retained his native National Assembly seat in elections 2008.

General election 2008: NA-52 Rawalpindi-III
Party	Candidate	Votes	%	±%
PML(N)	Chaudhary Nisar Ali Khan	97,747	50.61	
PML(Q)	Muhammad Nasir Raja	54,988	28.47	
PPP	Khurram Pervaiz Raja	38,052	19.70	
Others	Others (six candidates)	2,351	1.22	
Turnout		196,521	52.28	
Total valid votes		193,138	98.28	
Rejected ballots		3,383	1.72	
Majority		42,759	22.14	
Registered electors		375,934		
PML(N) hold				

=== By-Election 2008 ===
By-Election 2008: NA-52 Rawalpindi-III
Party	Candidate	Votes	%	±%
PML(N)	Muhammad Safdar	54,917	69.36	
PML(Q)	Muhammad Nasir Raja	22,773	28.76	
Others	Others (five candidates)	1,485	1.88	
Turnout		79,175	21.06	
Total valid votes		79,175	100	
Rejected ballots		0	0	
Majority		32,144	40.60	
Registered electors		375,934		
PML(N) hold				

=== Election 2013 ===
General elections were held on 11 May 2013. Nisar Ali Khan of PML-N was yet again successful in retaining his native National Assembly Constituency and he won it with a huge margin. National Assembly.

General election 2013: NA-52 Rawalpindi-III
Party	Candidate	Votes	%	±%
PML(N)	Chaudhary Nisar Ali Khan	133,143	52.04	
PTI	Ajmal Sabir Raja	69,769	27.27	
PML(Q)	Muhammad Basharat Raja	43,866	17.15	
Others	Others (twelve candidates)	9,050	3.54	
Turnout		260,157	57.15	
Total valid votes		255,828	98.34	
Rejected ballots		4,329	1.66	
Majority		63,374	24.77	
Registered electors		455,186		
PML(N) hold				

=== Election 2018 ===
General elections were held on 25 July 2018.

General election 2018: NA-59 Rawalpindi-III
Party	Candidate	Votes	%	±%
PTI	Ghulam Sarwar Khan	89,055	42.41	
Independent	Chaudhry Nisar Ali Khan	66,369	31.61	
PML(N)	Qamar-ul-Islam Raja	21,754	10.36	
TLP	Malik Muhammad Taj	14,320	6.82	
Others	Others (six candidates)	10,815	5.15	
Turnout		209,974	58.78	
Rejected ballots		7,661	3.65	
Majority		22,686	10.80	
Registered electors		357,199		
PTI gain from PML(N)				

=== Election 2024 ===
General elections were held on 8 February 2024. Qamar-ul-Islam Raja won the election with 72,006 votes.

General election 2024: NA-53 Rawalpindi-II
Party	Candidate	Votes	%	±%
PML(N)	Qamar-ul-Islam Raja	72,006	34.64	▲24.28
PTI	Ajmal Sabir Raja (Note: Filed nomination papers as PTI candidate but ECP allowed him to run as an Independent)	58,480	28.14	▼14.27
Independent	Chaudhary Nisar Ali Khan	44,074	21.21	▼10.40
TLP	Muhammad Taimoor Khalid	21,522	10.36	▲3.54
Others	Others (seventeen candidates)	11,759	5.66	
Turnout		213,022	53.07	▼5.71
Total valid votes		207,841	97.57	
Rejected ballots		5,181	2.43	
Majority		13,526	6.51	
Registered electors		401,376		
PML(N) gain from PTI				

== See also ==
- NA-52 Rawalpindi-I
- NA-54 Rawalpindi-III
