= Saint Joseph's Catholic Church Larkana =

Catholic church in Pakistan

Religion
- Affiliation: Roman Catholic
- Diocese: Diocese of Larkana
- Ecclesiastical or organizational status: Active
- Leadership: Bishop Yaqoob Gill
- Year consecrated: 1984

Location
- Location: Larkana, Sindh, Pakistan

Architecture
- Architect: Pakistani
- Style: Anglo European
- Groundbreaking: 1985
- Completed: 1984

Specifications
- Capacity: 400
- Length: 500 feet
- Width: 300 feet

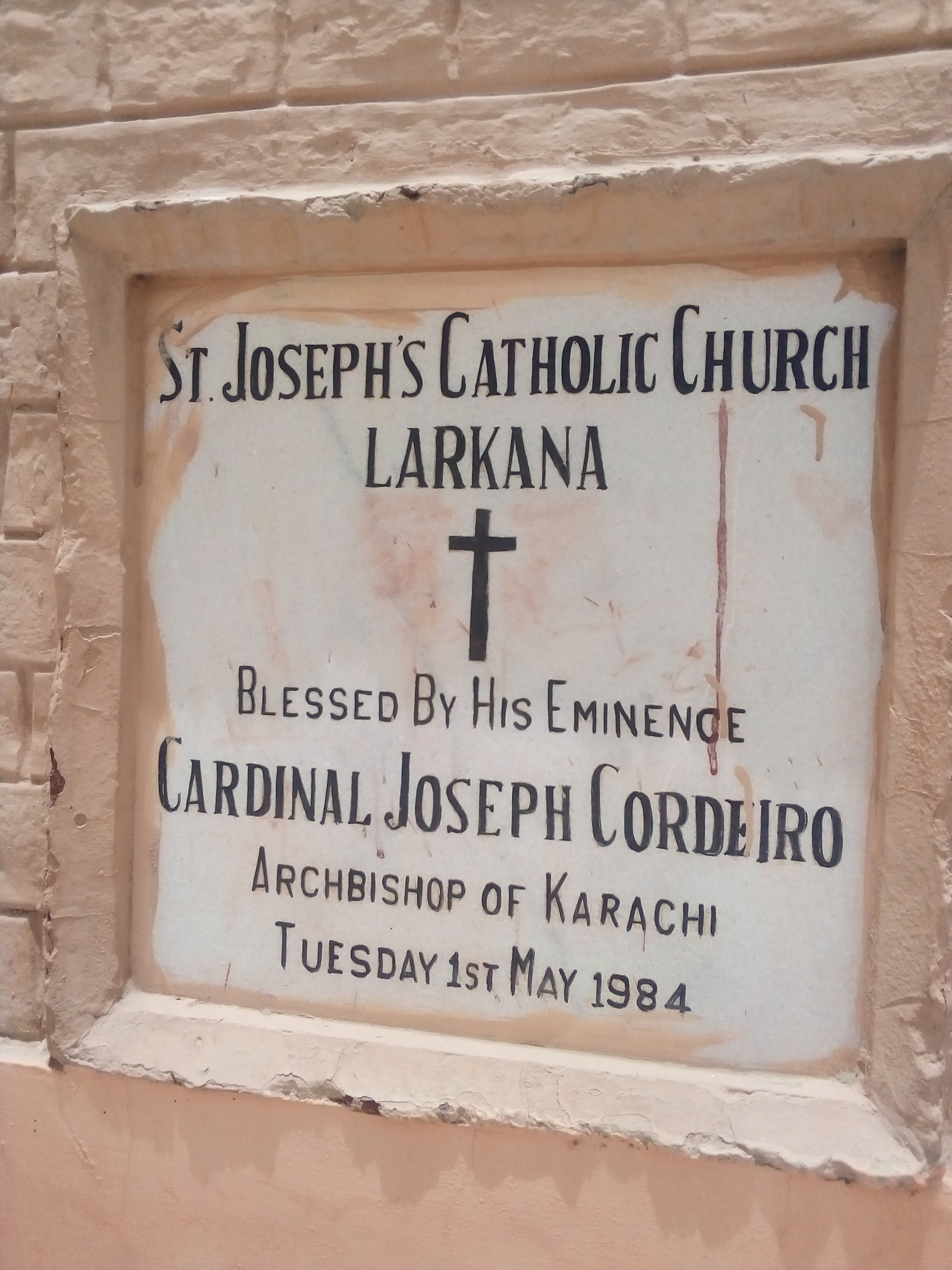
Founded plaque of the Church of Larkana

The Saint Joseph's Catholic Church, Larkana is the only Catholic church in Larkana, Sindh, Pakistan. The church was built in 1984.

Inauguration Plaque of Sepulchre of Merry

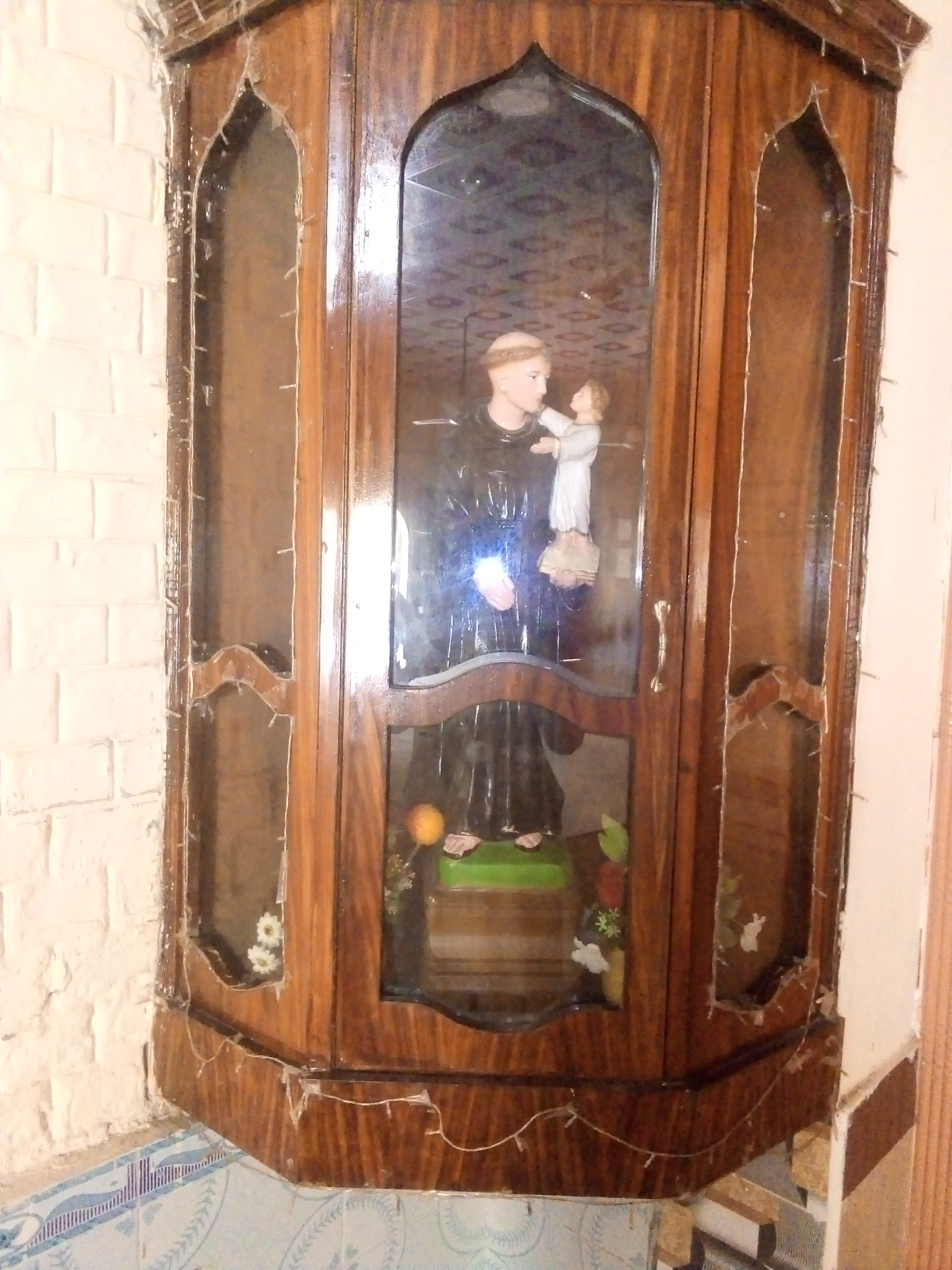
Church of Larkana inside view
