= Larkana Tehsil =

Coordinates: 27.5500°N 68.2000°E

Larkana Tehsil تعلقہ لاڑکانہ لاڙڪانو تعلقو
- Taluka (Tehsil)
- Interactive map of Larkana Tehsil
- Country: Pakistan
- Region: Sindh
- District: Dadu District
- Capital: Larkana
- Union councils: 18

Government
  - Assistant Commissioner: Mazhar ali janwari

Area
  - Total: 549 km^{2} (212 sq mi)

Population (2023)
  - Total: 873,868
  - Density: 1,590/km^{2} (4,120/sq mi)
- Time zone: UTC+5 (PST)

Larkana Tehsil is an administrative subdivision (tehsil) of Larkana District in the Sindh province of Pakistan. The city of Larkana is the capital.

== History ==
During British rule, Larkana became the headquarters of Larkana District and Larkana Taluka - and for a time was part of the Bombay Presidency of British India.

The Imperial Gazetteer of India, written over a century ago during British rule, describes the taluka as follows:

== Administration ==
The Assistant Commissioner of Taluka Larkana is Mr. Ahmed Ali Soomro. Larkana Taluka is administratively subdivided into 18 Union Councils.

== See also ==
- History of Larkana
