= Government Pilot School, Larkana =

Government Pilot Higher Secondary School, Larkana
- Larkana, Sindh; Pakistan

Information
- School type: Government school
- Motto: Enter to Read, Leave to Lead
- Founded: 1919; 107 years ago
- School board: Larkana Board of Intermediate and Secondary Education
- Principal: Professor Zahid Hussain Hulio
- Teaching staff: 150+
- Gender: Boys
- Enrollment: 8000+
- Classes: 50+
- Language: English And Sindhi
- Hours in school day: 5
- Slogan: "Enter To Read, Leave To Lead"
- Sports: Association football, cricket

Government Pilot Higher Secondary School is a government school located in Larkana, Sindh. It is one of oldest schools in Sindh.

== History ==
Government Pilot Higher Secondary School was built in 1919 by the British in what was then British India. The land for the school was donated by Khanbahadur Ameer Ali Lahori. After Pakistan came into being, the school changed its affiliation from the University of Bombay to the University of Sindh.

In 1964, under a President's Project it was renamed as Govt Pilot Secondary School with addition of four workshops, namely electrical, metal, typing, and wood.

During the premiership of Benazir Bhutto it was upgraded under a Prime Minister's Programme and was renamed as Govt Pilot Higher Secondary School.

== Facilities ==
The original E-shaped building which represents England remains structurally intact and free from any damage. It contains 81 rooms, which are currently used as classrooms, offices, laboratories, a drawing hall, an auditorium, and a library.

== Notable alumni ==
- Ashraf Abbasi, the first woman deputy speaker of the National Assembly
- Ahmed Ali Sheikh, Chief Justice of the Sindh High Court
- Nisar Khuhro
