= Quaid-e-Awam University of Engineering, Science & Technology =

University in Pakistan

Coordinates: 26.235938°N 68.390067°E

Quaid-e-Awam University of Engineering, Sciences & Technology
- قائد عوام یونیورسٹی آف انجینئرنگ، سائنس اینڈ ٹیکنالوجی، نوابشاہ
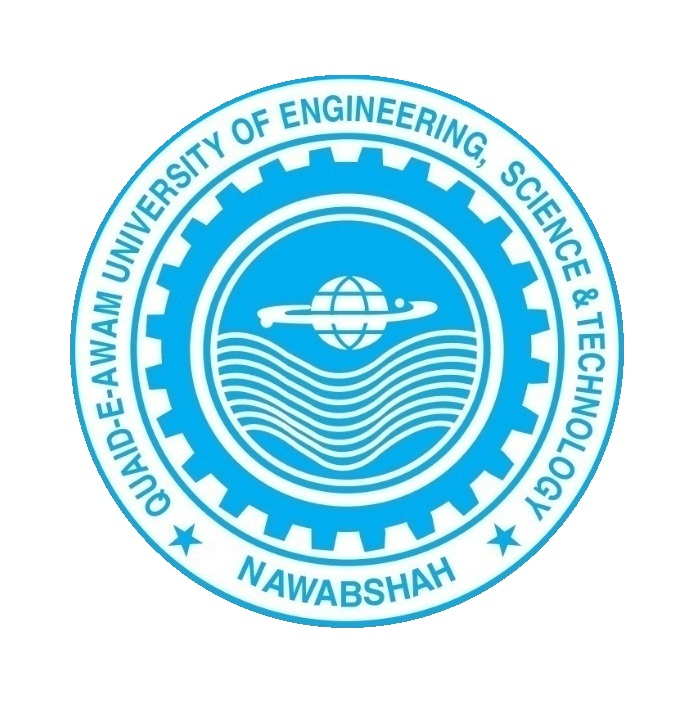
- Former names: Mehran university's College of Engineering & technology
- Motto in English: To provide quality and state-of-the-art education
- Type: Public
- Established: 1974
- Affiliations: Higher Education Commission (Pakistan); Pakistan Engineering Council
- Chancellor: Governor of Sindh
- Vice-Chancellor: Prof. Dr. Saleem Raza Samo
- Provost: Aamir Bhutto
- Dean: Prof. Dr Abdullah Saand
- Director: Intesab Hussain Sadhayo
- Students: ~4200
- Undergraduates: ~3800
- Postgraduates: ~400
- Doctoral students: ~30
- Location: Alishah Town, University Road, Nawabshah, Sindh, Pakistan
- Campus: Urban
- Colours: Blue and white
- Nickname: QUEST
- Mascot: QUESTIAN
- Website: quest.edu.pk

The Quaid-e-Awam University of Engineering, Sciences & Technology (Sindhi: قائد عوام یونیورسٹی آف انجینئرنگ، سائنس اینڈ ٹیکنالوجی) often referred to as 'QUEST', is a public technical and research university located in the urban neighborhood of Nawabshah, Sindh, Pakistan.

It ranks as the 7th best university among engineering universities in Pakistan. The university is named after the former Prime Minister of Pakistan, Zulfikar Ali Bhutto (Quaid-e-Awam). Abdul Rehman Memon was the founding vice chancellor who was a professor of electrical engineering at the Mehran University of Engineering and Technology where he had served as the vice chancellor.

This university is recognised by the Higher Education Commission of Pakistan.

== Academic Departments ==
The following:

- Department of Artificial Intelligence
- Department of Automation and Control Engineering
- Department of Agro-Food Processing Engineering Technology
- Department of Basic Sciences And Related Studies
- Department of Chemical Engineering
- Department of Civil Engineering
- Department of Computer Science
- Department of Computer Systems Engineering
- Department of Electrical Engineering
- Department of Electronic Engineering
- Department of Energy & Environmental Engineering
- Department of Energy systems Engineering
- Department of Environmental Engineering
- Department of English (Language and Literature)
- Department of Information Technology
- Department of Mathematics And Statistics
- Department of Mechanical Engineering
- Department of Physics
- Department of Software Engineering
- Department of Telecommunication Engineering

== Academics ==
=== Undergraduate programs ===
The system of education is the semester wise system. The academic year is divided into two semesters. University offers four-year (Eight Semesters) Bachelor's degree in Engineering, Information Technology, Computer Science, English and Mathematics.

Bachelor's degree program is offered by the following departments of university:

- Department of Artificial Intelligence
- Department of Automation and Control Engineering
- Department of Agro-Food Processing Engineering Technology
- Department of Chemical Engineering
- Department of Civil Engineering
- Department of Computer Science
- Department of Computer Systems Engineering
- Department of Electrical Engineering
- Department of Electronic Engineering
- Department of Energy & Environment Engineering
- Department of English (Language and Literature)
- Department of Information Technology
- Department of Mathematics And Statistics
- Department of Mechanical Engineering
- Department of Physics
- Department of Software Engineering
- Department of Telecommunication Engineering

=== Postgraduate program ===
The new department situated at the front of Administration Block is Post Graduate Department, where various departments of university offer MS, M.Phil and Ph.D degree programs in following areas of research:

Master of Engineering (ME)

- Construction Engineering
- Civil Engineering
- Structural Engineering
- Power Engineering
- Computer System Engineering
- Computer Communication and Networks
- Manufacturing Engineering
- Industrial Engineering & Management
- Energy Systems Engineering
- Environmental Engineering
- Communication Engineering
- Industrial Automation and control

Master of Science (MS)

- Information Technology
- Software Engineering
- Mathematics
- Computer Science

== Campus ==
- Quaid-E-Awam University College of Engineering, Science & Technology, Larkano

== Affiliated Colleges ==
- Government Habib College of Technology, Nawabshah
- Govt College of Technology, Khairpur
- ^{(upgraded to full fleged University)}
- Government College of Technology, Larkana

== Facilities ==
=== Q.U.E.S.T Software House, A-Sector ===
The quest software house is under construction.

=== Labs ===
All departments have their own laboratories with equipment and facilities for each subject. Especially Departments of Computer Systems, Information Technology, Computer Science have latest infrastructure and technical staff.

=== Student's Societies ===
The university support different international and national student societies. These Societies organize seminars about advancements in the technologies, different competitions and debates. The university also provides financial support to these societies to organize such events.

=== Sports ===
The University offers a wide range of sports and leisure facilities. Student's common rooms are annexed to every hostel in which facilities are provided for indoor games such as Table Tennis, Badminton, Carom, etc. Facilities exist for outdoor games such as Volleyball, Cricket, Tennis, Hockey, Basketball, Football, Athletics and Bodybuilding.

=== Scholarships ===
The university provides some of the following scholarship opportunities to its needy students.

- HEC poor student scholarship

== See also ==
- List of Universities in Pakistan
- Mehran University of Engineering and Technology
- NED University of Engineering & Technology
- Sindh Agriculture University
- University of Sindh
- Higher Education Commission
