= History of Larkana =

Larkana (formerly Larkano) is the fourth largest city in Sindh Province, Pakistan. It is located in Larkana District and is a thickly populated city which is growing rapidly. In August 2000, Larkana celebrated its hundredth year of existence.

== History ==
Abbasiya is the old name of Larkana. Larkana was renowned for its production of cloth in those days. Its product of cloth was shifted from Mohen-Jo-Daro to the rest of the countries via water-ways; in the meantime, the same cloth was used for mummification in Egypt. Thus, credit for the unparalleled technological advancement of Mohen-Jo-Daro goes to its trade of cloth. Aryans came to Sindh in 2234 B.C. and settled in different parts of Sindh, and while crossing Larkana, reached Bhanbhoor. Sikandar (i-e Alexander) attacked Sindh in 330 B.C. His forces had crossed little known village as Mahota. It was named by his forces as Maota in Greek. After the Greeks, Sindh was ruled by Gupta dynasty from 320 CE to 525 CE. Thus, Chandias were rewarded heavily for their contribution. It was in this period that Larkana was named as Chandka. However, after demise of Jam Nizamuddin, Shah Beg Argon started ruling over Sindh.

In the late 16th century, Kalhora started their rule. In their rule, Shah Baharo was a ruler of Larkano in Kalhora period Sindhi language rose to its peak, especially in the period of Mian Sarfaraz Ahmed Khan Kalhoro Sahb. After end of Kalhora rule, period of Talpur came and Nawab Wali Mohammad Khan was made Governor of Larkano. In 1843, the English occupied Sindh and divided Sindh in three parts namely Karachi, Hyderabad and Shikarpur. Larkana was the part of Shikarpur and Dadu was part of Larkana. In 1930 Dadu was made a separate district and Larkana got its present shape during Historic movement for Pakistan. Larkanians took active role in movement of Khilafat and Higrat so on the whole Larkana is always been the centre of political activity in Sindh.

== Historic background ==
Larkana is first mentioned in the "Tuhfatulakram", a book written in Kalhora period. Even in this book, nothing is told about the origin of the city. Larkana is discussed in later histories like "Tareekh Taza Navai Muarka", "Lab-Tareekh-e-Sindh", and in travelogues of foreign travellers. In histories of pre-Kalhora period, such as "Chach Nama", "Aeen-e-Akbari", "Tareekh-e-Masoomi", and "Tareekh-e-Mazhar Shah Jahani", nothing is found about this city. This reveals that Larkana exerted its political, cultural, and economic importance during the period of Kalhoras. This city possibly did not exist before this period or, if existed, was a small village of no importance. (Translated from "Larkana Tareekh je Aaeene men" by Dr. Abdul Majeed Sindhi (Memon))

British Times (1843 to 1947) British after conquering Sindh started irrigation canals and Larkana got a lot of importance. British made Larkana the headquarters of Larkana District and Larkana Taluka. For some time Larkana and rest of Sindh was part of the Bombay Presidency of British India. The city lay on the route of the North-Western Railway, and the population according to the 1901 census of India was 14,543.

The Imperial Gazetteer of India reads The country surrounding Lārkāna is fertile and populous, and perhaps the finest tract in the whole of the province: The spacious walks, well laid-out gardens, and luxuriant foliage, have gained for Lārkāna the title of the 'Eden of Sind.' It is one of the most important grain marts of Sind, and is famous for a variety of rice called sugdāsi. There is a large local traffic in metals, cloth, and leather. The principal manufactures are cloth of mixed silk and cotton, coarse cotton cloth, metal vessels, and leathern goods. The town contains a dispensary, an Anglo-vernacular school attended by 80 pupils, and a vernacular school with three branches, attended altogether by 379 pupils.

== Role of the city ==
Larkana is the most important settlement in the Western Upper Sindh. The hometown of many politicians, it exercises a country-wide influence. Recently the city has been elevated to the status of division headquarters. On this basis it is expected that its importance will further increase.

Larkana is characterised as a major center rendering a variety of services to a rich agriculture hinterland. Information collected by PEPAC in 1985 indicated a ratio of about 33 inhabitants per shop in Larkana, a figure which if compared to the national standards infers that a considerable percentage of the customers come from outside the city. The catchment population of Larkana for commercial services is estimated today at some 0.75 million people. In spite of its importance as an administrative and service center, Larkana never managed to become up to now a center of 'export oriented ' industrial activities. According to the 1981 census population figures, Larkana (with 123,000 inhabitants at that time), ranked 5th in the Sindh Province and 23rd in Pakistan.

Larkana is performing high order functions in the health and education sectors. The beneficiaries of these services originate not only from within the district but from the entire Sindh province. Likewise in health, specialised services are available with the Chandka Medical College and Sheikh Zaid Hospitals where 50% of the patients in 1985 were from places outside the Larkana environs.

=== Chandka Medical College (CMC) now Shaheed Mohtarma Benazir Bhutto Medical University ===
Chandka Medical College (CMC), was built by former Prime Minister Zulfiqar Ali Bhutto for the people of Larkana, it was inaugurated on 20 April 1973 as 4th medical college of the Sindh. Second Batch of 250 students was admitted in 1974. due to shortage of accommodation as a result of increasing number of admissions, one, four story, girls hostel & two boys hostels were constructed,. Now it has six boys hostels and two girls which can accommodates about 1100 students.

The Chandka Medical College, is recognized by Pakistan Medical & Dental Council (PMDC). The College of Physicians & Surgeons Pakistan (CPSP) has also established its regional center at CMC Larkana. CPSP, has started conducting FCPS-I, FCPS-II and MCPS Examination CMC, Larkana center since 1999. the results (Passing Percentage) of candidates appearing theory examinations is comparable with other centers of the country. The Chandka Medical College is upgraded to a medical university, Shaheed Mohtrama Benazir Bhutto Medical University (SMBBMU) on 12 April 2008.

== Location ==
Larkana city is the headquarters of Larkana District. Centrally located with respect to the district, Larkana lies on 27°33'39.60" north latitude and 68°12'27.00" east longitude (coordinates of Lahori Regulator on Rice Canal in Larkana). Sukkur is at a distance of about 85 km in east. Other important towns in vicinity of Larkana are Miro Khan and Naudero. The district shares its western boundaries with Baluchistan Province.

== Population ==
In 1891, population of Larkana was merely 12019 (6643 males and 5376 females). In 1941, the population was 28,084 (10760 Hindu males, 4411 Muslim males, 9507 Hindu females, and 3406 Muslim females). The area of Municipal Committee was 1,250 acres (5.1 km^{2}) in 1941.

Year / Population

- 1891 / 12019
- 1901 / 14543
- 1911 / 16097
- 1931 / 24698
- 1941 / 28084
- 1951 / 32745
- 1961 / 48231
- 1971 / 71893
- 1981 / 123410
- 1990 / 180000
- 2000 / 254000
- 2010 / 345000

Male-Female Population Ratio

- 1972
- 1985
- 1990
- 2000
- 2010

% of Males

- 53.8
- 53.5
- 52.5
- 51.5
- 50.0

% of Females

- 46.2
- 46.5
- 47.5
- 48.5
- 50.0

Male/Female Ratio

- 1.16
- 1.15
- 1.11
- 1.06
- 1.00

== Geography ==
The district is bounded on the north by Balochistan Province, on the east by Shikarpur and Khairpur districts and part of Nausheroferoz district, to the south, is bounded by the Dadu District and to the west by the Kohistan area of the Khirthar range, which separates it side, adjoining the Shikarpur, Khairpur and Nausheroferoz district. Geographically, the district is divided into three parts viz, the Kohistan Tract, Central Canal Irrigation Tract and the Eastern Tract. The Western portion of the district comprising western parts of Shahdadkot, Kamber and the Warah Talukas consists of the Kohistan area. A range of limestone hills and mountains referred to by the old writers as the “Hallar”, but generally known as the Khirthar range, extends along the whole western boundary of the district, with a breadth of 19 to 21 kilometers in a straight line.

The Khirthar range consists of an ascending series of ridges, running generally north to south with broad, flat valleys in between. These ridges are locally distinguished by different names, for example, the first line of hills is known as “Kakrio” (broken), the next as “Karo”(Black), and the third as “Pinaro” (Saffron coloured). The highest ridge of the range at its northern extremity is about 1,500 meters above the sea-level. The most elevated peak known as “Kute-ji-Kabar” (dog's tomb) is 2064 meters above the sea-level.

The entire area of this district within the protective bounds (one on the western side to prevent hill torrents in rainy season and the other on the eastern side of the district to protect the canal irrigated area from rivers (floods) is irrigated by a network of canals viz. the Rice Canal, Dadu Canal, Warah Canal, Khirthar Canal and Saifullah Magsi Canal. The area irrigated by these canals is 870,127 acres (3,521.28 km^{2}).

== Religious sites ==
=== Selected mosques ===
- Eid Gah Jamia Masjid
- Lahori Jamia Masjid
- Qasmia Masjid
- Allah Wari Masjid (Baqrani Road)

=== Churches ===
- St Joseph Catholic Church
- Baptist Church

== See also ==
- Larkana Bulls
- Abida Parveen
- Sohai Ali Abro
