= Muhammad Basharat Raja =

Pakistani politician (born 1951)

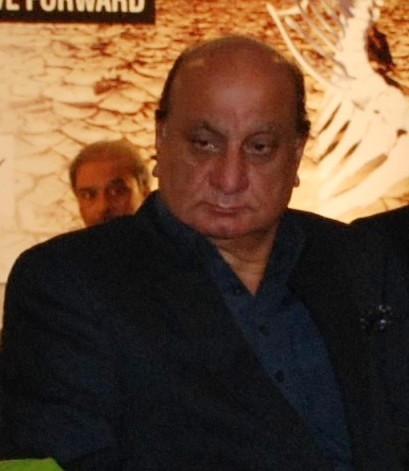
- Muhammad Basharat Raja in 2014

Provincial Minister of Punjab for Law and Parliamentary Affairs
- In office 27 August 2018 – 1 April 2022
- Chief Minister: Usman Buzdar

Ministry of Industries and Production (Pakistan)
- In office 3 May 2011 – 16 March 2013
- President: Asif Ali Zardari
- Prime Minister: Yusuf Raza Gillani; Raja Pervaiz Ashraf

Provincial Minister of Punjab for Law and Parliamentary Affairs
- In office 2003–2007
- Chief Minister: Parvez Elahi

Provincial Minister of Punjab for Law and Parliamentary Affairs
- In office 1997–1999
- Chief Minister: Shehbaz Sharif

Member of the Provincial Assembly of the Punjab
- In office 15 August 2018 – 14 January 2023
- Constituency: PP-14 Rawalpindi-IX
- In office 2003–2007
- Constituency: PP-110 (Gujrat-III)
- In office 1996–1999
- Constituency: PP-4 (Rawalpindi-IV)
- In office 1993–1996
- Constituency: PP-4 (Rawalpindi- IV)
- In office 1990–1993
- Constituency: PP-4 (Rawalpindi- IV)

Member District Council Rawalpindi
- In office 1987–1990
- Constituency: Rawalpindi

Chairman District Council Rawalpindi
- In office 1979–1987
- Constituency: Rawalpindi

Personal details
- Born: 11 August 1951 (age 75) Rawalpindi, Punjab, Pakistan
- Party: PTI (2018-present)
- Other political affiliations: PML(Q) (2002-2018); PMLN (1993-1999); IJI (1998-1990); PPP (1970-1988)

Muhammad Basharat Raja (Punjabi: محمد بشارت راجہ) is a Pakistani politician who was the Provincial Minister of Punjab for Law and Parliamentary Affairs and Provincial Minister of Punjab for Baitul Maal and Social Welfare. He had been a member of the Provincial Assembly of the Punjab from August 2018 till January 2023. He is the son of former Member of the National Assembly of Pakistan Raja Laal of Rawalpindi.

He was first elected as Chairman District Council Rawalpindi in 1979. Previously, he was a member of the Provincial Assembly of the Punjab from 1990 to 1999 and again from 2003 to 2007. He served as Provincial Minister of Punjab for Law and Parliamentary Affairs, and Minister for Information, Culture and Youth Affairs between 1997 and 1999 and served as Provincial Minister of Punjab for Local Government and Community Development, and minister for Law, Parliamentary Affairs and Public Prosecution between 2003 and 2007. On 21 November 2020, he was appointed Provincial Minister of Punjab for Cooperatives. He was also the Provincial Minister of Public Prosecution and Cooperatives in the cabinet of Chief Minister Chaudhry Pervaiz Elahi from 7 August 2022 to 22 December 2022.

== Early and personal life ==
He was born on 11 August 1951 in Rawalpindi, Pakistan. He belongs to the powerful Janjua Rajput tribe of the Pothohar region. His tribe Dhamial Rajgan shares blood relations with other powerful Rajgans of Chakra, Ranial, Bijnial, Chak Jalal-uddin and other prominent dominating families of Rawalpindi. His tribe spreads over many villages of Rawalpindi, Chakwal, Gujarkhan areas. He is the son of former MPA Raja Laal Khan. His uncle won the district elections before independence 1947. He received the degree of Bachelor of Laws in 1976 from University of the Punjab. He resides at Dhamial House Rawalpindi. A Public secretariat is also present beside his personal residence. He is the first cousin of former Tehsil Nazim Rawalpindi Hamid Nawaz Raja. His brother Raja Nasir is also a senior politician and served as special advisor to Chief Minister of Punjab.

=== Marriage controversy ===
In 2017, Seemal Raja, former Member of Punjab Assembly sent a defamation notice of Rs 2 billion to Raja and claimed that Raja had married her in August 2014 but refused to publicly accept the marriage which damaged her reputation. She also accused Raja and his family of seizing her assets, including jewelry, cash and a vehicle. In July 2018, she claimed that Raja tortured her and expelled her from his house.

He was also married to a woman political activist (affiliated with PML-Q) from Balochistan named Pari Gull Agha. Seemal Raja (his accused wife) claimed that Basharat Raja had also divorced Pari Gull Agha. Seemal's claim was denied by Basharat Raja.

== Political career ==
He began his political career with the Pakistan Peoples Party (PPP) in 1970s and then joined Pakistan Muslim League (N) (PML-N).

He was elected to the Provincial Assembly of the Punjab as a candidate of Islami Jamhoori Ittehad (IJI) from Constituency PP-4 (Rawalpindi-IV) in the 1990 Pakistani general election. He received 45,389 votes and defeated Zakir Hussain Shah.

He was re-elected to the Provincial Assembly of the Punjab as a candidate of PML-N from Constituency PP-4 (Rawalpindi-IV) in the 1993 Pakistani general election. He received 47,811 votes and defeated Zakir Hussain Shah.

He was re-elected to the Provincial Assembly of the Punjab as a candidate of PML-N from Constituency PP-4 (Rawalpindi-IV) in the 1997 Pakistani general election. He received 46,253 votes and defeated Zamarud Khan. During his tenure as member of the Punjab Assembly, he served in the provincial Punjab cabinet of Chief Minister Shehbaz Sharif as Provincial Minister of Punjab for Law and Parliamentary Affairs with the additional ministerial portfolio of Information, Culture and Youth Affairs.

He quit PML-N following the 1999 Pakistani coup d'état and joined Pakistan Muslim League (Q) (PML-Q). Large number of his tribesmen parted ways with him after this decision and decided to remain loyal to Mian Nawaz Sharif, joined Ch Nisar Ali Khan.

He ran for the seat of the Provincial Assembly of the Punjab as a candidate of PML-Q from Constituency PP-6 (Rawalpindi-VI) in the 2002 Pakistani general election but was unsuccessful. He received 14,701 votes and lost the seat to Raja Arshad Mehmood, a candidate of PML-N.

On 3 January 2003, he was inducted into the provincial Punjab cabinet of Chief Minister Chaudhry Pervaiz Elahi and appointed adviser to the chief minister of Punjab.

He was re-elected to the Provincial Assembly of the Punjab as a candidate of PML-Q from Constituency PP-110 (Gujrat-III) in by-polls held on 15 January 2003. He received 82,057 votes and defeated Chaudhry Tariq Javed, a candidate of PPP. He was accused of misusing the state machinery to win the election. During his tenure as member of the Punjab Assembly, he served as Provincial Minister of Punjab for Local Government and Community Development with the additional ministerial portfolio of Law, Parliamentary Affairs and Public Prosecution.

He ran for the seat of the National Assembly of Pakistan as a candidate of PML-Q from Constituency NA-54 (Rawalpindi–V) in the 2008 Pakistani general election but was unsuccessful. He received 10,400 votes and lost the seat to Malik Ibrar Ahmed. In the same election, he also ran for the seat of the Provincial Assembly of the Punjab as a candidate of PML-Q from Constituency PP-6 (Rawalpindi-VI) but was unsuccessful. He received 17,771 votes and lost the seat to Chaudhary Sarfraz Afzal.

He ran for the seat of the National Assembly as a candidate of PML-Q from Constituency NA-52 (Rawalpindi-III) in the 2013 Pakistani general election but was unsuccessful. He received 43,866 votes and lost the seat to Nisar Ali Khan.

In June 2018, because of seat adjustment with PTI he contested the election on Pakistan Tehreek-e-Insaf (PTI) ticket.

He was re-elected to the Provincial Assembly of the Punjab as a candidate of the PTI from PP-14 Rawalpindi-IX in the 2018 Punjab provincial election.

On 27 August 2018, he was inducted into the provincial Punjab cabinet of Chief Minister Sardar Usman Buzdar and was appointed Provincial Minister of Punjab for law and parliamentary affairs.

He ran for a seat in the Provincial Assembly of Punjab from PP-12 Rawalpindi-VII as a candidate of the PTI in the 2024 Punjab provincial election but was defeated in that election.
