= University of Larkano =

Public university in Karachi, Pakistan

The University of Larkano
- Motto: رَبِّ زدْنيِ عِلْماً (Arabic) اي الله منھنجي علم ۾ اضافو فرماء (Sindhi)
- Motto in English: O my Lord! Advance me in Knowledge
- Type: Public
- Established: 20 August 2023; 3 years ago
- Affiliations: Higher Education Commission (Pakistan); Pakistan Engineering Council; Pakistan Bar Council
- Chancellor: Governor of Sindh
- Vice-Chancellor: Professor Dr. Nek Muhammad Shaikh
- Students: 41,000 (full time only)
- Location: Larkano, Sindh, Pakistan
- Campus: 1,279 acres (5.18 km^{2})
- Colours: White, Blue, Maroon
- Nickname: The University of Larkano
- Website: uolrk.edu.pk

The University of Larkano (Urdu: جامعہ لاڑکانہ; Sindhi لاڙڪاڻو يونيورسٽي informally Larkana University or UoLrk) is a public research university located in Larkana, Sindh, Pakistan, established on 20 August 2023. The University of Larkano Bill, 2023 having been passed by the Provincial Assembly of Sindh on 24 July 2023 and assented to by the Governor of Sindh on 20 August 2023 is hereby published as an Act of the Legislature of Sindh.

== History ==
The University of Larkano was created by the merger of several educational institutions, which now form its faculties:

- The Larkana campus of the University of Sindh is now the Faculty of Social Sciences and Humanities.
- The Larkana campus of the Quaid-e-Awam University of Engineering, Science & Technology is now the Faculty of Engineering.
- The Shaheed Zulfiqar Ali Bhutto Agricultural College Dokri has been restructured as the Faculty of Agriculture.

On 05-Nov-2026, The University of Larkano was formally inaugurated by Pakistan Peoples Party (PPP) Chairman Bilawal Bhutto Zardari, who unveiled the university's plaque alongside Sindh Chief Minister Syed Murad Ali Shah.

== Academic programs ==
In its inaugural batch of 2024, the University of Larkano is offering various undergraduate programs across its three main faculties:

Faculty of Social Sciences and Humanities

- Bachelor's degrees in Business Administration, English (Language & Literature), and Computer Science

Faculty of Engineering

- Bachelor's degrees in Civil Engineering, Mechanical Engineering, Electrical Engineering, and Electronics Engineering

Faculty of Agriculture

- Bachelor's degree in agriculture.

In the following programs named below

1. Agronomy 2. Soil Science 3. Plant breeding and genetics 4. Horticulture 5. Plant protection 6. Plant pathology 7. Entomology
