= Zamarud Khan =

Pakistani politician (born 1968)

Zamarud Khan HI

Member of the National Assembly of Pakistan
- In office 2002–2007
- Preceded by: Nisar Ali Khan
- Succeeded by: Malik Ibrar Ahmed
- Constituency: NA-54 Rawalpindi-V

MD of Pakistan Bait-ul-Mal
- In office 2008–2013

Personal details
- Born: 1 January 1968 (age 58) Rawalpindi
- Party: Pakistan People's Party (2002–present)
- Awards: Hilal-e-Imtiaz (2012)

Zamarud Khan is a Pakistani politician who served as the Member of the National Assembly of Pakistan from 2002 to 2007. He also served as MD of Pakistan Bait-ul-Mal from 2008 to 2013. He is known for his involvement in a hostage crisis in Pakistan on 15 August 2013, where he attempted to subdue the hostage-taker. Police used the unplanned distraction to fire at the gunman, which injured him and led to his arrest. He has also established an organization for orphaned children in Pakistan, which operates multiple centres across the country.
