= Chaudhary Sarfraz Afzal =

Pakistani politician (born 1975)

Member of the Provincial Assembly of the Punjab
- In office 2008 – 31 May 2018
- Constituency: PP-6 (Rawalpindi-VI)

Personal details
- Born: 11 July 1975 (age 51) Rawalpindi, Punjab, Pakistan
- Party: Independent (since 2026)
- Other political affiliations: AP (2024-2026); PMLN (2008-2024)

Chaudhary Sarfraz Afzal is a Pakistani politician who was a Member of the Provincial Assembly of the Punjab, from 2008 to May 2018.

== Early life and education ==
Chaudhary Sarfraz Afzal was born on 11 July 1975 in Rawalpindi. He then graduated in 2002 from Bahauddin Zakariya University and has a degree in Bachelor of Arts.

== Political career ==
Afzal was elected to the Provincial Assembly of the Punjab as a candidate of Pakistan Muslim League (N) (PML-N) from Constituency PP-6 (Rawalpindi-VI) in the 2008 Pakistani general election. He received 40,626 votes and defeated Muhammad Basharat Raja of Pakistan Muslim League (Q) (PML-Q). In the same election, he ran for the seat of the National Assembly of Pakistan as an independent candidate from Constituency NA-52 (Rawalpindi-III) but was unsuccessful against Nisar Ali Khan.

From 2008 to 2013, he served as a political adviser to the Chief Minister of Punjab, Shehbaz Sharif.

Afzal was re-elected to the Provincial Assembly of the Punjab as a candidate of PML-N from Constituency PP-6 (Rawalpindi-VI) in by-polls held in August 2013. He received 30,065 votes and defeated Wasiq Qayyum Abbasi, a candidate of Pakistan Tehreek-e-Insaf (PTI).

In December 2013, he was appointed as Parliamentary Secretary for youth affairs, archaeology and tourism. Further, he led the Youth Wing of PML-N as President of its Punjab chapter alongside Muhammad Safdar Awan, inducting over 100,000 youth into party ranks.

On 18 November 2020, Azfal was arrested by Anti-Corruption Establishment Punjab, accused of trading property illegally. He was transferred to hospital as he was suffering from heart disease at the time of his arrest. On 22 November, he was granted bail.

Following the 2024 Pakistani general election, Afzal formally resigned from PML-N, citing ideological differences with its leadership. In September 2024, he joined Awaam Pakistan (AP) on the invitation of former Prime Minister Shahid Khaqan Abbasi. In March 2026, he was elected to the AP's National General Council.

In September 2026, Afzal announced he was resigning his membership of AP, citing "unacceptable and humilating behaviour" from Abbasi. Afzal said he wished the party "the very best and good luck for the future".
