= 2013 Islamabad hostage crisis =

- Location: Jinnah Avenue, Islamabad, Pakistan
- Date: August 15, 2013
- Attack type: Hostage crisis
- Deaths: 0
- Injuries: 1 (the perpetrator)
- Perpetrator: Malik Muhammed Sikander

On 15 August 2013, a hostage crisis occurred in Islamabad, Pakistan, in the Blue Area of the city. Malik Muhammed Sikander took one woman and two children hostage, purported to be his wife and children. The event ended after six hours due to the intervention of Zamarud Khan and the shooting of Sikander.

== Background ==
Islamabad had been on high alert for the ten days preceding the event, as intelligence agencies had suggested a high likelihood of terrorist activity in the city. The week prior to the crisis, the Quetta mosque attack had taken place. However the police quickly eliminated this as an organized terrorist operation.

== Events ==
On 15 August 2013, Malik Muhammad Sikandar stole a car and eluded several police officers. He eventually drove into the middle of Jinnah Avenue in the Blue Area. Police on the scene were initially unable to arrest the man. According to Inspector General of Police Sikandar Hayat, the gunman made seven demands during early negotiations, including the imposition of Shariah in the country and safe passage for his family. Some demands were illegal and others beyond the ability of police to provide. The police conducted several rounds of negotiations without result. The incident was televised live over a six-hour period.

Several politicians attempted to negotiate with the hostage-taker, without success. Zamarud Khan was also watching the situation and travelled to the scene where he obtained permission to approach the gunman. Khan approached the family and exchanged a few words with the gunman. While shaking hands with the children, Khan made a sudden attempt to capture the man, but lost his footing. The gunman fired several shots, but Khan escaped injury. Khan rushed towards the children and moved them away from danger. Available police then fired at the gunman's legs, injuring him, and he fell to the ground. He was arrested and taken to hospital for treatment.

== Aftermath ==
After Sikander's arrest, the Kohsar Police Station registered a case against him and his wife under Section 6 of the Anti-Terrorism Act 1997. On 11 May 2017, an Anti-Terrorism Court in Islamabad sentenced Muhammad Sikander to 16 years in prison and a Rs.110,000 fine. It added that failure to pay the fine would result in an increase in the prison sentence by six months. His wife was acquitted and released.

A petition seeking suspension of Sikander's sentence was brought to Islamabad High Court. The Court, consisting of Chief Justice Athar Minallah and Justice Mian Gul Hassan Aurangzeb, reserved its decision on 13 April 2019. The decision was announced on 12 June 2019, and the petition was dismissed.

Terming the whole episode a security lapse, the government changed 9 of the 16 superintendents of police (SPs) of Islamabad. An unofficial report released by the inquiry committee pointed out major failures in the communication mechanisms of the security forces. The findings stated that the security forces and the police had failed to come up with a well-planned strategy to deal with the situation, and that the incident had been unnecessarily prolonged.
