= Aqeel Malik =

Pakistani politician

- عقیل ملک

Member of the National Assembly of Pakistan
- Incumbent
- Assumed office 29 February 2024
- Constituency: NA-54 Rawalpindi-III

Adviser to Ministry of Law and Justice
- In office 3 July 2024 – 27 February 2025

Spokesperson Government of Pakistan on Legal Affairs
- In office 20 August 2024 – 28 February 2025

Personal details
- Born: Rawalpindi, Punjab, Pakistan
- Party: PMLN (2018-present)
- Other political affiliations: IND (2024)

Aqeel Malik is a Pakistani politician who has been a member of the National Assembly of Pakistan since February 2024.

== Early life and education ==
Malik qualified as a non-practising barrister in 2011 after completing the Bar Professional Training Course at City Law School, London, and is a member of the Honourable Society of Gray's Inn. He later earned an LL.M. in International & Comparative Law from the George Washington University, Washington, D.C., in 2012. Official government profiles also style him as a Barrister with a legal background in constitutional and criminal law.

== Early legal career ==
After returning to Pakistan, Malik practised law from 2011 onward, focusing on constitutional law, criminal law, election law, white-collar crime, contract negotiation and alternative dispute resolution. He is listed as a partner (Advocate Supreme Court) at the firm ANZ Partners. His professional memberships include lifetime membership of the Lahore High Court Bar Association (Rawalpindi Bench), lifetime membership of the Taxila Bar Association, and membership of Gray's Inn in London.

== Political career ==
Aqeel Malik won the 2024 Pakistani general election as an independent candidate from NA-54 Rawalpindi-III by securing 85,912 votes. He later sided with Pakistan Muslim League (N).

On 3 April 2024, the Ministry of Information & Broadcasting appointed him Government Spokesperson on Legal Affairs on an honorary, non-remunerative basis.

On 3 July 2024, the Ministry of Law and Justice issued a notification appointing him Adviser to the Ministry on an honorary basis under rule 5(8) of the Rules of Business, 1973.

He took oath as Minister of State for Law and Justice on 27 February 2025. The appointment was notified by the Cabinet Division and subsequently reflected in official lists of ministers of state and press releases.

As Minister of State, he has represented Pakistan at international fora and official events, including the 151st Inter-Parliamentary Union (IPU) Assembly and diplomatic receptions, as recorded by the Press Information Department (PID).
