= Jan Mohammad Abbasi =

Vice President of Jamaat-e-Islami Pakistan

- جان محمدعباسي

Vice President of Jamaat-e-Islami Pakistan
- In office ?–?

Personal details
- Party: Jamaat-e-Islami Pakistan
- Occupation: Politician
- Known for: Jamaat-e-Islami Pakistan's vice president for 27 years; former Muttahida Majlis-e-Amal Sindh chief; contested the 1977 elections against Zulfiqar Ali Bhutto from Larkana constituency

Jan Mohammad Abbasi (Urdu: جان محمدعباسي) was the Vice President of Jamaat-e-Islami Pakistan.

== Contribution ==
Abbasi had been the Jamaat-e-Islami Pakistan's vice president for 27 years. He had earlier served the Muttahida Majlis-e-Amal as its Sindh chief. He contested the 1977 elections against the founder of the Pakistan People's Party Zulfiqar Ali Bhutto from the Larkana constituency. Unfortunately, he was kidnapped, therefore Zulfiqar Ali Bhutto ultimately won the elections as there was no opposition.
