= UNESCO-UNEVOC =

UN Organisation

International Centre for Technical and Vocational Education and Training of the United Nations Educational, Scientific and Cultural Organization
- Abbreviation: UNESCO-UNEVOC
- Formation: 2002
- Location: Bonn, Germany
- Head of Office: Friedrich Huebler
- Website: unevoc.unesco.org

The UNESCO-UNEVOC International Centre for Technical and Vocational Education and Training is the International Centre for connecting UNESCO Member States worldwide to develop and strengthen technical and vocational education and training (TVET). The International Centre is located at the United Nations Campus in Bonn, Germany and is financed by both UNESCO and the German government. UNESCO-UNEVOC works in the context of UNESCO’s mandate "to lead and coordinate Education 2030 through guidance and technical support". It undertakes its activities through a global network of TVET institutions comprising departments of ministries, national TVET bodies, Universities, and nationally leading training centers.

== History ==
In 1989, the United Nations recognized that the “development of technical and vocational education should contribute to the safeguarding of peace and friendly understanding among nations” and was, as such, part of a UN Mandate. In this context, an “International Project on Technical and Vocational Education” was initiated and the “UNEVOC Network” was officially launched in 1992.

The UNESCO-UNEVOC International Centre was created in 1999 based on the decision of the 30th UNESCO General Conference. A year later, UNESCO and the German government agreed on hosting the International Centre within the Langer Eugen building, the former building for the German members of parliament which is now part of the UN Campus. The new facilities were inaugurated in April 2002. UNEVOC is hosted and partly financed by the German government.

=== Directors / Heads of Office ===
Name	Country	Term
Rupert Maclean	Australia	2002-2009
Efison Munjanganja (Acting Director)	Zimbabwe	2009-2010
Shyamal Majumdar	India	2011-2019
Soo-Hyang Choi	Republic of Korea	2020-2021
Friedrich Hübler	Austrian	Since 2022

== Mission and activities ==
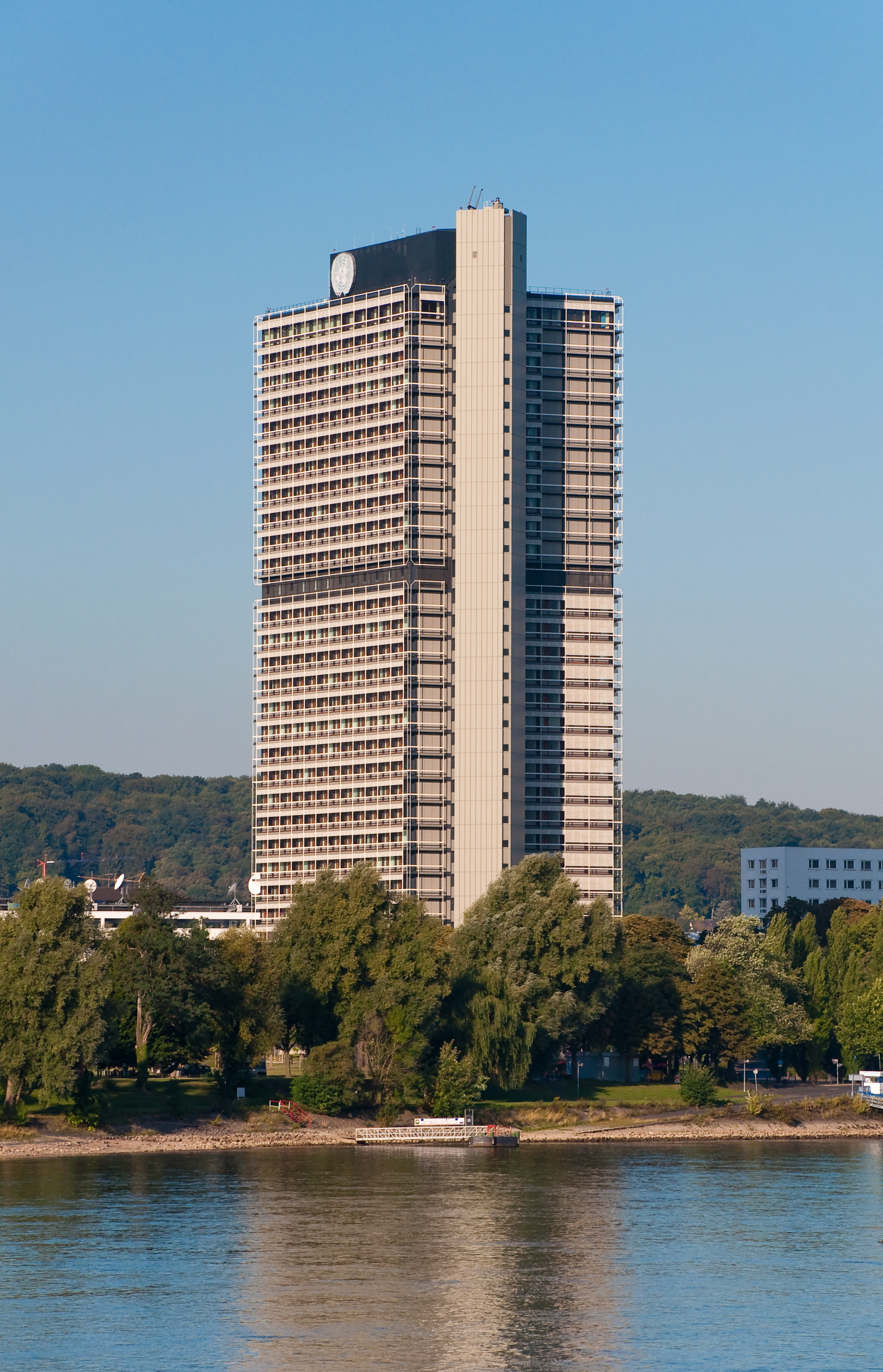
UN Campus in Bonn

The Centre works in the context of UNESCO’s mandate related to education, to lead the Global Education 2030 Agenda through Sustainable Development Goal 4. The Centre's official mission is to assist Member States to strengthen and upgrade their TVET systems in order to achieve the "access for all, high quality, relevant and effective programmes and learning opportunities throughout life”. The third UN international congress on TVET, which was organized in 2012, reinforced the mission and action of UNEVOC by recognizing within its recommendation the importance of "expanding and enhancing the capacities of the UNEVOC network to play a key role in developing the capacities of decision-makers and practitioners, and facilitate the involvement of all stakeholders". Nowadays, the UNESCO-UNEVOC International Centre links up a network of over 220 Centres in more than 140 Member States. "UNEVOC Centres" aim to improve TVET in the Member State in which they are located. The International Centre defines itself as a hub facilitating the international collaboration between Centres, experts and stakeholders: In this regard, UNESCO-UNEVOC organizes conferences, workshops, expert meetings in the partner countries or at its premises in Bonn. Those events gather experts and representatives from UNEVOC Centres, UNESCO institutions and other national and international partners. UNESCO-UNEVOC also provides online resources. Publications on TVET are completed by some field-recognized products like "TVETipedia" (an open TVET glossary), a public TVET country profiles database, and the "TVET Forum", an online discussion board for TVET experts. Besides its networking and knowledge management activity, the International Centre is known for its contribution to the field of sustainable TVET (also called "Greening TVET").

== See also ==
- UNESCO
- Vocational Education
