= Benazir Bhutto Shaheed University of Technology and Skill Development =

Pakistani university

The Benazir Bhutto Shaheed University of Technology and Skill Development
- بینظیر بھٹو شہید یونیورسٹی آف ٹیکنالوجی اینڈ ڈیویلپمنٹ
- Former names: Government College of Technology Khairpur Mirs
- Type: Public
- Established: 2016
- Affiliations: Higher Education Commission (Pakistan); National Technology Council
- Chancellor: Governor of Sindh
- Vice-Chancellor: Rasool Bux Mahar
- Director: Asim Ali Abro
- Students: ~1200
- Undergraduates: ~2800
- Postgraduates: ~400
- Doctoral students: ~30
- Location: Prof. Hami Corporative Society, Hami Road, Khairpur, Sindh, Pakistan; 27.5108°N 68.7416°E
- Campus: Urban
- Colours: Brown and white
- Nickname: BBSUTSD
- Mascot: BBSUTSDIAN
- Website: bbsutsd.edu.pk

The Benazir Bhutto Shaheed University of Technology and Skill Development (BBSUTSD), also known as Government College of Technology (GCT) Khairpur, is a public university located in Khairpur Mirs, Sindh, Pakistan. It was established in 2016.
