= Nazar Hussain Kiyani =

Pakistani politician

Nazar Hussain Kiyani (7 May 1932 – 31 March 2008) was a Pakistan Peoples Party politician.

== Professional life ==
Joined Pakistan international Airline PIA and was elected as President, Pakistan Peoples Unity (a labor union) for consecutive terms.

- He was famous amongst the labour and labour unions countrywide and was elected as the President All Pakistan Labour Union in the 1960s.
- He was then chosen by Zulfiqar Ali Bhutto and was asked to leave his job and join Pakistan Peoples Party (PPP). He joined PPP in 1967 and was one of the founding members of the party.
- He was elected as Member, National Assembly of Pakistan twice (1973 and 1977), First Chief whip in National Assembly of PPP with Zulfiqar Ali Bhutto.
- Elected Twice, Member, Provincial Assembly of the Punjab (MPA) and Deputy Opposition Leader, Punjab Assembly
- President of Pakistan Peoples Party (Chakwal Division and Rawalpindi Division)
- Incharge Central Secretariat, Pakistan Peoples Party, Islamabad
- Vice President, Punjab branch, Pakistan Peoples Party
- Under his leadership, PPP won 6 out of 7 National Assembly seats in Rawalpindi in the Pakistani general election, 1990, which are the highest number of seats won in Rawalpindi by PPP till now.
- Went to jail, got imprisoned during the Zia era and suffered political torture. His daughter and mother died while he was in prison, and he was not allowed to attend their funerals. His mother died in 1983 and he was in Gujranwala prison at the time. General Zia Ul-Haq asked him to submit a written apology following which he will be released to attend the funeral of his mother which he out-rightly denied.
- He was contacted by numerous parties including Pakistan Muslim League (N) leadership to join their party on attractive incentives and perks which he did not accept and remained loyal to Bhutto-ism till his death.
- Represented Pakistan on behalf of the PPP internationally in many forums. Travelled all around the globe (Asia, America, Europe, Middle East) and spoke for and served Pakistan's interests with dignity. From Wilton park Conference to Shanghai Cooperation and Kabul University, he was and is known as an aggressive and eloquent speaker. Performed Hajj 7 Umrah and also got the honour of Ziaarat Muqaddas in Iran & Iraq.
- Regular Writer & Author of many articles published in National newspapers (Daily jang, Nawai Waqt, Ausaf, Asas, Express, Musawaat, Dawn, The News)
