= Benazir Bhutto Shaheed Youth Development Program =

- BBSYDP بے نظیر بھٹو شہید یوتھ ڈیولپمنٹ پروگرام
- Motto in English: (Mega Initiate Addressing Poverty And Unemployment Through Skill Development)
- Established: 2008
- Affiliations: World Bank, Government of Sindh
- Location: Karachi, Sindh, Pakistan
- Website: www.bbsydpsindh.gov.pk

The Benazir Bhutto Shaheed Youth Development Program (BBSYDP) is a Government of Sindh training program for young unemployed people. In 2012, 46,000 people qualified to take part in the program.

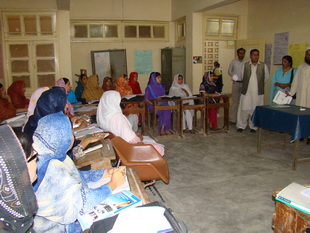
BBSYDP Training PIC 1

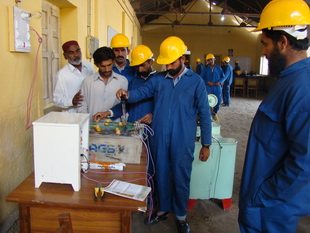
BBSYDP Training PIC 2
