= Raja Shahid Zafar =

Pakistani politician

Raja Shahid Zafar is a Pakistani politician and was elected twice as the member of the National Assembly of Pakistan from 1985 to 1988 and 1988 to 1990. He also served as a minister of state for production and industries.

He was educated at Gordon College, Rawalpindi.
