= Sindh Technical Education & Vocational Training Authority =

Sindh Technical Education & Vocational Training Authority (STEVTA) is a technical and vocational training authority founded by the Government of Sindh. It was established in 2009 to regulate the technical and vocational institutes of Sindh.

== See also ==
- National Vocational and Technical Training Commission
