= Malik Ibrar Ahmed =

Pakistani politician

- ملک ابرار احمد

Member of the National Assembly of Pakistan
- In office 2008 – 31 May 2018
- Constituency: NA-54 (Rawalpindi-V)

Member of the Provincial Assembly of the Punjab
- In office 2002–2007
- Constituency: PP-10 (Rawalpindi-X)

Personal details
- Born: 3 January 1970 (age 56)
- Party: PMLN (1994-present)

Malik Ibrar Ahmed (Urdu: ملک ابرار احمد; born 3 January 1970) is a Pakistani politician who has been a member of the National Assembly of Pakistan since February 2024 and previously served in this position from 2008 to May 2018. Previously, he has been a member of the Provincial Assembly of the Punjab from 2002 to 2007.

== Early life and education ==
He was born on 3 January 1970 in Rawalpindi.

He earned a Bachelor of Arts degree from Government College Asghar Mall Rawalpindi in 1992.

== Political career ==
He was elected to the Provincial Assembly of the Punjab as a candidate of Pakistan Muslim League (N) (PML-N) from Constituency PP-10 (Rawalpindi-X) in the 2002 Pakistani general election. He received 17,035 votes and defeated a candidate of Pakistan Peoples Party (PPP).

He was elected to the National Assembly of Pakistan as a candidate of PML-N from Constituency NA-54 (Rawalpindi-V) in the 2008 Pakistani general election. He received 58,228 votes and defeated a candidate of PPP. In the same election, he was re-elected to the Provincial Assembly of the Punjab as a candidate of PML-N from Constituency PP-10 (Rawalpindi-X). He received 35,532 votes and defeated Chaudhry Masood Akhtar, a candidate of PPP. He vacated the Punjab Assembly seat.

He was re-elected to the National Assembly as a candidate of PML-N from Constituency NA-54 (Rawalpindi-V) in the 2013 Pakistani general election. He received 76,336 votes and defeated a candidate of Pakistan Tehreek-e-Insaf.
