= National Vocational and Technical Training Commission =

National Vocational and Technical Training Commission (NAVTTC) (Urdu: قومی ماموریہَ برائے فنی تعلیم و پیشہ ورانہ تربیت) is a federal-level regulatory body for technical education and vocational training in Pakistan. It was founded by its chairman Altaf M. Saleem.

== See also ==
- Sindh Technical Education & Vocational Training Authority
