= Munir Ahmed =

Munir Ahmed is the name of:

- Munir Ahmed Badini (born 1953), Balochi language novelist
- Munir Ahmed Khan (1926–1999), Pakistani nuclear scientist
- Munir Ahmad Rashid (born 1934), Pakistani mathematician and nuclear scientist
- Munir Ahmed Mengal, head of Baloch Voice TV
- Munir Ahmed (cricketer, born 1970), international cricketer for Austria
- Munir Dar (cricketer, born 1974), international cricketer for Hong Kong
- Munir Ahmed Dar (field hockey) (1935–2011), silver medalist in 1956 and 1964 Summer Olympics
- Munir Ahmad, Afghan cricketer
