= JGT =

JGT may refer to:

- Journal of Graph Theory
- Journal of Graphics Tools
- Journal of Group Theory
