= Abdus Salam School of Mathematical Sciences =

University in Lahore, Punjab, Pakistan

Coordinates: 31.513142°N 74.314912°E

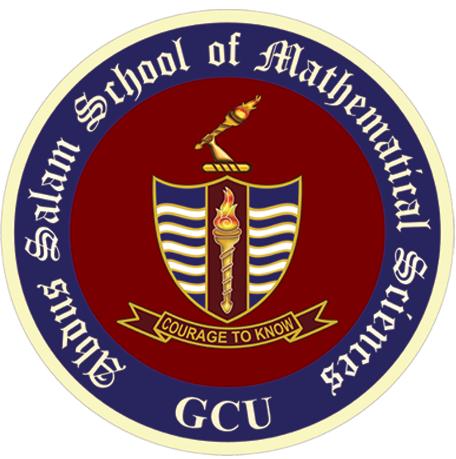
- Type: Research Institute
- Established: 2003
- Affiliations: Government College University Lahore (GCU Lahore)
- Location: 68-B, New Muslim Town, Lahore, Punjab, Pakistan
- Website: www.sms.edu.pk
- Location within Pakistan

The Abdus Salam School of Mathematical Sciences (AS-SMS), (درس گاہ عبدالسلام برائے علوم ریاضی) is an autonomous institute affiliated with the Government College University Lahore, Pakistan. The school is named after the theoretical physicist and Nobel Laureate Abdus Salam.

== History ==
Abdus Salam played an influential role in formulating policies for the development of science in Pakistan in the late 1960s and early 1970s. He helped establish a number of research institutes in Pakistan including the Pakistan Institute of Nuclear Science and Technology (PINSTECH) and the Atomic Energy Commission.

In 2002, the Government of Punjab established a center of excellence in mathematical sciences, the School of Mathematical Sciences, affiliated with Government College University Lahore. The idea behind the school is to create a world-class doctoral research institute in mathematics, but rooted in a developing country like Pakistan. The school was later named after Abdus Salam who was professor of mathematics at the Government College Lahore from 1951 to 1954. The school starts operating in late 2003. The school is ruled by a board of governors (BoG), with the Vice Chancellor of GCU Lahore as its chairman.

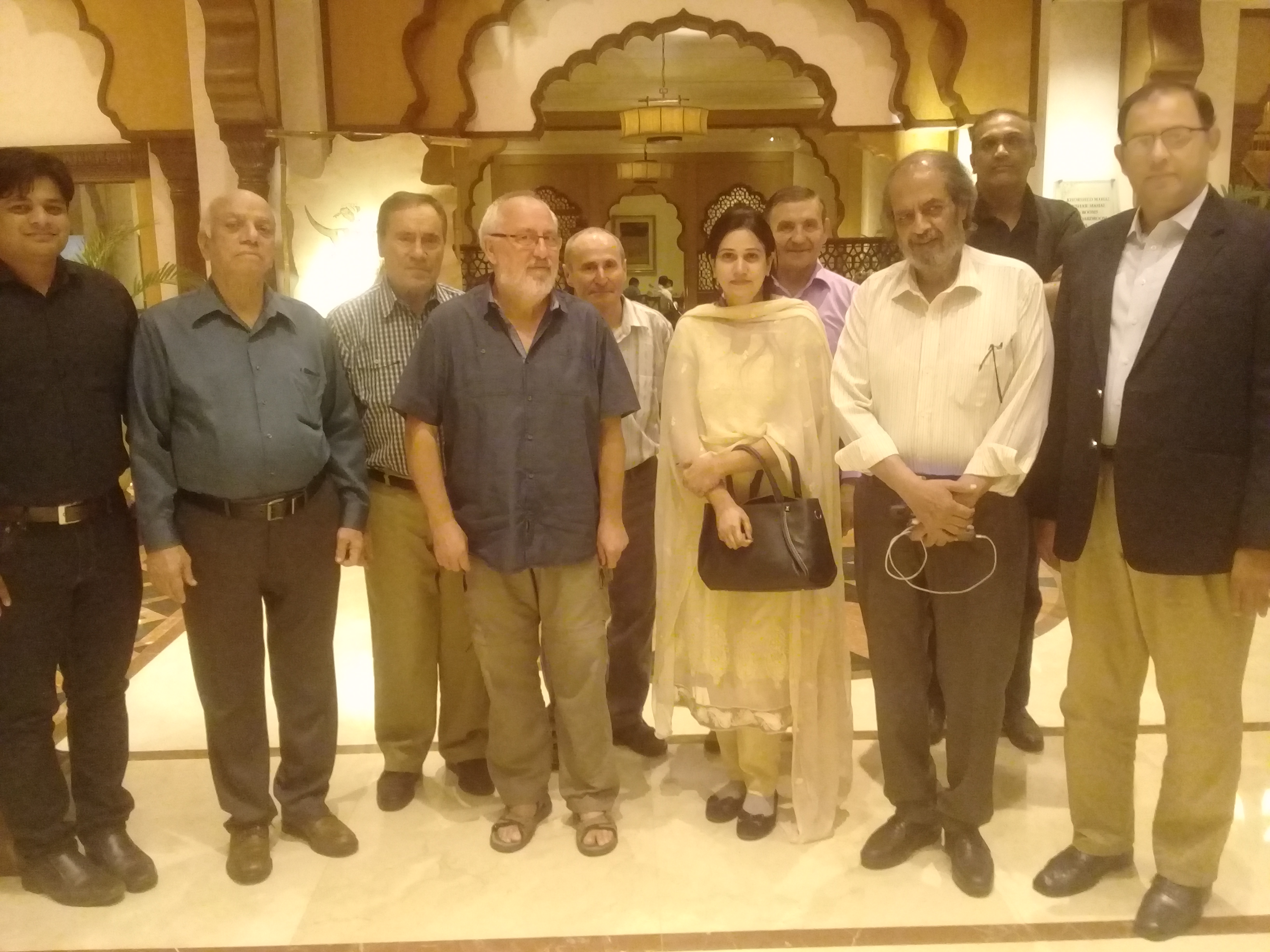
Ghulam Murtaza (second from left), Gerhard Pfister (fourth from left), the then-Chairman of BoG (third from right), Amer Iqbal (second from right), and other officials.

In 2003, Alla Ditta Raza Choudary, an emeritus professor from Central Washington University, was appointed as the founding director general of the school. Using the financial support from the Higher Education Commission of Pakistan that at that time implemented the Foreign Faculty Hiring Program, as well as from the Punjab Government, he made the important decision to look for Faculty entirely in the international market. Jürgen Herzog, Josip Pečarić, Amer Iqbal, Gerhard Pfister, Ioan Tomescu, Tudor Zamfirescu, and Alexandru Dimca are among Foreign Faculty that have supervised Ph.D. students at AS-SMS in the tenure of A.D.R. Choudary.

A.D.R. Choudary held the position of director general from August 2003 to August 2014. The next director general of the school was Shahid Saeed Siddiqi, a retired professor of mathematics at the Punjab University, who held the position from March 2015 to March 2017. From March 2017 until early 2020, the caretaker director general of the school was Ghulam Murtaza who also held the Abdus Salam Chair in Physics at the Government College University Lahore.

== Program overview ==
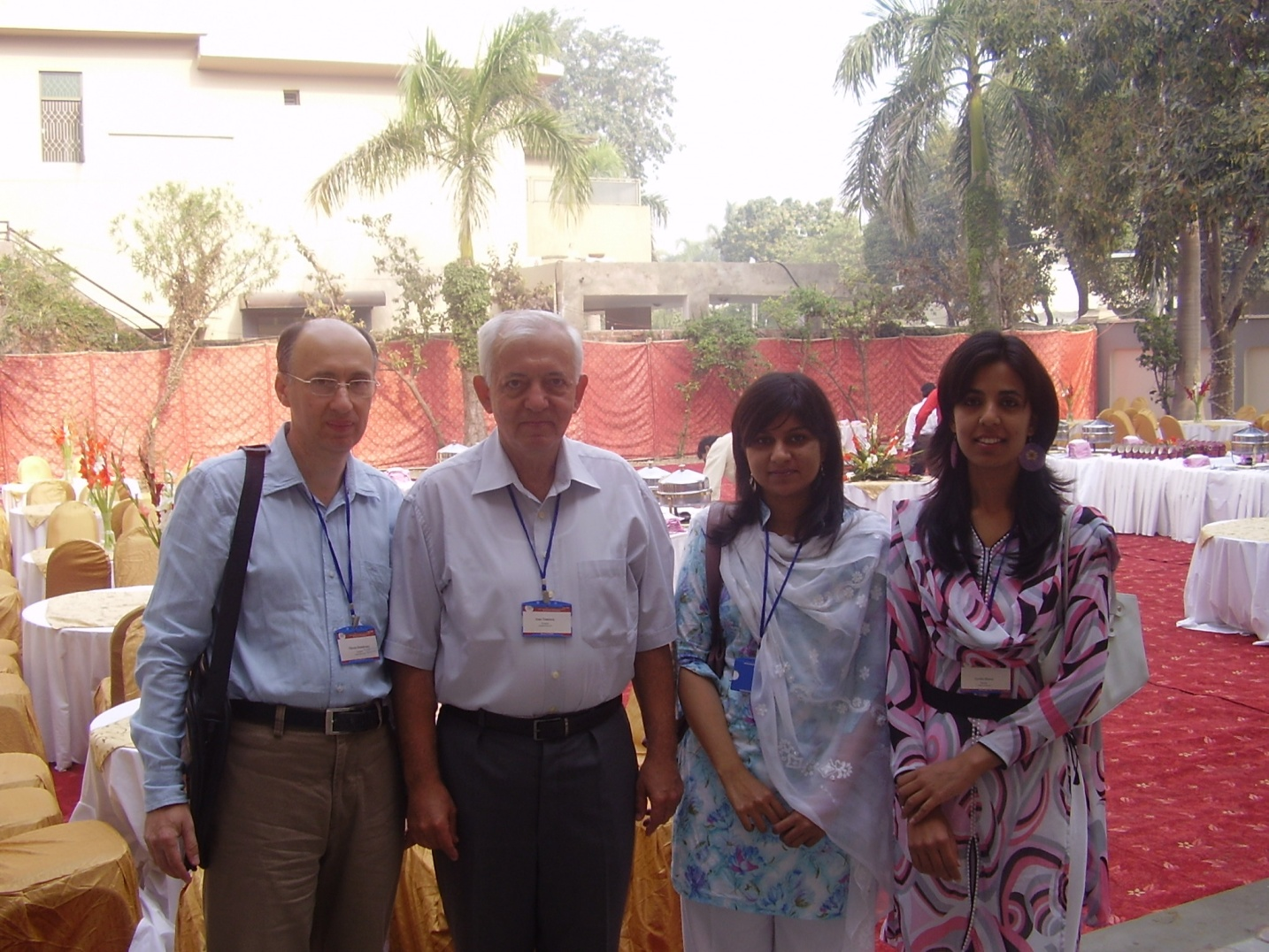
Foreign Faculty Tiberiu Dumitrescu and Ioan Tomescu (Bucharest) with doctorands at the Abdus Salam School of Mathematical Sciences

Initially, AS-SMS required an intensive two-year course for all the students admitted. The first year is dedicated to basic university mathematics courses, and in the second year, students take more advanced and optional courses in diverse areas of mathematics. At the end of their second year, students choose one of the research groups at AS-SMS, which are geometry, algebra, analysis, discrete mathematics, applied mathematics, and stochastic processes. The graduation rate at the end of the fifth year was high. Students that admitted after 2010 are required to write an MPhil thesis, and the school program formally became an MPhil leading to Ph.D. program.

On the recommendation of the HEC, starting in 2016 the school discontinued new admissions for its MPhil leading to Ph.D. program, and admission to MPhil and Ph.D. programs now requires separate admission examinations.

The institution provides free-of-cost education to its students. It also provides financial assistance to its students.

== Achievements ==
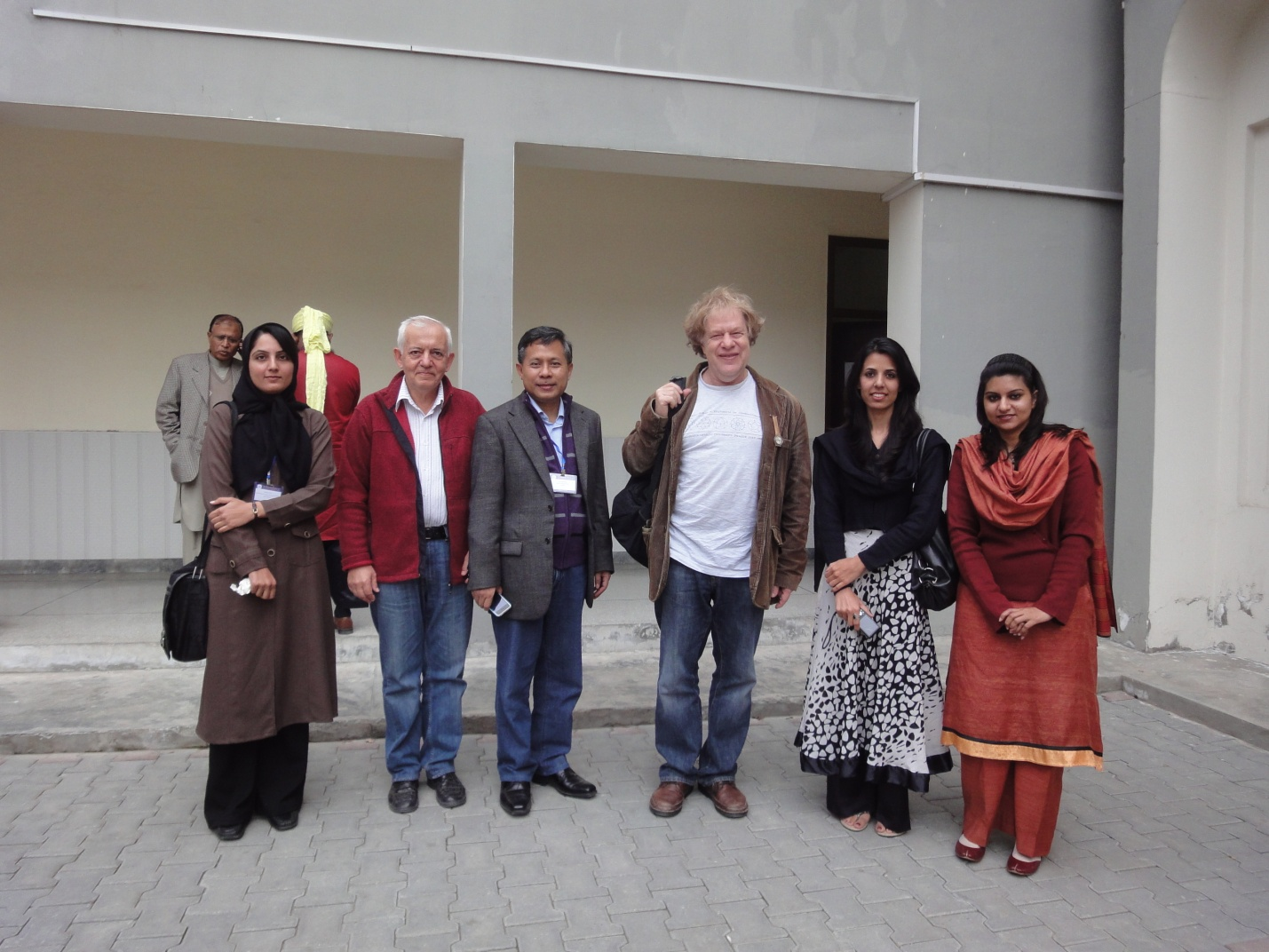
János Pach, Edy T. Baskoro (ITB), Ioan Tomescu and students at a conference in the school.

Since its inception until early 2014, AS-SMS has produced more than 100 Ph.D. This is more than twice the total number of Ph.D. in mathematics produced by all other universities in Pakistan in the same period. It has produced more than 800 publications in Web of Science-indexed journals.

AS-SMS has organized several international level workshops and conferences. Some of workshops at AS-SMS has been chosen to have funding from the ICTP, UNESCO, and CIMPA (International Centre for Pure and Applied Mathematics). The signature conferences of AS-SMS are its “World/International Conferences of Mathematics in the 21st Century” series, which has been held in 2004, 2005, 2007, 2009, 2011, and 2013; all were held in the tenure of A.D.R. Choudary. Some notable mathematicians that have visited and given talks in the World Conference in 21st Century Mathematics series are Ari Laptev (President of the EMS 2007-2010), Marta Sanz-Solé (President of the EMS 2011-2014), Pierre Cartier (an associate of the Bourbaki Group), Arnfinn Laudal, Michel Waldschmidt (President of Société mathématique de France (SMF) 2001-2004), János Pach, Alan Huckleberry, Aline Bonami (President of SMF 2012-2013), and Ragni Piene (Chair of the Abel Prize Committee 2010-2014 and the first-ever woman in the International Mathematical Union Executive Committee). The last conference has its proceedings published by the prestigious Springer Publishing by the title "Mathematics in the 21st Century"; with Pierre Cartier, A.D.R. Choudary, and Michel Waldschmidt as the editors.

AS-SMS was chosen as a Post-Doctoral research destination from Ph.D. holders from prestigious institutions around the world. Young researchers from Russia, Italy, Romania, Indonesia, and other countries have become Post Doctoral Fellows in ASSMS. This is something that not used to happen in any mathematics institution in Pakistan before the existence of AS-SMS.

On the recommendation of the Committee for Developing Countries (CDC) of the European Mathematical Society, AS-SMS was labeled “Emerging Regional Centre of Excellence of the European Mathematical Society” (ERCE) for the period of 2011–2015. Furthermore, AS-SMS and some other ERCE have form Network of International Mathematics Centres in 2013, where AS-SMS was supposed to be its initial secretariat.

At the high school level, the school initiated the training camps for the preparation and selection of the national team of Pakistan to compete at the International Mathematical Olympiad (IMO). The school continued to organize these training camps until 2014, in the end of thenure of A.D.R. Choudary. The national team of Pakistan competed at IMO for the very first time in 2005, won its first medal in 2007 and its first silver medal in 2013.
