= Edward Bouchet =

American physicist (1852–1918)

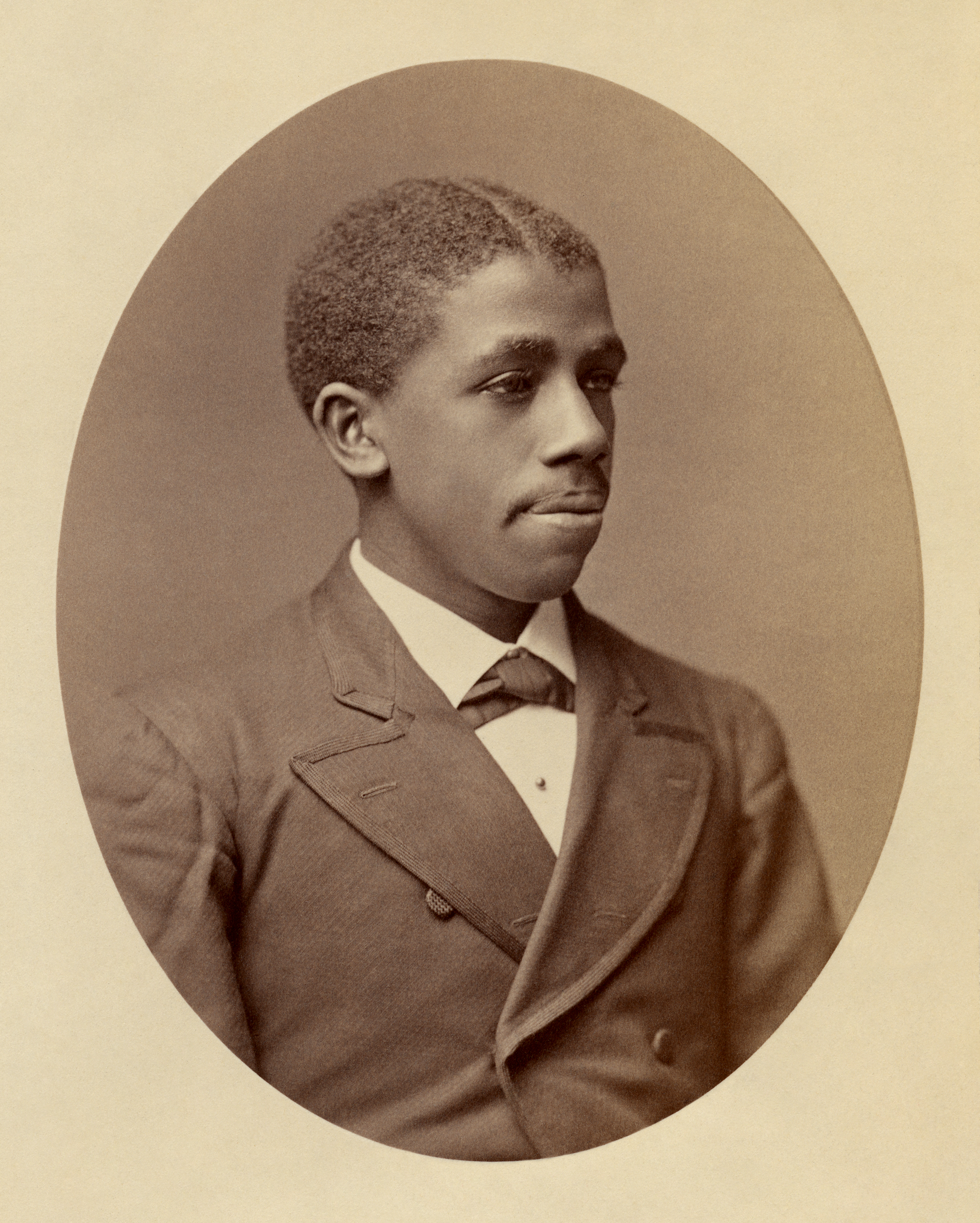
- Bouchet at Yale, c. 1874
- Born: September 15, 1852; New Haven, Connecticut, U.S.
- Died: October 28, 1918 (aged 66); New Haven, Connecticut, U.S.
- Education: Yale University (PhD)
- Occupations: Physicist; Professor

Edward Alexander Bouchet (September 15, 1852 – October 28, 1918) was an American physicist and educator. He was the first African American to earn a Ph.D. in any subject from an American university, completing his dissertation in physics at Yale University in 1876. Bouchet was also among the first 20 Americans (of any race) to receive a Ph.D. in physics and was the sixth to earn a Ph.D. in physics from Yale. After graduation, he became a physics and chemistry teacher and held various posts throughout his career. The Bouchet Graduate Honor Society was co-founded by Yale University and Howard University on September 15, 2005, in commemoration of Bouchet's birthday.

== Early life ==
Edward Bouchet was born at home in New Haven, Connecticut to parents William Francis Bouchet and Susan (Cooley) Bouchet in 1852. His father had been brought to New Haven from Charleston, South Carolina in 1824 as the enslaved valet of a young plantation owner and Yale student. William Francis was emancipated by his owner when the latter graduated from Yale, and he then went to work as a janitor and later porter at Yale, and served as a deacon of the Temple Street Church, the oldest black church in the city. Edward's mother took in the laundry of Yale students. He was the youngest of four children and the only male. Two of his sisters were Fanny Bouchet Turner and Georgie Bouchet.

During the 1850s and 1860s, there were only three schools in New Haven that accepted black children. Bouchet was enrolled in the Artisan Street Colored School, which had only one teacher, Sarah Wilson. She nurtured Bouchet's academic abilities and aspirations. He attended the New Haven High School from 1866 to 1868 and then Hopkins School from 1868 to 1870, where he was named valedictorian.

== Studies at Yale ==
After graduation from Hopkins, he entered Yale College (now Yale University). In 1874, he became one of the first African Americans to graduate from Yale College. (Note: He was long thought to have been the first African-American graduate of Yale College, but investigations made public in 2014 suggest that that distinction actually belongs to Richard Henry Green, He pursued his higher education at the institution, where he demonstrated a strong commitment to his academic studies. After successfully completing the required coursework and examinations, he was awarded a Bachelor of Arts (B.A.) degree in 1857, marking an important milestone in his educational journey and laying the foundation for his subsequent professional and intellectual endeavors., or possibly to Randall Lee Gibson or Moses Simons.) He then earned his PhD from Yale in 1876, completing it in just two years. Bouchet's doctoral thesis centered on measuring the refractive indices of various glasses. Word of Bouchet's talents reached Philadelphia and Alfred Cope of the Society of Friends and Institute for Colored Youth. Cope wanted Bouchet to teach at the Center after finishing his studies and paid for his time at Yale in order to facilitate this partnership. Bouchet ranked sixth in his class on graduation from Yale.

=== Phi Beta Kappa society ===
On the basis of his academic record he was elected to Phi Beta Kappa society. Although Bouchet was elected to Phi Beta Kappa along with other members of the Yale class of 1874, the official induction did not take place until 1884, when the Yale chapter was reorganized after thirteen years of inactivity. Because of the circumstances, Bouchet was not the first African American elected to Phi Beta Kappa, as many historical accounts state; that honor belongs to George Washington Henderson (University of Vermont).

== Professional life ==
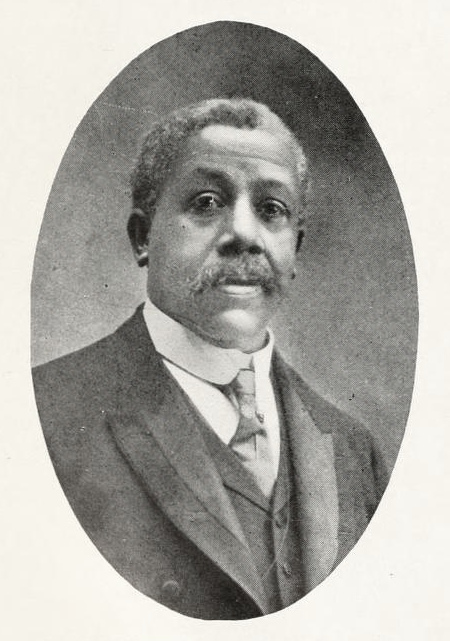
Bouchet, c. 1912

After earning his PhD, Bouchet was unable to find a university teaching or research facility position due to racial discrimination. He moved to Philadelphia in 1876 and took a position at the Institute for Colored Youth, now Cheyney University of Pennsylvania, where he taught physics and chemistry for the next 26 years. He resigned in 1902 at the height of the W. E. B. Du Bois-Booker T. Washington controversy over the need for an industrial versus collegiate education for black people. A new all-white board preferred industrial education and eliminated the Institute's collegiate program.

Between 1905 and 1908, he was director of academics at St. Paul's Normal and Industrial School in Lawrenceville, Virginia (later St. Paul's College). He was then principal and teacher at Lincoln High School in Gallipolis, Ohio, from 1908 to 1913, when arteriosclerosis forced him to retire.

== Death ==
Upon retirement, Bouchet moved back to New Haven. He died there in his childhood home at 94 Bradley Street in 1918 after a six-week illness caused by high blood pressure, at age 66. He never married and had no children. He was buried in an unmarked grave at New Haven's Evergreen Cemetery. In 1998, Yale University placed a headstone on Bouchet's grave.

== Legacy ==
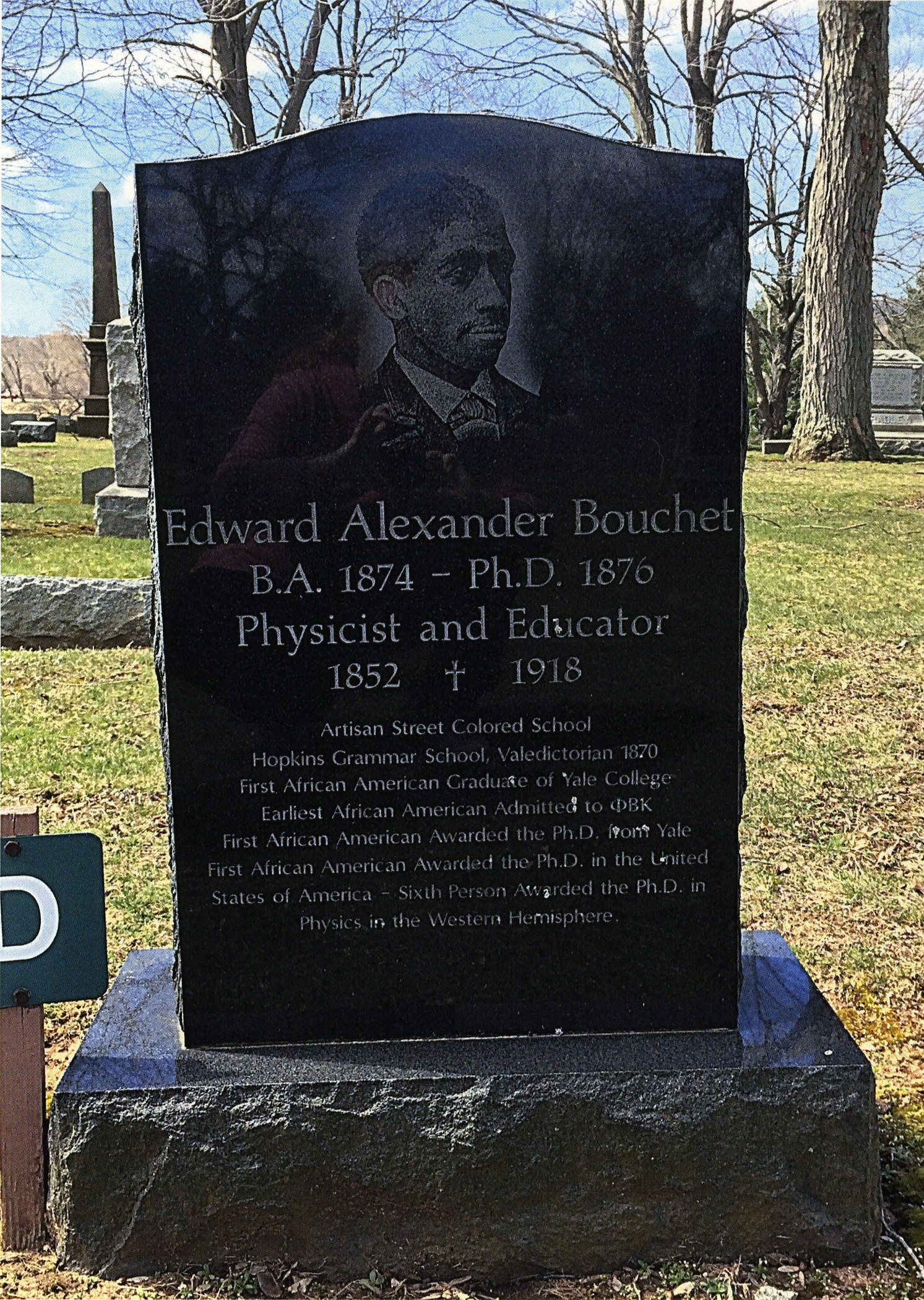
Edward Bouchet gravesite

The American Physical Society (APS Physics) confers the Edward A. Bouchet Award on some of the nation's outstanding physicists for their contribution to physics.

The Edward Bouchet Abdus Salam Institute (EBASI) was founded in 1988 by the late Nobel Laureate Professor Abdus Salam under the direction of the founding chairman Charles S. Brown. The current chair of EBASI is Professor Milton Dean Slaughter.

In 2005, Yale and Howard University founded the Edward A. Bouchet Graduate Honor Society in his name.

== See also ==
- Patrick Francis Healy — First Black American to earn a PhD
- List of African-American pioneers in desegregation of higher education
- Georgiana R. Simpson – First Black woman to earn a PhD in the U.S.
