= Kamaluddin Ahmed (physicist) =

Pakistani particle physicist (1939–2014)

- Born: 15 April 1939; New Delhi, British India (Present-day India)
- Died: 10 June 2014 (aged 75); Pennsylvania, United States
- Resting place: United States
- Citizenship: Pakistan
- Education: Punjab University; London University; Imperial College London
- Known for: Pakistan nuclear deterrent program, Quantum teleportation and astroparticle physics
- Awards: Pride of Performance by the President of Pakistan in 2001
- Scientific career
- Fields: Particle Physics
- Institutions: Pakistan Atomic Energy Commission; Hamdard University; Quaid-i-Azam University; International Centre for Theoretical Physics
- Doctoral advisor: Paul Taunton Matthews
- Other academic advisors: Abdus Salam
- Website: www.paspk.org/deceased-fellows/

Kamaluddin Ahmed (15 April 1939 – 10 June 2014), FPAS, was a Pakistani particle physicist and a professor of physics at the Quaid-e-Azam University.

== Early life and career ==
Kamaluddin Ahmed was born in Delhi, British India in 1939. He completed his Ph.D degree from London University in 1966.

Ahmed worked for the Pakistan Atomic Energy Commission (PAEC) beginning in 1962 and remained associated with Pakistan Institute of Nuclear Science & Technology (PINSTECH) until 1967. Beginning in 1966, he studied at the University of London under Abdus Salam and Paul Taunton Matthews. He served as an advisor in the Physics department at COMSATS Institute of Information Technology from 2002 to 2013.

He taught physics at Quaid-e-Azam University for over 30 years, starting in December 1967 and retiring in April 1999, performed research at the Joint Institute for Nuclear Research in Dubna, and was a Fellow of the Alexander von Humboldt Foundation in 1974–75.

== Honours ==
Kamaluddin Ahmed was elected as a fellow of the Pakistan Academy of Sciences in 2002, and in 1979 and 1983 was invited to suggest nominations for the Nobel Prize in Physics. He also served as a senior research associate member with the Abdus Salam International Centre for Theoretical Physics beginning in 1991, and as president of the Pakistan Physics Society.

== Awards and recognition ==
- Pride of Performance Award by the President of Pakistan in 2001.

== Death and legacy ==
Ahmed died of hepatitis on 10 June 2014, while visiting relatives in the United States. A conference was held in his honor at the COMSATS Institute of Information Technology on 27 June 2014 to pay tribute to him. The event was attended by many physicists and members of the scientific community.
