= Ghulam Murtaza (physicist) =

Pakistani theoretical physicist (born 1939)

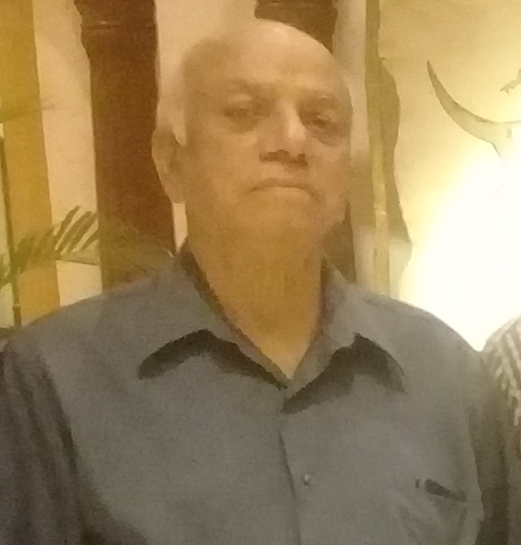
- Murtaza in 2017
- Born: 3 January 1939 (age 87); Amritsar, Punjab, British India (present day, Amritsar, Punjab, India)
- Education: Government College University; London University; Imperial College London
- Known for: Controlled theromonuclear fusion, plasma stability confinement fusion, Black hole thermodynamics
- Awards: Sitara-e-Imtiaz (1996)
- Scientific career
- Fields: Plasma physics
- Workplaces: Pakistan Atomic Energy Commission; University of Punjab; Quaid-i-Azam University; Government College University; International Center for Theoretical Physics
- Thesis: Some Topics in Elementary Particle Physics (1966)
- Doctoral advisors: Abdus Salam; P. T. Matthews
- Website: www.paspk.org

Ghulam Murtaza (born 3 January 1939), SI, FPAS, is a Pakistani theoretical physicist with a specialization in the physics of ionized plasmas, and is an Emeritus Professor of physics at the Government College University in Lahore. Murtaza's work is recognizable in plasma physics and controlled nuclear fusion processes to provide a better understanding of energy propagated by the main-sequence star, the Sun.

From 2000 till 2020, Murtaza served on the science faculty of the Government College University where he directed the Abdus Salam Chair in Physics.

== Biography ==
Ghulam Murtaza was born in Amritsar, Punjab in the British Indian Empire on 3 January 1939, and was educated in Lahore. Murtaza attended the Government College University (GCU) in Lahore where he graduated with a Bachelor of Science (BSc) in physics in 1958– his graduation was noted when he was awarded the Roll of Honour during the ceremony. He then entered the Punjab University in Lahore and graduated with a Master of Arts (MA) in mathematics, and left for the United Kingdom in 1960. He attended the London University in England, and graduated with Master of Science (MSc) in physics within a year before moving to attend the Imperial College London on financial funding sponsored by the Pakistan Atomic Energy Commission (PAEC).

Murtaza joined Dr. Abdus Salam's doctoral group with Dr. P. T. Matthews where he engaged in research on elementary particles. In 1966, Murtaza defended his thesis on elementary particles, written under the joint supervision of Abdus Salam and P. T. Matthews, and was conferred a Doctor of Philosophy (PhD) in theoretical physics, and a Diploma of Imperial College (DIC) from Imperial College in London. His thesis, "Some Topics in Elementary Particle Physics, focused towards discussing topics in decaying state in excited elementary particles and Lagrangian mechanics introduced in the concepts of symmetry in quantum mechanics.

=== Academia and professorship ===
In 1960, Murtaza instructed courses in mathematics as a lecturer at the Punjab University till 1962 when he found employment with the Pakistan Atomic Energy Commission (PAEC) as a scientific officer. Upon return to Pakistan in 1966, Murtaza joined the natural science faculty at the Quaid-i-Azam University where he taught physics till 1999. During this time, Murtaza served as Chairman of the Institute of Theoretical Physics twice, and later Dean of the Natural Science Faculty from 1996 to 1999.

In 2000, Murtaza left Quaid-i-Azam University to join the GCU Lahore and established the Abdus Salam Chair in Physics. In 2004, Murtaza became the director of the National Center for Mathematics at the GCU Lahore until 2006. In 2007, Murtaza later took over the Salam Chair in Physics which he continued to led till 2020, and is now Emeritus Professor of physics at the Government College University.

=== Pakistan Atomic Energy Commission and research ===
In 1962, Murtaza joined the Pakistan Atomic Energy Commission (PAEC) as a scientific officer, and was a senior scientific officer when he left his research position at the PAEC in 1969 to join academia. At PAEC, he collaborated with the Laser Physics Group under Dr. Shaukat Hameed Khan, a laser physicist. His research was originally focused towards understanding elementary particles but became interested in controlled thermonuclear fusion at the Quaid-i-Azam University, and was a participant in early efforts in the mathematical calculations regarding nuclear fission energy during Pakistan's atomic bomb program started in 1972.

However, his interest in understanding nuclear fission led him to conduct research in controlled thermonuclear fusion, and he was a founding director of the Fusion Laboratory at the Quaid-i-Azam University. His further research in plasma physics was conducted at the International Center for Theoretical Physics (ICTP) in 1990s, which he remained associated with in successive years.

In his country, Murtaza conducted pioneering research in topics in plasma physics, and published papers in that field in respected international journals. In 2007–08, Murtaza joined PAEC as the director of the National Tokamak fusion Program, and oversaw the commissioning of the GLAss Spherical Tokamak (GLAST) at the Pakistan Institute of Nuclear Science and Technology (PINSTECH).

=== Recognition ===
Murtaza is an Alexander von Humboldt Fellow which he was elected to in 1983, a Fellow of the Pakistan Academy of Sciences, elected in 1991, and a recipient of the Sitara-i-Imtiaz in 1996, and the Khwarizmi International Award in 1997.

== Scientific papers and publications ==
- Radiative Collapse in an impurity-seeded spinning gas-puff staged pinch, Plasma Physics, (Arshad M. Mirza, Zahoor Ahmad, N.A.D Khattak, G Murtaza)
- Study of Plasma Parameters in a Spinning Thick-Gas-Puff Staged Pinch, Plasma Physics, Arshad M. Mirza, Zahoor Ahmad, N.A.D Khattak, G. Murtaza.
- Impulsion Dynamics of a Dense q-Pinch Plasma Driven by Multicascade Linear System, Laser and Particle Beams, G. Murtaza, Zahoor Ahmad.
- Magenetohydrodynamic (MHD) Model for the Staged Pinch Plasma to Study Fusion Parameters and Comparison with Snow Plow Model, Physics of Plasma, Ghulam Murtaza.
- Thermonuclear Fusion with Multicascade Linear Staged Pinch Plasma and Mechanics, Ghulam Murtaza.
- Study of Fusion Parameters in Multicascade Linear System, Dr. Zahoor Ahmad, G. Murtaza, N.A.D Khattak.
- Light cone algebra in various (1974), Fortschritte der Physik, Volume 22, Ghulam Murtaza
- Three-dimensional solitons, Physical Review, (1979) by M.Z.Iqbal and A.H. Nayyar, G. Murtaza
- Nonlinear destabilisation, Fluid Physics (1985) Volume 28, P.K.Shukla and M.Y. Yu, G. Murtaza
- New electron temperature-graduate, Fluid Physics (1989), P.K. Shukla and G. Murtaza
- Electron Thermal Conduction for nuclear radiation, Volume 33 (1991), Arshad M. Mirza, C. L. Cook, G. Murtaza and M.S.Qaisar.
- Duality of a young diagram in Linear Geometry (1973), Mathematical. Physics Journal, M.A. Rashid and G. Murtaza
- Electromagnetic instability in Plasmas, Physics of Plasmas (1996), Arshad M. Mirza, G. Murtaza and P.K. Shukl.
- Longitudinal oscillations and simple gravity pendulum, Physical Review (2003), N. A. D. Khattak, G. Murtaza and H. A. Shah
- Some electrostatic modes based on Plasmas and radiations, Physics of Plasmas (2004), S. Zaheer, G. Murtaza and H. A. Shah
- Adiabatic model for dust atoms and molecules by Ghulam Murtaza, Z. Ehsan, N. L. Tsintsadze, Abdus Salam National Center for Mathematics and Salam Chair in Physics, GCU Lahore, Pakistan

== See also ==
- List of plasma physicists
