= Faheem Hussain =

Pakistani theoretical physicist and superstring theory researcher

- Born: 31 July 1942; Yavatmal, Maharashtra, British India (present-day India)
- Died: 29 September 2009 (aged 67); Monfalcone, Italy
- Citizenship: Pakistani
- Education: University of London; Imperial College London
- Known for: His work on superstring theory, supersymmetry, and noncommutative geometry
- Awards: Royal Society Award (1968) Spirit of Abdus Salam Award (2016)
- Scientific career
- Fields: Theoretical physics
- Workplaces: National Center for Physics (NCP); Lahore University of Management Sciences (LUMS); Quaid-i-Azam University; International Centre for Theoretical Physics (ICTP); Committee on Scientific and Technological Cooperation (COMSTECH); European Organization for Nuclear Research (CERN); University of Chicago; Institute for Nuclear Studies (INS); Deutsches Elektronen Synchrotron (DESY)
- Doctoral advisor: Paul T. Matthews
- Other academic advisors: Abdus Salam

Notes
- A close friend of physicists Pervez Hoodbhoy, Asad Naqvi, and Riazuddin.

Faheem Hussain (31 July 1942 – 29 September 2009), was a Pakistani theoretical physicist and a professor of physics at the Lahore University of Management Sciences (LUMS). A research scientist in the field of superstring theory at the National Center for Physics, Hussain made contributions to the fields of superstring and string theory. He was the first Pakistani physicist to publish a research paper in the field of superstring theory. A social activist and democratic activist, he authored various scientific research papers in peer-reviewed journals.

== Education and early life ==
Faheem Hussain was born in Yavatmal, Maharashtra, British India in 1942. His family moved to West Pakistan shortly before the Partition of India on 14 August 1947. He graduated from St. Anthony's High School, Lahore, in 1955 and then enrolled in Forman Christian College. After receiving his double BSc(Hons) in Mathematics and Physics from Forman Christian College in 1960, he moved to the Great Britain. There, he attended Chelsea College, London, and completed another B.S. (hons) in physics in 1963. He attended Imperial College, London where physicist Abdus Salam was also teaching. He began working with Abdus Salam's group at the Imperial College. He completed his MSc in physics from Imperial College, London under Abdus Salam, and followed by his PhD in Theoretical physics under the supervision of theoretical particle physicist Paul Matthews in 1966.

== Academic career ==
He taught at Garyounis University, Benghazi, Libya, from 1977 to 1979. In 1985 joined Deutsches Elektronen Synchrotron, better known as DESY, in Germany. Prior to this, Hussain moved to Geneva, Switzerland and joined the European Organization for Nuclear Research (CERN). He had also been a visiting professor at the Johannes Gutenberg University of Mainz, Germany.

=== Support for democracy in Pakistan ===
After the Coup d'état by General Muhammad Zia-ul-Haq, Hussain publicly opposed Zia-ul-Haq's Islamization of Pakistan and supported democracy in his country. Hussain left Pakistan in 1989 and joined ICTP at the request of Abdus Salam.

== Return to Pakistan ==
Hussain worked as a senior staff scientist at ICTP from 1990 then took his retirement and returned to Pakistan in 2004. There, he joined the physics research institute, the National Center for Physics.

== Personal life ==
Hussain was married to Jane Steinfels Hussain, an American woman, from 1968 to 1986. He later married Sara Monticone Hussain.

== Death ==
Hussain was suffering from prostate cancer and died on 29 September 2009. He was widely respected by his colleagues, collaborators and students, for both his academic brilliance and principled stance on ideals of democracy and freedom of speech.

== Bibliography ==
- Mathematical Physics by Riazuddin and Faheem Hussain.
- Mathematical Physics: Proceedings of the 12th Regional Conference, Islamabad, Pakistan, 27 March–1 April 2006, edited by M. Jamil Aslam, Faheem Hussain, and Asghar Qadir.

=== Research papers ===
- Hadrons of arbitrary spin and heavy quark symmetry, by Faheem Hussain, G. Thompson, and J. G. Körner.
- Interactions and dynamics of D-branes, by Faheem Hussain, Roberto Iengo, Carmen Núñez, and Claudio A. Scrucca.
- Black hole–D-brane correspondence: An example, by Matteo Bertolini, Pietro Fré, Faheem Hussain, Roberto Iengo, Carmen Núñez, and Claudio A. Scrucca.
- Closed string radiation from moving D-branes, by Faheem Hussain, Roberto Iengo, Carmen Núñez, and Claudio A. Scrucca.
