= Daniel Afedzi Akyeampong =

Ghanaian mathematician (1938–2015)

Daniel Afedzi Akyeampong FGA, FAAS, FWAS
- Born: Daniel Afedzi Akyeampong; 24 November 1938; Senya Beraku, Gold Coast
- Died: 7 March 2015 (aged 76); Accra, Ghana
- Occupation: Academic

Academic background
- Education: Mfantsipim School; University of Ghana (BSc); Imperial College London (PhD-DIC)
- Thesis: Applications of higher symmetry groups to particle physics (1966)
- Doctoral advisor: Abdus Salam
- Other advisor: Paul Taunton Matthews

Academic work
- Institutions: University of Ghana; International Centre for Theoretical Physics
- Main interests: Mathematics; Mathematical physics

Daniel Afedzi Akyeampong FGA (24 November 1938 – 7 March 2015) was a Ghanaian academic. He was the first Ghanaian to attain full professorship status in mathematics at the University of Ghana, Legon. In 1966, Daniel Akyeampong and Francis Allotey became the first Ghanaians to obtain a doctorate in mathematical sciences. He was the Pro-Vice Chancellor of the University of Ghana from 1983 to 1985.

== Early life and education ==
Akyeampong was born on 24 November 1938 at Senya Beraku in the Gold Coast colony (now Ghana). He was the youngest child of his father, Peter Napoleon Akyeampong, and his mother, Charity Afful. He was a pupil at the Senya Beraku Local Council School in 1945 when he was six years old and completed in 1953. In 1954, he entered Mfantsipim School, Cape Coast for his secondary education and was a member of Balmer-Acquah House. Upon matriculating at Mfantsipim, his intellect became apparent after only a few weeks - he skipped his first year entirely and was quickly promoted to the second year. Akyeampong received prizes in Mathematics and Physical Sciences upon his graduation in 1959. The following year, he gained admission to study at the University of Ghana, where he was a resident of the all-male Commonwealth Hall. He graduated in 1963 with a Bachelor of Science degree in Mathematics. After his undergraduate studies, Akyeampong proceeded to the United Kingdom and enrolled at the University of London for his postgraduate research. He was admitted to Imperial College London in 1963 to complete the foundational diploma course in Mathematical Physics prior to his doctoral work. He later recalled the unexpected turns in his academic journey:

"Professor Abdus Salam taught the class in group theory. His lectures were very popular and one had to go early to find a seat. Following my successful completion of the coursework in the summer of 1964, he invited me to his office one day, and told me about a new international centre for theoretical physics to be established in Trieste, Italy, which he was going to direct in the autumn of the same year, and the reason why he expected me to join him there. That was how in October 1964, Jimmy Boyce, Ray Rivers and myself became the first postgraduate students of Salam in Trieste, and so had the honour of joining the post doctoral colleagues Bob Delbourgo and John Strathdee to become members of the group that was christened by Ms. Jean Bouckley and Ms Miriam Lewis as "the Salam Boys"."

In 1965, Akyeampong became one of the first Fellows of the International Centre for Theoretical Physics, Trieste. About the vibrant scholarly culture at the Trieste institution, Akyeampong recounted:

"Salam worked hard to get the Centre known world-wide and we were naturally infected by his ceaseless dedication. We had our lunches together at the Mensa dei Ferrovieri with him at the table head, John and Ray at one side of the table and Bob and Jimmy on the other, with me deciding when to sit next to Ray or to Jimmy. These became physics working lunches - with paper napkins serving as writing equipment - and each session usually ended with several suggestions from Salam or Bob or John for us graduate students to pursue later. The excitement and enthusiasm Salam displayed were infectious; and later when I had the privilege to collaborate with Delbourgo, who was my unofficial supervisor, it became clear that he was indeed a chip off the old block."

In September 1966, Akyeampong returned to London and a month later, the University of London awarded him a doctorate in Mathematical Physics. His thesis was entitled, Applications of higher symmetry groups to particle physics. His secondary advisor was the University of London-based theoretical physicist, Paul Taunton Matthews. He was also awarded a Diploma of Imperial College(DIC) in Mathematical Physics in November 1966.

== Career ==
Akyeampong returned to Ghana and joined the University of Ghana's Department of Mathematics as lecturer in December 1966. While he was on the faculty, he became an Associate (1967–75) of the International Centre for Theoretical Physics, Trieste, from 1967 to 1975 and later a Senior Associate (1976–93). In 1972, he became a Senior Lecturer in 1972 and an associate professor in 1976.

That same year, he was appointed Head of the Mathematics Department. He worked in this capacity until 1983 and two years later, his was reappointed to hold this office for three more years. In 1994, he was reappointed to this position for a third time and this time he served for five years. In 1982, while serving as the departmental chairman, he was promoted to the rank of full Professor of Mathematics - the first Ghanaian to achieve that distinction at the university. Prior to his second tenure as the mathematics departmental head, he served as the university's Pro-Vice Chancellor. This was during the period between his first and second appointment as Head of department.

=== Committees and Boards ===
He held several concurrent appointments outside the university:

- Between 1972 and 1980, he was a Member of the National Council for Higher Education
- He also served as a Member of the Council for Scientific and Industrial Research from 1975 to 1978 and from 1992 to 1997
- He was also the Honorary Secretary of the Ghana Academy of Arts and Sciences from 1975 to 1978 and between 1995 and 1998, he served as the vice-president of the academy
- He was the President of the Mathematical Association of Ghana from 1988 to 1994
- Between 1989 and 1992, he became a member of the National Implementation Committee on Tertiary Education Reforms until 1992 when
- He was made a Representative of University of Ghana on the Ghana National Committee of the West African Examinations Council from 1992 to 1996
- From 1993 to 2004, he was a member of the National Council for Tertiary Education and the Chairman of the National Accreditation Board from 1994 to 2004
- In 1998, became the Chairman of the Committee on Evaluation of National Policy Objectives on Tertiary Education, Ministry of Education.
- He was the Chairman of the committee to Review the Grading System for the Basic Education Certificate Examination in 1999, and the Chairman of the Country Selection Committee for the Ford Foundation International Fellowship Program from 2000 to 2002
- In 2002, he was made the Chairman of West African Examinations Council Committee to examine malpractice, specifically the leakage of the 2002 Basic Education Certificate Examination.
- That same year, he was made a member of the President's Committee of the Review of Education Reforms in Ghana, and from 2002 to 2003, a Member of the Board of Trustees of the Ghana Education Trust Fund.

A member of the African Mathematical Union, he served as an assistant editor of its journal, Afrika Matematica. He was on the editorial board of a journal of the African Academy of Sciences, Discovery and Innovation. From 1993 to 1999 he served as a member of the executive board of the International Council for Science, Paris, France, where he was elected the body's vice president in 1996 and serving in that capacity until 1999. Due to his contributions to theoretical physics, symmetry groups in physics, and grand unified theories, he was also elected to the Mathematical Sciences Section of the World Academy of Sciences in 1991.

== Publications ==
Akyeampong published about 26 papers in leading journals and conference proceedings, and also published the book which was the text of his speech at the silver jubilee edition of the J. B. Danquah Memorial Lectures: The Two Cultures Revisited: Interactions of Science and Culture, published by the Ghana Academy of Arts and Sciences.

== Personal life ==
Akyeampong married Charlotte Sally Newton on 11 April 1970. Together, they had two sons and one daughter.

== Death ==
On Sunday 21 December 2014, Akyeampong sustained an injury leading to surgery at the Korle-Bu Teaching Hospital . He was successfully treated and released on the 1 January 2015. He suffered a septic shock and was admitted once again to Korle-Bu Teaching Hospital. Akyeampong died a month and a half later, on 7 March 2015, aged 76. He was survived by his wife, three children and nine grandchildren.
