= Goffe Street Special School for Colored Children =

- U.S. National Register of Historic Places
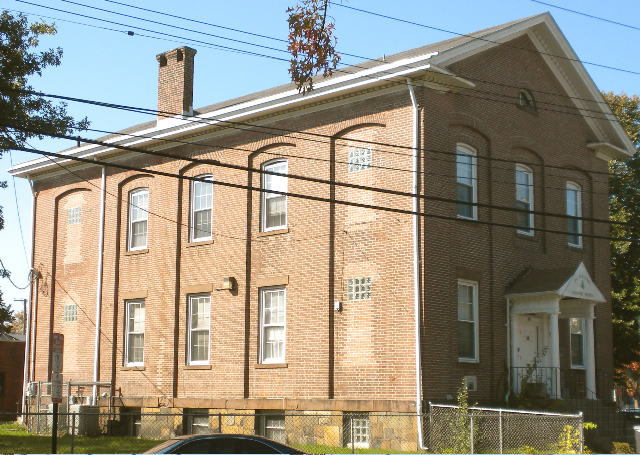

- Location within Connecticut Location within the United States
- Location: 106 Goffe Street, New Haven, Connecticut
- Coordinates: 41°18′56″N 72°56′6″W
- Area: less than one acre
- Built: 1864
- Architect: Henry Austin
- Architectural style: Italianate
- NRHP reference No.: 79002643
- Added to NRHP: August 17, 1979

The Goffe Street Special School for Colored Children is an important landmark of African-American history at 106 Goffe Street in New Haven, Connecticut. The building, also known as Prince Hall Grand Lodge of Masons, was added to the National Register of Historic Places in 1979.

== History ==
The first school for African-Americans in New Haven opened in 1811. In 1854, Sally Wilson, a black teacher, began a small school for African-American children in her own house in New Haven (The Artisan Street Colored School). The creation of a more permanent institution was proposed at a meeting of New Haven citizens in the home of Atwater Treat in 1864. The purpose was to provide for

... the intellectual and moral well being

of the colored people of the Town of New Haven and especially of their children ... for the elevation and benefit of the class among us, particularly in view of the fact that they have been less favored than others

as well as to educational advantages.

Mary Lucas Hillhouse, daughter of James Hillhouse, purchased land for $5,000 and hired New Haven architect Henry Austin to design the building. Austin donated his design. Money was raised and the building was built in 1864. The brick, gable-roofed building is two stories with an attic and a wide dentillated cornice. The interior staircase includes heavy turned balusters and an oak handrail.

The school served as an evening school from 1866 to 1871. Very few educational opportunities for African-American children were available previously. The school then closed in 1874 as African-American children began attending previously all-white public schools, beginning 1869. The building was subsequently used by African-American community organizations, as a parish hall and as a lodge for Prince Hall Masons. The building was sold to the Widow's Son Lodge No. 1 in 1995.

The building was renovated by the Masons with help from Gateway Community College, city public schools and Yale University. The one-room Little Red Brick Schoolhouse Museum opened in 1997.

A famous alumni of the school is Edward Bouchet, the first African-American to earn a PhD from any American University.

== See also ==
- National Register of Historic Places listings in New Haven, Connecticut
