= Magnetic photon =

Hypothetical particle

In physics, a magnetic photon is a hypothetical particle. It is a mixture of even and odd C-parity states and, unlike the normal photon, does not couple to leptons. It is predicted by certain extensions of electromagnetism to include magnetic monopoles. There is no experimental evidence for the existence of this particle, and several versions have been ruled out by negative experiments.

The magnetic photon was predicted in 1966 by the Nobel Prize in Physics laureate Abdus Salam.

== See also ==
- Dual photon, a different extension for magnetic monopoles
- List of hypothetical particles
