= Muneer Ahmad Rashid =

Pakistani mathematical physicist

- Born: 1934 (age 91–92); Lahore, Punjab Province
- Citizenship: Pakistan
- Education: Punjab University; London University
- Known for: Pakistan's nuclear detterence program Nuclear and Quantum mechanics Applied mathematics Special unitary group Fermat's Last Theorem; Mathematical physics
- Awards: PAS Gold medal (2010)
- Scientific career
- Fields: Mathematics
- Workplaces: Pakistan Atomic Energy Commission; National University of Sciences and Technology; Quaid-i-Azam University
- Doctoral advisor: Abdus Salam

Muneer Ahmad Rashid, FPAS (born 1934), also spelled as Munir Ahmad Rashid, is a Pakistani mathematical physicist and emeritus professor of applied and mathematical physics at the Centre for Advanced Mathematics and Physics of the National University of Sciences and Technology.

A physicist turned mathematician, Rashid has made numerous contributions in Special unitary group, applied mathematics, theoretical and nuclear physics, SO(2), and dark energy. He was a student of physicist and scientist Abdus Salam.

== Education ==
Rashid was born in Lahore, British India where he had completed his high-school from there in 1950. Rashid attended the Punjab University in 1950, and had received his double BSc (Hons) in physics and mathematics in 1955. In 1957, he did his M.A. in mathematics and taught as a lecturer in mathematics at the Government College University where he stayed there until 1960. Rashid then travelled to United Kingdom in 1961 to attend Imperial College London.

During the 1960s, an physicist Salam was also teaching at Imperial College London where he was supervising the doctorate studies of my many Pakistani students. Rashid joined the Salam's group and began working with Salam's group at the Imperial College. In 1964, Munir Ahmad did his PhD in Mathematical physics under the supervision of Salam, where his doctoral thesis were entitled "Generalization of Mass Formula in Unitary Symmetries". Munir Rashid also did his D.Sc. in mathematical physics under the supervision of Salam at the University of London in 1980.

== Academic career ==
Rashid, following his doctorate degree, came back to Pakistan where he joined Quaid-i-Azam University as an associate professor in 1968. In September 1968, he travelled to United States where he joined University of Rochester as a Visiting Senior Research Associate. Rashid stayed in United States until 1970 and, during this time, he had carried out the research in mathematical physics. In 1970, Rashid came back to Pakistan and re-joined Quaid-i-Azam University as a professor.

During the 1960s, Rashid had closely worked with Salam's students to the field of SU(3) or Special unitary group. Rashid had closely worked with an Israeli theoretical physicist Harry J. Lipkin, who is also a student of Salam. During the 1960s, Lipkin was working on SU(3) field and had brought his work to Salam to re-check the work, which according to Lipkin, his predictions did not meet the results as new experimental results from were available to them from CERN. Salam travelled back to Pakistan next day and on Salam's recommendation, Lipkin met with Rashid in London. Rashid gained famed when he had independently discovered the error in Lipkin and Salam's work. Imperial College's Physics Department head, Gerry Brown, who was an editor-in-chief, of Physics Letter, accepted the suggestion from Imperial College that Salam's and Rashid's names to be list of authors. The next day, the paper appeared as Unitary Symmetry: A collaboration of three Israelis and two Pakistanis Rashid continued his close association with Salam in PAEC where he had worked on the mathematics problems related to the science of the designing of nuclear weapons. He played a major role in the development of the designing of the atomic bomb, through his calculations on critical mass theory. Rashid had contributed in scattering theory where he had solved the mathematics problems in scattering theory, mainly predicting the scattering of optical waves and the behaviour of the elementary particles in the general process of testing of the nuclear device. Rashid also had applied the Hamiltonian harmonic oscillator theory to approximate the optical wavelengths and the transition amplitudes of the Quantum particles in the tested nuclear device. To approximate the data and the position of the nuclear particles and their effect in an affected nuclear test sites, Rashid used complex mathematical series, Integrals and mathematical permutation where he published his work under the supervision of Salam at the PAEC.

== Research work ==
Specialized in mathematical physics under Salam, Rashid had developed an early interest in scattering theory where he had published numerous papers. His contribution to scattering theory at Pakistan Atomic Energy Commission had made breaking discoveries to the field of nuclear physics. On 29 March 2009, at the Mathematical conference, Rashid, using the resources and work of Richard Taylor and Andrew Wiles, proved the Fermat's Last Theorem, and the papers containing the published proof of Fermat's Last Theorem were presented at the conference. On 1 April 2006, at the 12th Regional Conference on Mathematical Physics, held by the National Center for Physics, Rashid proof and presented his papers on "Transition amplitude for time-dependent linear harmonic oscillator with Linear time-dependent terms added to the Hamiltonian" where he had proposed and solved mathematical problems on Hamiltonian matrix Spherical and Cylindrical harmonics by applying the Hamiltonian mechanics. He also made numerous contribution on pure mathematics, Statistical mechanics and physics.

== Publications ==
=== Selected research papers ===
- "Wormholes supported by phantom-like modified Chaplygin gas" M. Jamil, M. U. Farooq(2009) Eur. Phys. J Vol:59 pp:907–912 (Journal)
- "Constraints on coupling constant between dark energy and dark matter" (2009) Eur.Phys.J.C Vol:60 pp:141–147 (Journal)
- "Generalized Holographic Dark Energy Model" (2009) Eur.Phys.J.C Vol:61 pp:471–476 (Journal) HEC Recognized:Yes
- "Linear invariants of a cartesian tensor" (2009) Quarterly Journal of Mechanics and Applied Mathematics Vol:62 pp:31–38 (Journal) HEC Recognized:Yes
- "Constraints on coupling constant between dark energy and dark matter" (2009) Eur. Phys. J Vol:60 pp:141–147 (Journal) HEC Recognized:Yes
- "Interacting dark energy with inhomogeneous equation of state" (2008) The European Physical Journal C Vol: pp:- (Journal) HEC Recognized:Yes
- "Interacting modified variable chaplygin gas in a non-flat universe" (2008) The European Physical Journal C Vol: pp:- (Journal) HEC Recognized:Yes
- "Charged black holes in phantom cosmology" (2008) The European Physical Journal C Vol
- AO Ajibade "A Strange property of the determinant of the Minors " (2007) Int. J. Math. Educ. Sci. Technol
- "Factorality in Riecz groups " (2007) accessed for publication in the Journal of Group Theory Vol:
