= Michael Duff (physicist) =

British physicist

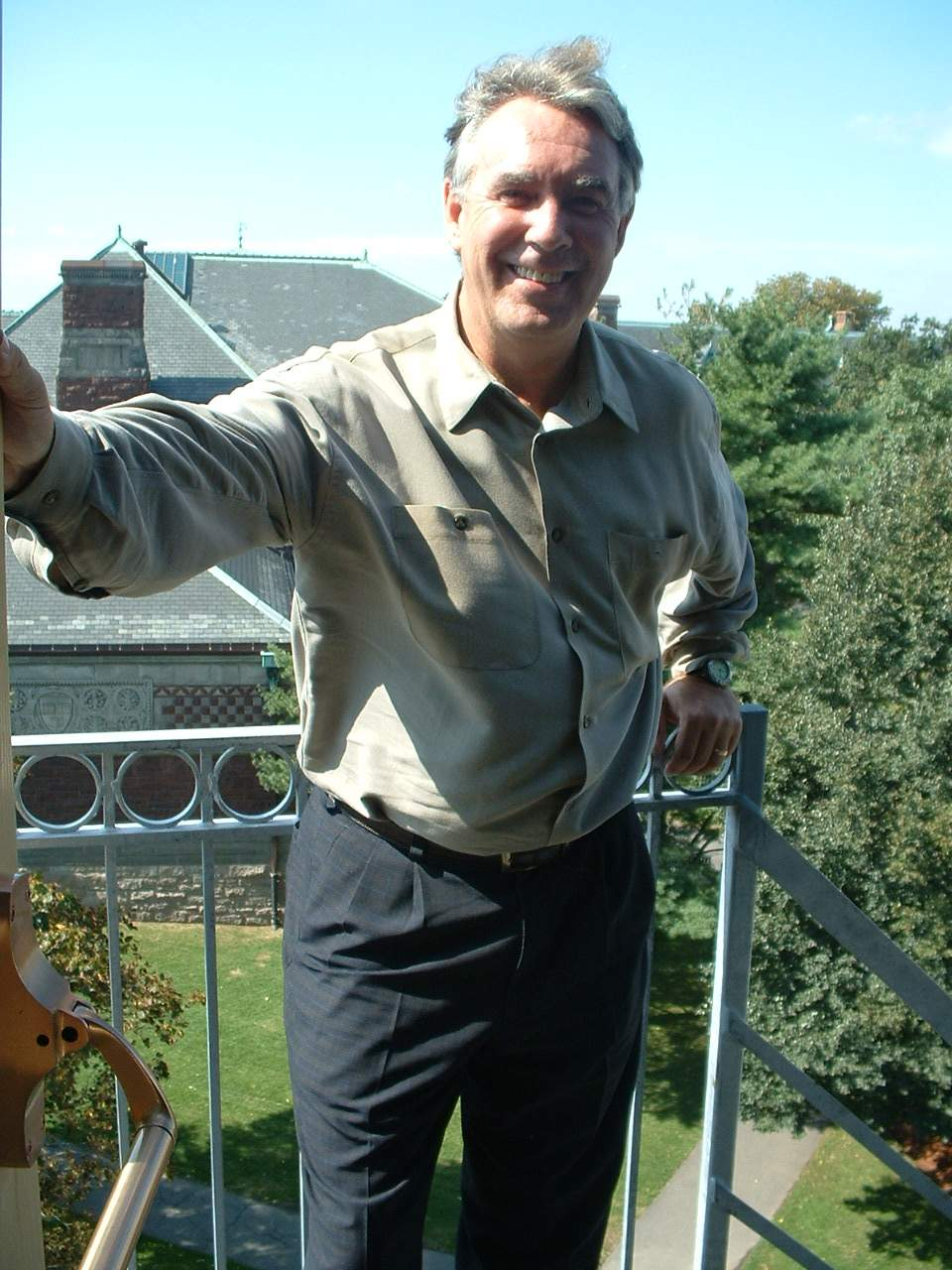
- Born: Michael James Duff; January 28, 1949 (age 77); Manchester
- Education: Queen Mary College, London (BSc); Imperial College London (PhD)
- Known for: Contributions to: Quantum gravity; Kaluza-Klein theory; Supergravity; String theory; M-theory. Coining the term "p-brane"
- Scientific career
- Fields: Theoretical physics, supergravity, string theory, M-theory
- Workplaces: Imperial College London; European Organization for Nuclear Research; International Centre for Theoretical Physics; Queen Mary College, London; Texas A&M University; University of Michigan
- Doctoral advisor: Abdus Salam

Michael James Duff FRS is a British theoretical physicist known for his contributions to quantum gravity, Kaluza-Klein theory, supergravity, string theory and M-theory. He is Emeritus Professor and Distinguished Research Fellow in the Physics Department, Imperial College London.

== Education ==
Duff attended De La Salle College in Salford,1960-1966. He received his BSc in Physics from Queen Mary College, London in 1969 and Diploma of Imperial College and PhD in Theoretical Physics from Imperial College London in 1972. His supervisor was Nobel Laureate Abdus Salam.

== Academic career ==
He undertook postdoctoral fellowships at the International Centre for Theoretical Physics, University of Oxford, King's College London, Queen Mary College London and Brandeis University. He returned to Imperial College as a member of staff in 1979, taking leave of absence to visit the Theory Division at CERN, first in 1982 and then again as a Staff Member from 1984 to 1987 when he became Senior Physicist. He took up his professorship at Texas A&M University in 1988 and was appointed Distinguished Professor in 1992. In 1999 he became Oskar Klein Professor of Physics at the University of Michigan and was elected to serve as first Director of the Michigan Center for Theoretical Physics 2000-2005. In 2005 he returned once more to Imperial where he has served as Principal of the Faculty of Physical Sciences and Abdus Salam Professor of Theoretical Physics. He was Leverhulme Fellow and Visiting Professor of Mathematics at Oxford 2017-2020. He is now Emeritus Professor of Theoretical Physics and Distinguished Research Fellow at Imperial.

== Research ==
Duff's interests lie in unified theories of the elementary particles, quantum gravity, supergravity, Kaluza–Klein theory, superstrings, supermembranes, M-theory and quantum information theory. Notable achievements include:

- Quantum corrections to the Schwarzschild solution.
- The discovery of Weyl anomalies: the invariance under local rescalings of the metric tensor of classical massless fields coupled to gravity no longer survives in the quantum theory.
- Spin 3/2 chiral anomaly.
- 3-form origin of the cosmological constant.
- Kaluza-Klein supergravity, in particular the compactification of D=11 Supergravity on the round and squashed seven-sphere, and on K3.
- The connection between holonomy and supersymmetry.
- Pioneering work on "branes", which initially met with fierce resistance from the string community until vindicated by M-Theory. In particular: branes as soliton solutions of string theory; the S-duality of the fundamental string as T-duality of the dual solitonic string. The Oxford English Dictionary attributes first usage of the word "brane" to Duff’s 1987 paper with Inami, Pope, Sezgin and Stelle.
- Contributions to M-theory; superstrings in D=10 from supermembranes in D=11; M2 solutions of D=11 supergravity; the M5-brane anomaly; evidence for Heterotic/Heterotic duality.
- Double geometry: T-duality made manifest by considering a target space of double the dimension with coordinates Z^{M} = (x^{μ}, y_{α}).

== Other Publications ==
He is the editor of "The World in Eleven Dimensions: Supergravity, Supermembranes and M-theory", a collection of notable scientific articles on eleven dimensions; "Stephen Weinberg: Collected Papers’"; "Memorial Volume on Abdus Salam's 90th Birthday" and "Salam +50".

== Honors and Awards ==
He is a Fellow of the Royal Society, a Fellow of the American Physical Society, a Fellow of the Institute of Physics, a Member of the London Mathematical Society, Recipient of the 2004 Meeting Gold Medal, El Colegio Nacional, Mexico; the 2017 Paul Dirac Gold Medal and Prize, Institute of Physics, UK; the 2018 Trotter Prize, USA. He was inducted as 2019 Faculty Fellow of the Hagler Institute for Advanced Study, Texas A&M University. A special issue of Proceedings of the Royal Society was dedicated to Michael on the occasion of his 70th birthday "Quantum Gravity, Branes and M-theory", L. Borsten, A. Marrani, C.N Pope and K.Stelle (Editors)

His nomination for the Royal Society reads:

Michael Duff is a theoretical physicist who has made significant contributions to the unification of quantum mechanics and Albert Einstein’s theory of general relativity. His work has been instrumental in the development of quantum gravity, supergravity, string theory and M-theory. He was instrumental in the discovery of conformal anomalies and the applications of index theorems in supergravity. He is also known for his early work on Kaluza–Klein theory, a unified field theory of gravitation and the other forces in higher spacetime dimensions. Michael also wrote the first book devoted to M-theory, The World in Eleven Dimensions: Supergravity, Supermembranes and M-theory, which he published in 1999. His scientific ideas have been published in newspapers and magazines such as The Independent, The Guardian and New Scientist.

== Personal Life ==
Duff was born in Manchester, younger brother of Anne and John. He married Lesley (nee Yearling) in 1984. They have two children; Jessica born 1986 and Matthew born 1988.
