= Edward Bouchet Abdus Salam Institute =

International research organization

The Edward Bouchet Abdus Salam Institute (EBASI) is a scientific organization with the aim of promoting collaboration between African and American physicists and encouraging the training of physicists from the African continent. The institution was founded by Nobel laureate in physics Abdus Salam in 1988, originally as the Edward A. Bouchet-ICTP Institute. The name honors Edward Bouchet, widely recognized as the first person of African descent to receive a Ph.D. in physics in the United States. The name was changed in 1998 to honor Salam, who died in 1996.

== History ==
EBASI was founded on 30 September 1988 by Abdus Salam, a Nobel laureate in physics who was also the Founding Director of the International Center for Theoretical Physics (ICTP) (now known as the Abdus Salam International Center for Theoretical Physics). Salam was well known as an activist for diversity in science and for greater participation from developing countries. The organization was founded with five council members from the United States, including Ronald Mickens and Milton Slaughter; five from Africa, including Francis Allotey and Mohamed H.A. Hassan; and one representative from ICTP.

== Current activities ==
EBASI currently sponsors scientific conferences hosted at African universities, of which the most recent was held in 2010 in Dakar, Senegal. EBASI cooperates with the ICTP to promote training and research opportunities for African scientists in collaboration with those based in Europe and the United States.

EBASI is headquartered at the ICTP in Trieste, Italy.
