= Strong gravity =

Theoretical approach to particle confinement

'Strong gravity' is a non-mainstream theoretical approach to particle confinement having both a cosmological scale and a particle scale gravity.

In the 1960s, it was taken up as an alternative to the then young QCD theory by several theorists, including Abdus Salam, who showed that the particle level gravity approach can produce confinement and asymptotic freedom while not requiring a force behavior differing from an inverse-square law, as does QCD. Sivaram published a review of this bimetric theory approach.

Although this approach has not so far led to a recognizably successful unification of strong and other forces, the modern approach of string theory is characterized by a close association between gauge forces and spacetime geometry. In some cases, string theory recognizes important duality between gravity-like and QCD-like theories, most notably the AdS/QCD correspondence.

The concept of strong gravity follows from applying the potential gravitational energy to the term of heat in the equation of the first law of thermodynamics ($E = Q + W$), where the total energy is mass-energy and the work is also the kinetic energy: $mc^2 = kT + E_K$ , becomes $mc^2 = \frac{Gm_sm}{r} + E_K$
