= Milton Dean Slaughter =

American physicist and professor

- Born: New Orleans, Louisiana, U.S.
- Education: University of New Orleans (UNO) (Ph.D. 1974); Louisiana State University in New Orleans (B.S. 1971) (Now known as UNO)
- Known for: Elementary particles and quantum field theory non-perturbative elementary particle and nuclear physics, STEM education for underrepresented minorities and women detonation theory and applications shock wave and dimensional analysis physics
- Awards: Nomination for the LANL Distinguished Performance Award; Fellow, American Physical Society; Fellow, American Association for the Advancement of Science
- Scientific career
- Fields: Science, technology, engineering, mathematics education (STEM); quantum field theory and elementary particles; nuclear physics; and detonation theory and applications
- Workplaces: University of Maryland, College Park; Los Alamos National Laboratory (LANL) of the University of California; University of New Orleans; Florida International University
- Doctoral advisors: (PostDoctoral); Prof. Sadao Oneda (University of Maryland, College Park); Richard Slansky (Los Alamos National Laboratory)

Milton Dean Slaughter is an American theoretical and phenomenological physicist and affiliate professor of physics at Florida International University. Slaughter was a visiting associate professor of physics in the Center for Theoretical Physics, University of Maryland, College Park while on sabbatical from Los Alamos National Laboratory (LANL) of the University of California from 1984 to 1985. He is also chair emeritus and university research professor of physics emeritus at the University of New Orleans (UNO). Prior to joining UNO as chair of the physics department: He was a postdoctoral fellow in the LANL Theoretical Division Elementary Particles and Field Theory Group (T-8); LANL Theoretical Division Detonation Theory and Applications Group (T-14) staff physicist; LANL Theoretical Division affirmative action representative and staff physicist; LANL assistant theoretical division leader for administration and staff physicist (T-DO); LANL Nuclear and Particle Physics Group staff physicist—Medium Energy Physics Division (MP-4); and LANL Historically Black Colleges and Universities (HBCU) project manager (laboratory-wide).

Before coming to LANL, Slaughter was the first African-American postdoc at the Center for Theoretical Physics, University of Maryland, College Park.

In 1988, Slaughter was appointed by Nobel Laureate Abdus Salam as a member of the First Council of the Bouchet Institute/ICTP and also a member of its executive committee.

== Early life and education ==
Slaughter was born in New Orleans, Louisiana. He was awarded a full scholarship to Columbia College, Columbia University, Class of '66. Slaughter worked as an engineering aide in the Engineering Group of the Boeing Company (1964–1965) on the S-IC first booster stage of the Saturn V rocket, manufactured at the Michoud Assembly Facility in New Orleans, Louisiana and after returning to Columbia enlisted in the USAF Security Service, where he served as an interpreter from 1966 to 1970.

Slaughter was the first African-American postdoc in the Center for Theoretical Physics, University of Maryland, College Park from 1974 to 1976, and the first African-American postdoc in the Elementary Particles and Field Theory Group of the Theoretical Division of Los Alamos National Laboratory from 1976 to 1977.

== Career ==
Slaughter's career includes more than twenty-two years of administrative service, refereed articles in top-rated journals, refereed proceedings, seven book chapters, and more than fifty invited national and international presentations.

These activities were of a multi-disciplinary nature involving research in nuclear physics, particle physics, medium-energy physics, detonation theory and applications, computational physics, and education with a special emphasis on issues involving underrepresented minorities, women, and the disadvantaged.

Slaughter's career in research, teaching, administrative, and service interests have been wide-ranging and include theoretical and phenomenological nuclear and particle physics, intense field quantum optics, shock wave physics, nanotechnology, computational science, biophysics, and their applications to "real-world" problems of interest and extend to developing innovative and effective programs in STEM.

Helping to develop STEM–associated disciplines (where societal considerations are often paramount) have always been important to him.

Slaughter has also presented international talks on how one may perhaps understand from a quantum point of view the interaction of ultra-high intensity laser pulses with biological and environmental physical systems at the nanoscale.

He has also served as a consultant, session chair, moderator, workshop and conference organizer, course lecturer, and panelist for many national and international activities in addition to being the recipient of numerous awards from the National Science Foundation and the Louisiana Board of Regents.

=== Los Alamos National Laboratory ===
At Los Alamos National Laboratory, Slaughter held the positions of staff physicist in detonation theory (1977–1981), affirmative action representative for the LANL Theoretical Division (1978–1984), staff physicist in the LANL Nuclear and Particle Physics Group of the Medium Energy Physics Division (1987–1989), and was a member of the Advanced Hadron Facility Beam Energy Group and the Applications Group of the Theoretical Division. He was the first African-American assistant theoretical division leader for administration (1981–1987), and laboratory-wide project manager for the LANL, Historically Black Colleges and Universities project manager (1983–1986). He was nominated for the LANL Distinguished Performance Award.

Representing Los Alamos National Laboratory as HBCU project manager and reporting to LANL's associate director for physics and mathematics (Warren F. Miller, Jr.), and under the auspices of Presidential Executive Order 12320, Slaughter negotiated with Department of Energy (DOE) Forrestal Headquarters, DOE Germantown, DOE Albuquerque Field Office, and DOE Los Alamos Area Office personnel for funding of HBCU programmatic activities, created the Laboratory administrative and managerial infrastructure necessary to support a program whose focus was external aid to HBCUs and whose funding was provided directly from DOE and organized the first national laboratory conference that brought representatives of over 30 HBCU schools to Los Alamos to confer with Laboratory scientific personnel on research initiatives in all areas of physics, chemistry, and mathematics.

Slaughter's conference led to direct DOE funding via subcontract for equipment and personnel at several HBCUs (Alabama A&M University, Howard University, and Southern University, Baton Rouge), the establishment of a summer internship program for HBCU students first conducted at Los Alamos in 1985, and the inception of several collaborations between Los Alamos National Laboratory scientists and HBCU professors.

=== University of New Orleans ===
In 1989, Slaughter was appointed professor (with tenure), chair and department head (1989-1999) of the Department of Physics of the University of New Orleans, (formerly known as Louisiana State University in New Orleans).

He served as chair and member of the American Physical Society Committee on Minorities in Physics (1989–1991) and was elected general member-at-large and executive committee member and Officer of the American Physical Society Forum on Education (1995–1996 term).

Slaughter was a recipient of a National Science Foundation five year continuing grant entitled: Research on an Algebraic, Nonperturbative Approach to Hadrons and Glueballs, Award Number: 9012374; NSF Organization: PHY, Start Date:02/01/1991; Award Amount:$224,000.00.

Slaughter was co-principal investigator of the National Science Foundation grant entitled A Workshop for the American Physical Society's Corporate Sponsored Scholarships for Minority Undergraduate Students Who Major in Physics, $30,000, grant number HRD-92 53144, Summer of 1992. With Co-Principal Investigators, Dr. Anthony M. Johnson then Distinguished Professor of Physics and chair, New Jersey Institute of Technology and Dr. Brian Schwartz, then American Physical Society Associate Executive Secretary and Professor of Physics, Brooklyn College. sponsored by the National Science Foundation and hosted by Hampton University and conducted at the Thomas Jefferson National Accelerator Facility.

He was appointed as a Charter Fellow of the National Society of Black Physicists in 1991, and elected as a Fellow of the American Physical Society in 1999 with the citation "For creating effective programs that attract and educate minority and female physics students and involve historically black colleges and universities in forefront research".

In 1992, Slaughter and a colleague at Xavier University of Louisiana received a National Science Foundation cooperative agreement to establish the Research Careers for Minority Scholars Graduate Dual Degree Program. The program, which ran from 1992 to 1999, supported Xavier undergraduates in pursuing dual degrees, a B.S. from Xavier University of Louisiana, and an M.S. from the University of New Orleans, in fields including computer science, engineering, mathematics, and physics. The program preceded the Louis Stokes Alliance for Minority Participation program in Louisiana, for which Slaughter served as a Phase One co-principal investigator and associate director.

Slaughter was the initiating developer of the state-wide Louis Stokes Alliance for Minority Participation (LSAMP) program in Louisiana and brought in three Co-Principal Investigators and served as its associate director between 1995 and 2000. Five year state-wide continuing Cooperative Agreement (NSF No. HRD-9550765) was funded at $5,000,000 (NSF) and $2,500,000 of matching funds from the Louisiana Board of Regents. In addition, at UNO, Slaughter also designed and directed the "Next Step" LSAMP program component designed to increase the probability that underrepresented minority students who majored in STEM fields ultimately succeed in obtaining the Bachelor of Science degree. The Next Step Program produced more than 100 graduates.

=== Florida International University ===
In 2006, after Hurricane Katrina devastated New Orleans, Slaughter became professor emeritus and department head and chair emeritus of the University of New Orleans and visiting (affiliate research) professor of physics of the Florida International University in Miami, Florida.

Slaughter is currently affiliate professor of physics, Department of Physics, Florida International University.

A recent short article, "Reflections in Diversity: Increasing Minority Participation in University STEM Programs" by Slaughter for the Optical Society of America demonstrates his immense enjoyment working with federal, state, and local agencies, international agencies, corporations, and foundations to increase the number of female and underrepresented minorities in science, technology, engineering, and mathematics.

In April 2019, Slaughter developed a much longer, detailed ″White Paper″ entitled "Status of Underrepresented Minorities in Science, Technology, Engineering, and Mathematics (STEM)", which included a program solution outline for a university organizational unit (UOU).

Slaughter is currently chair of the Edward Bouchet Abdus Salam Institute (EBASI) of the Abdus Salam International Centre for Theoretical Physics (ICTP) located in Trieste, Italy, initiated the creation of a memorandum of understanding between ICTP and EBASI, and garnered workshop funds from NSF to support EBASI scientific and technological activities in South Africa.

He was a member of the International Organizing Committee, US-Africa Workshop on Nanosciences and received an invitation as an international expert by the International Atomic Energy Agency (IAEA) to serve on a nuclear science education and accelerator training enhancement panel.

In 2014, he was elected to the rank of Fellow of the American Association for the Advancement of Science (AAAS) and honored for "contributions to non-perturbative elementary particle and nuclear physics and for the creation of effective educational programs involving minority and female STEM students".

In December, 2014, Slaughter was named a STEM Founding Fellow of the STEM Transformation Institute at Florida International University. ·

August, 2020, Niels Bohr Library & Archives, American Institute of Physics, College Park, MD USA, Interview of Milton Slaughter, https://www.aip.org/history-programs/niels-bohr-library/oral-histories

== International activities ==
- Founding council member and chair of the EBASI executive board, International Centre on Theoretical Physics (ICTP), Trieste, Italy.
- Invited speaker to professional conferences worldwide, including events in China, Ghana, Egypt, Benin, South Africa, England, Italy, Japan, and others.
- International expert, nuclear science education and accelerator training, International Atomic Energy Agency.
- Memorandum of Understanding, signed 11 February 2009 by ICTP Director K.R. Sreenivasan and Slaughter (as EBASI Chair) formalizing joint synergistic cooperation in scientific and technical collaborations among physical scientists, mathematicians, engineers, and technologists from America and Europe and their counterparts from developing countries, especially Africa.

== Personal life ==
He is married to Hazel Nicholas, who has a B.A. in special education from Dillard University. They have three adult children.

== See also ==
- Optical Society of America
- American Physical Society
- University of Maryland, College Park
- American Association for the Advancement of Science
- Florida International University

== Selected publications ==
- Slaughter, Milton Dean (2019-07-29). "Radiative decays and the SU(6) Lie algebra". International Journal of Modern Physics A. 34 (21). World Scientific Pub Co Pte Lt: 1950108–1950528. arXiv:1902.00853. Bibcode:2019IJMPA..3450108S. doi:10.1142/s0217751x19501082. ISSN 0217-751X. S2CID 119459468.
- Milton Dean Slaughter (5 December 2014). "Increasing Minority Participation in University STEM Programs". Optics & Photonics News.
- Slaughter, Milton Dean (2011-10-20). "Magnetic moments of the ground-state J^{P}=3/2^{+} baryon decuplet". Physical Review D. 84 (7). American Physical Society (APS): 071303(R). arXiv:1107.2838. doi:10.1103/physrevd.84.071303. ISSN 1550-7998. S2CID 117036659.
- Slaughter, Milton Dean (2010-07-28). "Ω^{−},Ξ^{*^{−}},Σ^{*^{−}}, and Δ^{−} decuplet baryon magnetic moments". Physical Review C. 82 (1) 015208. American Physical Society (APS). arXiv:0911.4756. doi:10.1103/physrevc.82.015208. ISSN 0556-2813.
- Slaughter, Milton Dean (2009-09-25). "γNΔ form factors and Wigner rotations". Physical Review C. 80 (3) 038201. arXiv:0810.4958. Bibcode:2009PhRvC..80c8201S. doi:10.1103/physrevc.80.038201. ISSN 0556-2813. S2CID 118515212.
- Slaughter, M (2002-05-20). "The N–Δ weak axial-vector form factor C^{A}_{5}(0)". Nuclear Physics A. 703 (1–2): 295–305. arXiv:hep-ph/9903208. doi:10.1016/s0375-9474(01)01333-1. ISSN 0375-9474. S2CID 119096102.
- Slaughter, Milton Dean; Oneda, S. (1987-10-12). "Theoretical limit on ι→ργ and constraints on glueball–qq¯-meson couplings with the pion and the isovector photon". Physical Review Letters. 59 (15). American Physical Society (APS): 1641–1644. doi:10.1103/physrevlett.59.1641. ISSN 0031-9007. PMID 10035291.
- Slaughter, Milton Dean (1995-08-20). "The Branching Ratio BR(Ω^{−}→Ξ^{0}+e^{−}+ν_{e}): an Algebraic Approach". Modern Physics Letters A. 10 (25). World Scientific Pub Co Pte Lt: 1865–1870. doi:10.1142/s0217732395002015. ISSN 0217-7323.
- Slaughter, Milton D. (1994-06-01). "ResonantP_{33} S_{1^{+}}(q^{2})^{(3/2)} electroproduction multipole amplitude and the ΔNγ scalar form factor G_{C}(q^{2})". Physical Review C. 49 (6). American Physical Society (APS): R2894–R2897. doi:10.1103/physrevc.49.r2894. ISSN 0556-2813. PMID 9969565.
- Slaughter, Milton Dean (1993-11-10). "A Calculation of the Magnetic Moment of the Δ^{++}". Modern Physics Letters A. 08 (34). World Scientific Pub Co Pte Lt: 3283–3290. Bibcode:1993MPLA....8.3283S. doi:10.1142/s021773239300221x. ISSN 0217-7323.
- Slaughter, Milton D.; Oneda, S. (1987-02-01). "The vector glueball: An algebraic approach". Physical Review D. 35 (3). American Physical Society (APS): 992–996. Bibcode:1987PhRvD..35..992S. doi:10.1103/physrevd.35.992. ISSN 0556-2821. PMID 9957745.
- Yasuè, M.; Oneda, S.; Slaughter, Milton (1984). "Charge commutation relations, asymptotic SU(2)_{L} symmetry, and the mass of the second Z boson in electroweak gauge theories". Physical Review D. 30 (1). American Physical Society (APS): 174–180. Bibcode:1984PhRvD..30..174Y. doi:10.1103/physrevd.30.174. ISSN 0556-2821.
- A Numerical and Theoretical Analysis of Some Spherically Symmetric Containment Vessel Problems, Los Alamos Scientific Laboratory Report LA-8327-MS (1980), M. D. Slaughter.
- Interaction of Explosive-Driven Air Shocks with Water and Plexiglas, Los Alamos Scientific Laboratory Report LA-7454 (1978), Milton Dean Slaughter, B. W. Olinger, James D. Kershner, and Charles L. Mader.
- Slaughter, Milton D.; Oneda, S. (1977-08-08). "Intermultiplet Mixing of the Vector Mesons in a Nonperturbative Approach to Broken SU(4)". Physical Review Letters. 39 (6). American Physical Society (APS): 309–312. Bibcode:1977PhRvL..39..309S. doi:10.1103/physrevlett.39.309. ISSN 0031-9007.
- Scattering Amplitudes for Inverse Bremsstrahlung and Pair Production in a Laser Pulse, Physical Review D. American Physical Society (APS). 11 (6): 1708–1710. https://doi.org/10.1103/PhysRevD.11.1708(1975), M. D. Slaughter and J.E Murphy.
- Slaughter, Milton D. (1975-03-15). "Electron-laser pulse scattering". Physical Review D. 11 (6). American Physical Society (APS): 1639–1648. Bibcode:1975PhRvD..11.1639S. doi:10.1103/physrevd.11.1639. ISSN 0556-2821.
