= Paul Taunton Matthews =

British scientist (1919–1987)

- Born: 19 November 1919; Erode, British India (present-day Tamil Nadu, India)
- Died: 26 February 1987 (aged 67); Cambridge, UK
- Education: Clare College, Cambridge
- Awards: Order of the British Empire; Fellow of the Royal Society; Adams Prize (1958); Rutherford Medal and Prize (1978)
- Scientific career
- Fields: Theoretical Physics
- Workplaces: Imperial College London; University of Bath; Science and Engineering Research Council
- Doctoral advisor: Nicholas Kemmer
- Doctoral students: Faheem Hussain; Christopher Isham; Ghulam Murtaza
- Other notable students: Abdus Salam; Stanley Mandelstam; John Stewart Bell; Daniel Afedzi Akyeampong

Paul Taunton Matthews CBE FRS (19 November 1919 – 26 February 1987) was a British theoretical physicist.

== Biography ==
Matthews was born in Erode in British India, and was educated at Mill Hill School and Clare College, Cambridge, where he was awarded MA and PhD degrees. He was awarded the Adams Prize in 1958, elected to the Royal Society in 1963, and awarded the Rutherford Medal and Prize in 1978. He became head of the Physics Department of Imperial College, London and later vice chancellor of the University of Bath. He was also awarded an Honorary Degree (Doctor of Science) by the University of Bath in 1983. He was also chairman of the Nuclear Physics Board of the Science Research Council.

He was close friend and mentor of the Abdus Salam, and of Faheem Hussain.

He died in Cambridge from injuries sustained in a cycling accident.

Academic offices
Preceded by Leonard Rotherham	Vice-Chancellor of the University of Bath; 1976–1983	Succeeded by John Rodney Quayle
