= Abdus Salam =

Pakistani theoretical physicist (1926–1996)

Abdus Salam NI SPk
- عبدالسلام
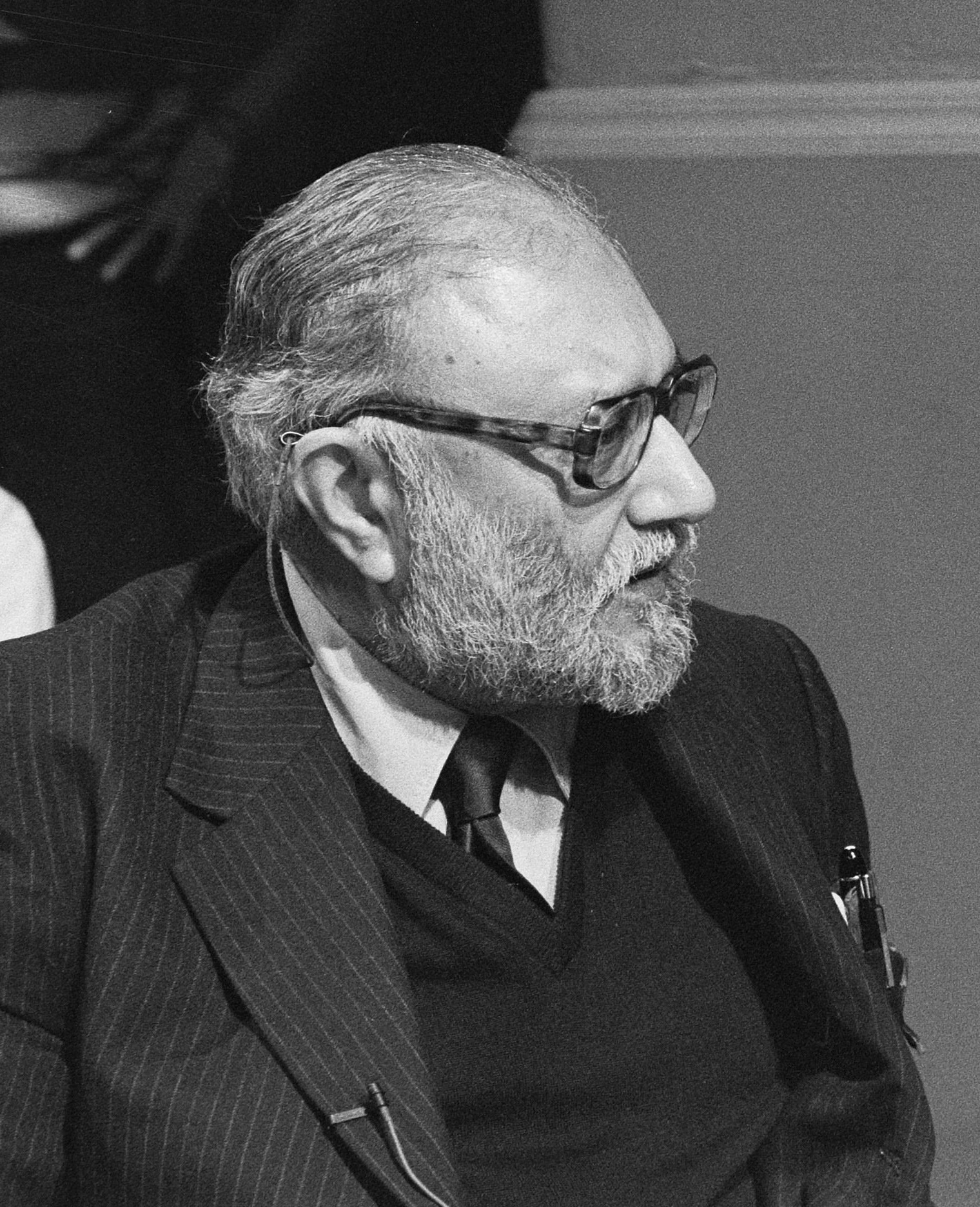
- Salam in 1987
- Born: 29 January 1926; Jhang, Punjab Province, British India (present day Punjab, Pakistan) (Note: Salam’s birth certificate lists his birthplace as Jhang. Though certain modern sources note that he was actually born in his maternal village of Santokdas in Sahiwal with his mother shifting back to Jhang, where his father was working as a teacher, shortly after his birth.)
- Died: 21 November 1996 (aged 70); Oxford, England
- Education: Government College University (BA); University of the Punjab (MA); St John's College, Cambridge (PhD)
- Known for: Electroweak theory; Goldstone boson; Grand Unified Theory; Higgs mechanism; Magnetic photon; Neutral current; Pati–Salam model; Quantum mechanics; Pakistan atomic research program; Pakistan space program; Preon; Standard Model; Strong gravity; Superfield; W and Z bosons; Effective action
- Spouse: Amtul Hafeez Begum (m. 1949–1996) Louise Johnson (m. 1968–1996)
- Children: 6
- Awards: Smith's Prize (1950); Adams Prize (1958); Sitara-e-Pakistan (1959); Hughes Medal (1964); Atoms for Peace Prize (1968); Royal Medal (1978); Matteucci Medal (1978); Nobel Prize in Physics (1979); Nishan-e-Imtiaz (1979); Lomonosov Gold Medal (1983); Copley Medal (1990)
- Scientific career
- Fields: Theoretical physics
- Workplaces: PAEC; SUPARCO; PINSTECH; Punjab University; Imperial College London; Government College University; University of Cambridge; ICTP; COMSATS; TWAS; Columbia University; University of Karachi; University of Chicago; University of Houston; Edward Bouchet Abdus Salam Institute
- Thesis: Developments in quantum theory of fields (1952)
- Doctoral advisor: Nicholas Kemmer
- Other academic advisors: Paul Matthews Anilendra Ganguly
- Doctoral students: Qaisar Shafi; Michael Duff; Daniel Afedzi Akyeampong; Ali Chamseddine; Robert Delbourgo; Walter Gilbert; John Moffat; Yuval Ne'eman; John Polkinghorne; Ray Streater; Riazuddin; Fayyazuddin; Masud Ahmad; Partha Ghose; Kamaluddin Ahmed; John Taylor; Ghulam Murtaza; Christopher Isham; Munir Ahmad Rashid; Peter West
- Other notable students: Jonathan Ashmore; Faheem Hussain; Pervez Hoodbhoy; Abdul Hameed Nayyar; Ghulam Dastagir Alam

Signature
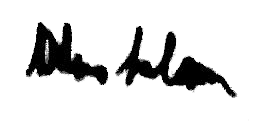

Mohammad Abdus Salam (Note: Punjabi: محمد عبدالسلام, pronounced [əbdʊs səlaːm]) (/sæˈlæm/; 29 January 1926 – 21 November 1996) was a Pakistani theoretical physicist and Nobel laureate. He shared the 1979 Nobel Prize in Physics with Steven Weinberg and Sheldon Glashow "for their contributions to the theory of the unified weak and electromagnetic interaction between elementary particles, including, inter alia, the prediction of the weak neutral current". He was the first Pakistani, and second person from any Muslim country (after Anwar Sadat of Egypt) to win a Nobel Prize.

Salam was scientific advisor to the Ministry of Science and Technology in Pakistan from 1960 to 1974, a position from which he played a major and influential role in the development of the country's science infrastructure. Salam contributed to numerous developments in theoretical and particle physics in Pakistan. He was the founding director of the Space and Upper Atmosphere Research Commission (SUPARCO). For this, he is viewed as the "scientific father" of this program. In 1974, Abdus Salam departed from his country in protest after the Parliament of Pakistan unanimously passed a parliamentary bill declaring members of the Ahmadiyya Muslim community, to which Salam belonged, non-Muslim.

Salam's notable achievements include the Pati–Salam model, a Grand Unified Theory he proposed along with Jogesh Pati in 1974, magnetic photon, vector meson, work on supersymmetry and most importantly, electroweak theory, for which he was awarded the Nobel Prize. Salam made a major contribution at Imperial College London. Salam made important contributions to the modern theory on neutrinos, as well as the work on modernising quantum mechanics. As a teacher and science promoter, Salam is remembered as a founder and scientific father of theoretical physics in Pakistan during his term as the chief scientific advisor to the president. Salam heavily contributed to the rise of Pakistani physics within the global physics community.

== Biography ==
=== Youth and education ===
Abdus Salam was born on 29 January 1926 in Jhang in the Punjab Province of British India (present day in Pakistan) into a Punjabi family professing Ahmadiyya. He belonged to the Muslim Rajput community, his son Ahmad Salam later recounted that he would tell him stories of Rajput cultural history "of which he was very proud". Jagjit Singh, in his biography of Salam, says that his family traditionally traced its genealogy back to a Rajput prince named Buddahn who converted to Islam at the hands of a Sufi preacher and later founded the city of Jhang around the year 1160. Salam was the son of Chaudhary Muhammad Hussain, a school teacher of Jhang and Hajirah who belonged to Faizullah Chak near Batala.

The name Choudhary Muhammad Hussain gave his son was Abd al-Salam which means "Servant of God". Abd means servant and Salam is one of the 99 names of God in the Qur'an. In English, his name is usually transliterated as Abdus Salam, which should be understood as a single given name. His father followed the custom of not giving a surname. Later in his life he added Mohammad to his name.

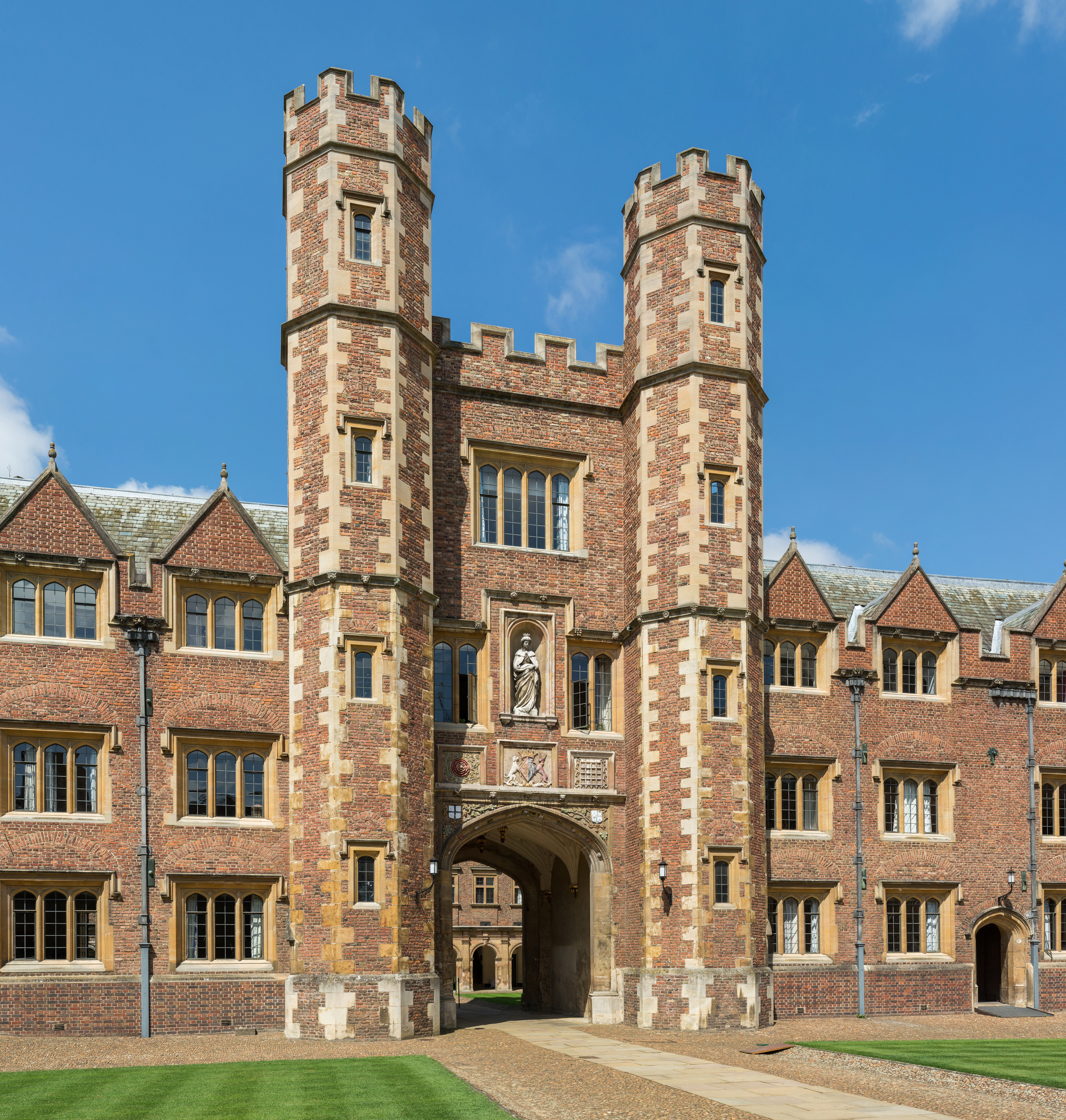
St John's College, Cambridge, where Salam studied.

Salam established an early reputation in Punjab for outstanding academic performance. In 1940, at age 14, he scored the highest marks ever recorded for the entrance examination of the Punjab University, earning a full scholarship to the Government College of Lahore. Instead of moving to Lahore immediately, he remained in Jhang and studied for two years at Government Intermediate College. In 1942, he passed his FA examinations with the highest scores in the province.

In 1942, Salam moved to Lahore to study at Government College. As a fourth-year student, he published an elegant solution for a mathematical problem originally studied by Srinivasa Ramanujan. In 1944, his mathematics exam results set a new Punjab record. Salam also excelled in Urdu and English literature, which could have led him to pursue further studies in English. However, on the recommendation of a mentor, he chose to continue with an M.A. in mathematics.

At his father's urging, Salam attempted to enter the Indian Civil Service (ICS), considered the most prestigious career path for young graduates. He applied to the Indian Railways but was rejected after failing the medical optical tests; examiners also ruled that he was too young to qualify. Salam remained in Lahore, completing his M.A. in mathematics at Government College in 1946 with record marks.

That same year, he was awarded a scholarship to St John's College, Cambridge, where he enrolled in the undergraduate Mathematical Tripos and graduated in 1949 with a Double First-Class Honours in Mathematics and Physics. Although his M.A. from Lahore would have qualified him to proceed directly to research, he still intended at that stage to pursue the ICS, and was advised to obtain a Cambridge mathematics degree first. In 1950, he received the Smith's Prize from Cambridge University for the most outstanding pre-doctoral contribution to Physics. After finishing his degrees, Fred Hoyle advised Salam to spend another year in the Cavendish Laboratory to do research in experimental physics, but Salam had no patience for carrying out experiments in the laboratory. Salam returned to Pakistan and renewed his scholarship before he returned to the United Kingdom to do his doctorate.

While at Cavendish, Salam entered a Ph.D program. His doctoral thesis titled "Developments in quantum theory of fields" contained comprehensive and fundamental work in quantum electrodynamics. By the time it was published in 1951, it had already gained him an international reputation and the Adams Prize. During his doctoral studies, his mentors challenged him to solve within one year an intractable problem which had defied such great minds as Paul Dirac and Richard Feynman. Within six months, Salam had found a solution for the renormalization of meson theory. Salam had attracted the attention of Hans Bethe, J. Robert Oppenheimer and Dirac.

=== Academic career ===
After receiving his doctorate in 1951, Salam returned to Lahore at the Government College University as a professor of mathematics, where he remained till 1954. In 1952, he was appointed professor and chair of the Department of Mathematics at the neighbouring University of the Punjab. In the latter capacity, Salam sought to update the university curriculum, introducing a course in quantum mechanics. He began to supervise the education of students who were particularly influenced by him. As a result, Riazuddin remained the only student of Salam who had the privilege to study under Salam at the undergraduate and post-graduate level in Lahore, and post-doctoral level in Cambridge University. In 1953, Salam was unable to establish a research institute in Lahore, as he faced strong opposition from his peers. Salam went back to Cambridge and joined St John's College. During 1957, his tenure at Imperial College, London started. As time passed, this department became one of the prestigious research departments that included well known physicists such as Steven Weinberg, Tom Kibble, Gerald Guralnik, C. R. Hagen, Riazuddin, and John Ward.

At Cambridge and Imperial College he formed a group of theoretical physicists, the majority of whom were his Pakistani students. At age 33, Salam became one of the youngest persons to be elected a Fellow of the Royal Society (FRS) in 1959. Salam took a fellowship at Princeton University in 1959, where he met with J. Robert Oppenheimer and to whom he presented his research work on neutrinos. Oppenheimer and Salam discussed the foundation of electrodynamics, problems and their solution. His dedicated personal assistant was Jean Bouckley. In 1980, Salam became a foreign fellow of the Bangladesh Academy of Sciences.

=== Scientific career ===
Salam made an important and significant contribution in Particle physics. In his early career in Pakistan, Salam was greatly interested in mathematical series and their relation to physics. Salam had played an influential role in the advancement of nuclear physics, but he maintained and dedicated himself to mathematics and theoretical physics and focused Pakistan to do more research in theoretical physics. However, he regarded nuclear physics (nuclear fission and nuclear power) as a non-pioneering part of physics as it had already "happened". Even in Pakistan, Salam was the leading driving force in theoretical physics, with many scientists he continued to influence and encourage to keep their work on theoretical physics.

Salam had a prolific research career in theoretical and high-energy physics. Salam had worked on the neutrino with his chiral symmetry. Salam later passed his work to Riazuddin, who made pioneering contributions in neutrinos. In 1962, Salam published his theoretical work on the vector meson. In 1961, Salam began to work with John Clive Ward on symmetries and electroweak unification. Together with Weinberg and Sheldon Glashow, Salam formulated the mathematical concept of their work.

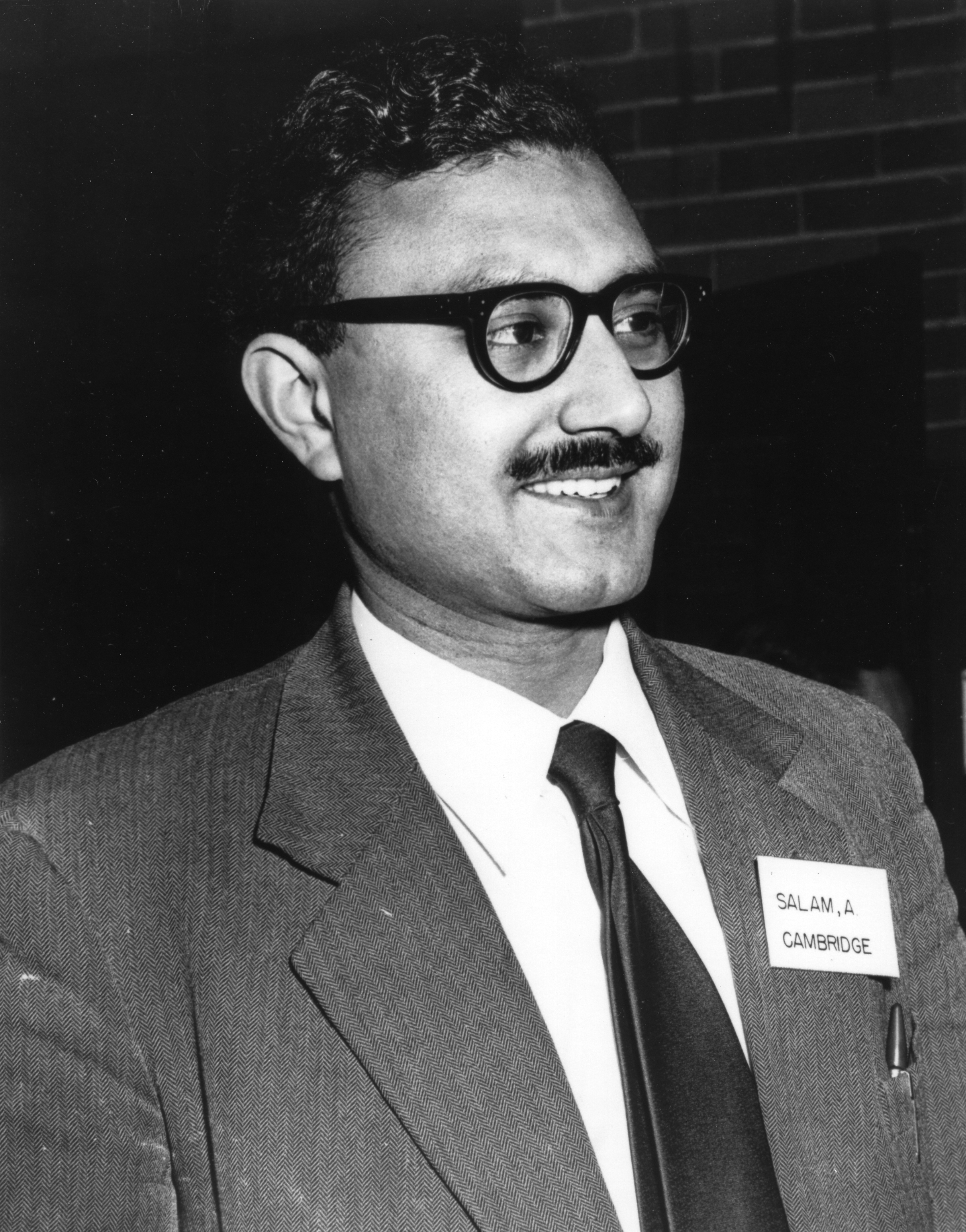
Abdus Salam at the Fifth International Conference on High Energy Physics (ICHEP), 1955, Rochester

In 1966, Salam carried out work on the magnetic monopole.

In 1972, Salam began to work with Indian-American theoretical physicist Jogesh Pati. This led to the development of Pati–Salam model in particle physics.

Salam, Glashow, and Weinberg were awarded the Nobel Prize in Physics in 1979. The Nobel Prize Foundation paid tribute to the scientists and issued a statement saying: "For their contributions to the theory of the unified weak and electromagnetic interaction between elementary particles, including, inter alia, the prediction of the weak neutral current". Salam took the Nobel Prize medal to the house of his former professor, Anilendra Ganguly, who taught him at the Sanatan Dharma College in Lahore, and placed the medal around his neck, stating "Mr Anilendra Ganguly this medal is a result of your teaching and love of mathematics that you instilled in me". Only one known official replica of the Nobel Prize Medal was ever produced by the Mint of Pakistan in 1979/80. This medal has a large test cut and damage from two to three o'clock. The replica medal was sold at auction to an unknown bidder on April 23, 2025. In the 1970s Salam continued trying to unify forces by including the strong interaction in a Grand Unified Theory.

== Government work ==
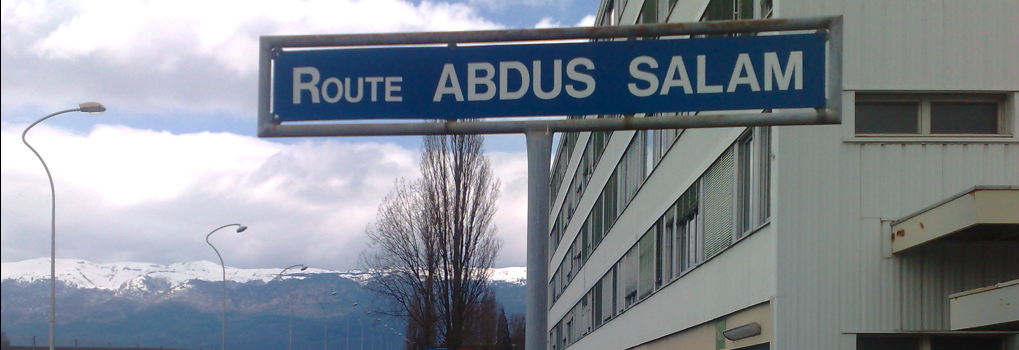
Sign on the road named after Abdus Salam in CERN, Geneva

In 1961 he approached President Khan to set up the country's first national space agency, thus on 16 September 1961 the Space and Upper Atmosphere Research Commission was established, with Salam as its first director.

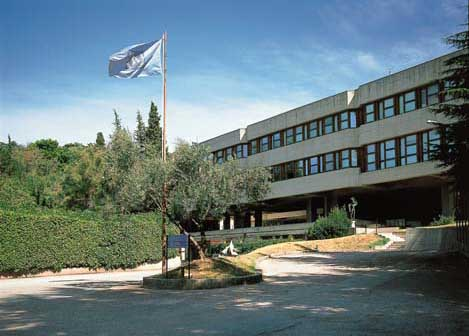
The Abdus Salam International Centre for Theoretical Physics was founded by Salam in 1964.

From the 1950s, Salam had tried establishing high-powered research institutes in Pakistan, though he was unable to do so. He moved PAEC Headquarters to a bigger building, and established research laboratories all over the country. On the direction of Salam, Ishrat Hussain Usmani set up plutonium and uranium exploration committees throughout the country. In October 1961, Salam travelled to the United States and signed a space co-operation agreement between Pakistan and US. In November 1961, the US National Aeronautics and Space Administration (NASA) started to build a space facility – Flight Test Center (FTC) – at Sonmiani, a coastal town in Balochistan Province. Salam served as its first technical director.

While in the IAEA, Salam had consulted about the establishment of the International Centre for Theoretical Physics (ICTP), a research physics institution, in Trieste, Italy. Salam obtained permission from President Ayub Khan to set up the Karachi Nuclear Power Plant.

=== Space programme ===
In early 1961, Salam approached President Khan to lay the foundations of Pakistan's first executive agency to co-ordinate space research. By executive order on 16 September 1961 the Space and Upper Atmosphere Research Commission (SUPARCO) was established with Salam founding director.

=== Nuclear weapons programme ===
Salam knew the importance of nuclear technology in Pakistan, for civilian and peaceful purposes. But, according to his biographers, Salam played an ambiguous role in Pakistan's own atomic bomb project. As late as the 1960s, Salam made an unsuccessful proposal for the establishment of a nuclear fuel reprocessing plant, but it was deferred on economic grounds by Ayub Khan. According to Rehman, Salam's influence in nuclear development was diminished as late as 1974, and he became critical of Bhutto's control over science. But Salam personally did not terminate his connection with the scientists working in the theoretical physics division at PAEC. As early as 1972–73, he had been a great advocate for the atomic bomb project, but subsequently took a stance against it after he fell out with Bhutto over the Second Amendment to the Constitution of Pakistan which declared the Ahmaddiya denomination to be non-Islamic.

In 1965, the plutonium Pakistan Atomic Research Reactor (PARR-I) went critical under Salams' leadership. In 1973, Salam proposed the idea of establishing an annual college to promote scientific activities in the country to the chairman of PAEC, Munir Khan, who accepted and fully supported the idea. This led to the establishment of the International Nathiagali Summer College on Physics and Contemporary Needs (INSC), where each year since 1976 scientists from all over the world come to Pakistan to interact with local scientists. The first annual INSC conference was held on advanced particle and nuclear physics.

In November 1971, Salam met with Zulfikar Ali Bhutto in his residence, and following Bhutto's advice, went to the United States to avoid the Indo-Pakistani War of 1971. Salam travelled to the US and returned to Pakistan with scientific literature about the Manhattan Project, and calculations involving atomic bombs. On 20 January 1972, Salam, as Science Advisor to the president of Pakistan, managed and participated in a secret meeting of nuclear scientists with former prime minister, Zulfikar Ali Bhutto, in Multan, known as the 'Multan Meeting'. At the meeting, only I. H. Usmani protested, believing that the country had neither the facilities or talent to carry out such an ambitious and technologically demanding project, whilst Salam remained quiet. Here, Bhutto entrusted Salam and appointed Munir Khan as Chairman of PAEC, and head of the atomic bomb program, as Salam had supported Khan. A few months after the meeting, Salam, Khan, and Riazuddin, met with Bhutto in his residence where the scientists briefed him about the nuclear weapons program. After the meeting, Salam established the 'Theoretical Physics Group' (TPG) in PAEC. Salam led groundbreaking work at TPG until 1974.

An office was set up for Salam in the Prime Ministers' Secretariat by order of Bhutto. Salam immediately started to motivate and invite scientists to begin work with PAEC in the development of fission weapons. They were assigned to conduct research in fast neutron calculations, hydrodynamics (how the explosion produced by a chain reaction might behave and problems of neutron diffusion. Following India's surprise nuclear test – Pokhran-I – in 1974, Muhammad Hafeez Qureshi was appointed head of the Directorate of Technical Development (DTD) in PAEC.

The DTD was set up to co-ordinate the work of the various specialised groups of scientists and engineers working on different aspects of the atomic bomb. The participants fully understood what was being discussed. Salam moved after Ahmadi were declared non-Muslims by the Pakistani Parliament. His own relations with Prime minister Bhutto fell out and turned into open hostility after the Ahmadiyya Community was declared as not-Islamic; he lodged a public and powerful protest against Bhutto regarding this issue and gave great criticism to Bhutto over his control over science. In spite of this, Salam maintained close relations with the theoretical physics division at PAEC who kept him informed about the status of the calculations needed to calculate the performance of the atomic bomb, according to Norman Dombey. After seeing Indian aggression, the Siachen conflict in Northern Pakistan, followed by India's Operation Brasstacks in Southern Pakistan, Salam again renewed his ties with senior scientists working in the atomic bomb projects, who had kept him informed about the scientific development of the program. In the 1980s, Salam personally approved many appointments and a large influx of Pakistani scientists to the associateship program at ICTP and CERN, and engaged in research in theoretical physics with his students at the ICTP.

In 2008, Indian scholar Ravi Singh noted in his book The Military Factor in Pakistan that, "in 1978, Abdus Salam with PAEC officials, paid a secret visit to China, and was instrumental in initiating industrial nuclear cooperation between the two countries." Although he had left the country, Salam did not hesitate to advise the PAEC and Theoretical and Mathematical Physics Group on important scientific matters, and kept his close association with TPG and PAEC.

== Advocacy for science ==
In 1964, Salam founded the International Centre for Theoretical Physics (ICTP), Trieste, in Italy and served as its director until 1993. In 1974, he founded the International Nathiagali Summer College (INSC) to promote science in Pakistan. The INSC is an annual meeting of scientists from all over the world who come to Pakistan and hold discussions on physics and science. Even today, the INSC holds annual meetings, and Salam's pupil Riazuddin has been its director since its start.

In 1997, the scientists at ICTP commemorated Salam and renamed ICTP as the "Abdus Salam International Centre for Theoretical Physics". Salam also founded the Third World Academy of Sciences (TWAS) and was a leading figure in the creation of a number of international centres dedicated to the advancement of science and technology.

In 1979, Salam said: Physicists believed there are four fundamental forces of nature; the gravitational force, the weak and strong nuclear force, and the electromagnetic force. Salam was a firm believer that "scientific thought is the common heritage of mankind", and that developing nations needed to help themselves, and invest in their own scientists to boost development and reduce the gap between the Global South and the Global North, thus contributing to a more peaceful world.

In 1981, Salam became a founding member of the World Cultural Council.

Although Salam left Pakistan, he did not terminate his connection to home.

== Personal life ==
Abdus Salam was a very private individual, who kept his public and personal lives quite separate. He married twice; first time to a cousin, the second time as well in accordance with Islamic law. At his death, he was survived by three daughters and a son by his first wife, and a son and daughter by his second, Professor Dame Louise Johnson, formerly Professor of molecular biophysics at Oxford University. Two of his daughters are Anisa Bushra Salam Bajwa and Aziza Rahman.

=== Religion ===
Salam was an Ahmadi Muslim, who saw his religion as a fundamental part of his scientific work. He once wrote that "the Holy Quran enjoins us to reflect on the verities of Allah's created laws of nature; however, that our generation has been privileged to glimpse a part of His design is a bounty and a grace for which I render thanks with a humble heart." During his acceptance speech for the Nobel Prize in Physics, Salam quoted verses from the Quran and stated:

"Thou seest not, in the creation of the All-merciful any imperfection, Return thy gaze, seest thou any fissure? Then Return thy gaze, again and again. Thy gaze, Comes back to thee dazzled, aweary." (67:3–4) This, in effect, is the faith of all physicists; the deeper we seek, the more is our wonder excited, the more is the dazzlement for our gaze.

In 1974, the Pakistan parliament made the Second Amendment to the Constitution of Pakistan that declared Ahmadi Muslims to be non-Muslim. In protest, Salam left Pakistan for London. After his departure, he did not completely cut his ties to Pakistan, and kept a close association with the Theoretical Physics Group as well as academic scientists from the Pakistan Atomic Energy Commission.

=== Death ===
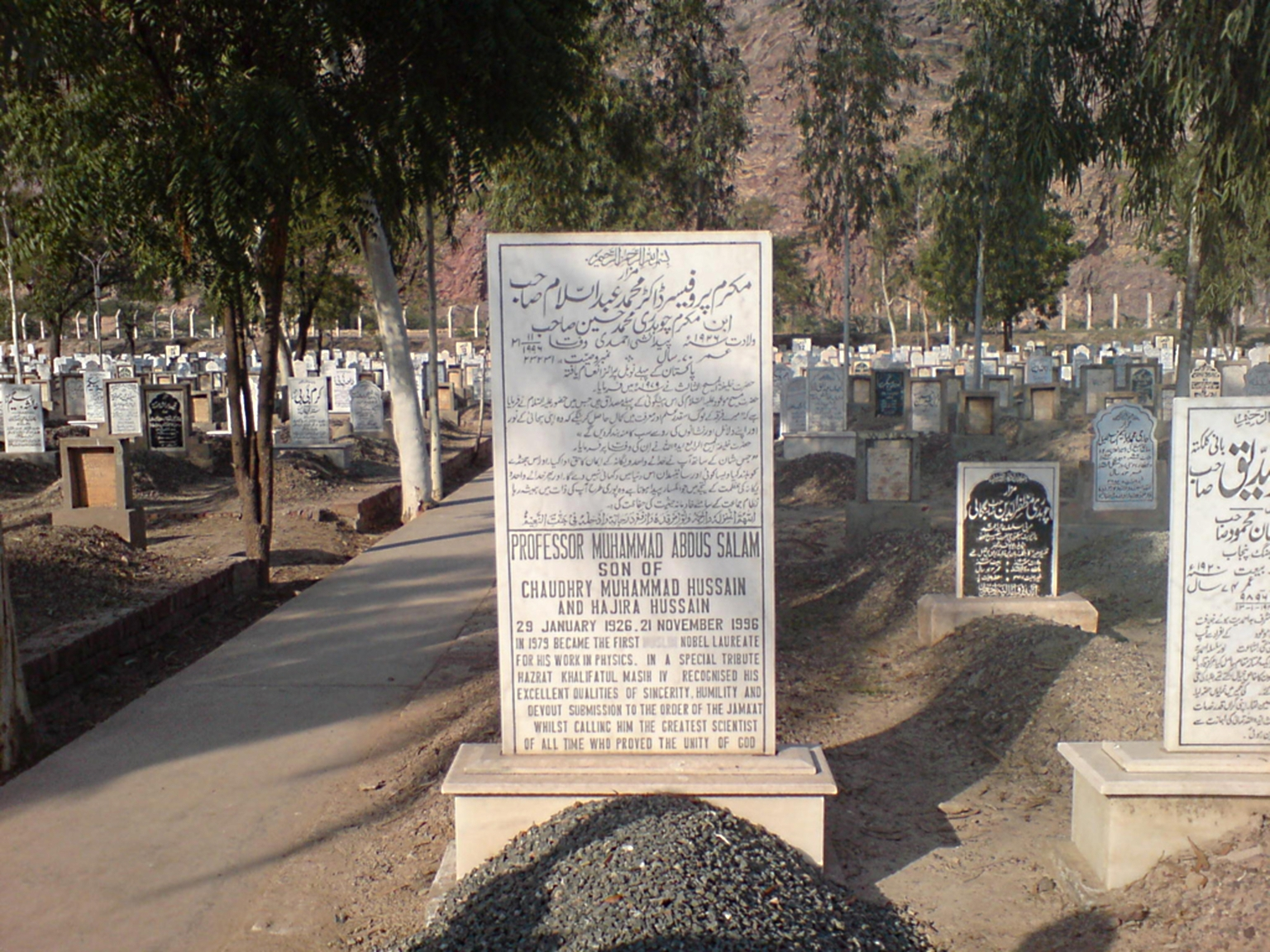
The grave of Abdus Salam at Rabwah, Pakistan with the word 'Muslim' obscured.

Abdus Salam died on 21 November 1996 at the age of 70 in Oxford, England, from progressive supranuclear palsy. His body was returned to Pakistan and kept in Darul Ziafat, where some 13,000 men and women visited to pay their last respects. Approximately 30,000 people attended his funeral prayers.

Salam was buried in Bahishti Maqbara, a cemetery established by the Ahmadiyya Community at Rabwah, Punjab, Pakistan, next to his parents' graves. The epitaph on his tomb initially read "First Muslim Nobel Laureate". The Pakistani government removed "Muslim" and left only his name on the headstone. It is the only nation to officially declare that Ahmadis are non-Muslim. The word "Muslim" was initially obscured on the orders of a local magistrate before moving to the national level. Under Ordinance XX of 1984, being an Ahmadi, he was considered a non-Muslim according to the definition provided in the Second Amendment to the Constitution of Pakistan.

=== Legacy ===
His craving for nationalism is symbolized best by his wish to be buried in his own homeland... He loved his country and its soil. We projected him as a hero, a father, and role model for our young scientists...

— Masud Ahmad, on Salam's legacy

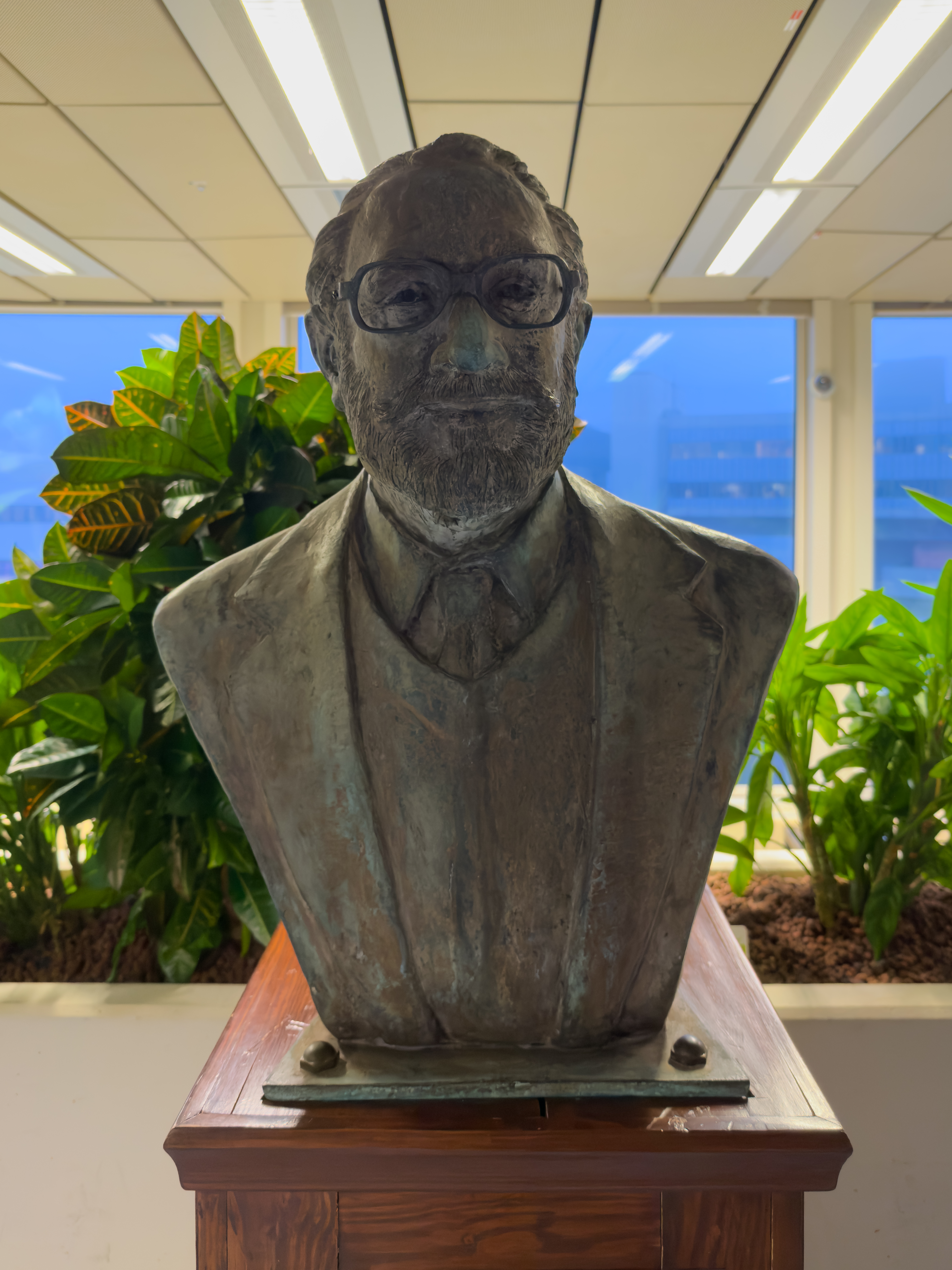
Bust at the UN Vienna International Centre

Salam's work in Pakistan has been far reaching and regarded as highly influential. He is remembered by his peers and students as the "father of Pakistan's school of Theoretical Physics" as well as Pakistan's science. Salam was a charismatic and iconic figure, a symbol among them of what they were working or researching toward in their fields. His students, fellow scientists and engineers, remembered him as brilliant teacher, and engaging researcher who would also influence others to do the same. The International Centre for Theoretical Physics established by Salam has continued to train scientists from developing countries. Salam founded the Space Research Commission of and was its first director. In 1998, the Government of Pakistan issued a commemorative stamp to honour Salam as part of its "Scientists of Pakistan" series. His alma mater, Government College Lahore, now a university, has the Abdus Salam Chair in Physics and Abdus Salam School of Mathematical Sciences named after him. The Abdus Salam Chair was also established in his honour at the Syed Babar Ali School of Science and Engineering in the Lahore University of Management Sciences. He made a significant contribution towards the 2012 success in the search for the Higgs boson.

Ghulam Murtaza, a student of Salam, wrote:

A commemorative stamp honouring Abdus Salam

[When Dr.] Salam was to deliver a lecture, the hall would be packed and although the subject was Particle Physics, his manner and eloquence was such as if he was talking about literature. When he finished his lectures, listeners would often burst into spontaneous applause and give him a standing ovation. ... [People] from all parts of the world would come to Imperial College and seek [Dr.] Salam's help. He would give a patient hearing to everyone including those who were talking nonsense. He treated everyone with respect and compassion and never belittled or offended anyone. [Dr.] Salam's strength was that he could "sift jewels from the sand".

Ishfaq Ahmad, a lifelong friend of Salam recalls:

Dr Salam was responsible for sending about 500 physicists, mathematicians and scientists from Pakistan, for PhD's to the best institutions in UK and USA.

In August 1996 another lifelong friend, Munir Ahmad Khan, met Salam in Oxford. Khan, who headed the nuclear weapons and nuclear energy programmes, said:

My last meeting with Abdus Salam was only three months ago. His disease had taken its toll and he was unable to talk. Yet he understood what was said. I told him about the celebration held in Pakistan on his seventieth birthday. He kept staring at me. He had risen above praise. As I rose to leave he pressed my hand to express his feelings as if he wanted to thank everyone who had said kind words about him. Dr. Abdus Salam had deep love for Pakistan in spite of the fact that he was treated unfairly and indifferently by his own country. It became more and more difficult for him to come to Pakistan and this hurt him deeply. Now he has returned home finally, to rest in peace for ever in the soil that he loved so much. May be in the years to come we will rise above our prejudice and own him and give him, after his death, what we could not when he was alive

A 1997 quote by Khan was "[We] Pakistanis may choose to ignore Dr. Salam, but the world at large will always remember him"

However, Salam's legacy is often ignored in the Pakistani education system despite his achievements. According to the documentary 'Salam: The First ****** Nobel Laureate,' very few young Pakistanis have heard of him, and his name is not mentioned in Pakistani school textbooks. In 2020, a group of students belonging to the State Youth Parliament desecrated an image of Salam that was present at a college in Gujranwala, while chanting slogans against the Ahmadiyya Muslim community. This deliberate effort to stifle mention of Salam is attributed to Salam belonging to the Ahmadiyya Muslim community, who have faced state-sponsored discrimination since the 1970s.

== Documentaries on Abdus Salam ==
Salam – the film

LLC started formally researching and developing a film on the science and life of Abdus Salam in 2004, two years after the producers had conceived of the idea. A fundraising teaser was released by Kailoola Productions to coincide with Salam's birth anniversary on 29 January 2017. The post-production phase of this documentary film, pending funding, is estimated at US$150,000. The film Salam: The First ****** Nobel Laureate, directed by the Indian-American documentary filmmaker Anand Kamalakar, was announced in 2018 and released on Netflix in October 2019.

Abdus Salam

Pilgrim Films released The Dream of Symmetry in September 2011. Their press release describes it as presenting "the extraordinary figure of Abdus Salam, who not only was an outstanding scientist but also a generous humanitarian and a valuable person. His rich and busy life was an endless quest for symmetry, that he pursued in the universe of physical laws and in the world of human beings."

== Honours ==
Dr. Salam's genius was like a magic... And there was always an element of eastern mysticism in his ideas that left one wondering how to fathom his genius...

— Masud Ahmad, honoring Abdus Salam

Salam was elected to the American Academy of Arts and Sciences in 1971, the United States National Academy of Sciences in 1979, and the American Philosophical Society in 1992. While covering the media converge on Salam's tribute, The News International, referred to Salam as the "great Pakistan scientist".

In 1998, the Edward A. Bouchet-ICTP Institute was renamed as the Edward Bouchet Abdus Salam Institute. Since 2003, Government College University has the Abdus Salam School of Mathematical Sciences.

That it has taken nearly four decades for this country to honour a globally renowned scientist who was one of its own, is a sad reflection of the priorities that hold sway here... For Dr Salam was an Ahmadi, a persecuted minority in Pakistan, and his faith rather than his towering achievements was the yardstick by which he was judged.

— Dawn

In 2008, in an opinion piece, Daily Times called Salam "one of the greatest scientists Pakistan has ever produced".

In 2015, the Academy of Young Researchers and Scholars, Lahore, renamed its library as the "Abdus Salam Library". In the town of Vaughan, Ontario, Canada, near the headquarters of the Canadian branch of the Ahmadiyya Muslim Community, of which Abdus Salam was a member, the community has named a street after him, 'Abdus Salam Street', while at CERN in Geneva, Switzerland there is 'Route Salam'. Additionally, there are two annual Abdus Salam science fairs, one held in Canada and the other in the US. Each is organised as a National event for young scientists from the Ahmadiyya Muslim Community in an effort to motivate youth toward scientific endeavour.

On 6 December 2016, Pakistan's prime minister Nawaz Sharif approved the renaming of Quaid-i-Azam University's (QAU) physics centre to the Professor Abdus Salam Center for Physics. It was also announced that the Professor Abdus Salam Fellowship will be established, which will include five annual fully funded Pakistani PhD students in the field of Physics in "leading international universities".

In November 2020, English Heritage erected a blue plaque in Salam's honour in Campion Road, Putney, London, at the house that was his London home for almost 40 years.

In June 2023, Imperial College, London announced the renaming of its Imperial College Central Library as the Abdus Salam Library.

=== Awards and recognition ===
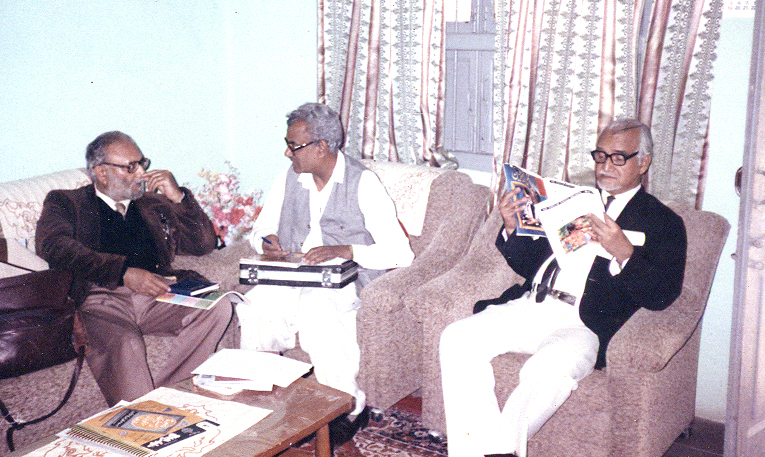
Abdus Salam with Pakistani intellectual Syed Qasim Mahmood in 1986

In 1979, Salam was awarded a third of the 1979 Nobel Prize in Physics, along with Glashow and Weinberg, For their contributions to the theory of the unified weak and electromagnetic interaction between elementary particles, including, inter alia, the prediction of the weak neutral current. Salam received high civil and science awards from all over the world. Salam is recipient of first high civil awards – Star of Pakistan. Below is the list of awards that were conferred to Salam in his lifetime.

- Nobel Prize in Physics (Stockholm, Sweden) (1979)
- Hopkins Prize (Cambridge University) for "the most outstanding contribution to Physics during 1957–1958"
- Adams Prize (Cambridge University) (1958)
- Fellow of the Royal Society (1959)
- Smith's Prize (Cambridge University) (1950)
- Sitara-e-Pakistan by the president of Pakistan for contribution to science in Pakistan (1959)
- Pride of Performance Award by the president of Pakistan (1958)
- First recipient of James Clerk Maxwell Medal and Prize (Physical Society, London) (1961)
- Hughes Medal (Royal Society, London) (1964)
- Atoms for Peace Award (Atoms for Peace Foundation) (1968)
- J. Robert Oppenheimer Memorial Prize and Medal (University of Miami) (1971)
- Guthrie Medal and Prize (1976)
- Sir Devaprasad Sarvadhikary Gold Medal (Calcutta University) (1977)
- Matteuci Medal (Accademia Nazionale dei Lincei, Rome) (1978)
- John Torrence Tate Medal (American Institute of Physics) (1978)
- Royal Medal (Royal Society, London) (1978)
- Nishan-e-Imtiaz by the president of Pakistan for outstanding performance in Scientific projects in Pakistan (1979)
- Einstein Medal (UNESCO, Paris) (1979)
- Shri R.D. Birla Award (India Physics Association) (1979)
- Order of Andrés Bello (Venezuela) (1980)
- Order of Istiqlal (Jordan) (1980)
- Order of Merit of the Italian Republic (1980)
- Josef Stefan Medal (Josef Stefan Institute, Ljublijana) (1980)
- Gold Medal for Outstanding Contributions to Physics (Czechoslovak Academy of Sciences, Prague) (1981)
- Peace Medal (Charles University, Prague) (1981)
- Doctor of Science from University of Chittagong (1981)
- Lomonosov Gold Medal (USSR Academy of Sciences) (1983)
- Premio Umberto Biancamano (Italy) (1986)
- Dayemi International Peace Award (Bangladesh) (1986)
- First Edinburgh Medal and Prize (Scotland) (1988)
- "Genoa" International Development of Peoples Prize (Italy) (1988)
- Honorary Knight Commander of the Order of the British Empire (1989)
- Catalunya International Prize (Spain) (1990)
- Copley Medal (Royal Society, London) (1990)

=== Awards named after Salam ===
The Abdus Salam Award (also called the Salam Prize) is an award established to recognise high achievements and contributions in physical and natural sciences. Salam donated the money he had won. It was created by Asghar Qadir, Riazuddin and Fayyazuddin in 1980, and it was first awarded in 1981. The winners are selected by a committee (consisted of Aghar Qadir, Fayyazuddin, and Riazuddin, and others. The Abdus Salam Medal is presented by the Third World Academy of Sciences. It was first given in 1995. The Abdus Salam Shield of Honor in Mathematics was initiated by the National Mathematical Society of Pakistan to promote and recognize quality research in Mathematics in 2015. It was awarded for the first time in 2016.

=== Contributions ===
Salam's primary focus was research on the physics of elementary particles. His particular numerous groundbreaking contributions included:

- two-component neutrino theory and the prediction of the inevitable parity violation in weak interaction;
- gauge unification of weak and electromagnetic interactions, the unified force is called the "Electroweak" force, a name given to it by Salam, and which forms the basis of the Standard Model in particle physics;
- predicted the existence of weak neutral currents, and W and Z bosons, before their experimental discovery
- symmetry properties of elementary particles; unitary symmetry;
- renormalization of meson theories;
- gravity theory and its role in particle physics; two tensor theory of gravity and strong interaction physics;
- unification of electroweak with strong nuclear forces, grand unification theory;
- related prediction of proton-decay;
- Pati–Salam model, a grand unification theory;
- Supersymmetry theory, in particular formulation of Superspace and formalism of superfields in 1974;
- the theory of supermanifolds, as a geometrical framework for understanding supersymmetry, in 1974;
- Supergeometry, the geometric basis for supersymmetry, in 1974;
- application of the Higgs mechanism to 'electroweak symmetry breaking';
- prediction of the magnetic photon in 1966;
- Salam–Shaw gauge theory in January 1954, an independent formulation of non-Abelian gauge theory developed alongside his doctoral student Ronald Shaw that preceded the identical Yang–Mills theory by almost a year, a framework Salam would later formally refer to as the "Yang–Mills–Shaw gauge theory" and which ultimately laid the indispensable structural foundation for the modern Standard Model of particle physics

== Institutes named after Abdus Salam and other named entities ==
- Abdus Salam Centre for Physics (Department of Physics), Quaid-e-Azam University, Islamabad, Pakistan
- Abdus Salam National Centre for Mathematics (ASNCM), Government College University, Lahore, Pakistan.
- Abdus Salam Chair in Physics (ASCP), Government College University, Lahore, Pakistan.
- Abdus Salam International Centre for Theoretical Physics, Trieste, Italy.
- Abdus Salam School of Mathematical Sciences, Lahore, Pakistan
- The Edward Bouchet Abdus Salam Institute (EBASI)
- Abdus Salam Library at Imperial College London

== See also ==
- Preon
- Unified field theory
- W and Z bosons

== Sources ==
- Duff, Michael (2007). Salam + 50: proceedings of the conference. London: Imperial College Press. p. 84.
- Fraser, Gordon (2008). Cosmic Anger: Abdus Salam – The First Muslim Nobel Scientist. United Kingdom: Oxford University Press. ISBN 978-0-19-920846-3.
- Ghani, Abdul (1982). "Science Advisor to the President (1960–1974)". Abdus Salam: a Nobel laureate from a Muslim country: a biographical sketch. p. 234.
- Fayyazuddin (2005). "Salam: As I know him" (PDF). NCP 5th Lectures. Islamabad, Pakistan: National Center for Physics: 19. Archived from the original (PDF) on 3 March 2016.
- Rahman, Shahid (1998). "Development of Weapons". In Rahman, Shahid (ed.). Long Road to Chagai. Islamabad, Pakistan: Printwise publication. p. 157. ISBN 969-8500-00-6.
- Ali, A; Isham, C; Kibble, T; Riazuddin (1994). Selected Papers of Abdus Salam (With Commentary). World Scientific. Bibcode:1994spas.book.....A. doi:10.1142/2265. ISBN 978-981-02-1662-7. OCLC 7348088477.
- Riazuddin (2005). "Contributions of Professor Abdus Salam as member of PAEC" (PDF). The Nucleus. 42 (1–2). Islamabad, Pakistan: Pakistan Institute of Nuclear Science and Technology: 31–34. Archived from the original (PDF) on 27 June 2014.
- Kibble, T. W. B. (1 November 1998). "Muhammad Abdus Salam, K. B. E.. 29 January 1926–21 November 1996". Biographical Memoirs of Fellows of the Royal Society. 44: 387–401. doi:10.1098/rsbm.1998.0025.

Government offices
Preceded by Salimuzzaman Siddiqui	Science Advisor to the Prime minister Secretariat; 6 March 1960 – 7 September 1974	Succeeded by Mubashir Hassan
