= Journal of Group Theory =

- Discipline: Group theory
- Language: English
- Edited by: Chris Parker

Publication details
- History: 1998-present
- Publisher: Walter de Gruyter
- Frequency: Bimonthly
- Open access: Hybrid
- Impact factor: 0.47 (2018)

Standard abbreviations
- ISO 4: J. Group Theory

Indexing
- CODEN: JGTHFQ
- ISSN: 1433-5883 (print); 1435-4446 (web)
- LCCN: sn98052119
- OCLC no.: 43493823

Links
- Journal homepage; Online archive

The Journal of Group Theory is a bimonthly peer-reviewed mathematical journal covering all aspects of group theory. It was established in 1998 and is published by Walter de Gruyter. The editor-in-chief is Chris Parker (University of Birmingham).

== Abstracting and indexing ==
The journal is abstracted and indexed in:

- Academic Search
- Scopus
- Mathematical Reviews
- ProQuest databases
- Current Contents/Physical, Chemical and Earth Sciences
- Science Citation Index
- Zentralblatt Math

Its 2018 MCQ is 0.48. According to the Journal Citation Reports, the journal has a 2018 impact factor of 0.47, and the 5-year impact factor is 0.52.
