= List of University of the Punjab people =

This is a list of notable alumni, faculty and admins of the University of the Punjab, located in Lahore, Punjab, Pakistan.

== Notable alumni ==
=== A ===
- Allama Iqbal
- Alamgir Hashmi
- Ashfaq Ahmed
- Anwer Zahidi
- Anwar Kamal Pasha
- Arif Alvi
- Ali Baqar Najafi
- Asma Jahangir
- Allama Mashriqi
- Abdus Salam
- Amir Mir
- Anwar Nasim
- Abdul Matin Khan

=== B ===
- B. R. Chopra

=== C ===
- Colin David
- Chaudry Mohammad Aslam
- Choudhary Rahmat Ali

=== D ===
- Dalip Singh Saund

=== F ===
- Fauzia Abbas
- Farooq Azam
- Farzana Raja
- Farzana Naz
- Fatima Begum (politician, born 1890)

=== G ===
- Ghulam Ahmad
- Ghulam Murtaza

=== H ===
- Hamid Mir
- Hamid Nawaz Khan
- Har Gobind Khorana
- Hassan Nisar

=== I ===
- Ibn-e-Insha
- Ihsan H. Nadiem
- Ishfaq Ahmad
- Inder Kumar Gujral

=== J ===
- Javed Hashmi
- Jagannath Azad
- Javid Husain
- Joseph R. D'Cruz

=== K ===
- Khalid Masud
- Kalsoom Nawaz Sharif

=== M ===
- Mian Muhammad Mansha
- Mehr Abdul Haq
- Musadik Malik
- Masud Ahmad
- Mirza Tahir Ahmad
- Mazhar Mahmood Qurashi
- Moeenuddin Ahmad Qureshi
- Mohan Rakesh (1925-1972), playwright
- Mumtaz Hamid Rao
- Muneer Ahmad Rashid
- Mohsin Razi
- Muhammad Sharif
- Mushtaq Ahmad
- Mohammad Ahsan
- Muneer Ahmed Badini
- Muhammad Munawwar Mirza
- Muhammad Rafiq Tarar
- Muzaffar Iqbal
- Mujahid Kamran
- Mohammed Rafique Mughal

=== N ===
- Niaz Ahmad Akhtar
- Nighat Dad
- Noor Muhammad
- Noor Muhammad Butt

=== R ===
- Rafiuddin Hashmi
- Raj Mahindra
- Ralph Randles Stewart
- Rahman Syed

=== S ===
- Shahbaz Malik
- Sartaj Aziz
- Satish Dhawan
- Syed Zakir Hussain Shah
- Siddiq Khan Kanju
- Saif-ur-Rehman Khan
- Salim Mehmud
- Sanaullah Amritsari
- Shaista Khilji
- Safdar Kiyani
- Sir Shanti Swarup Bhatnagar

=== T ===
- Tahir-ul-Qadari

=== W ===
- Waqar Jaffry
- Wasiullah Khan

=== Y ===
- Yash Pal
- Yusril Ihza Mahendra
- Yousaf Raza Gillani

=== Z ===
- Zubair Ali Zai
- Zafar Moeen Nasir

== Noted PU faculty ==
(Some of the alumni listed above also served in the University of the Punjab faculty, so their names are not repeated here)

- Anwaar Ahmad
- Anna Molka Ahmed
- GF Bruce
- Mian Shah Din
- Oliver Elton
- Kanwal Ameen
- E.M. Forster
- Omar Asghar Khan
- Gottlieb Wilhelm Leitner
- Ishtiaq Hussain Qureshi
- Sir Ganga Ram
- Alfred Cooper Woolner

== See also ==
- List of people from Lahore
- Higher education in Pakistan
- Higher Education Commission of Pakistan
