= Lists of schools in Pakistan =

This is a list of educational institutions in Pakistan.

== By level ==
- Schools
- Madrassas
- Colleges
- Universities
- Research institutes
- Special education institutions

== By profession ==
- Schools of art
- Schools of architecture
- Schools of business
- Schools of computing
- Schools of dentistry
- Schools of engineering
- Schools of law
- Schools of medicine
- Schools of nursing
- Schools of pharmacy
- Schools of theology
- Schools of veterinary medicine

== By city ==
- Abbottabad
- Faisalabad
- Gujranwala
- Hyderabad
- Islamabad
- Jhelum
- Karachi
  - List of schools in Karachi
  - List of colleges in Karachi
  - List of universities in Karachi
- Lahore
- Multan
- Peshawar
- Rawalpindi
- Sahiwal
- Sargodha
- Sialkot
- Sukkur

== See also ==
- Education in Pakistan
- List of universities in Pakistan
