= Kashmir Colony, Gujranwala Cantt =

Residential neighbourhood in Gujranwala Cantonment, Punjab, Pakistan

Kashmir Colony (كشمير كالونى) is a town of Gujranwala district in Punjab Province, Pakistan situated in Gujranwala Cantonment area.

Kashmir Colony was a small village in the 1970s but now it is a developed neighbourhood with all the facilities. The development of Kashmir colony took a step further with the building of government high school for boys and government college for girls. Population of Gujranwala Cantonment including Kashmir Colony per 2017 Census of Pakistan was 137,302.

== Other colleges and universities in Gujranwala ==
- University of the Punjab, Gujranwala Campus, bypass road Near Shalimar Town, Gujranwala
- Saint Mary's Institute of Nursing, Pharmacy, and Allied Health Sciences
- University of Health Sciences, Gujranwala Medical College, Ali Pure Chatha Road, Gujranwala
- Pakistan Atomic Energy Commission, Gujranwala Inst. of Nuclear Medicine, Sialkot Road, Nizampure, Gujranwala
- Allama Iqbal Open University, Regional Campus Gujranwala
- Virtual University of Pakistan, Gujranwala Campus, GT Road Gujranwala
- Pakistan Military Aviation Training School, Link Air Base Road off Main Shahra-e-Qauid-e-Azam, Cantt. Gujranwala
- GIFT University, Sialkot By-pass Road near Garden Town, Gujranwala
- (SM College), Gujranwala
- Saint Mary's College of Medical & Advance Studies
- Government of Commerce People's Colony Gujranwala
- Govt. College, Satellite Town, Gujranwala
- Govt. Post Graduate College for Girls, Satellite Town, Gujranwala
- Govt. Post Graduate College for Girls, Model Town, Gujranwala
- Govt. Islamia Post Graduate College, Islamia College Road, Gujranwala
- Govt. College for Girls, Islamia College Road, Gujranwala
- Govt. College for Girls, Niyaean Chowk, Urdu Bazar, Gujranwala
- Govt. Post Graduate College for Girls, Model Town, Gujranwala
- Govt. Degree College, People's Colony, Gujranwala
- Govt. College for Girls, People's Colony, Gujranwala
- Federal Govt. College, Cantt., Gujranwala
- Federal Govt. College for Girls, Cantt., Gujranwala
- Govt. College for Girls, Cantt., Gujranwala
- Chenab College Of Engineering And Technology Gujranwala
- GOVT College Of Commerce Nowshera road
- GOVT College Of Commerce for Girls, Civil Lines, Gujranwala
- GOVT College Of Technology, GT road Gujranwala
- GOVT Leather Tech. Instt. GT road Gujranwala
- GOVT tech, training Inst. Pasrur road Gujranwala
- GOVT Vocational training Instt. for Girls, Cantt. Gujranwala
- Sanat Zaar, Jinnah Road Gujranwala
- Saint Mary's Law College
- University of Central Punjab, Gujranwala Campus, Sialkot bypass road Gujranwala
- Chenab College Of Engineering And Technology Gujranwala
- Punjab Group of Colleges

== Notable personalities ==
- Arham Khalid Butt , Member, Provincial Assembly of Punjab (2013 - till date) (from Gujranwala Cantt.)
