= List of educational institutions in Multan =

This is a list of educational institutions located in the district of Shujabad in Pakistan.

== Schools ==
=== Private institutes & schools ===
- Army Public Schools & Colleges System
- AL-Falah misali high school (boys and girls), Budhla Sant, Multan
- Al-Hassan K.G. G & High School, O/S Khuni Burj, Multan
- Allied School
- Anmol School System, M.A Jinnah Road, Multan
- Beaconhouse School System
- Bilson Public School
- Bloomfield Hall Schools System
- Britain International Schools System
- British Grammar School
- British International Schools System
- Beacon Ideal School Muslim town, Budhla Sant Multan
- Government Boys High School Basti Nau Multan
- Cambridge International School System Mumtazabad, Multan
- Dar-e-Arqam Schools
- Educator Gulgasht Colony, Multan
- Evergreen Model High School Chowk Kutchery Multan
- Exclusive School System (Boys and Girls) 7, Nashaman Colony, Multan
- Govt Higher Secondary School Ghazipur, Jalalpur Pirwala, Multan
- Grew Bent System (GBS), Multan
- Government Primary School Haji pur M.A Jinnah Road, Multan
- Government Muslim High School (D.A.V. High School), Multan
- Heaven Flower Public School New multan, Hassan abad
- Iqbal English Model School, Kot Rab Nawaz Vehari Road, Multan
- Iqra Suffat ul Atfal School for Boys and Girls Multan
- Jinnah Highs School System, Multan
- Konya School System, Multan
- Khair ul Maarif School, Boson Road, Multan
- La Salle Higher Secondary School, Multan
- Lahore Grammar School
- Lahore Grammar School for Boys, Multan
- Laureate Boys Higher Secondary School, Ansar Colony, Shah Rukn-e-Alam, Multan
- Laureates Cadet School, Multan
- Leads Grammar Schools System, Babar Road, Kiri Jamandan, O/S Khuni Burj, Multan
- Learner's Castle School, Multan
- The Maktab School, Mehboob Colony, Daira Basti, Multan
- Multan Cambridge School Qasim Bela Multan
- Multan Excel Schools (Boys and Girls) New Multan, Multan
- Multan Public School and College, Multan
- Muslim Public Higher Secondary School, Mumtazabad Multan
- Nishat High School For Boys Lodhi Colony/Pir Khursheed colony
- Noukhez Group of Schools, Multan
- Pak Grammar High School, Nadirabad Phattak Sher Shah Road Multan
- PakChina Educational Linguistics Corridor, AlNoor Plaza T Chowk Shah Ruckn-E-Alam Colony, Multan, Pakistan
- Pakistan Vocational Training Centre, Multan
- PakTurk International Schools and Colleges, Multan Campus
- Peace International School
- Radial Way Public School, Shafaat Colony, Al-Tamash Road, Multan
- Roshan International School, 23-V block, New Multan
- Shah war group of schools
- Sony technical Institute, Institute of technical, Safety education and languages, Multan
- The Convent School Systems Fareed Canal View, Qasim pur Colony, Multan
- The Country School System
- The Educators School Shah Rukn-e-Alam & Mumtazabad Campuses
- The Multan Alma (High School), 7-km Khanewal Road, Multan
- The Public School, Multan
- The Smart School, Multan
- Zamir Public School, Multan
- Zavia School System, Near Goal Bagh Gulgasht Colony, Multan
- Zenabia Campus
- Zenabia Foundation
- Zenabia Juniors
- Zenabia Public

=== Schools for girls ===
- Army Public Schools & Colleges System
- Al-Hassan K.G. & Girls High School, Khuni Burj, Multan
- Al-Mushir Girls High School Chowk Shah Abbas Multan.
- Al Noor Group Of School Multan Chungi # 14
- ALI COMPUTER Institute In Multan Pakistan
- Bakhtawar Amin School of Nursing, Near Mattital Road, Multan
- Heaven Flower Public School (New Multan Street no. 21 Ho
- Lahore Grammar School for Girls, Multan
- Leads Grammar School, Babar Road, Kirri Jamndan, Multan
- Zavia School System For Girls, Near Goal Bagh Gulgasht Colony, Multan

== Colleges ==
=== Private colleges ===
- Army Public Schools & Colleges System
- Mentor Visions Professional Graphics Institute, Multan
- INEX School of Fashion Design & Professional Study, Multan
- Bakhtawar Amin School of Nursing, Multan
- Britain International College Network, Multan
- City Science College and Academy
- Concordia Colleges, Multan
- High Aim Girls Evening College Al- Mustafa Road Near Farooq Pura Chowk Multan
- Ideal group of Colleges, New Multan
- KIPS College Multan
- Leadership College Multan
- Multan Institute of Professional Studies, Multan (MIPS Multan)
- Multan Public School and College
- Muslim College of Science and Commerce
- Nishat College of Science
- Pakistan College of Science and Commerce
- Prime Institute of Technology Multan
- Punjab College Multan
- Rise College Multan
- SAKIMS College, Bosan Road, Multan
- STAK College Shah Rukn e Alam colony Multan
- Supreme Law College, Multan
- Superior College Multan
- Swedish College of Technology Vehari Chowk, Multan
- The Global College, 11/G Shah Rukn-e-Alam Colony, Multan
- The National College, Tehsil Chowk, Bosan Road, Multan

=== Public ===
- Army Public Schools & Colleges System
- Govt. High School, Lar Janubi
- Govt. High School, Sahu
- Govt. High School, Sikanderabad
- Govt. High School, Jalal Abad Shumali
- Govt. High School, Bohar
- Govt. High School, Feroze Pur
- Govt. High School, Rid
- Govt. High School, 8/MR
- Ibn-e-Qasim High School
- Govt. High School, 7/T
- Govt. High School, Chak No.1/MR
- Govt. High School, Sanbhal
- Govt. High School, Chak 4 Faiz
- Govt. High School, 2 Kot Mela Ram
- Govt. High School, Lutafabad
- Govt. Higher Secondary School, Sameeja Abad
- Govt. High School, Kot Gujran
- Govt. High School, Shujabad
- Govt. Girls High School, No.2 Shamsabad
- Govt. High School, Mardanpur
- Govt. High School, Basti Nau
- Govt. High School, Bhaini
- Govt. High School, Qadir Pur Lar
- Govt. Secondary School For Special Education for Boys (Hearing Impaired)
- Govt. Higher Secondary School, Lar
- Govt. High School, Gulzarpur
- Govt. High School, Lother
- Govt. High School, Aliwala
- Govt. High School, Hamid Pur Kanora
- Govt. High School, Khan Pur Marral
- Govt. High School, Kotli Nijabat
- Govt. High School, Tatepur
- Govt. High School Kirarwala
- Govt. High School, Sher Shah
- Govt. High School, Basti Mithu Shujabad
- Govt. High School, Rangeel Pur
- Govt. High School, Jhoke Lashkar Pur
- Govt. Higher Secondary School, Kot Mela Ram
- Govt. High School, Mattital
- Bilson Public School
- Govt. Higher Secondary School, Jalalpur Pirwala
- Govt. High School, Ghazi Pur
- Govt. High School, Jalalpur Khakhi
- Govt. High School, Kotla Maharan
- Govt. High School, Mullan Faqir
- La Salle Higher Secondary School
- Govt. High School, Ganwen Shujabad
- Govt. High School, Saray
- Govt. High School, 18/MR
- Govt. High School, Toder Pur Shujabad
- Beaconhouse Public School, Boys Branch
- Govt. High School, Basti Jaleel
- Govt. High School, Basti Malook
- Govt. Higher Secondary School, Bahadar Pur
- Govt. High School, 69/M
- Govt. High School, Bumb Jalalpur Pirwala
- The Public School
- Govt. High School, Chak Jhallar Shujabad
- Govt. High School, Chak R.S Shujabad
- Govt. Higher Secondary School, Raja Ram, Teh. Shujabad
- Govt. High School, Juggowala
- Govt. High School, Punjabi Shujabad
- Govt. High School, Bagrain Shujabad
- Govt. High School, Khan Bela, Jalalpur Pirwala
- Govt. High School, Vaince Shujabad
- Govt. High School, Hayat Khan Wala
- Govt. High School, Talkot Shujabad
- Govt. High School, Traggarh
- Govt. High School, Kotla Chakar
- Govt. High School, Pounta Teh. Shujabad
- Govt. High School, Inayat Pur Jalalpur Pirwala
- Govt. High School, Havaili Lang
- Govt. High School, Khuja Shujabad
- Govt. High School, Allah Abad
- Govt. High School, Obawara Shumali
- Govt. High School, Jahan Pur
- Govt. Girls High School Kotli Nijabat
- Raza Shah Public School
- Govt. Girls High School, Military Form
- Govt. Girls High School, Sher Shah
- Govt. Girls High School, Qadir Pur Ran
- Govt. Girls Higher Secondary School, Tate Pur
- Govt. Girls High School, Chak 5-Faiz
- Govt. Girls High School, Ayazabad Maral
- Sultan Foundation Girls High School, Mumtazabad
- Govt. Girls High School, Jalalpur Pirwala
- Govt. Girls High School, Basti Nau
- Govt. Girls High School, Matotali
- Govt. Girls High School, Zarif Shaheed
- Govt. Girls High School, Sikandarabad
- Govt. Girls High School, Suraj Miani
- Govt. Girls High School, Kabooter Mandi
- Govt. Girls High School, Loother
- Pakistan Public Girls High School
- Govt. Girls Higher Secondary School, Shujabad
- Govt. Noor Jehan Girls High School, Ismailabad
- Govt. Girls Higher Secondary School, Chah Bohar Wala
- Govt. Girls High School, Haram Gate
- Govt. Girls Higher Secondary School, Piran Ghaib
- Govt. Islamia Girls High School, Daulat Gate
- Govt. Model Muslim Girls High School
- Govt. Girls Comprehensive Higher Secondary School, Gulgasht
- Govt. Iqbal Girls High School, Hussain Agahi
- Govt. Girls High School, District Jail Road
- Sacred Heart Girls High School, Multan Cantt
- Govt. Girls High School, Willayatabad No.2
- Govt. Girls High School, Moon Light, New Multan
- Govt. Girls High School, New Central Jail
- Ali Garh Model Girls High School, Gulgasht
- Mustafa Shah Islamia Girls High School
- Govt. Girls High School, Budhla Sant
- Govt. Girls High School, Makhdum Rashid
- Govt. Girls High School, Lar
- Govt. Girls Nusrat-Ul-Islam High School, Multan Cantt
- Govt. Al-Hussain Isl. Secondary School, Muzaffarabad
- Govt. High School, Makhdum Rasheed
- Govt. Higher Secondary School, Qadir Pur Ran
- Multan Public School and College
- Govt. Millat High School, New Multan
- Govt. Nusrat-ul-Islam High School, Multan Cantt
- Govt. Samra Public High School
- Govt. Jame-ul-Aloom High School, New Multan
- Beaconhouse Public School for Girls
- Govt. Bokhari Public High School
- Govt. High School, Piran Ghaib
- Govt. M.A. Jinnah High School Qasimpur Colony
- Govt. Iqbal Secondary School
- Govt. Pakistan High School
- Govt. Higher Secondary School, Budhla Sant
- Govt. Higher Secondary School, Ailam Pur
- Govt. High School, Ayazabad Maral
- Noukhez Public High School, New Multan
- Govt. New Millat High School, Mumtazabad
- Govt. Islamia High School, Aam Khas Bagh
- Boys High School, Pakarab Fertilizer Ltd.
- Multan Gems High School For Girls
- Shahwar Model Girls High School, Jalilabad
- St. Mary’s Convent Girls Higher Secondary School, Multan Cantt
- Govt. Muslim High School
- Govt. Model High School, Shamasabad
- Govt. Model High School, Gulgasht Colony
- Govt. High School, Matotli
- Govt. Comprehensive School
- Govt. High School, Nawab Pur
- Govt. Islamia High School, Daulat Gate
- Govt. Islamia High School, Haram Gate
- Govt. C.T.M. High School, Ismailabad
- Govt. Atta Faiz-e-Aam High School
- Govt. Jauhar High School
- Govt. M.C High School, Rashid Abad
- Govt. Rafah-e-Aam High School
- Govt. Secondary School of Special Education for Hearing Impaired (Girls)
- Govt. Pilot Secondary School
- The Olive Tree School (for girls), Gulgasht Colony
- Gilson Public High School (for girls), New Multan
- Pak Turk International School & College
- Junaid Public High School (for boys), People Colony
- Govt. High School, Sabra Jalalpur Pirwala
- Muslim English Public Boys High School, 71-Mujtabad Canal View
- Govt. High School, Lal Pur
- Sibtain Highs English Medium High School, Shah Rukn-e-Alam
- Bahria Foundation High School, 26-Officers Colony
- Grammar High School, Multan Cantt
- Missali Junior Public Secondary School (Regd.)
- Kids Foundation School (for girls), Kachehry Road
- Premier Public School (for girls), Bosan Road
- Govt. Girls High School, Jal Wala
- Govt. Girls High School, Railway Gate, Shujabad

==== Colleges for Boys ====
- F.G. College for Boys, Multan Cantt.
- Government Emerson College Multan
- Govt. Alamdar Hussain Islamia College, Multan
- Govt. College, Civil lines, Multan
- Govt. College, Jalalpur Pirwala
- Govt. College, Makhdoom Rashid
- Govt. College, Qadirpur Ran
- Govt. College, Shujabad
- Govt. College for Elementary Teachers, Chungi No. 6, Multan
- Govt. College of Commerce, Azmat Wasti Road, Multan
- Govt. College of Commerce, Qasimpur Colony, Multan
- Govt. College of Commerce, Shujabad
- Govt. College of Science, Multan
- Govt. College of Technology, Multan
- Govt. Millat Degree College, Multan
- Govt. Walliat Hussain Islamia College, Multan
- Rise College of Science, Peer Khurshid Colony, Multan
- Institute of Cost and Management Accountants of Pakistan (ICMA Pakistan), Multan

==== Colleges for Girls ====
- F.G. College for Women, Multan
- Govt. College for Women, Chungi No. 6, Multan
- Govt. College for Women, Chungi No. 14, Multan
- Govt. College for Women, Jalalpur Pirwala
- Govt. College for Women, Kutchery, Multan
- Govt. College for Women, Makhdoom Rashid
- Govt. College for Women, Mumtazabad, Multan
- Govt. College for Women, Shah Rukn-e-Alam, Multan
- Govt. College for Women, Shujabad
- Govt. College of Home Economics, Multan
- Govt. Fatima Jinnah College for Women, Masoom Shah Road, Multan
- Govt. Zainab College for Women, Chowk Shaheedan, Multan
- Institute of Cost and Management Accountants of Pakistan. (ICMA Pakistan), Multan

== Professional Education Centers ==
- BirdView Logic Academy (Software House and IT Training), Faisalabad
- INEX Institute (INEX School of Fashion Design & Professional Study) Multan
- The Net Rider,(House of networking, Graphic Designing, Freelancing, Multan
- Institute of Modern Arts and Languages (IMAL 360), Multan
- Institute of Cost and Management Accountants of Pakistan (ICMA Pakistan), Multan
- Multan Homeopathic College and Hospital, Multan
- Pakistan Vocational Training Centre, Multan
- The Ace International School System
- Ace School of Languages, 2-A Bosan Road, Multan, 0616221383

== Medical and Dental Schools ==
- Bakhtawar Amin Medical College, Multan
- Bakhtawar Amin School of Nursing, Multan
- CMH Multan Institute of Medical Sciences (CIMS), Multan
- Multan Medical and Dental College, Multan
- Nishtar Institute of Dentistry, Multan
- Nishtar Medical College, Multan

== Universities ==
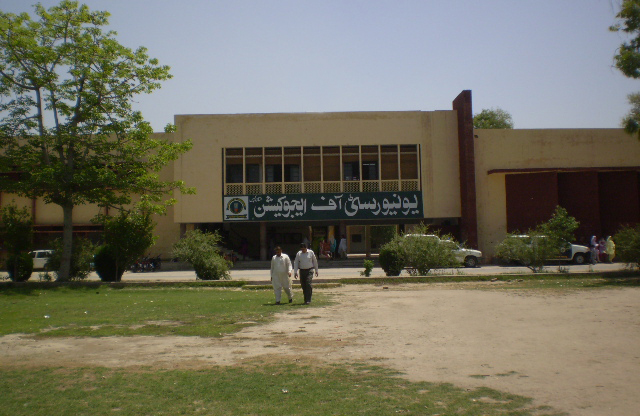
University of Education Lahore (Multan Campus)

- University of Education Lahore (Multan Campus)
- Muhammad Nawaz Sharif University of Agriculture, Jalalpur PirWala, Multan
- Muhammad Nawaz Sharif University of Engineering and Technology, Multan
- Air University Multan Campus, (AUMC) Islamabad, Pakistan Air Force
- Bahauddin Zakariya University, Multan
- University of Southern Punjab, Multan
- Times University Multan
- National College of Business Administration and Economics, Lahore (Sub Campus Multan Campus)
- National University of Modern Languages (NUML), Islamabad (Multan Campus)
- NFC Institute of Engineering and Technology, Multan
- University of Education, Lahore (Multan Campus)
- Virtual University of Pakistan, Lahore (Multan Campus)
- Allama Iqbal Open University,(Multan Campus)
- Women University Multan
- Emerson University, Multan
- Multan University of Science & Technology
- National University of Computer and Emerging Sciences(Multan Campus)
- Usman Daud University Multan (UDU)
- Pakistan Institute of Engineering and Technology, Multan

Newly Established Universities (Government of Punjab Charted/PEC Visited twice)

- Muhammad Nawaz Sharif University of Engineering and Technology, Multan

== See also ==
- Higher Education Commission of Pakistan
- Top 10 Schools in Multan for Matric
- List of universities in Pakistan
  - List of universities in Punjab, Pakistan
- List of medical schools in Pakistan
  - List of medical schools in Punjab, Pakistan
