= List of educational institutions in Gujranwala =

Gujranwala City 2017 Is Most Educated City In Pakistan, 62.4 percent people's educated in Gujranwala

This is a list of educational institutions in Gujranwala, Pakistan.

== Schools ==
- WESCA PAKISTSN, https://www.wescapakistan.com/
- Youth Academy
- Youth Institute of Technology
- Youth Group of Schools and Colleges
- Government College Gujranwala
- Greenz College Sialkot road (Gujranwala)
- Kin's International Public High School, Gujranwala
- Aspire Group Of Colleges Gujranwala
- The Savvy Schools Gujranwala
- SOFT Solutions College (Gujranwala)
- Cantt View Public School Gujranwala, (Dogranwala Warraich)
- The City School, Gujranwala Campus, Sialkot by. pass Gujranwala
- Roots School System, DC Road, Gujranwala
- Science Base School
- The Challenge School System, Outside Khiali Gate, Mubarik Shah Gujranwala.
- Pakistan International Public School and College, Gujranwala (PIPS)
  - Main Campus: Satellite Town
  - Boys Campus: Sialkot Bypass Road
  - Jinnah Campus: Jinnah Road
- Quaid-e-Azam Divisional Public School, GT rd.
- Beacon House School System, Palm tree Campus: Sialkot bypass road., Wapda town Campus, Civil Lines Campus
- Army Public Schools and Colleges, Cantt.
- Bloomfield Hall School, Satellite Town & Cantt.
- St. Joseph's Schools, Satellite Town, Khokharki
- St. Mary's English High School (Boys & Girls) Session Court Road, Gujranwala
- St. Peter's School, Civil Lines
- Bibi n Baba school, Civil Lines
- Punjab Colleges
- Gift Colleges
- Superior Colleges
- Youth Group of Schools and Colleges
- Youth Academy
- Youth Institute of Technology
- ILM Colleges
- National Group of Colleges
- KIPS Academy
- KIPS Colleges
- Pioneer Academy, Satellite Town, Near Billa Pan Chock, Gujranwala
- Lahore Grammar School, Sattlite Town, Skt. bypass road near Garden town
- Science Focus School
- Federal Science College, Wapda Town
- Noor School System, DC Colony
- Al-Farooq Public School, Shalimar Town
- Jamia-tul-Bannat, Model Town
- Aisha Girls Degree College, Shalimar Town
- National Aims School, G. Magnolia Park Housing Scheme
- Grammar Public School, Skt. bypass road, Satellite town
- Science Locus Schools, Stlite Town
- Elite Colleges, Stlite Town, Cantt.
- The College of Law
- M. Ali Jinnah Law College
- Premier Law College
- The Star inst. Skt Road
- Habib Builders Associates Academy
- Shaheen Islamia Model School (boys camps and girls camps)St#4 Atta Road Shaheen Abad, Gujranwala
- [Future Vision School System (Boys Campus)], Gujranwala
- [Jadeed Dastgir Ideal High Schools], Gujranwala
- Punjab School System, Professors Colony, Gujranwala
- Zain Public High School, Jinnah Road Link D.C Road, Gujranwala.
- Tahir Science Academy
- Gujranwala Grammar School System, Sialkot Bypass, Gujranwala
- Gujranwala College of Computing Gujranwala
- Pakistan Foundation Model School
- Apple Seed School System is located in main city area. The building comprises Pre-Primary, Primary and Pre-Secondary section floors.
- Askari Public School 13, 19- Moh.Islamabad
- Dawn Public High School, Garjakh
- Everest School System, 19/29 Mohalla Islamabad, Gujranwala
- Eden Home School System & Child Development Centre, Satellite Town
- Future Vision School System, Shaheenabad, Gujranwala.
- Focus Computer College, Model Town, Gujranwala.
- Focus Education System, Model Town, Gujranwala.
- Focus National School, Model Town, Gujranwala.
- Harward New Generation School, Satellite Town
- The Oxford Science High School, Allama Iqbal Town, Gujranwala Cantt.
- Pacific International High School, Asad Colony
- The Pakistan School
- Punjab Public Secondary School
- Schools of Excellence
- St. Mary's Girls High School
- Gujranwala Institute of Medical and Emerging Sciences
- Jalal Model High School For Girls Barkat Colony Gujranwala
- School One Education System, Baghban Pura, Gujranwala
- Shaheen Islamia Model School (boys camps and girls camps)St#4 Atta Road Shaheen Abad, Gujranwala.
- Shaukat-e-Islam High School & College Jalal Balaggan(Via Ghakkhar City) Gujranwala.
- National College of Computer Sciences (Gujranwala)
- Air Foundation School System, Mian Zia ul Haq Road Civil lines, Gujranwala.
- CMS College for Boys, Gujranwala.
- Al-Falah School System Shaheenabad Gujranwala-.
- Best School System 39/A Satellite town Gujranwala.
- Pakistan Foundation Model School 21 -A, Gujranwala 52250.
- The Unique School Sialkot Road, Angel's Campus, Opposite Session Court, Gujranwala.
- American International School 21 -A, Gujranwala 52250
- CMS College for Girls, Gujranwala
- A+ school system, shahra e quaid e azam rahwali cantt

Lyceum campus girls high school wapda town gujranwala

- Allied School (Ghakhar Campus)
- Govt. Higher Secondary School Ghakkhar (Boys)
- Govt. Higher Secondary School Ghakkhar No.1 (Boys)
- Lincoln Grammar School (People's Colony )
- Lincoln Academy Of Science And Commerce (People's Colony )

== Colleges and Universities ==
- Saeed Islamic College Gujranwala 58-A, Satellite Town, Gujranwala
- University of the Punjab, Gujranwala Campus, bypass road Near Shalimar Town, Gujranwala
- Saint Mary's Institute of Nursing, Pharmacy, and Allied Health Sciences
- University of Health Sciences, Gujranwala Medical College, Ali Pure Chatha Road, Gujranwala
- Pakistan Atomic Energy Commission, Gujranwala Inst. of Nuclear Medicine, Sialkot Road, Nizampure, Gujranwala
- Allama Iqbal Open University, Regional Campus Gujranwala
- Virtual University of Pakistan, Gujranwala Campus, GT Road Gujranwala
- Pakistan Military Aviation Training School, Link Air Base Road off Main Shahra-e-Qauid-e-Azam, Cantt. Gujranwala
- University Of Sargodha, Gujranwala Campus, Gujranwala Campus, Dastgir Road Satellite Town & Sialkot Bypass road Gujranwala
- GIFT University, Sialkot By-pass Road near Garden Town, Gujranwala
- (SM College), Gujranwala
- Saint Mary's College of Medical & Advance Studies
- Government of Commerce People's Colony Gujranwala
- CMS College for Boys, Satellite Town, Gujranwala.
- Govt. College, Satellite Town, Gujranwala
- Govt. Post Graduate College for Girls, Satellite Town, Gujranwala
- Govt. Post Graduate College for Girls, Model Town, Gujranwala
- Govt. Islamia Post Graduate College, Islamia College Road, Gujranwala
- Govt. College for Girls, Islamia College Road, Gujranwala
- Govt. College for Girls, Niyaean Chowk, Urdu Bazar, Gujranwala
- Govt. Post Graduate College for Girls, Model Town, Gujranwala
- Govt. Degree College, People's Colony, Gujranwala
- Govt. College for Girls, People's Colony, Gujranwala
- Federal Govt. College, Cantt., Gujranwala
- Federal Govt. College for Girls, Cantt., Gujranwala
- Govt. College for Girls, Cantt., Gujranwala
- Chenab College Of Engineering And Technology Gujranwala
- GOVT College Of Commerce Nowshera road
- GOVT College Of Commerce for Girls, Civil Lines, Gujranwala
- GOVT College Of Technology, GT road Gujranwala
- GOVT Leather Tech. Instt. GT road Gujranwala
- GOVT tech, training Inst. Pasrur road Gujranwala
- GOVT Vocational training Instt. for Girls, Cantt. Gujranwala
- Sanat Zaar, Jinnah Road Gujranwala
- Saint Mary's Law College
- University of Central Punjab, Gujranwala Campus, Sialkot bypass road Gujranwala
- Chenab College Of Engineering And Technology Gujranwala
