= List of educational institutions in Jhelum =

This is a list of educational institutions located in the district of Jhelum District in Pakistan.

== Primary and secondary educational institutions ==
- Air Foundation High School System Jhelum Campus
- Army Public School and College
- Beaconhouse School System, Main G.T. Road
- Falcon House Secondary School Jhelum, Pakistan
- Presentation Convent School, Jhelum
- St. Thomas' High School, Jhelum
- Roots Millennium Schools, Citi Housing Society, Jhelum
- FG Public School Jhelum Cantt
- Govt. M. C. Islamia Higher Secondary School Jhelum (Classes 6-14)

== Tertiary and quaternary educational institutions ==
=== Universities ===
- University of the Punjab, Jhelum Campus
- Virtual University of Pakistan, Jhelum Campus

=== Women's degree colleges ===
- Govt. College for Women, Pind Dadan Khan, District
- Govt College For Women, Katchery Road
- Govt. College for Women, Dina, District
- Community Model Girls higher Secondary School Sanghoi

=== Men's degree colleges ===
- Government Degree College Jhelum
- Govt. Degree College, Talianwala, Jhelum Fahad College
- Govt. Postgraduate College
- Al-Biruni Govt. College, Pind Dadan Khan
- Govt. Degree College, Sohawa
- Govt. Degree College, Dina

=== Co-educational colleges ===
- Federal Govt. College, Mangla Cantt
- Bahria Foundation College, GT Road

=== Commerce colleges ===
- Govt. College of Commerce, Bilal Town
- Wings College of Commerce, 4-Civil Lines
- M.A. Jinnah College of Commerce & Computer Science, Al-Bilal Building, Old G.T. Road

=== Law colleges ===
- Jinnah Law College near Kutcheri

=== Medical colleges ===
- Jhelum Homeopathic Medical College, GT Road Jada
- Jhelum Medical College (under process)
