= University of the Punjab, Gujranwala =

Public university in Gujranwala, Pakistan

University of the Punjab, Gujranwala Campus
- پنجاب یونیورسٹی گوجرانوالہ کیمپس
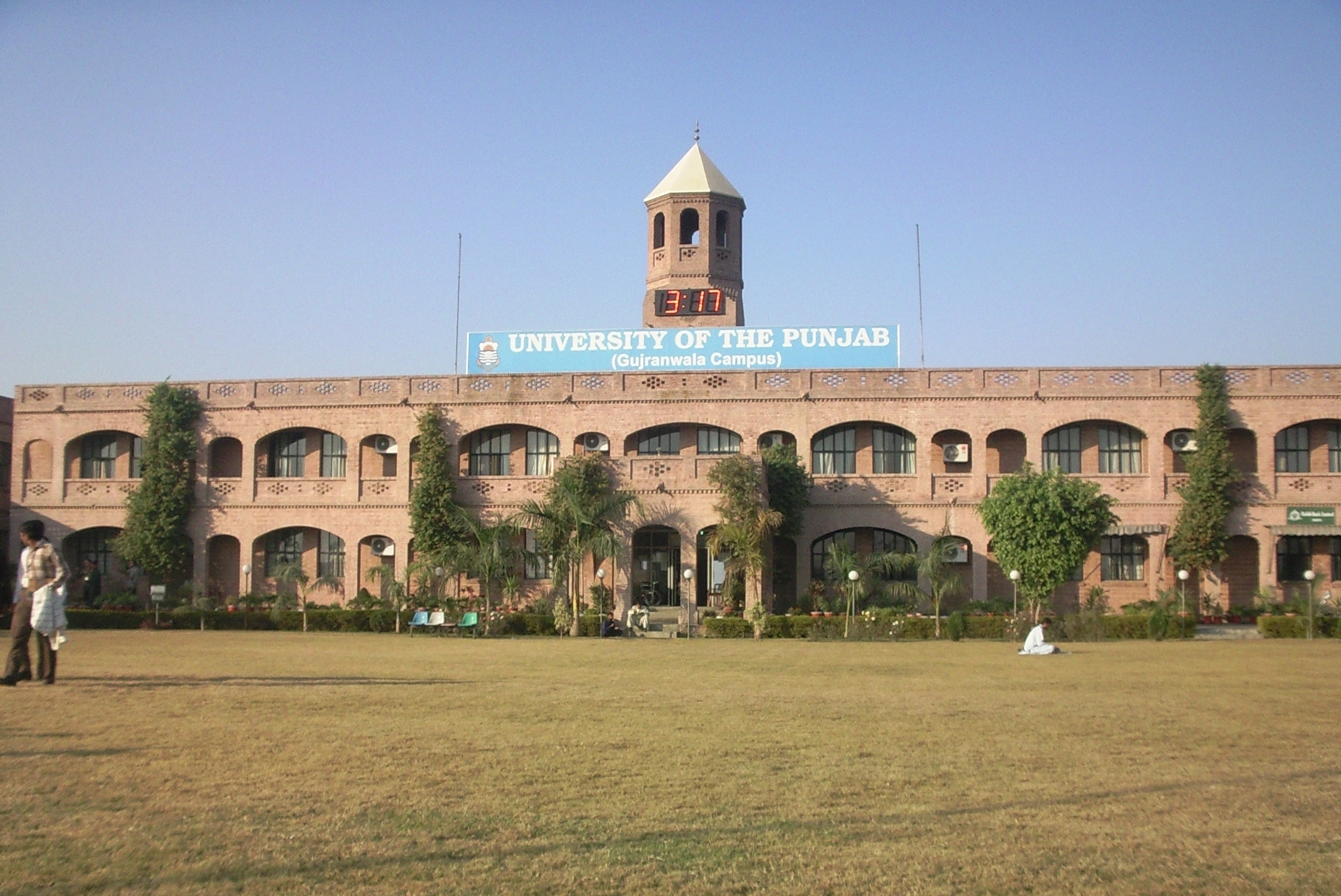
- Motto: Punjabi: اتحاد، یقین محکم، تنظیم (Ittehad, Yaqeen-e-Mohkam, Tanzeem)
- Motto in English: Unity, Faith, Discipline
- Type: Public
- Affiliations: University of the Punjab, Higher Education Commission (Pakistan)
- Vice-Chancellor: Niaz Ahmad Akhtar
- Director: Naveed Iqbal Chaudhry
- Location: Gujranwala, Punjab, Pakistan; 32.190336°N 74.152994°E
- Campus: Suburb, 81 kanals (10.03 acres)
- Colours: Blue, bronze, red
- Nickname: PUGC
- Website: pugc.edu.pk

University of the Punjab, Gujranwala Campus (also referred to as Punjab University Gujranwala campus or PUGC) is a satellite campus of University of the Punjab, Lahore which is located in Gujranwala, Punjab, Pakistan. It is the third-oldest of the five campuses of the University of the Punjab. The university campus occupies 81 kanals (approx. 10.03 acres) located near the Ali Pur Chowk, Rawalpindi bypass, Gujranwala. The campus offers undergraduate, graduate and post-graduate programs in six main departments.

== Degrees offered ==
- Department of Commerce
  - M.Phil. (Commerce)
  - M.Com. (Hons.) 1.5 years
  - M.Com. (Hons.) 3.5 years
  - B.Com. (Hons.)
- Department of Business Administration
  - MBA Executive
  - MBA (Hons.) 1.5 years
  - BBA (Hons.)
  - Post Graduate Diploma in Business Administration
- Department of Banking & Finance
  - BBA (Hons.) Banking & Finance
- Department of Information Technology
  - BS Information Technology
  - BS Computer Science
  - BS Software Engineering
- Department of Law
  - LLB (Hons.)
- Department of English Language and Literature
  - B.S English Literature

== Societies at PUGC ==
- PUGC Society of Computer Science
- PUGC Sports Society
- PUGC Debating Society
- PUGC Character Building Society
- PUGC Event Management Society
- PUGC Art and Design Society
- PUGC Alumni Association

== See also ==
- Gujranwala
- GIFT University
- University of the Punjab
- Government College Gujranwala

== Other Colleges and Universities in Gujranwala ==
- University of the Punjab, Gujranwala Campus, bypass road Near Shalimar Town, Gujranwala
- Saint Mary's Institute of Nursing, Pharmacy, and Allied Health Sciences
- University of Health Sciences, Gujranwala Medical College, Ali Pure Chatha Road, Gujranwala
- Pakistan Atomic Energy Commission, Gujranwala Inst. of Nuclear Medicine, Sialkot Road, Nizampure, Gujranwala
- Allama Iqbal Open University, Regional Campus Gujranwala
- Virtual University of Pakistan, Gujranwala Campus, GT Road Gujranwala
- Pakistan Military Aviation Training School, Link Air Base Road off Main Shahrah-e-Qauid-e-Azam, Cantt. Gujranwala
- GIFT University, Sialkot By-pass Road near Garden Town, Gujranwala
- (SM College), Gujranwala
- Saint Mary's College of Medical & Advance Studies
- Government of Commerce People's Colony Gujranwala
- Govt. College, Satellite Town, Gujranwala
- Govt. Post Graduate College for Girls, Satellite Town, Gujranwala
- Govt. Post Graduate College for Girls, Model Town, Gujranwala
- Govt. Islamia Post Graduate College, Islamia College Road, Gujranwala
- Govt. College for Girls, Islamia College Road, Gujranwala
- Govt. College for Girls, Niyaean Chowk, Urdu Bazar, Gujranwala
- Govt. Post Graduate College for Girls, Model Town, Gujranwala
- Govt. Degree College, People's Colony, Gujranwala
- Govt. College for Girls, People's Colony, Gujranwala
- Federal Govt. College, Cantt., Gujranwala
- Federal Govt. College for Girls, Cantt., Gujranwala
- Govt. College for Girls, Cantt., Gujranwala
- Chenab College Of Engineering And Technology Gujranwala
- Govt. College of Commerce Nowshera road
- Govt. College Of Commerce for Girls, Civil Lines, Gujranwala
- Govt. College Of Technology, GT Road, Gujranwala
- Govt. Leather Tech. Instt. GT Road, Gujranwala
- Govt. Technical Training Institute, Pasrur Road, Gujranwala
- Govt. Vocational Training Institute for Girls, Cantt. Gujranwala
- Sanat Zaar, Jinnah Road, Gujranwala
- Saint Mary's Law College
- University of Central Punjab, Gujranwala Campus, Sialkot bypass road, Gujranwala
- Chenab College of Engineering and Technology, Gujranwala
- Punjab Group of Colleges
