= STHS =

STHS may refer to:

== Education ==
=== United States ===
- St. Thomas High School (Houston, Texas), a high school for boys in Houston, Texas, USA
- Santa Teresa High School, a high school in San Jose, California, USA
- South Tahoe High School, a high school in South Lake Tahoe, California, USA
- South Terrebonne High School, a high school Bourg, Louisiana, USA
- Springfield Township High School, a high school in Oreland, Pennsylvania, USA
- Sussex Technical High School, a high school in Georgetown, Delaware, USA

=== Worldwide ===
- St. Thomas High School (Quebec), a high school in Pointe-Claire, Quebec, Canada
- St. Thomas' High School, Jhelum, a high school in Jhelum, Punjab, Pakistan
- St. Thomas High School, Honnavar, a high school in Uttara Kannada, Karnataka, India
- Sydney Technical High School, a high school for boys in Sydney, New South Wales, Australia

== Other uses ==
- Saint Thomas Health Services, a not-for-profit group of Middle Tennessee hospitals based in Nashville, Tennessee, USA
