= Fauzia Abbas =

Pakistani diplomat

Personal details
- Born: 20 June 1951 (age 75) New Delhi, India
- Occupation: Diplomat

Fauzia Abbas (born 20 June 1951 in New Delhi, India) is a career diplomat from Pakistan.

She served as the country's Ambassador to Denmark and Lithuania from November 2006 until December 2013. She has previously, served as Ambassador to Switzerland, Liechtenstein, and the Holy See (March 2003 to November 2006). As of December 2013, she was retired and now lives in Islamabad, Pakistan. Fauzia Abbas did create a number of diplomatic crises, including accusing the Danish newspaper Jyllandsposten, of being responsible for the 8 killings done in connection with the attack on the Danish Embassy in Pakistan, as well as showing disrespect for the Danish court system by refusing to follow a ruling in favour of a local employee, despite the fact that the Embassy did not have diplomatic immunity in this case.

== Education and family ==
Her father, Mufti Muhammad Abbas, was also a career diplomat, and served as caretaker Chief Minister of Khyber-Pakhtunkhwa in 1993.

Her husband, Shahbaz, was also a Pakistani career diplomat who served as ambassador in Norway and Austria. Abbas has two daughters.

She graduated from the University of Punjab, Lahore in 1971 and the Australian National University, ACT in 1972.

== Career ==
She joined the service in 1977.
