= Saif-ur-Rehman (prisoner) =

Pakistani citizen

Muhammad Saif-ur-Rehman Khan is a Pakistani citizen who was wrongly detained in Chile on charges of terrorism, and later acquitted.

== Background ==
Muhammad Saif-ur-Rehman Khan was born in 1982, in Islamabad, Pakistan, where he spent most of his early life. After completing his A-levels from the University College of Islamabad (UCI), he went on to complete a bachelor's degree from the University of Punjab in Lahore. He is said to have frequently toured the United Kingdom (where he took part in amateur fashion modelling) and the United States. Saif's college principal at UCI, Catalina Alliende, a Chilean national who also happened to be the honorary consul of Chile in Islamabad, encouraged him to travel to Chile to learn the Spanish language at the eFronteras institute in Santiago and also to study tourism and hospitality. Upon his arrival, he enrolled in language courses and rented a room in a boarding house.

On May 11, 2010, a U.S. official confirmed that Saif's name was on a terror watch list. However, there were no allegations leveled against him. Saif-ur-Rehman Khan was also not found to have any links with any illicit group. In May 2010, in an interview to media the Pakistani ambassador in Santiago, Chile stated that "Saif ur Rehman may have been framed".

All suspicions were put to rest by the court in Santiago Chile that acquitted him and prosecutors dropped all charges against him. All along, Saif ur Rehman and his family claimed that the entire fiasco may have been a result of a "misunderstanding" stemming from mistaken identity.

== Biography ==
On May 7, 2010, Saif was approached by three Americans while attending services at a mosque. Earlier that day, he had received a call from the U.S. Embassy in Santiago requesting that he come to the embassy for an identity check (it was later learnt that the purpose of the call-up was for letting him know his U.S. visa had been revoked).

After informing the local Pakistani embassy, Saif proceeded towards the American embassy on May 10. When he was scanned while entering, traces of TNT and tetryl were found in the documents and cell phone which he submitted at the reception. Some reports said residue was found on his body, but it was later determined that nothing had been found on his body, clothes and hands. While he was locked in the embassy building, hours before his official detention, Chilean police searched his apartment, finding no sign of any explosive residues. However, a second search later on the same day uncovered traces of tetryl on several items of clothing, a small suitcase and a laptop.

The Chilean interior minister, Rodrigo Hinzpeter, declared the Pakistani student a "terrorist" before the investigations concluded. The controversial Chilean anti-terrorism law, which allows some bypass of due process, was invoked. The courts overturned this application of the law, thus releasing Khan after five days of detention.

== Release ==
Upon his release, Muhammad Saif-ur-Rehman Khan gave a press conference where he pleaded his innocence. The investigations continued and prosecutors repeatedly requested more time from the courts. Meanwhile, the parents of the Pakistani student traveled to Santiago to accompany their son and aid in his legal defense.

== Outcome ==
The investigation continued for more than 7 months. The U.S. Embassy in Santiago invoked diplomatic immunity and refused to allow the embassy staff who handled his belongings to be questioned by the Chilean courts. The Pakistani student appeared in various television and news programs and affirmed his trust in the Chilean judiciary. Proceedings in late 2010 found that Khan was not guilty. Subsequently, the prosecutors dropped the charges against him amidst much media coverage. A coalition of friends and family of Saif ur Rehman launched an effective media campaign to dispel the misinformation that appeared in media especially in May 2010. His trial substantially brought Chile–Pakistan relations to the limelight. In his last TV interviews, he asked the government and the people behind this ordeal for an apology and got immense support from the human rights commission in the congress of Chile.
