= Mohsin Razi =

Pakistani diplomat (born 1955)

- Born: May 26, 1955 (age 71); Karachi, Pakistan
- Education: Masters in Political Science, University of the Punjab
- Occupation: Diplomat
- Spouse: Sarwat Razi
- Children: Beenish Razi; Haider Razi

Mohsin Razi (b. May 26, 1955 in Karachi) is a career diplomat from Pakistan. He has served as Ambassador to Philippines since October 2009.

Earlier he served as the Consul General of Pakistan in New York, and was the former Director General National Authority & Disarmament Cell in Islamabad, Pakistan from 2004 to 2006. He has previously served in the Pakistani Embassies in Germany, Iraq and The Netherlands. He speaks English, Urdu, Punjabi, German, and Arabic.

== Education ==
Razi holds a master's degree in Political Science, from the University of Punjab, and has attended the National Institute of Public Administration, Lahore.

== Career ==
Razi joined the foreign service in 1982, and has served on several desks in Islamabad, such as Director Economic Cooperation Organization (ECO), Nepal, Bangladesh, Burma & Sri Lanka (NBBS). He was also Director General Europe.

=== Consul General ===
Mr. Mohsin Razi is currently the Consul General in New York for Pakistan. He is also accredited to Connecticut, Delaware, Kentucky Maine, Massachusetts, Michigan, New Hampshire, New Jersey, North Dakota, Ohio, Rhode Island, South Dakota and Vermont.
