= Chile–Pakistan relations =

- Pakistan: Chile

Chile–Pakistan relations refers to the bilateral relations between Pakistan and Chile. Neither country has a resident ambassador. Pakistan has a non resident ambassador in Buenos Aires. Chile has a non resident ambassador in Abu Dhabi.

== Diplomacy ==
On the diplomatic front, Chile had previously maintained a resident mission in Pakistan up until 1989, but has expressed 'hope' that they would be able to reopen their resident diplomatic mission 'soon.' Pakistan has maintained an embassy in Santiago from 2008 to 2014. The two countries have also signed an MoU for the establishment of Bilateral Political Consultations at the Foreign Secretary level.

Chile closed their embassy in Pakistan because of visa fraud by the Pakistan embassy in Islamabad as per official statement from the Government of Chile. Faced with the information released on the falsification of visas to enter Chile in Pakistan and the action of the honorary consul of Chile in Islamabad, the Ministry of Foreign Affairs states the following:

1. In the early hours of Friday, November 19, 2010, the Chilean Investigative Police proceeded to detain a group of Pakistani citizens, allegedly linked to a visa forgery network to enter Chile illegally.
2. From the outset the Ministry of Foreign Affairs has collaborated in the investigation, jointly and in coordination with the staff of the Ministry of Interior, the Investigation Police and the National Intelligence Agency (ANI).
3. In that context, on November 15, 2010, the Chief of the Immigration Department of the Consular Directorate General moved to Islamabad, Pakistan, to preliminary inspect and investigate the reported facts and verify in situ the operation of the Chilean Honorary Consulate in that city.
4. The Honorary Consul of Chile in Islamabad, Catalina Alliende, has collaborated to clarify this investigation. In fact, she alerted the Investigative Police at the end of July this year of the first history of visa misrepresentation.
5. The Ministry of Foreign Affairs has instructed the Honorary Consul to reinforce the security measures at the consulate, as well as the change of procedure for the granting of visas, which although they will continue to be requested in Pakistan, will be delivered to the Airport Santiago International, with prior authorization from the Ministry of Interior as is the usual procedure. Pakistan has also closed its embassy at Santiago recently.

According to a 2013 BBC World Service Poll, only 19% of Chileans surveyed view Pakistan's influence positively, with 46% expressing a negative view.

Pakistan and Chile have enjoyed cordial relations marked by cooperation at the multilateral fora. In 2020, the two countries co-hosted a high-level poverty event, ‘Poverty at a crossroad: using leadership and the Multidimensional Poverty Index (MPI)' at the 75th Session of the United Nations General Assembly. Dr. Sania Nishtar (Special Assistant to the Prime Minister on Social Protection and Poverty Alleviation, Pakistan) and Karla Rubilar (Minister for Social Development and Families, Chile) co-hosted the session. The virtual event was attended by Pakistan's Prime Minister Imran Khan, Chile's President Sebastian Piñera and leaders of Afghanistan, Costa Rica, Honduras, and Nepal.

== Economic relations ==
In 2006–07, approximately US$69 million worth of goods were traded between the two countries, with Pakistan's exports to Chile accounting for US$66 million. Chilean company Antofagasta Minerals as part of a multinational consortium along with Chilean part owned Tethyan Copper Company, Casrie Bogsi, Barrick Miningn from Canada are expected to invest up to US$4 billion in exploration and development of Rekodiq field in Pakistan, however, the initial investment is expected to be US$200 million Reqo Diq areas have the world's fifth largest reserves of gold and copper.

Pakistan-Chile trade stood at US$113.8 million in 2018, with Pakistan exporting US$78.9 million and importing US$34.9 million from Chile. The two countries have expressed a desire to increase trade relations. Pakistan has stated that it recognises the 'immense trade potential' of the South American region and that it has been taking steps to enhance trade with South American countries including Chile.

Antofagasta Minerals (a Chilean mining giant) and Barrick Mining (Canadian), as part of a multinational consortium Tethyan Cooper Company, were expected to invest up to US$4 billion in exploration and development of the Rekodiq field in Pakistan. Initial investment was expected to be US$200 million. The area covering Reko Diq contain the world's fifth largest reserves of gold and copper. The project, thus far, has not been completed and is currently pending settlement at the International Court for the Settlement of Investment Disputes (ICSID).

Chilean LUKSIC group mining company has also shown interest in making new investments in Pakistan, particularly the Thar coal field which had a power generation potential of 100,000MW. LUKSIC representatives were received by Pakistan Secretary Coal and Energy Development Department Sindh. According to Santiago Times, LUKSIC group investment in Pakistan can be up to US$700 million.

In October 2010, Chilean Foreign Secretary Fernando Schmidt Ariztia visited Islamabad and held talks with Foreign Secretary Salman Bashir. During the discussion, the two sides showed interest in signing a free trade agreement between the two countries.

== Cultural Links ==
The Pakistani community in Chile is mostly concentrated in the North of the country. The Bilal Mosque in Iquique is owned by a Pakistani named Abdul Gafar Qureshi. There is a large community of Pakistanis who migrated to the port city of Iquique in Chile's north in the 1990s, who today own 95 percent of the area's 120 car lots. Pakistanis in Iquique also manage the Bilal Masjid and an Islamic school that also caters for the pressing needs of the local Muslim community. Catering to the educational needs of the Pakistani and Muslim community, there is a Pakistani school in Iquique. The mayor of Iquique referred to the Pakistani community there as "exemplary."

The Las Condes Municipality of Santiago, Chile has formally conveyed its concurrence on 22 October 2010 for setting up a “Pakistan Square” in Santiago on reciprocal basis without any financial implications. Capital Development Authority of Islamabad (CDA) had earlier allocated a space for a “Chile Square” at the intersection of Service Road East F-10 with Khayan-e-Iqbal. There is also a street in Santiago named after Pakistan as Pakistán.

== Controversy ==
In 2010, Chilean authorities accused a Pakistani student Muhammad Saif-ur-Rehman Khan of having traces of explosives at the United States embassy in Santiago, but charges were later dropped and Khan was declared innocent by authorities. The Chilean nation expressed complete solidarity with the innocent student. The support was also evident through the widespread media coverage of the case. The Pakistani student was invited to major prime-time television and radio talk shows to relate the incident. Prominent Chilean politicians and members of the Chilean senate invited the Pakistani student to the Chilean Congress to express support. The Chilean honorary visa consul in Islamabad, Catalina Alliende personally defended the Pakistani student Muhammad Saif-ur-Rehman Khan in a Chilean court in Santiago.

== See also ==
- Foreign relations of Chile
- Foreign relations of Pakistan
