= Zafar Moeen Nasir =

Pakistani educator

- Occupation: Vice-Chancellor of Punjab University (2016 – 2018)

Zafar Moeen Nasir was a former Vice-Chancellor of the University of the Punjab in Pakistan.

He resigned from his post when the Government of Punjab pressurized him to hand over 2 kanals of the university's land near Lahore's historical site Chauburji to a religious party for constructing a seminary there.
