= Air University Multan Campus =

Satellite of Air University, Islamabad

Coordinates: 29.9687°N 71.5060°E

- Other name: AUMC
- Motto: Taking Academic Excellence To New Heights
- Type: Public
- Established: 2011
- Parent institution: Pakistan Air Force
- Academic affiliations: Air University (Islamabad)
- Director: Ghulam Ali
- Location: Multan, Punjab, Pakistan
- Colours: Black, outer space, jordy blue
- Website: aumc.edu.pk

The Air University Multan Campus is a new campus of Air University (Islamabad) located in Multan, Punjab, Pakistan. It was established in 2011. It is located along Bahawalpur Road Multan with a purpose built campus.

== Departments ==
Air University Multan Campus has now three main departments:

- Department of Business Administration
- Department of Computer Science
- Department of Mathematics
- Upcoming Departments Aviation, Engineering

== Degree programs ==
Degree programs offered by Air University Multan Campus are given below:

- BBA (Hons.)
- BS Accounting and Finance
- BS Computer Science
- BS Software Engineering
- BS Information Technology
- BS Mathematics
- BS Cyber Security
- MBA
- MS Management Sciences
- MS Computer Science
- MS Mathematics
- PhD Management Sciences

== See also ==
- Pakistan Air Force schools and colleges
