= List of educational institutions in Sialkot =

This is a list of educational institutions located in Sialkot District, Pakistan.

== Schools ==
- Army Public School, 39 Zafar Ali Road, Sialkot Cantt
- Beaconhouse School System, Said Pur Gondal Road, Sialkot Cantt
- City School, Iqbal Campus (boys)
- Government High School Bogray
- Lahore Grammar School, Faraz Shaheed Road, Sialkot
- Roots Millennium Schools, Citi Housing Society Daska Road, Sialkot

== Tertiary and technical educational institutions ==
=== Engineering colleges ===
- Superior Group of Colleges kashmir road campus

=== Women's degree colleges ===
- Government College Women University, Sialkot

=== Medical colleges ===
- Islam Medical College
- Khawaja Muhammad Safdar Medical College (Formerly Sialkot Medical College)

=== Universities ===
- Government College Women University, Sialkot
- University of Central Punjab, Sialkot Campus
- University of Management and Technology Sialkot Campus
- University of Sialkot
- Virtual University of Pakistan, Sialkot Campus
