= Multan University of Science & Technology =

Private university in Multan, Pakistan

Coordinates: 30.1058°N 71.4106°E

Multan University of Science and Technology
- ملتان یونیورسٹی آف سائنس اینڈ ٹیکنالوجی
- Type: Private
- Established: 2022
- Affiliations: Higher Education Commission of Pakistan
- Address: 0.7 Km Multan Southern Bypass Rd, Chowk Nag Shah, Shershah Town, Multan, Punjab, Multan, Punjab, Pakistan
- Website: www.multanust.edu.pk

Multan University of Science and Technology (ملتان یونیورسٹی آف سائنس اینڈ ٹیکنالوجی) is a private university located in Multan, Punjab, Pakistan. Established in 2022, the university is recognized by the Higher Education Commission of Pakistan.

MUST offers classrooms, a mock courtroom for LLB students, and medical labs such as X-ray, surgical rooms, and pharmaceutical labs. Programs such as BS Computer Science, BS Information Technology, and others in the healthcare and legal domains are offered.

== See also ==
- List of universities in Pakistan
