= Zakir Hussain Shah =

England-based Pakistani politician (1951–2017)

Syed Zakir Hussain Shah (28 January 1951 – 3 June 2017) born in village Hayal Tehsil and district, Rawalpindi. He was an England-based Pakistani politician, former Member of Provincial Assembly from Rawalpindi, Punjab and a former member of the Council of Islamic Ideology of the Government of Pakistan. He died on 3 June 2017 at Shifa International Hospital Pakistan, due to organ failure.

== Sources ==
- http://www.dailytimes.com.pk/default.asp?page=2010%5C01%5C13%5Cmain_13-1-2010_pg11
- http://al-huda.al-khoei.org/news/124/ARTICLE/1108/2005-01-01.html
- Article title
- http://www.paklinks.com/gs/all-views/261886-what-in-pakistan-are-you-proud-of-3.html
- http://www.pakpassion.net/ppforum/showthread.php?p=1129729
- http://defenceforumindia.com/china-pakistan-defence/9104-persecution-minorities-pakistan-3.html
