= Mumtazabad =

Mumtazabad ممتاز آباد
- Town
- Location in Pakistan
- Coordinates: 30°11′52″N 71°28′11″E
- Country: Pakistan
- Region: Punjab
- District: Multan District
- Time zone: UTC+5 (PST)

Mumtazabad is one of the oldest housing areas in east Multan in Punjab, Pakistan.

It is Shia majority area of Multan. It is a well-developed and heavily populated area. The layout of the area is symmetrical, with a playground and mosque in every block.

== Notable places ==
=== BCG Chowk ===
Chowk where British Cotton Ginners were located, with their cotton ginning unit in the early 1940s. This is also the location of a Muslim public high school.

Several shops can be found in this area, as well as schools, polytechnics and other educational institutions, a big cellphone market and many food points.

=== Imam Bargah Mumtazabad ===
The Imam bargah is a religious place , located next to the main market.

=== Mian Faisal Mukhtar Park ===
The park is next to Mumtazabad Colony along Vehari Road.

=== New Central Jail ===
Central Jail Multan is the second biggest jail of Punjab and the biggest in southern Punjab. It is situated behind Coca-Cola factory, a kilometer from Vehari Road Multan.

=== Post Office ===
Mumtazabad post office is located in the heart of Mumtazabad market. The post code is 60600.
