= University of Education =

Public university in Lahore, Pakistan

University of Education (UE)
- جامع تعلیم و تربیه (UE)
- Motto in English: Truth, The Ultimate Virtue
- Type: Public
- Established: 2002
- Academic affiliations: HEC
- Chancellor: Governor of Punjab
- Vice-Chancellor: Prof. Dr. Talat Naseer Pasha (SI)
- Registrar: Mr. Ahmad Islam
- Academic staff: 360
- Administrative staff: 394
- Students: ~13,000
- Postgraduates: ~150
- Doctoral students: ~150
- Location: Lahore, Punjab, Pakistan
- Campus: College, residential
- Colours: Green, blue, yellow
- Nickname: UE
- Website: https://ue.edu.pk/

The University of Education (initials: UE), is a public research university whose main campus is located in a residential area of Lahore, Punjab, Pakistan. It is a multi–campus university whose institutions and campuses are located in different metropolitan cities of Punjab province of Pakistan.

Established in 2002, it offers undergraduate, post-graduate and doctoral programmes in various academic disciplines including arts and science. Approximately 13,000 students attend the university. It was ranked as one of the top institutions of higher learning in Pakistan by Higher Education Commission (HEC) in 2010.

== Campuses ==
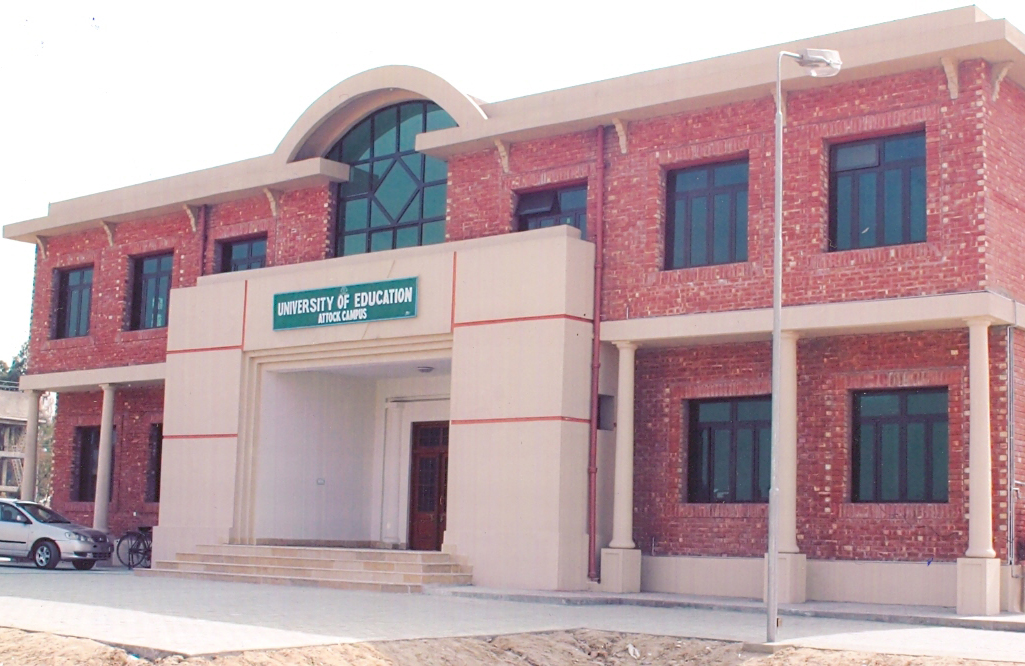
UE Attock campus

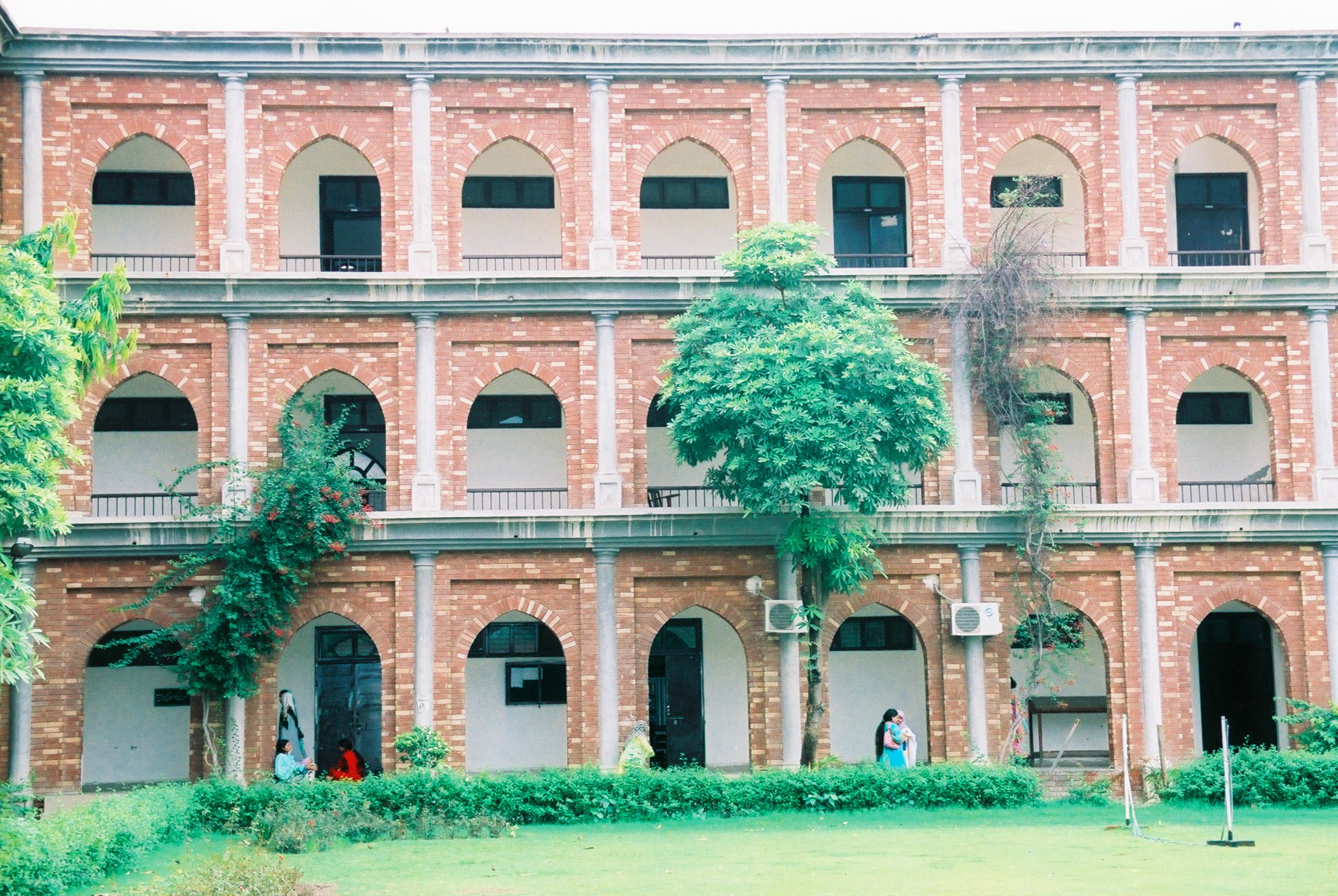
UE Bank Road Lahore Campus

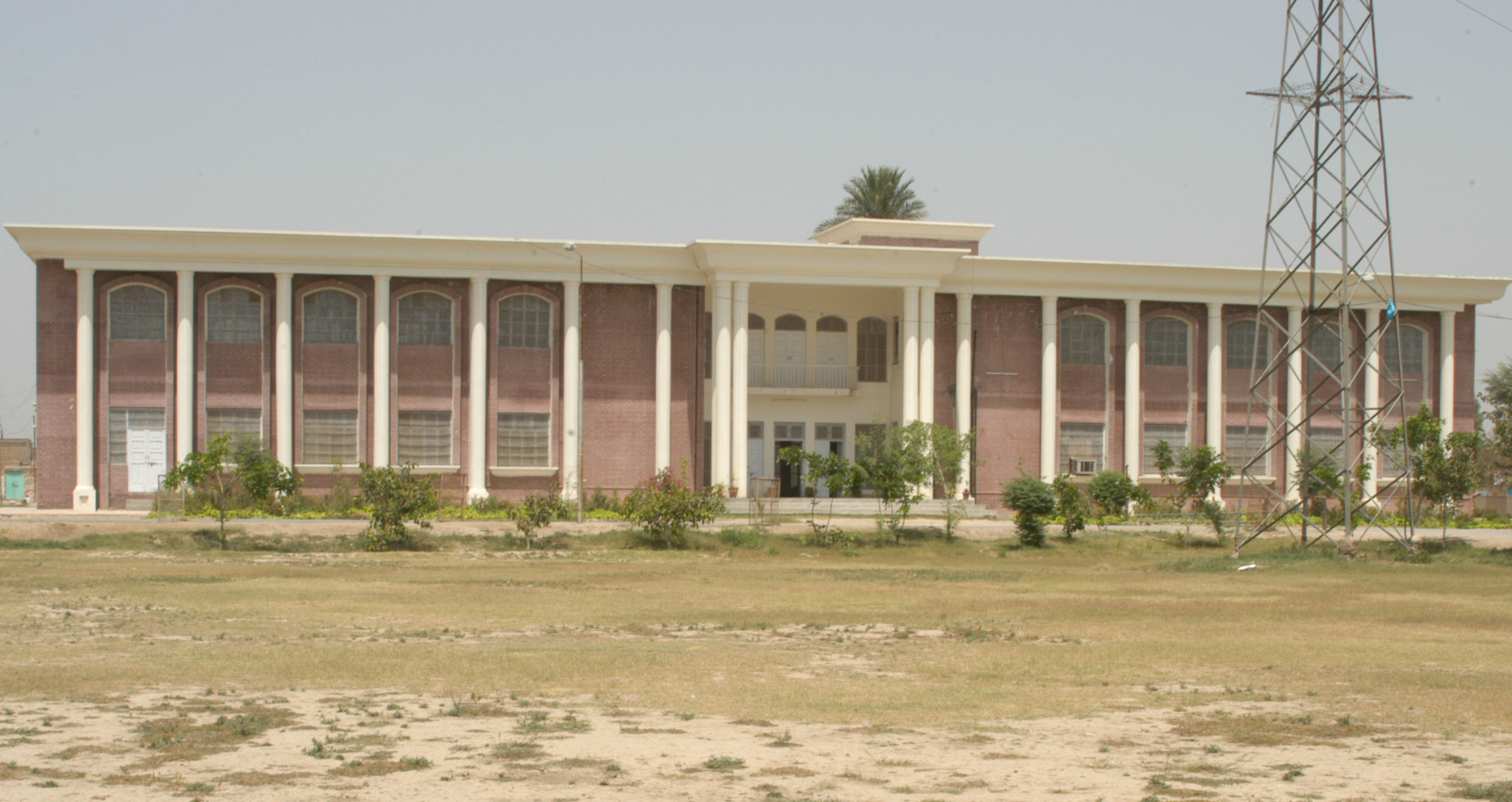
UE DG Khan campus

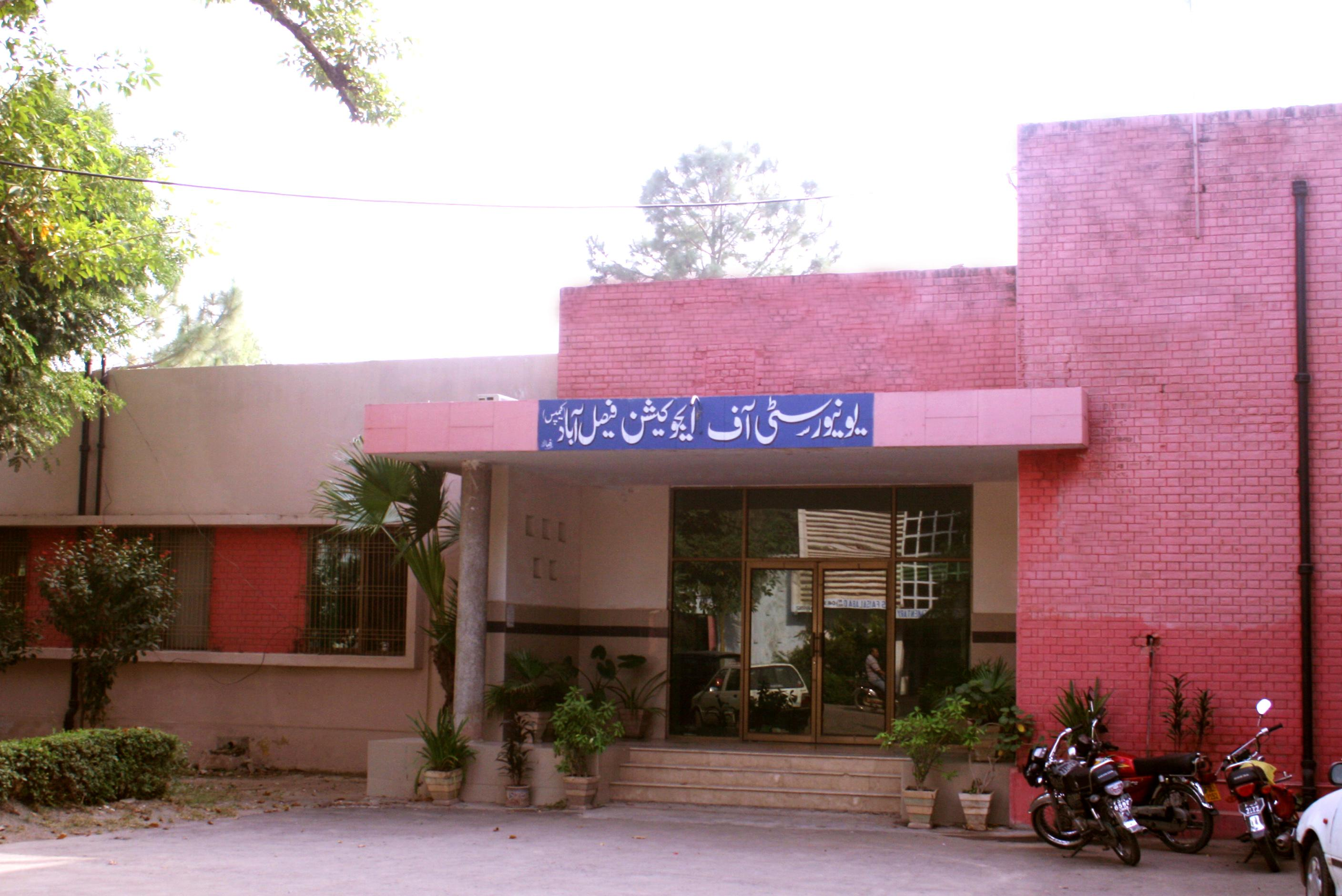
UE Faisalabad campus

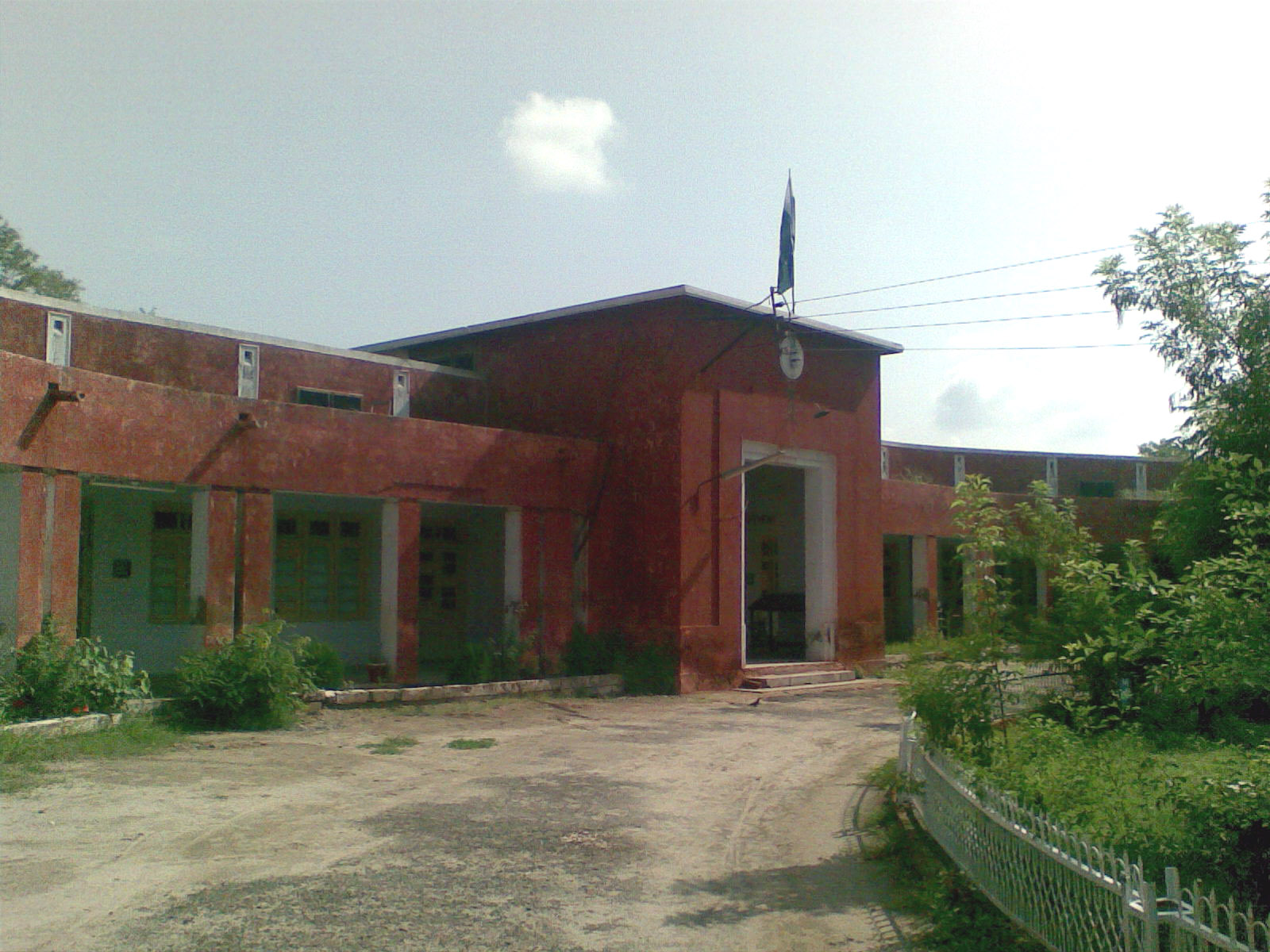
UE Jauharabad campus

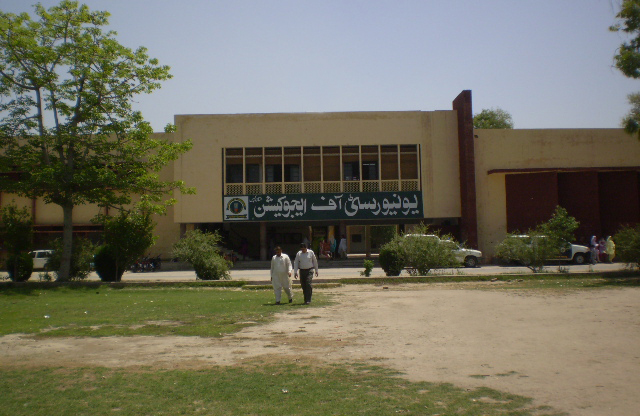
UE Multan campus

=== Lower Mall Campus ===
The university of Education Lower Mall Campus, Lahore came into existence in 1933 in Lahore as a Lady Maclagan Training College for women which later became part of the University of Education in September 2002.

=== Attock campus ===
Soon after the establishment of UE, the Attock Campus introduced a B.Ed program in 2018.

=== Bank Road Campus Lahore ===
The University of Education Bank Road Campus, Lahore, was established in 1933 in the heart of Lahore city as Lady Maclagan Training College. In 1976, the institution was named the Government College of Education for Women, Lahore. In September 2002, with the establishment of the University of Education it became one of its campuses.

=== Dera Ghazi Khan Campus ===
The Government College of Education, D.G Khan was established in 1989.

=== Faisalabad campus ===
The institution was established in 1961. It started in the building of Auqaaf Department on Diji Kot Road. The institution was transferred to the present campus, spread over 23 acres. Faisalabad campus is the biggest campus of University of Education Lahore after Township campus according to departments, among 12 campuses of the university.

=== Jauharabad Campus ===
The institution started as Johar Government Girls School. In November 1971 it obtained the status of Government College for Elementary Teachers and achieved its present status of a University of Education campus in 2004.

=== Vehari Campus ===
The institution started as Government College for Elementary Teachers (W) Vehari in January 1998. This institute mainly focused on teacher education. After the establishment of University of Education, Lahore in August 2002, GCET (W) Vehari was entitled as University College of Education Vehari on June 22, 2005. On September 9, 2006 University College of Education Vehari was granted the status of a Campus of University of Education, Lahore.

=== Multan campus ===
The Government Training College Multan, now one of the campuses of the University of Education Lahore, was established in 1959 but began in Bahawalpur.

U.E Multan Campus was established in 2002. It was located at Bosan Road Multan which is the heart of educational institutions.

== Academic programs ==
=== Bachelor programs ===
- B.Ed. Secondary (1.5 years)
- BBA
- BS Chemistry
- BS Zoology
- BS Mathematics
- BS Information Technology
- BS Botany
- BS Computer Science
- BS Physics
- B.Ed. (Hons)
- BS English
- BS Zoology
- BS Economics and finance
- BS Economics
- BFA
- B.Ed. (Hons) Special Education

=== Master programs ===
- MA Education Leadership and Management
- MA Education
- MSc Mathematics
- MSc Information Technology
- MSc Chemistry
- MA Urdu
- MA English
- MSc Physics
- MA Special Education
- MSc Economics
- MSc Zoology

=== MS/MPhil programs ===
- MPhil Education
- MPhil Urdu
- MPhil English
- MBA 3.5 / 1.5
- MS Mathematics
- MS Physics
- MS Chemistry
- MS Zoology
- MS Botany
- MPhil Educational Leadership and Policy Studies

=== PhD programs ===
- PhD Education
