= Satellite Town, Gujranwala =

Town in Pakistan

- Town

Satellite Town is a town in Gujranwala, Pakistan.
