= St. Thomas' High School, Jhelum =

St. Thomas' High School

Location
- Arsal Town, Jhelum, Punjab; Pakistan
- Coordinates: 32°54′57″N 73°41′15″E

Information
- Type: Private primary and secondary school
- Religious affiliation: Catholicism
- Founded: 1984
- Founder: Sr. Maureen Costelloe; Presentation Sisters
- Oversight: Catholic Board of Education
- Principal: Mubarik Bashir
- Age: 5 to 16
- Affiliations: Roman Catholic Archdiocese of Lahore

St. Thomas' High School is a private Catholic primary and secondary school, located in Jhelum, a city in the Jhelum District of the Punjab province of Pakistan.

== History ==
It was founded by Sr. Maureen Costelloe of the Presentation Sisters under the Roman Catholic Archdiocese of Lahore in 1984. It started as a boys' school but is now co-educational with a girls' section and a boys' section. It provides education up to matriculation standard. The principal in 2008 was Sr. Riffat.

The Presentation Convent School, Jhelum was set up in 1950. Sr. Maureen saw the need for a senior school for Christian boys as the boys from Presentation Primary School had nowhere to go when they finished class 5. For this purpose St. Thomas' High School was built.

== See also ==
- Christianity in Pakistan
- Education in Pakistan
- List of educational institutions in Jhelum
