= Government College Gujranwala =

College in Punjab, Pakistan

Govt. College Gujranwala
- گورنمنٹ کالج گوجرانوالہ
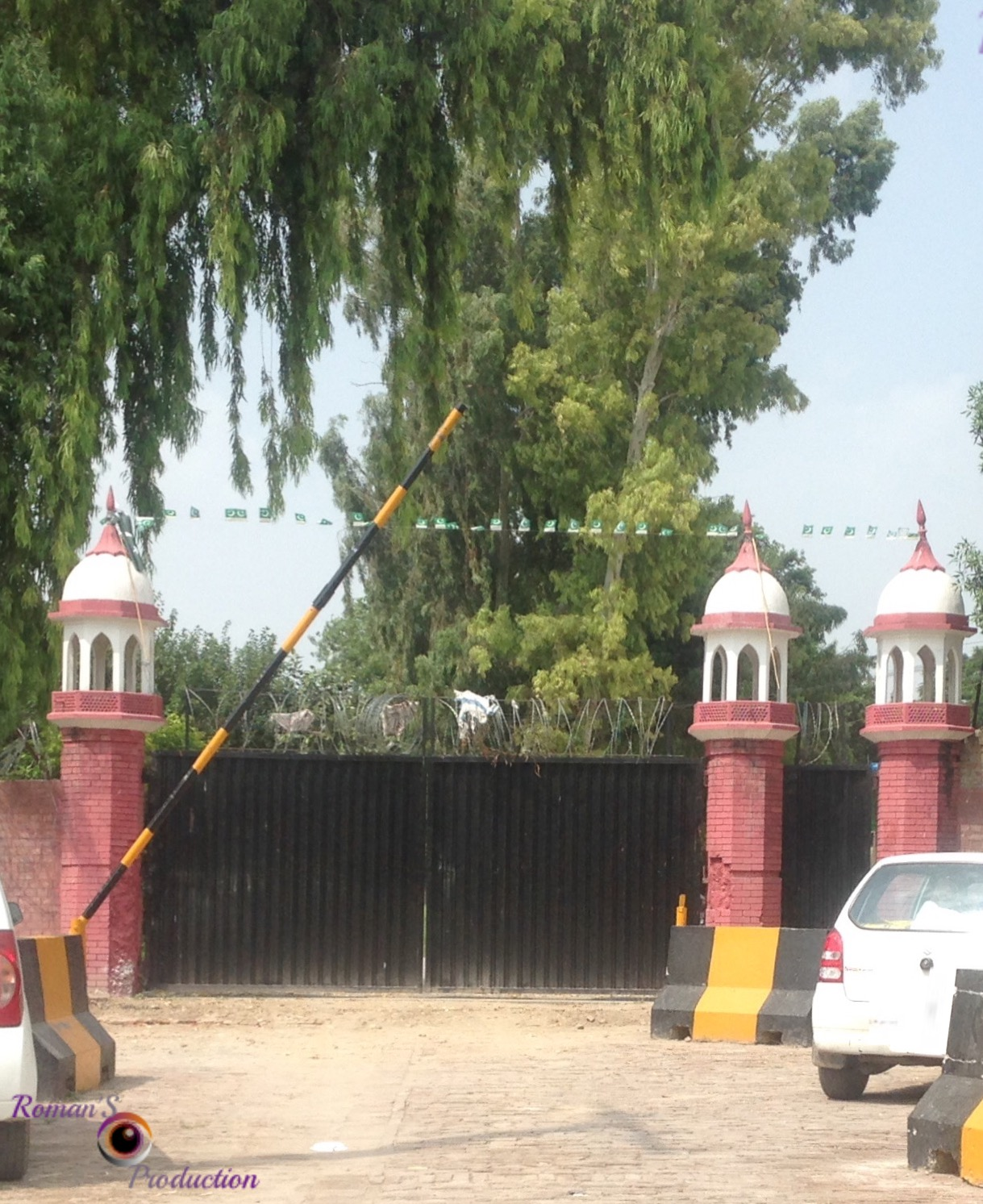
- Main gate of college
- Other names: GCG/Government College
- Motto: ایمان ، اتحاد ، تنظیم (Iman, Ittehad, Tanzeem)
- Motto in English: Faith, Unity, Discipline
- Type: Public
- Established: 1 March 1955
- Affiliations: Board of Intermediate and Secondary Education, Gujranwala; University of the Punjab
- Academic staff: 145
- Location: Gujranwala, Punjab, Pakistan
- Campus: Urban
- Colours: White, grey, and maroon

Government College Gujranwala (گورنمنٹ کالج گوجرانوالہ) alias Government Postgraduate College for Boys Satellite Town Gujranwala is one of the oldest educational institution of Gujranwala. The foundation stone was laid by Education Adviser of Government of Pakistan, S.M.Sharif on 1 March 1955.

It is situated on Pasrur Road, Gujranwala and it's adjacent to Satellite Town of Gujranwala.

== Academics ==
There are 22 working departments in college. The college is offering degrees with the affiliation of Punjab University in 11 subjects:

- BS (Hons) English
- BS (Hons) Physics
- BS (Hons) Chemistry
- BS (Hons) Mathematics
- BS (Hons) Social Work
- BS (Hons) Information Technology
- BS (Hons) Economics
- BS (Hons) Commerce
- BS (Hons) Statistics
- BS (Hons) Zoology
- BS (Hons) Botany

and 5 Higher Secondary School Certificates with affiliation of BISE GRW including:

- Fsc (Pre-Medical)
- Fsc (Pre-Engineering)
- ICs
- ICom
- FA
