= University of the Punjab, Jhelum =

Public research university in Pakistan

- Type: Public
- Established: 2012
- Affiliations: University of the Punjab, Lahore, Higher Education Commission (Pakistan)
- Director: Dr Ishfaq Ahmed
- Location: Jhelum, Punjab, Pakistan
- Website: pujc.edu.pk

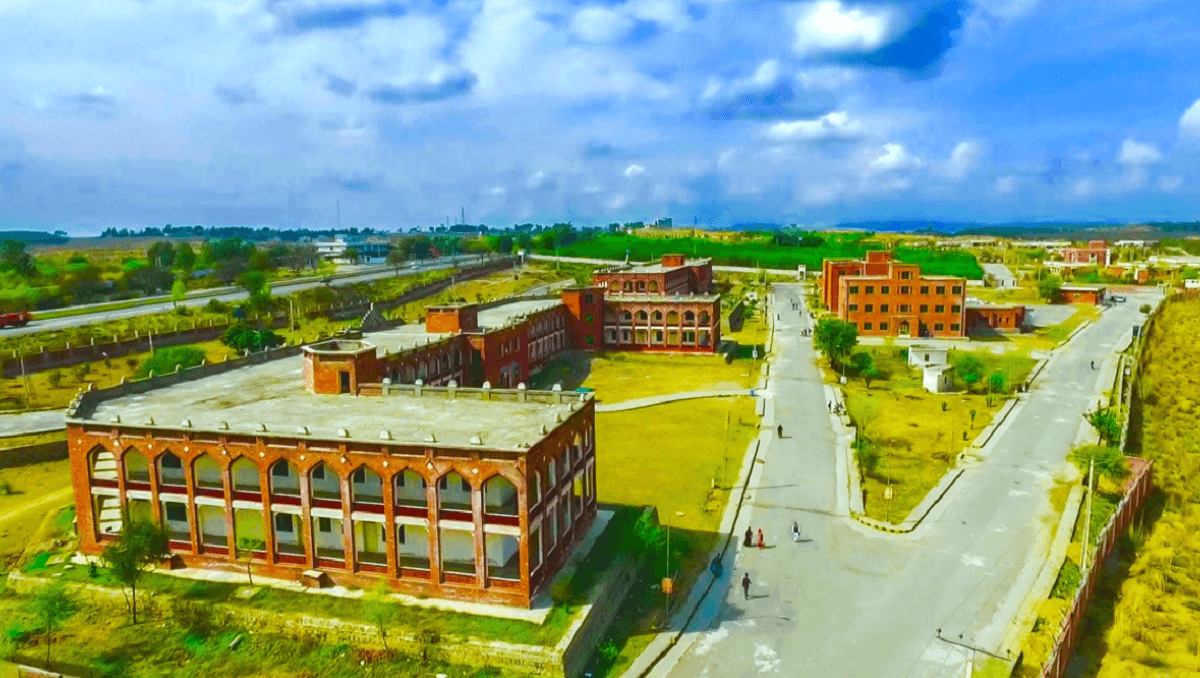
Aerial view of University of the Punjab, Jhelum Campus

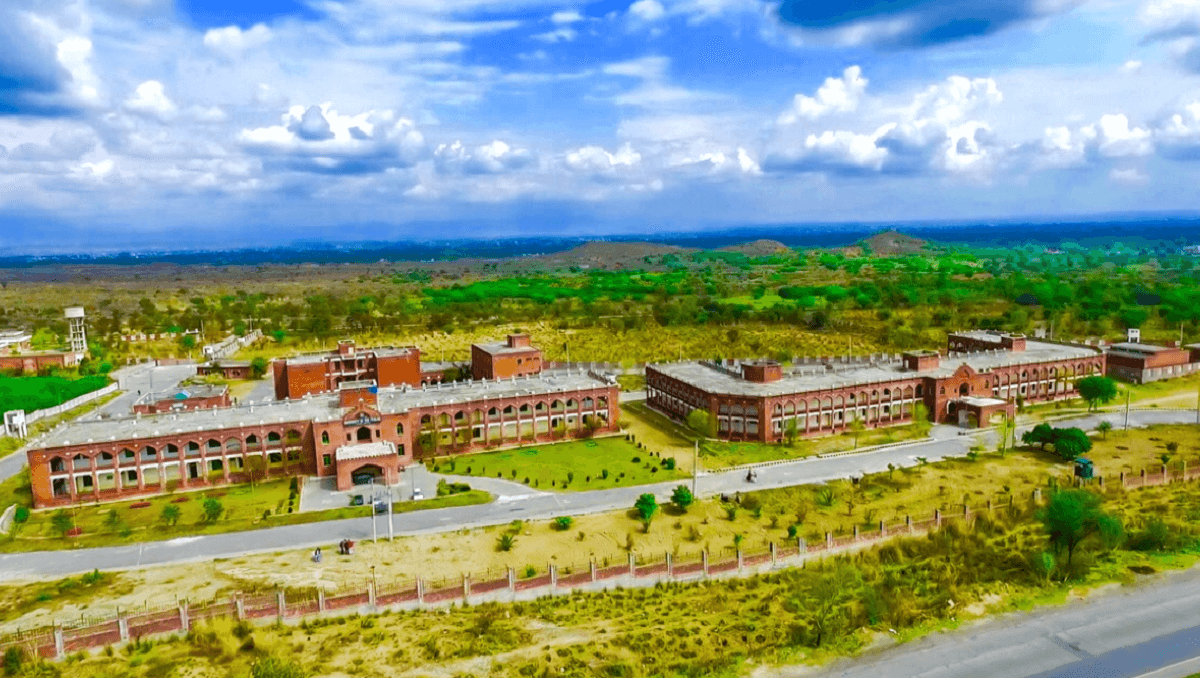
University of the Punjab, Jhelum Campus

The University of the Punjab, Jhelum Campus (UoPJC), also referred to as the Punjab University, Jhelum Campus (PUJC), is a sub-campus of the University of the Punjab located in Jhelum, Punjab, Pakistan. It was established in 2012 and the campus is recognized by the Higher Education Commission of Pakistan.

== Departments ==
- Department of Administrative Sciences
- Department of Business Administration
- Department of Commerce
- Department of Information Technology
- Department of Law
