= Muhammad Sharif (cosmologist) =

Muhammad Sharif (محمد شريف)
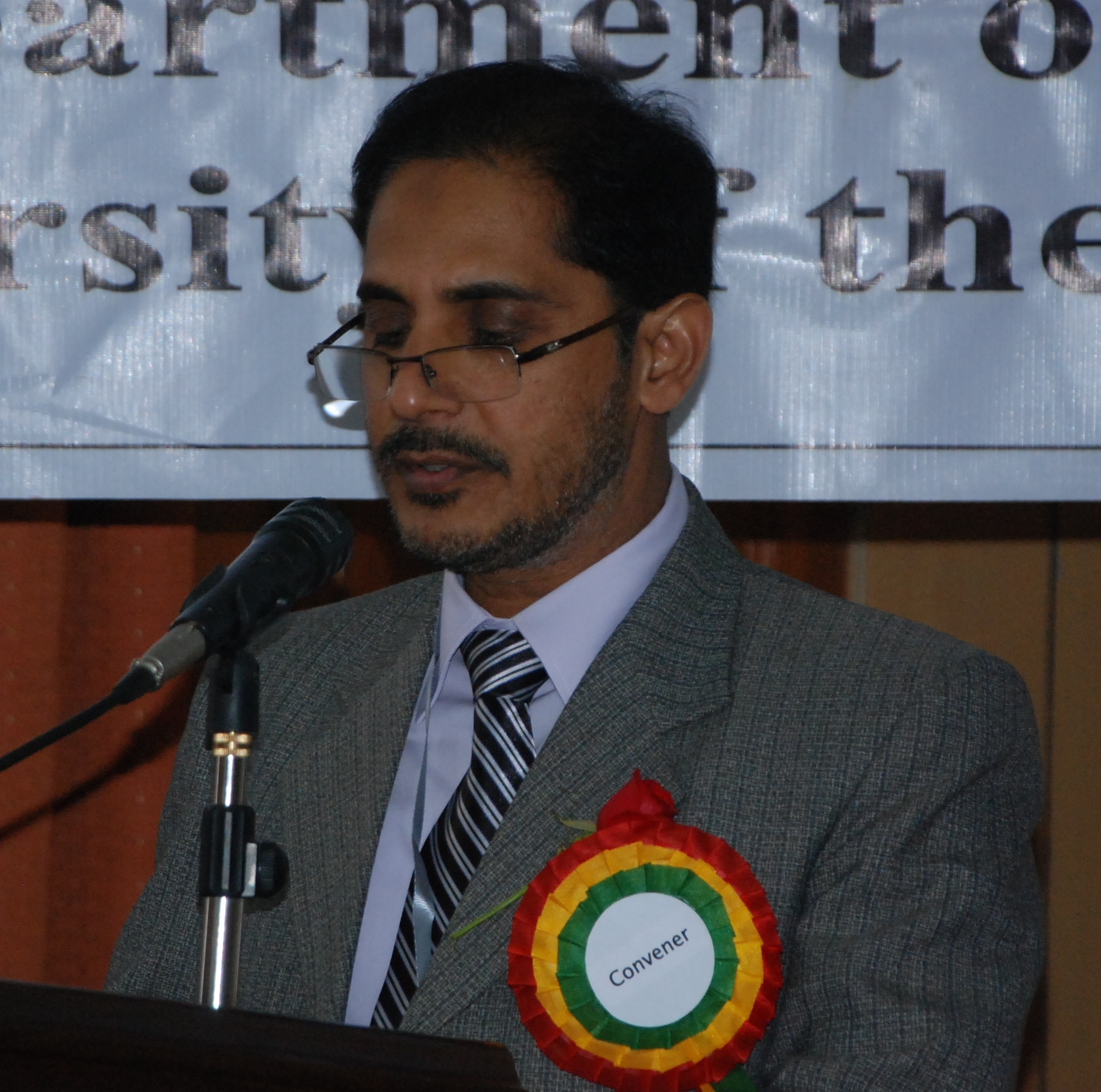
- Muhammad Sharif is addressing in a conference (2011).
- Born: 15 June 1962 (age 64); Shujabad, Multan, Pakistan
- Citizenship: Pakistan
- Education: Quaid-i-Azam University
- Known for: Cosmology, Gravitational theories, General relativity, Mathematical sciences, Relativity
- Awards: Izaz-i-Fazeelat (2007), Tamgha-e-Imtiaz (2008), Distinguished National Professor (2010)
- Scientific career
- Fields: Mathematics
- Workplaces: University of the Punjab
- Doctoral advisor: Asghar Qadir

Muhammad Sharif (cosmologist) (Urdu: محمد شريف) (15 June 1962), TI, FPAS, is a Pakistani professor, specialised in mathematical physics and cosmology. He worked as the chairman of the department of Mathematics, University of the Punjab (PU), Lahore for six years, i.e., from 2013 to 2019. Sharif served as a Dean, Faculty of Science at University of the Punjab from 2019 to 2021. Now, Sharif is an HOD, Department of Mathematics and Statistics, The University of Lahore. He is a Higher Education Commission (HEC) Distinguished National Professor. He has been awarded with the Izaz-Fazeelat and Tamgha-i-Imtiaz by the government of Pakistan.

== Biography ==
Sharif's father earned his living through agriculture.

After graduating from The Islamia University of Bahawalpur, Sharif proceeded to join Quaid-e-Azam University (QAU), initially focusing to become a good mathematician. In this respect, Sharif was enrolled at QAU in Islamabad where he excelled in courses of mathematics and physics and received MSc Mathematics in 1985.

In the same year, Sharif pursued his M.Phil applied Mathematics, followed by PhD in Mathematical physics under the supervision of Asghar Qadir. He obtained PhD degree in 1991.

== Education and career ==
Sharif completed a postdoctoral Fellowship in South Korea and another in the UK.

Sharif has participated and attended more than 133 International and National workshops and conferences in his field. He has published more than 713 research papers and his work has been cited more than 18500 times by national and international researchers. He had organised an International Conference on Relativistic Astrophysics in University of the Punjab, Lahore-Pakistan during 10–14 February 2015, in which people from all over the world had participated. The aim of this conference is to celebrate 100 years of Einstein's theory of general relativity.

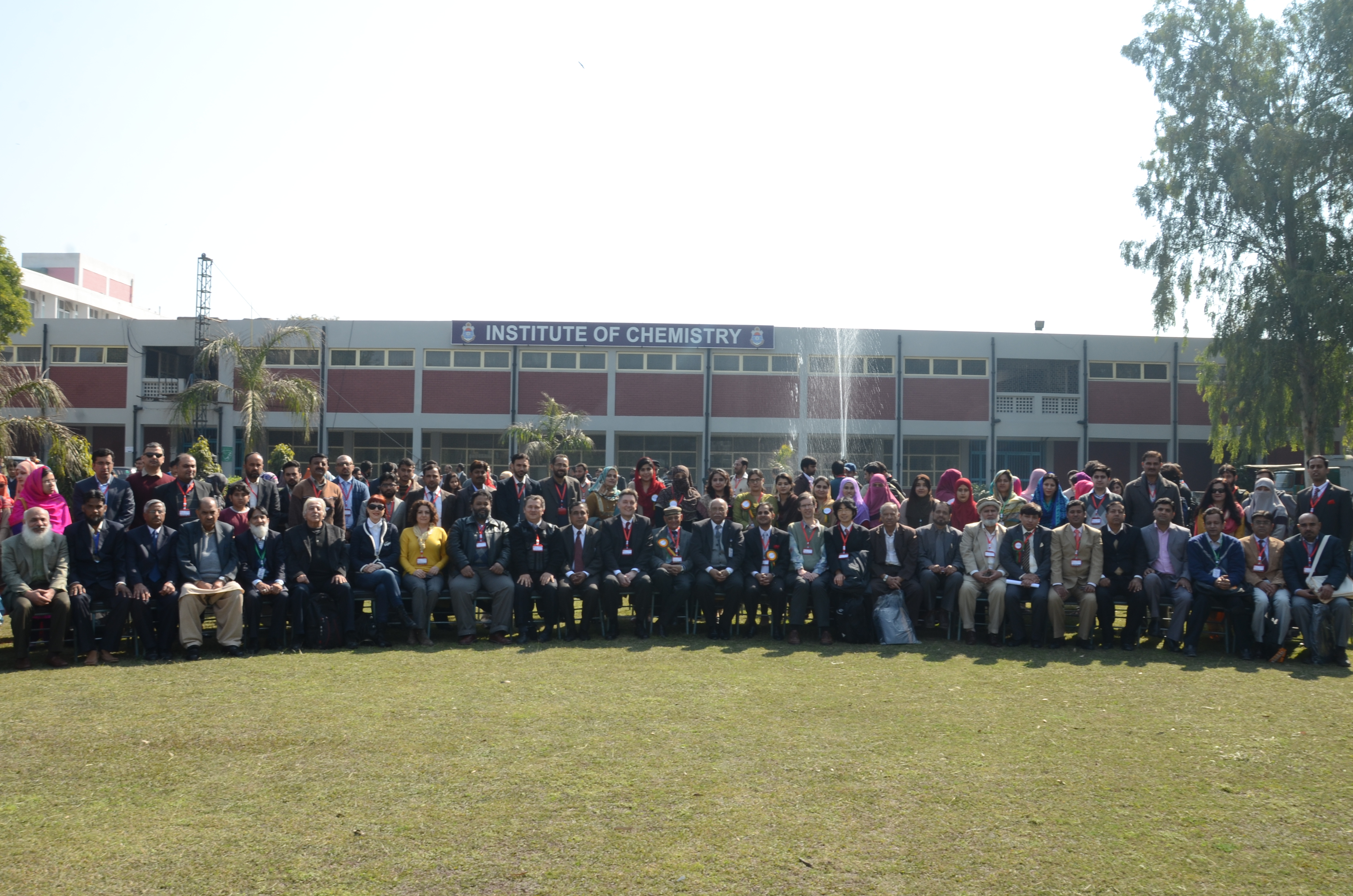
Group Photo: International Conference on Relativistic Astrophysics, 10–14 February 2015.

Sharif made painstaking efforts to spread awareness among Pakistani young students about writing good quality research papers in the field of relativity and cosmology. Dr. Zeeshan Yousaf and Dr. Muhammad Zaeem Ul Haq Bhatti are among his pioneers students.

== Awards and fellowships ==
- Post-Doctoral Fellowship awarded by Korea Science and Engineering Foundation (KOSEF) (2000).
- Research Productivity Allowance (2001–2008) awarded by Pakistan Council of Science and Technology(PCST).
- Tamgha-e-Imtiaz awarded by Government of Pakistan (23 March 2008).
- Best Research Paper Award awarded by Higher Education Commission (17 December 2009).
- Pakistan Academy of Sciences Gold Medal awarded by Pakistan Academy of Sciences (22 December 2009).
- Best Research Paper Award awarded by Higher Education Commission (March 2015).

== Selected research papers ==
- General formula for the momentum imparted to test particles in arbitrary spacetimes (1992) by A. Qadir and M. Sharif
- Matter collineations of spacetime homogeneous Gödel-type metrics (2003) by U. Camci and M. Sharif.
- Matter Inheritance Symmetries of Spherically Symmetric Static Spacetimes (2005) by M. Sharif
- Isothermal Plasma Waves in Gravitomagnetic Planar Analogue (2007) by M. Sharif and U. Sheikh.
- Cosmological evolution for dark energy models in f(T) gravity (2012) by M. Sharif and S. Azeem.
- Dynamical instability of the charged expansion-free spherical collapse in gravity (2012) by M Sharif and Z. Yousaf
