= Niaz Ahmad Akhtar =

Pakistani academic

- نیاز احمد اختر
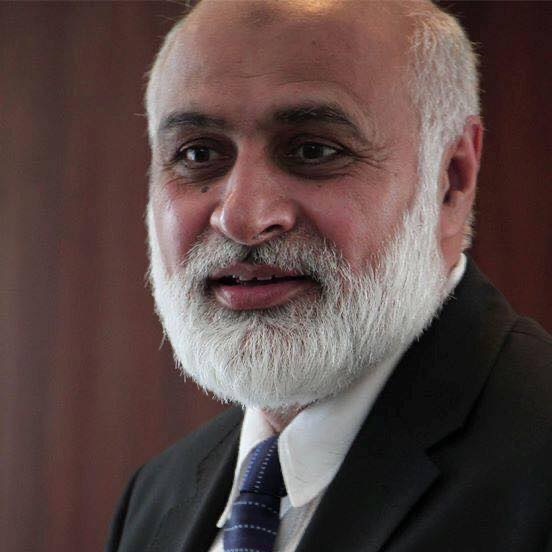
- Niaz Ahmad Akhtar in January 2020

Chairman, Higher Education Commission of Pakistan
- Incumbent
- Assumed office February 6, 2026

Vice-Chancellor Quaid-i-Azam University Islamabad
- In office March 14, 2023 – February 6, 2026

Vice-Chairman (Punjab), Pakistan Engineering Council
- In office September 2021 – August 2024

Vice-Chancellor University of the Punjab Lahore
- In office June 2018 – June 2022

Vice-Chancellor University of Engineering and Technology, Taxila
- In office December 2014 – June 2018

Rector National Textile University Faisalabad
- In office August 2010 – December 2014

Personal details
- Born: 15 June 1960 (age 66) Dera Ghazi Khan, Punjab, Pakistan
- Children: Muhamamd Hussain Jaffar; Sohaib Abdul Rehman; Khubaib Abdul Malik; Mohammad Musaab Jaffar
- Education: University of the Punjab; University of Leeds
- Profession: Chemical Engineer
- Awards: Sitara-i-Imtiaz (2015)
- Website: www.drniazahmad.com

Niaz Ahmad Akhtar (Urdu: نیاز احمد اختر; born 15 June 1960) is a Pakistani academic who is currently serving as the chairman of the Higher Education of Pakistan. He is also a professor emeritus at the University of the Punjab.

Previously he has been vice-chancellor of Quaid-i-Azam University, University of the Punjab, University of Engineering and Technology, Taxila, University of Sahiwal,, Information Technology University, Lahore and the rector of the National Textile University, Faisalabad. He was also the vice-chairman of the Pakistan Engineering Council from Punjab for 3 years term (2021-2024).

In recognition of his outstanding performance in the field of Education (Engineering & Technology), he was awarded Sitara-i-Imtiaz by the Government of Pakistan in 2015.

== Early life and education ==
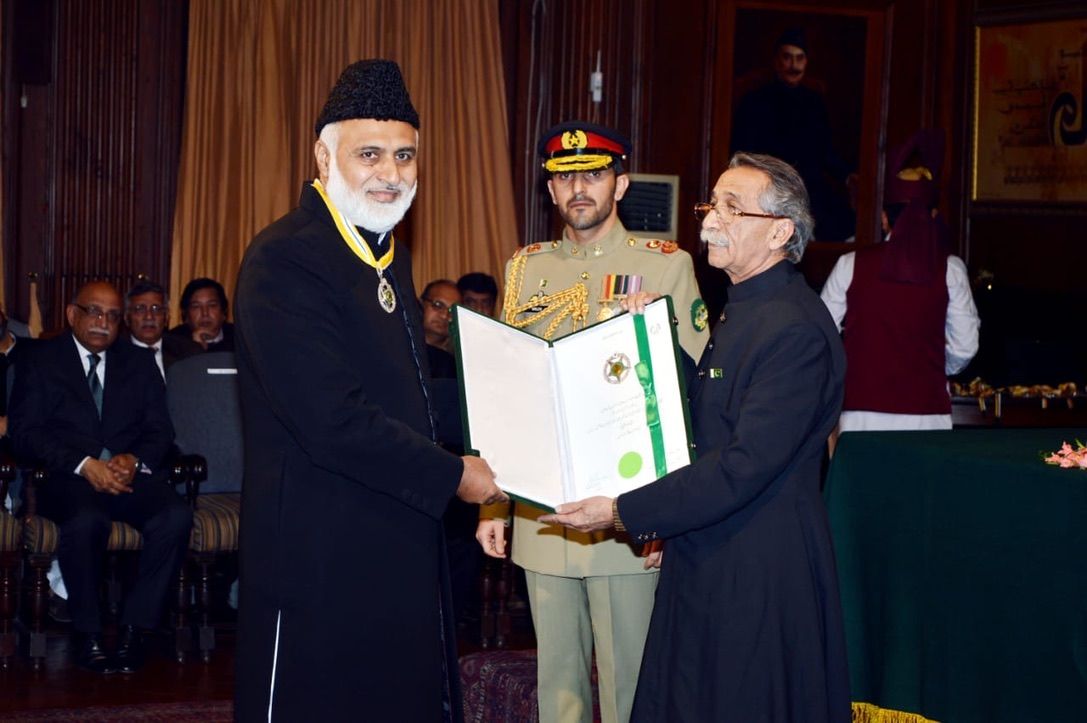
Niaz Ahmad Akhtar, receiving Sitara-i-Imtiaz at the Governor House, Lahore, Pakistan

Akhtar was born on 15 June 1960 in Basti Dosa, Dera Ghazi Khan. He has an undergraduate and a master's degree in chemical engineering from the University of the Punjab, Lahore. He did his doctorate in chemical engineering from the University of Leeds, UK in 1995.

== Career ==
=== Early career at the University of the Punjab ===
Akhtar began his teaching career at the University of the Punjab as a lecturer in chemical engineering in 1988. In 1995, he went to Bahrain and became the senior lecturer and head of chemical engineering discipline at the Bahrain Training Institute. He came back to serve his country in 2001 and joined as an associate professor at the Institute of Chemical Engineering & Technology, University of the Punjab. In 2004, he became a professor at the University of the Punjab, Lahore and served in this capacity until 2009. In 2002, Akhtar established Quality Management Division under the Institute of Chemical Engineering & Technology.

This Division was upgraded to Institute of Quality & Technology Management in 2004 and Akhtar was appointed as the founding director of this institute. The institute is presently offering BS, MS, & PhD degree in field of Industrial Engineering & Quality Management. Akhtar has also served as Founder Director of the Quality Enhancement Cell (QEC) and the Director Student Affairs at the University of the Punjab.

For the first time in Pakistan, he launched MSc, MS and PhD programs in the field of Total Quality Management.

=== Vice-chancellor at the University of the Punjab ===
Akhtar served as the Vice-Chancellor of the University of the Punjab from 2018 to 2022. Under his leadership the university witnessed the most progressive years in its history. The most notable improvement was the continuous advancement in the international ranking of the university. Despite being one of the oldest and the largest university of the country, the University of the Punjab appeared in the international ranking for the first time in 2018 under the leadership of Akhtar. Among the top 78% universities of the world in 2018, the university improved by ~5% per year, reaching the top 57% universities of the world in 2022.

Akhtar made efforts to restructure the academic organization of the university. The initial 13 faculties and 83 teaching departments were modified to 19 Faculties and 146 departments, centers, institutes, colleges and schools.

Under the leadership of Akhtar, the university launched new program/courses at the bachelors, masters and PhD level. The courses like neuroscience, optics & photonics, social policy and social entrepreneurship were offered for the first time in Pakistan. Akhtar also significantly increased the research funding of the university to reform the research output.

Akhtar also took several other steps for the development of the university, including implementation of online teaching and research during the COVID-19 pandemic. University of the Punjab was the first national university to make such a transition to minimize the academic interruption for students.

=== Rector at the National Textile University ===
As the Rector of National Textile University, he created four new faculties and ten new departments, growing the number of students by three times, faculty strength by four times and revenue of the university by five times.

=== Vice-chancellor at the University of Engineering and Technology (UET), Taxila ===
In 2014, he became the Vice Chancellor of the University of Engineering & Technology, Taxila. In addition to increasing the number of students and faculty, he started many new programs including 12 new BS, MS and Ph.D. programs. He established new centers including Technology Incubation Center, Staff Development Center, E-Rozgaar Center and Social Entrepreneurship Center. He established Departments of Computer Sciences, Electronics Engineering, Environmental Engineering, Industrial Engineering and Basic Sciences in a state-of-art new Academic Block. He was also instrumental in getting approved of the University Statues in 2017. Owing to his significant contributions, he was decorated with the National Award of Sitara-e-Imtiaz in 2015, in the Field of Education (Engineering & Technology). Akhtar has helped start new programs at Information Technology University.

=== Vice-chancellor at the University of Sahiwal ===
In 2021, Akhtar was assigned the additional charge of the University of Sahiwal (UoS) for a period of three months or until a regular appointment was made. He established new faculties at the university and modified various existing ones. He also established the online admission portal for the first time in the history of the university. He took steps to promote research culture at the university, developed national and international linkages, and improved the transport facilities at the university.

=== Vice-chancellor at Quaid-i-Azam University ===
Akhtar was appointed vice-chancellor of Quaid-i-Azam University for a period of four years on 10 March 2023. He assumed his role on 14 March 2023.

=== Vice-chairman of the Pakistan Engineering Council (PEC) ===
Akhtar served as Vice-Chairman (Punjab) of the Pakistan Engineering Council (PEC) for over 9 years.

== Research ==
Akhtar has published/edited four books on "Quality Assurance in Higher Education". He has published research articles in high impact journals. He served as the Chief Editor of the Journal of Quality & Innovation (2005-2017) and Member Advisory Board, Journal of Quality Assurance in Education (Emerald Journal).

== Awards ==
- Institution of Engineers Pakistan, National Award of Excellence - (2008, 2009 & 2015)
- Best Research Paper, Award by HEC - (2012)
- Sitara-i-Imtiaz, Government of Pakistan - (2015)
- Outstanding Performance Award of Gold Medal from the BOG of National Textile University - (2015)
- Pakistan Institute of Chemical Engineers, Gold Medal - (2016)
- Pakistan Engineering Council, Gold Medal - (2017)

== Books published/edited ==
- Quality Assurance in Higher Education, A Global Perspective edited by Abdul Raouf and Niaz Ahmad published by Higher Education Commission, 2008.
- Quality in Higher Education: Challenges and Practices Abdul Raouf, Riaz Hussain Qureshi and Niaz Ahmad published by Punjab University, 2009.
- Higher Education Quality "Assurance and Assessment" edited by Abdul Raouf, Niaz Ahmad and Usman Awan published by Punjab University, 2011.
- Emissions from Circulating Fluidized Bed by Lambert Academic Publishing, Germany, ISBN 978-3-659-48358-5 K. Shahzad, N.A. Akhtar

== Also See ==
- Quaid-i-Azam University Islamabad
- University of the Punjab
- National Textile University Faisalabad
