= GIFT University =

Private university in Gujranwala,Punjab,Pakistan

- گفٹ یونیورسٹی
- Other name: GIFT
- Former name: Gujranwala Institute of Future Technology
- Motto in English: Converting Knowledge into Practical Experience
- Type: Private
- Established: 2002
- Accreditation: Higher Education Commission (Pakistan); Pakistan Engineering Council
- Chairman: Muhammad Anwar Dar
- Chancellor: Governor of Punjab, Pakistan
- Vice-Chancellor: Prof. Dr. Nabeel Amin
- Dean: Dr. Muhammad Ziad Nayyer Dar, Dr. Muhammad Asir Ajmal, Dr. Muhammad Kashif Saeed
- Students: 8000+
- Location: Gujranwala, Punjab, Pakistan
- Colors: Blue, orange and grey
- Mascot: GIFTonian
- Website: gift.edu.pk

The GIFT University, also known as Gujranwala Institute of Future Technologies, is a private university located in Gujranwala, Punjab, Pakistan. It is in Gujranwala region, offering multiple degree programs ranging from undergraduate to doctorate.They also offer wide range of transport networks in surrounding areas for example Wazirabad,Sialkot,Muridke,Pasrur and Hafizabad etc

== History ==
It was established in 2002 as Gujranwala Institute of Future Technology. The university offers degree programs in various fields such as business administration, accounting and finance, psychology, mass communication, education, economics, computer science, , software engineering, electrical engineering, home economics, textile and fashion design and English language and literature etc.

== Offices ==
Office	Head
Academic Operations Department	Mian Nouman
Account Office	Numan Ihsan
Examinations Department	Muhammad Arif Khokhar
Information Technology Department	Hafiz Tariq Aziz
Registrar Office	Waseem Ullah Dar
Marketing Department	Faizan Arshad
SDC - Student Development Center	Mariam Sohail
SFC - Student Facilitation Center	Umara Qaisar
Transport Department	Naeem Akbar
Library	Beenish
Human Resources Department	Muqaddas Firdous
CCAD - Center for Community Awareness and Development	Mohsin Shams
FDD - Faculty Development Department	Dr. Ayesha Rafique
ORIC	Dr. Sheharyar Durani
QEC - Quality Enhancement Cell	Awais Umar Nawaz
Security & Services	Major Sajid Mahmood
Student Societies Secretariat	Sherjeel Adil
Technical Services	Naeem Akbar
