= University of the Punjab =

Public research university in Lahore, Pakistan

Coordinates: 31°17′34″N 74°10′29″E

- جامع پنجاب
- Coat of arms
- Other name: Punjab University
- Motto: ایمان، اتحاد، تنظیم (Aiman, Ittehad, Tanzeem)
- Motto in English: Faith, Education, Discipline
- Type: Public research university
- Established: 14 October 1882; 144 years ago
- Founder: Gottlieb Wilhelm Leitner
- Academic affiliations: List: Pakistan Engineering Council; Pharmacy Council of Pakistan; Pakistan Bar Council; Pakistan Council for Architects and Town Planners; Association of Commonwealth Universities of the United Kingdom
- Chancellor: Governor of the Punjab
- Vice-Chancellor: Muhammad Ali
- Faculty: 1006 full time and 300 part time faculty members
- Students: 45,678 on campus students. (27,907 morning students, 16,552 evening students and 1,219 diploma students), 363,416 (off campus)
- Location: Canal Road, Quaid-e-Azam Campus, Lahore, Punjab, Pakistan
- Campus: List; Main Quaid-e-Azam "New" Campus – Established 1958, 1,781 acres (721 hectares); Satellite Allama Iqbal "Old" Campus – Established 1882, 50 acres (20 hectares); Khanaspur Campus – Established 1964, 2.47 acres (1.00 hectare); Gujranwala Campus – Established 2006, 10 acres (4.0 hectares); Jhelum Campus – Established 2011, 32 acres (13 hectares); Pothohar Campus – Established 2023, 100 acres (40 hectares), Gujar Khan
- Colours: Blue – Bronze – Red
- Nickname: Pioneers
- Website: pu.edu.pk
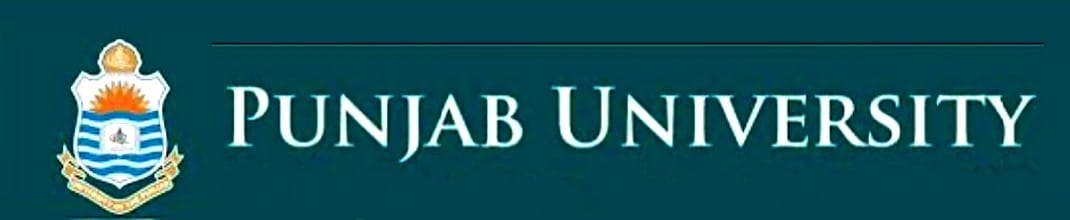

The University of the Punjab (PU) is a public research university in Lahore, Punjab, Pakistan. Founded in 1882, it was one of the first universities created by the British government in the British Raj.

The first meeting of the University's Senate was on 14 October 1882 at Shimla (then Simla), which marked the formal establishment of the university. Punjab University was the fourth university to be established by the British colonial authorities in the British Raj; the first three universities were established in other parts of the British Raj.

There are 45,678 students (27,907 morning students, 16,552 evening students and 1,219 diploma students). The university has 19 faculties, of which there are 138 academic departments, research centres, and institutes. Punjab University has ranked first among large-sized multiple faculty universities by the HEC in 2012. There are two Nobel Laureates among the university's alumni and former staff. The university is also a member of the Association of Commonwealth Universities of the United Kingdom. The university has satellite campuses in Gujranwala, Jhelum, Khanaspur, and Pothohar.

== History ==
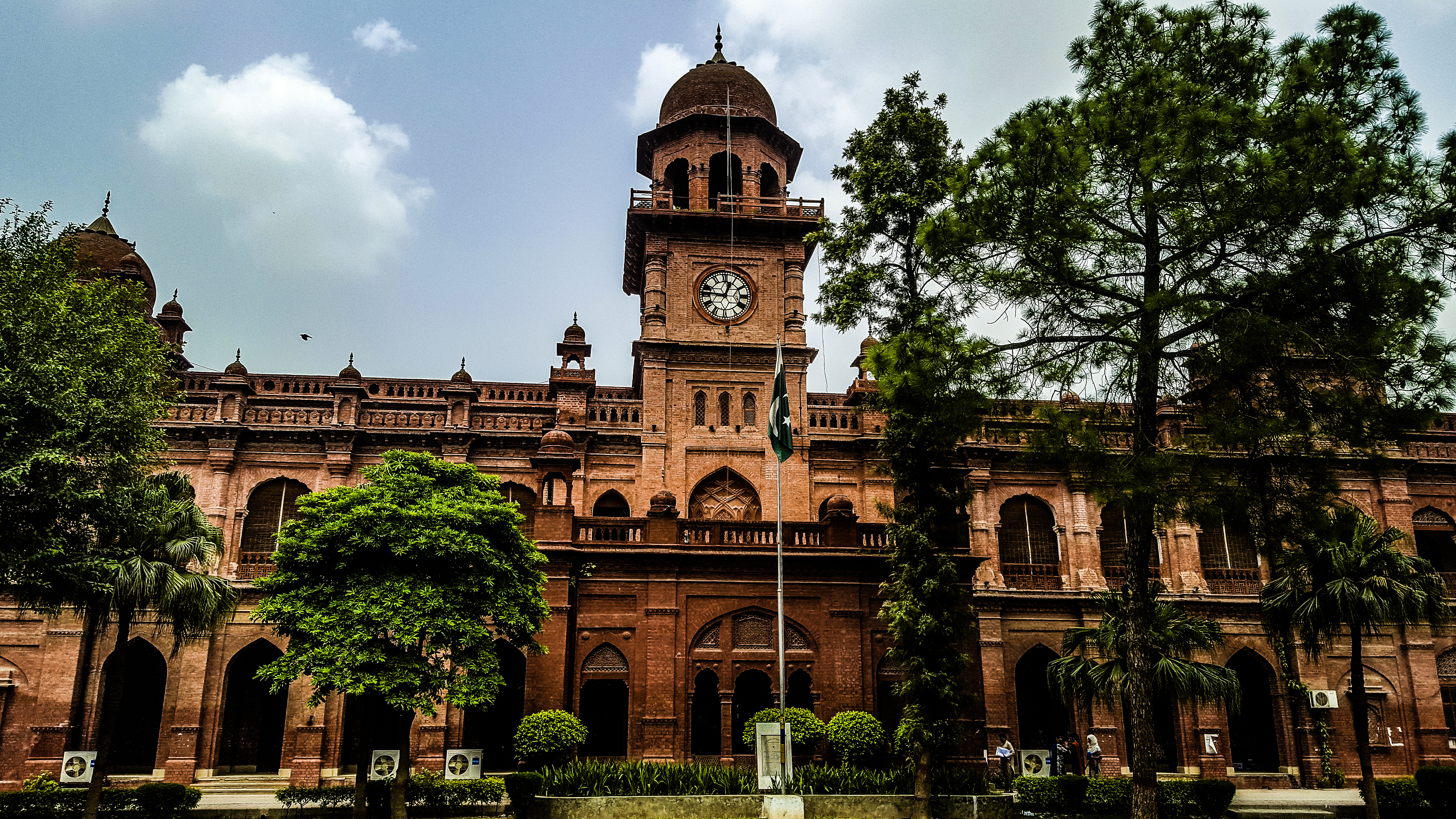
University of the Punjab, Lahore

The University of Punjab was given its initial impetus in 1854 by Wood's despatch. The Institute of Administrative Sciences was created in 1962. Many major institutions that were previously affiliated to the university have become independent universities, such as Government College University, Lahore and Medical and Engineering Colleges.

=== Pre Partition ===
On 1 January 1864, Government College, Lahore, (now Government College University, Lahore) was established. The Lieutenant Governor of Punjab Donald Friell McLeod appointed Gottlieb Wilhelm Leitner as principal of Government College Lahore (now Government College University, Lahore). On 12 March 1868, a resolution was adopted at a public meeting in Lahore to establish University of the Punjab at Lahore. On 8 December 1869, Punjab University College was established in Lahore and on 14 October 1882, University of the Punjab was established.

Prof. Arthur Compton, who discovered Compton effect used to be an appointed lecturer in the university. He received the Nobel Prize in 1927.

=== Founding Colleges ===
After the resolution of 12 March (1868), in 1869 Punjab University College was established, consisting of Punjab University Law College and Oriental College, which are still the oldest departments and founding constituent colleges of Punjab University. Government College University was also made a part of University of the Punjab which was later separated and became an independent university in 2002.

=== Post Partition ===
The fate of the university after the partition of India in 1947, was deliberated at the Punjab Partition Committee, with representatives from East Punjab advocating for a division of the university. The senate of the university voted to split the university, and the matter reached the Partition Council at the centre, but a decision could not be made. The government in East Punjab was compelled to establish a new university, which eventually became the Panjab University in Chandigarh.

== Campus ==
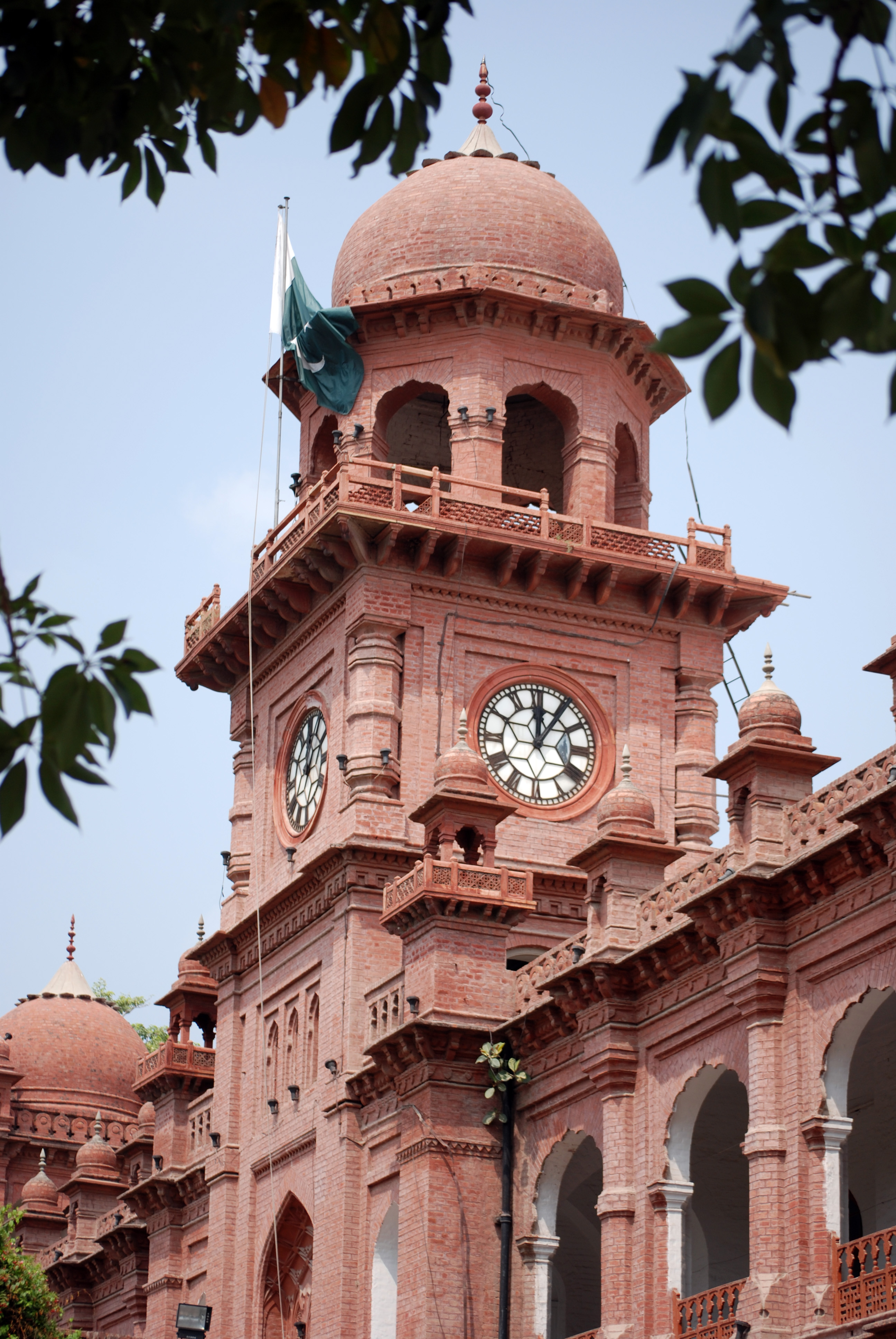
Allama Iqbal Campus in Lahore

The university is divided into campuses across Punjab with one summer campus located in Khyber Pakhtunkhwa:

- Allama Iqbal Campus: also known as the old campus, located in the centre of Lahore, it is named after the South Asian thinker and mystic poet Allama Muhammad Iqbal. The campus houses the Senate, the Syndicate, the Selection Board and the Advanced Studies & Research Board are generally held there.
Location in Lahore (Quaid-i-Azam Campus)
- Quaid-i-Azam Campus: also known as the new campus, is named after the founder of Pakistan and is located 12 kilometres (7.5 mi) to the south of the Allama Iqbal Campus. Spread over an area of 7 square kilometres (1,800 acres). The campus is the centre of academic and administrative activities of the university. A canal divides the academic blocks from the student lodgings.
- Gujranwala Campus: the faculties of Commerce, Economics and Management Sciences, Banking & Finance, Law, English, and Information Technology all conduct teaching in the campus. In addition to degree programs, campus provides short courses, facilitated by e-Rozgar program of Punjab Information Technology Board.
- Khanspur Campus: the summer campus is located at a height of about 2,100 m (7,000 ft) in the Himalayan range near Ayubia. The campus, in addition to providing research facilities, is used as a recreational center for the faculty and the students.
- Jhelum Campus: having opened in 2012, it offers studies relating to the faculties of Commerce, Economics and Management Sciences, Law and Computer Science.
- Pothohar Campus: located in Gujar Khan (77PH+F4), it began classes in 2023 in a rented building while the permanent campus is under construction on about 40.4 ha (100 acres) of land. It currently offers programs in Information Technology and Law.

== Academics ==
=== Rankings ===
University rankings

Global – Overall
- ARWU World: 701–800 (2023)
- QS World: =542 (2026)
- THE World: 801–1000 (2024)
- USNWR Global: =1140 (2023)

University of the Punjab is ranked 542 Internationally in the QS World University Rankings for the year 2025 and 2nd nationally. It is also ranked #18 in Asian universities by QS Rankings.

=== Faculties ===
There are 19 faculties with 10 constituent colleges, 73 departments, centers, and institutes. It has 1006 full-time and 300 part-time faculty members involved in teaching/research and over 6,000 non-teaching/supporting staff with 45,678 on campus students (27,907 Morning students, 16,552 Evening students and 1,219 Diploma students):

- Faculty of Arts and Humanities
- Faculty of Agriculture
- Faculty of Geo-Sciences
- Faculty of Information & Media Studies
- Faculty of Behavioral and Social Sciences
- Faculty of Commerce
- Faculty of Law
- Faculty of Economics and Management Sciences
- Faculty of Education
- Faculty of Engineering & Technology
- Faculty of Health Sciences
- Faculty of Islamic Studies
- Faculty of Life-Sciences
- Faculty of Oriental Learning
- Faculty of Pharmacy
- Faculty of Science
- Faculty of Quality & Industrial Systems Engineering

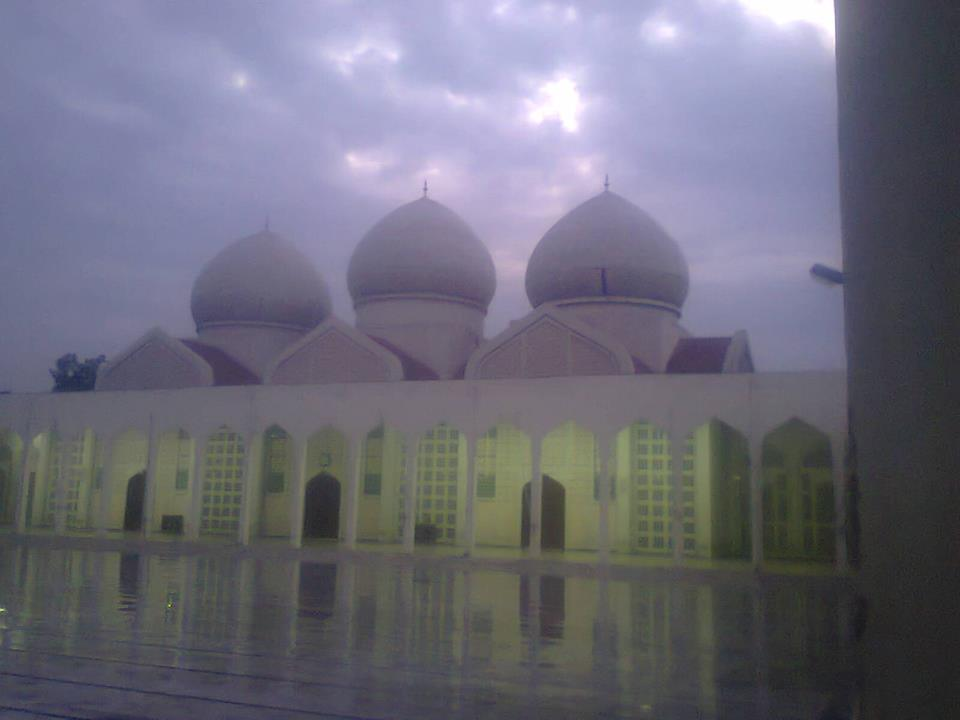
Punjab University Mosque

=== Constituent colleges ===
- College of Art and Design (PUCAD)
- Punjab University Law College (PULC)
- Hailey College of Banking & Finance
- Hailey College of Commerce (HCC)
- University College of Pharmacy, Punjab University College of Pharmacy (PUCP)
- Punjab University College of Information Technology (PUCIT)
- College of Statistical and Actuarial Sciences
- College of Engineering & Emerging computing
- Oriental College, Lahore
- College of Earth and Environmental Sciences (CEES)
- University Oriental College Lahore (PUOC)

=== Institutes ===
- Institute of Business Administration
- Institute of Administrative Sciences
- Institute of Business and Information Technology
- Institute of Information Management
- Institute of Botany
- Institute of Zoology
- Institute of Geography
- Institute of Special Education
- Institute of Microbiology and Biotechnology
- Institute of Applied Psychology
- Institute of Social and Cultural Studies
- Institute of Geology
- Institute of Electrical Electronics and Computer Engineering
- Institute of Polymer and Textile Engineering
- Institute of Chemical Engineering and Technology
- Institute of Metallurgy and Material Engineering
  - Metallurgical Laboratory
- Institute of English
- Institute of Punjabi and Cultural Studies
- Institute of Urdu Language and Literature

== Facilities ==
=== Library ===
The library is one of the largest libraries among the universities of Pakistan. The library has more than 500,000 books, magazines and periodicals, in nine national and international languages, in print and on CD, DVD, microfilm, microfiche, video and audio cassette, and manuscript. Punjab University Library has a two-storey building with a total area of 102,000 square feet. There are reading halls on the ground and first floors with a seating capacity of 2500 readers. The library has an internet lab. In the library there is a computerised "MLIMs" catalogue for searching material.

== Notable alumni ==
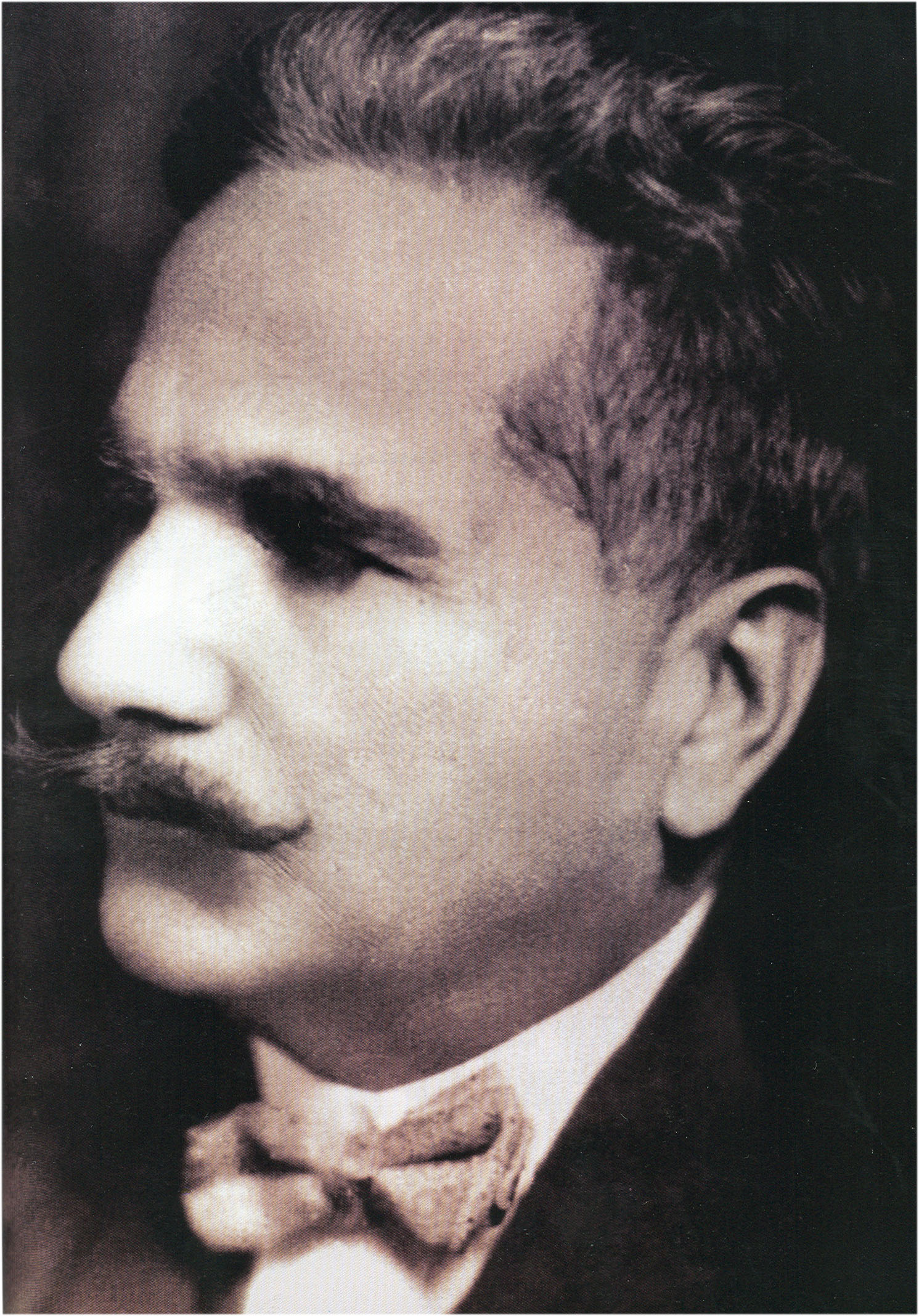
Muhammad Iqbal, among the first modern Muslim philosophers, the intellectual father of Pakistan.

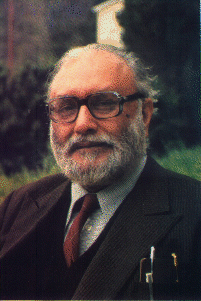
Abdus Salam was the first Pakistani to receive the Nobel Prize in Physics 1979.

=== Nobel Laureate ===
- Abdus Salam (Nobel laureate 1979 – Physics)
- Har Gobind Khorana (Nobel laureate 1968 – Medicine)
- Prof. Arthur Holly Compton (Former Faculty member and appointed lecturer in PU. Nobel laureate 1927 – Physics for his discovery of Compton's effect)

=== Educationist ===
- Niaz Ahmad Akhtar (Pakistani Academic)
- Manzoor Mirza (Educationist, economist, and book author)
- Farkhanda Manzoor - Former Vice-Chancellor of Lahore College for Women University
- Lokesh Chandra – Indian scholar of Vedic period, Buddhism and arts

=== Politicians ===
Raja Anwar [Pakistan people party founder] and [writer of {جھوٹے روپ کے درشن }]

- Asma Jahangir (Human rights activist and lawyer, co-founder of Human Rights Commission of Pakistan)
- Choudhry Rahmat Ali (Founder of the Pakistan Movement, coined the name of Pakistan)
- Inder Kumar Gujral (12th Prime Minister of India)
- Liaqat Baloch (Politician and Islamic Activist)
- Muhammad Iqbal (Urdu poet, philosopher, and politician)
- Salahuddin Quader Chowdhury (Bangladeshi politician, former member of the standing committee of Bangladesh Nationalist Party (BNP))
- Shahbaz Bhatti (Catholic Pakistani politician and minority rights activist)
- Syed Ali Shah Geelani (Pro-Pakistani, Kashmiri-separatist leader)
- Yashwant Singh Parmar (founder of the state of Himachal Pradesh in India)
- Yousaf Raza Gillani (18th Prime Minister of Pakistan)
- Zahoor Ahmed Sajid (former Member of Provincial Assembly of Punjab)

=== Scientists ===
- Athar Shah Khan (comedian, poet, and writer)
- Bilal U. Haq (marine geoscientist and laureate of France's Prestwich Prize in geology)
- Faqir Chand Kohli (father of the Indian IT Industry)
- Ishfaq Ahmad (Theoretical and Nuclear physicist, chairman of PAEC during the first atomic tests in Pakistan in 1998)
- Muhammad Sharif (Relativistic astrophysicist and cosmologist)
- Muhammad Tahir Ul Qadri (Pakistani-Canadian Islamic scholar)
- Sartaj Aziz (Pakistani economist, strategist and former National Security Advisor)
- Satish Dhawan (Indian rocket scientist, chairman of ISRO, and director of the Indian Institute of Science)
- Shoaib Mansoor (Pakistani movie director)
- Wasiullah Khan (Pakistani-American founder of the East–West University in Chicago)
- Yash Pal (Indian educator and scientist known for cosmic ray research as well as popularizing science education in India)

=== Lawyers ===
- M.D Tahir
- SM Zafar
- Ali Ahmed Kurd
- Sardar Latif Lhosa
- Asma Jahangir
- Naeem Bukhari

=== Judges ===
- Javed Iqbal (Son of Allama Muhammad Iqbal)
- Mian Saqib Nisar (25th Chief Justice of Pakistan)
- Jawwad S. Khawaja (23rd Chief Justice of Pakistan)
- Asif Saeed Khosa (26th Chief Justice of Pakistan)
- Muhammad Afzal Zullah
- Muhammad Munir (2nd Chief Justice of Pakistan)
- Nasim Hasan Shah (12th Chief Justice of Pakistan)
- Muhammad Yaqub Ali (CJP 1975–1977)
- Mansoor Ali Shah
- Nasira Iqbal
- Irshad Hasan Khan (CJP 2000–2002)
- Munib Akhtar
- Azmat Saeed
- Malik Shehzad Ahmed Khan

=== Architects ===
- Nayyar Ali Dada (Sitara e Imtiaz)

=== Literature ===
- Ashfaq Ahmed writer
- Shahbaz Malik, writer, bibliographer and research scholar
- Khalid Iqbal Yasir, poet
- Abdul Ahad Azad, poet

== Notable faculty ==
(Most of the alumni listed above also served in the University of the Punjab faculty, so their names are not repeated here)

- Prof. Arthur Compton (Nobel Lauterate- 1927 in Physics for his discovery of Compton's effect)
- Anwaar Ahmad (Writer and scholar, Received Pride of performance award for his literary services)
- Anna Molka Ahmed (Artist, Tamgha e Imtiaz 1963 and Pride of Performance award 1969)
- GF Bruce (Journalist and fashion editor for Town and Country)
- Mian Shah Din (Barrister and judge)
- Oliver Elton (English literary scholar)
- Kanwal Ameen (2010 HEC Best University Teacher Award)
- E.M. Forster (Famous English novelist. Nominated for Nobel Prize Awards in 20 separate years)
- Omar Asghar Khan (Pakistani economist and founder of National Democratic Party)
- Gottlieb Wilhelm Leitner (British Orientalist)
- Ishtiaq Hussain Qureshi (Pakistani historian and received Sitara e Imitiaz)
- Sir Ganga Ram (Indian architect who designed and built Aitchison College, Lahore Museum, General post office Lahore, Hailey College of Commerce and also Model Town and Gulberg)
- Alfred Cooper Woolner (ex Vice chancellor of Punjab University)
- Niaz Ahmad Akhtar (Professor Emeritus and Former Vice-Chancellor of Punjab University)

== Vice Chancellors ==
- James Broadwood Lyall
- Baden Henry Powell
- George Robert Elsmie
- William Henry Rattiga
- William Mackworth Young
- Charles Arthur Roe
- Thomas Gordon Walker
- Sir Lewis Tupper
- Sir P. C. Chatterjee
- Frederick Robertson (judge)
- Sir James Ewing
- H. J. Maynard
- J. Stephenson
- H. B. Durrand
- Geoffrey Fitzhervey de Montmorency
- A. C. Woolner
- Malcolm Lyall Darling
- George. D. Brane
- B. H. Dobson
- C. H. Rice
- Muhammad Afzal Husain
- Abdur Rahman (Pakistani judge)
- Omar Hayat Malik
- Mian Abdul Rashid
- S. A. Rahman
- Muhammad Ajmal
- Lt. General Muhammad Safdar
- Mujahid Kamran
- Zafar Moeen Nasir
- Niaz Ahmad Akhtar
- Asghar Zaidi
- Khalid Mahmood
- Muhammad Ali (Academic and biologist)

== See also ==
- List of Islamic educational institutions
- Punjab University Law College
- List of universities in Pakistan
  - List of universities in Islamabad
  - List of universities of Punjab, Pakistan
  - List of universities in Sindh
  - List of universities in Khyber Pakhtunkhwa
  - List of universities in Balochistan
  - List of universities in Azad Kashmir
  - List of universities in Gilgit-Baltistan
