= List of educational institutions in Lahore =

This is a list of educational institutions located in the district of Lahore in Pakistan. Special education institutions are listed at List of special education institutions in Lahore.

== Primary and secondary educational institutions ==
- IPS Uni (Unit Of Education)
- Inspire Education consultants(2009) Lahore
- Genuine Technology of Computer College
- Matiz Education Consultants
- Nordic International School Lahore
- ACE School System
- ACE Elementary School
- ACES Gabriel International School
- Shan Computer Trainings Institute, Lahore
- Shan Computer Trainings Institute
- Adabistan-e-Soophia School
- Aitchison College, Lahore
- Al-A'la International Islamic School
- Shining Girls High School
- Alma Mater School
- American International School System
- American Lycetuff School System
- American Lyceum
- Beaconhouse Newlands, Lahore
- Beaconhouse School System
- Benison Islamic School
- Bloomfield Hall School
- Central Model School
- Chand Bagh School
- Convent of Jesus and Mary
- Career Institute
- Crescent Model Higher Secondary School
- Dar-e-Arqam Schools
- Dar-ul-Mominien Schooling System
- Divisional Public School
- EPIC (Educational Partnership of Islamic and Contemporary Studies)
- Esena Foundation High School
- Fairfield High School lahore
- Farooq Girls High School
- FG Fazaia Secondary School, PAF Base Iqbal Camp, Lahore
- Fazaia Inter College
- Genuine Technology of Computer College
- Franciscan Girls High School
- Forman Christian College
- Froebel's International School
- Government College of Science
- Garrison College for Boys, 52-A Sarfraz Rafiqui Road, Lahore Cantt.
- Garison boys high school
- Grand Charter School
- Government Gulberg High School, Lahore Cantt
- Govt High School Manhala, Lahore
- Hashmat Memorial Schools System
- Heritage School System
- International School of Choueifat
- Islamic International School System
- Jinnah Foundation High School
- Joan McDonald High School, Lahore
- Khaliqia Foundation High School
- Kibria Model High School
- King Way Group of Schools
- KIPS School and College
- Lahore Academy of Science and Technology
- Lahore American School
- Lahore College of Arts and Sciences
- Lahore Garrison Education System
- Lahore Grammar School
- Lahore Presentation Convent School
- Lahore Cantt Public High School
- Leaders Canadian School
- St. Lawrence High School, Gulberg
- Lexicon School System Lahore Cantt
- Learning Alliance
- Maktab-A MIT Alumnus's Educational Initiative
- MQ Foundation High School
- Mus'ab School System
- New Era Grammar School
- National Grammar School
- Pakistan Public School (PPS) Township, Lahore
- PakTurk International Schools and Colleges
- Queen Mary College
- Resource Academia
- Rosans Islamic School
- Sacred Heart High School for Boys
- Sacred Heart High School for Girls
- Salamat School System
- Scholastic Islamiah
- SCIL (School for Contemporary and Islamic Learning)
- School of Lahore
- Silk School System
- Siqarah Girls High School, Awaisia Society, College, Road, Lahore
- Sir Syed School System
- Smart School System
- Society Public School
- St. Anthony's High School
- St Francis High School
- St. Mary's High School
- St. Thomas' School, Gulberg
- Stellar School System
- The School Of Wisdom
- The Citizens Foundation
- The City School
- The Country School (a project of Bloomfield Hall School)
- The Lahore Alma
- The Learners Grammar High School
- The Learners Kids Campus
- The Lahore Lyceum
- The Oneiro Schoolhouse
- The Punjab Academy 77-E-1, wapda town lhr
- The Punjab School
- The Trust School
- The Westbridge Junior & Upper School
- The Westbridge Schools
- Superior Group of Colleges
- University College Lahore
- Unique Group Of Colleges
- Universal High School Lahore
- Govt GHSS Manhala
- Govt. High School Balloki, Kasur (Boys)
- The Punjab School, Defence Road Campus
- The punjab School, Jubilee Town Campus
- Right Education, Lahore

== Tertiary and quaternary educational institutions ==
=== Universities ===
The following is a list of universities recognized by Higher Education Commission of Pakistan (HEC):

==== Public universities ====
- COMSATS Institute of Information Technology *
- Bahria University *
- Government College University
- Information Technology University
- King Edward Medical University
- Government M.A.O. Graduate College, Lahore
- Kinnaird College for Women
- Lahore College for Women University
- National College of Arts
- University of Education
- University of Engineering and Technology
- University of Health Sciences
- University of the Punjab
- University of Veterinary and Animal Sciences
- Virtual University of Pakistan

==== Private universities ====
- Beaconhouse National University
- Forman Christian College
- Global Institute Lahore
- Hajvery University
- Imperial College of Business Studies
- Institute of Management Sciences
- Lahore Garrison University
- Lahore School of Economics
- Lahore University of Management Sciences
- Minhaj University
- National College of Business Administration & Economics
- National University of Computer and Emerging Sciences *
- National University of Modern Languages *
- NUR International University Lahore (NUR- Fatima Memorial System)
- PIQC Institute of Quality Lahore
- Qarshi University
- Riphah International University
- The Superior College
- University of Central Punjab
- University of Lahore
- Infinity School of Engineering Lahore
- University of Sargodha Lahore
- University of Management and Technology
- University of South Asia

University of management and technology.

* main campus is located in Lahore

=== Schools of accounting ===
The following is a list of institutes recognized by Institute of Chartered Accountants of Pakistan (ICAP):

- CFE College of Accountancy and Finance
- College of Accountancy & Professional Studies
- Financial Training College
- IBF - Institute of Business & Finance
- RISE School of Accountancy
- SKANS School of Accountancy
- University of Lahore

=== Schools of allied health sciences ===
- Advance Life College of Medical Sciences Lahore (Affiliated with G C University Faisalabad)
- King Edward Medical University
- Superior University
- University of Lahore
- University of Health Sciences, Lahore - affiliated institutes:
  - Shaikh Khalifa Bin Zayed Al-Nahyan Medical and Dental College
  - Allama Iqbal Medical College
  - De'Montmorency College of Dentistry
  - Fatima Jinnah Medical College
  - FMH Institute of Allied Health Sciences
  - Gulab Devi Postgraduate Medical Institute
  - Institute of Public Health
  - Lahore Medical and Dental College
  - Punjab Institute of Cardiology (only B.Sc in Cardiac Perfusion)
  - Services Institute of Medical Sciences
  - The Children's Hospital (School of Allied Health Sciences)
- University of Veterinary and Animal Sciences

=== Schools of architecture ===
- Beaconhouse National University (School of Architecture and Design)
- COMSATS University of Science and Technology (Department of Architecture and Design)
- National College of Arts (Department of Architecture)
- Superior University Lahore
- University of Engineering and Technology (School of Architecture and Design)
- University of the Punjab (School of Art and Design)
- University of Management and Technology (Institute of Textile and Industrial Sciences (ITIS))
- University of South Asia

=== Schools of business ===
The following is a list of institutes recognized by National Business Education Accreditation Council (NBEAC):

- Riphah International University(Riphah School of Business Administration)
- COMSATS Institute of Information Technology (main campus is located in Islamabad)
- Imperial College of Business Studies
- Superior University, Faculty of Business Administration
  - Hailey College of Banking and Finance
  - Hailey College of Commerce
- Imperial College of Business Studies, School of Management and Business Studies
- Institute of Management Sciences, Department of Management Sciences
- Lahore School of Economics, Faculty of Business Administration
- Lahore University of Management Sciences, Suleman Dawood School of Business
- National College of Business Administration and Economics, School of Business Administration
- National University of Computer and Emerging Sciences, FAST School of Management (main campus in Islamabad)
- University of Central Punjab, UCP Business School
- University of Engineering and Technology, Institute of Business and Management
- University of Lahore, Lahore Business School
- University of Management and Technology, School of Business and Economics
- University of the Punjab
- University of South Asia, USA Business School
- University of Veterinary and Animal Sciences, Lahore, UVAS Business School
- Virtual University of Pakistan Faculty of Management
- The Girls College Lahore Institute of Business and Commerce

=== Schools of computing ===
The following is a list of institutes recognized by National Computing Education Accreditation Council (NCEAC):

- COMSATS Institute of Information Technology (Lahore campus) - BS-CS
- Bahria University (Lahore campus) - BS-CS, BS-IT
- Government College University, Lahore - BS-CS
- National University of Computer and Emerging Sciences
- Lahore College for Women University - BS-CS
- National University of Computer & Emerging Sciences (Lahore campus)* - BS-CS
- Punjab University College of Information Technology (PUCIT) - BS-CS, BS-IT, BS-SE
- University of Engineering and Technology, Lahore - BS-CS
- University of Management and Technology - BS-CS, BS-SE
- Superior University - BCS, BS-IT
- Lahore Garrison University - BSCS
- The University of Lahore
- University of Central Punjab
- University of Education lahore
- Information Technology University, Lahore
- PiCiT Computer College
- University of South Asia
- Virtual University of Pakistan Faculty of CS & IT

* oldest computer science department in Lahore

=== Schools of dentistry ===
The following is a list of undergraduate dental institutions recognized by PMDC.

- Shaikh Khalifa Bin Zayed Al-Nahyan Medical and Dental College
- CMH Lahore Medical and Dental College
- De'Montmorency College of Dentistry
- FMH College of Medicine and Dentistry
- Lahore Medical and Dental College
- Shalamar Medical and Dental College
- Sharif Medical and Dental College
- University College of Medicine and Dentistry

=== Schools of engineering ===
The following is a list of institutes recognized by Pakistan Engineering Council (PEC):

- Infinity School of Engineering
- Allama Iqbal Open University
  - Institute of Engineering and Technology
- Government College University
- Government Islamia College, Civil Lines.
- Lahore College for Women University
- Lahore University of Management Sciences
- National University of Computer and Emerging Sciences (Lahore Campus)
- Superior University Lahore
- University of Central Punjab
- University of Engineering and Technology
- University of Lahore
- University of Management and Technology
- University of the Punjab
  - College of Engineering and Emerging Technologies
  - Institute of Chemical Engineering and Technology
  - Institute of Quality and Technology Management
- University of South Asia

=== Schools of fashion ===
- International Fashion Academy Pakistan
- Institute of art design & Management - STEP
- Lahore School of Fashion Design
- Pakistan Institute of Fashion and Design

=== Schools of law ===
- Lahore University of Management Sciences (School of Humanities, Social Sciences and Law)
- Superior College of Law
- Topper Law College Lahore
- University College Lahore
- University of Lahore, "College of Law"
- University of the Punjab (Punjab University Law College)
  - City Law College
  - Hamayat Islam Law College
  - Himayat-e-Islam Degree College for Women
  - Lahore Law College
  - Pakistan College of Law
  - Punjab Law College
  - Quaid-e-Azam Law College
  - Leads Law College, Township, Lahore
- University of South Asia, Law Department

=== Schools of medicine ===
The following is a list of undergraduate medical institutions recognized by Pakistan Medical and Dental Council (PMDC) as of 2010.

- King Edward Medical University
- Superior University
  - Azra Naheed Medical College
- University of Lahore
  - University College of Medicine and Dentistry
- University of Health Sciences
  - Akhtar Saeed Medical and Dental College
  - Allama Iqbal Medical College
  - Ameer-ud-Din Medical College
  - Avicenna Medical College
  - Central Park Medical College
  - CMH Lahore Medical and Dental College
  - Continental Medical College
  - FMH College of Medicine and Dentistry
  - Johar Institute of Professional Studies (University of Sargodha - UoS)
  - Lahore Medical and Dental College
  - Pak Red Crescent Medical and Dental College
  - Rashid Latif Medical College
  - Services Institute of Medical Sciences
  - Shalamar Medical and Dental College
  - Sharif Medical and Dental College
- University of the Punjab
  - Fatima Jinnah Medical College
  - Shaikh Khalifa Bin Zayed Al-Nahyan Medical and Dental College

The following is a list of postgraduate medical institutions recognized by PMDC as of 2009.

- College of Physicians and Surgeons of Pakistan
- Gulab Devi Postgraduate Medical Institute
- Institute of Public Health
- Punjab Institute of Cardiology
- Shaikh Zayed Postgraduate Medical Institute
- University of Health Sciences

=== Schools of nursing ===
- Children's Hospital *
- Combined Military Hospital * **
- Ittefaq Hospital *
- Jinnah Hospital * **
- Lady Aitchison Hospital *
- Lady Willingdon Hospital *
- Lahore General Hospital *
- Mayo Hospital *
- Saida Waheed College of Nursing * **
- Services Hospital *
- University of Lahore *
- Shaikh Zayed Hospital *
- Shalamar Nursing College **
- Sir Ganga Ram Hospital *
- Postgraduate College of Nursing *
- Saida Waheed College of Nursing * **
- Shalamar Nursing College **

* recognized by PNS for 2 year Post RN B.Sc in Nursing, as of 2011
** affiliated with University of Health Sciences, Lahore for 2 year Post RN B.Sc in Nursing, as of 2012

=== Schools of pharmacy ===
The following is a list of pharmacy institutions that are recognized by the Pharmacy Council of Pakistan (PCP):

- Akhtar Saeed College of Pharmaceutical Sciences, University of Sargodha
- Hajvery University
- Lahore College for Women University
- Lahore College of Pharmaceutical Sciences, University of Sargodha
- Lahore Pharmacy College, University of Health Sciences
- Superior University
- The National Institute of Health Sciences, University of Health Sciences
- University College of Pharmacy, University of the Punjab
- University of Central Punjab
- University of Lahore
- University of Veterinary and Animal Sciences
- Johar Institute of Professional Studies (University of Sargodha)

=== Schools of veterinary medicine ===
- Riphah International University
  - Riphah College of Veterinary Sciences
- University of Veterinary and Animal Sciences

=== Other institutes ===
- Don Bosco Technical Institute
- PIQC Institute of Quality Lahore
- EVS Professional Training Institute
- Genuine Technology of Computer College
- Shan Computer Trainings Institute
- Ahmad Hassan Polytechnic Institute - affiliated with University of Sargodha
- Al-Mawrid Institute of Islamic Sciences
- Government College of Science
- Lahore Bible Baptist College
- Assemblies of Souls Winners Bible College
- Lahore College of Theology
- Net Scope Computer College, Lahore
- Multan Institute of Professional Studies Multan
- ThinkFaculty Professional Training

== See also ==
- Education in Lahore
- List of special education institutions in Lahore
- List of special schools in Lahore
