= List of pharmacy schools in Pakistan =

This is a district-wise list of pharmacy schools located in Pakistan and accredited by Pharmacy Council of Pakistan.

== Azad Kashmir ==
=== Mirpur ===
- Mohi-ud-Din Islamic University - Pharm. D.
- Akson College of Pharmacy - Pharm. D.

=== Rawlakot ===
University of Poonch, Rawlakot

== Balochistan ==
=== Quetta ===
- Department of Pharmacy, University of Balochistan - B. Pharmacy, Pharm. D.

== Capital Territory ==
=== Islamabad ===
- Shifa College of Pharmaceutical Sciences, Shifa Tameer-e-Millat University - Pharm. D.
- Hamdard University (Islamabad Campus) - B. Pharmacy, Pharm. D.
- Riphah Institute of Pharmacy, Riphah International University - Pharm. D.
- Department of Pharmacy, University of Lahore (Islamabad Campus) - Pharm. D.
- Quaid-i-Azam University - Pharm. D. Public
- Al-Fateh Institute of Health Sciences (Islamabad Campus) - B. Pharmacy
- Faculty of Pharmacy, Capital University of Science and Technology - Pharm.D, M.Phil

== Khyber Pakhtunkhwa ==
=== Abbottabad ===
- Department of Pharmacy, Abbottabad University of Science and Technology - Pharm. D.
- Department of Pharmacy, COMSATS Institute of Information Technology - Pharm. D.
- Women Institute of Learning - Pharm. D.
- Pakistan Institute of Professional Studies - Pharm.D

=== Dera Ismail Khan ===
- Faculty of Pharmacy, Gomal University - B. Pharmacy, Pharm. D.

=== Kohat ===
- Department of Pharmacy, Kohat University of Science and Technology - Pharm. D.

=== Malakand ===
- Department of Pharmacy, University of Malakand, Batkhela - Pharm. D.

=== Mardan ===
- Abdul Wali Khan University Mardan - Pharm. D.

=== Peshawar ===
- Department of Pharmacy, University of Peshawar - B. Pharmacy, Pharm. D.
- Faculty of Pharmacy, Sarhad University of Science and Information Technology - Pharm. D.
- Department of Pharmacy, Abasyn University - Pharm. D.

=== Swabi ===
- University of Swabi - Pharm. D.

== Punjab ==
=== Sargodha ===
- Faculty of Pharmacy, University of Sargodha - Pharm. D. Public

=== Bahawalpur ===
- Faculty of Pharmacy, Islamia University - B. Pharmacy, Pharm. D. Public

=== Faisalabad ===
- College of Pharmacy, Government College University, Faisalabad - Pharm. D. Public
- Faculty of Pharmacy, University of Faisalabad - Pharm. D.
- Institute of pharmacy, physiology &pharmacology University of Agriculture, Faisalabad- Pharm.D.Public

=== Lahore ===
- University College of Pharmacy, University of the Punjab - B. Pharmacy, Pharm. D. Public
- Forman Christian Chartered University [FCCU] - Pharm.d Department
- Institute of Pharmaceutical Sciences, University of Veterinary and Animal Sciences - Pharm. D.Public
- Lahore College of Pharmaceutical Sciences - B. Pharmacy, Pharm. D.
- University of Central Punjab - Pharm. D.
- Faculty of Pharmacy, University of Lahore (Lahore Campus) - B. Pharmacy, Pharm. D.
- Faculty of Pharmacy, Hajvery University - Pharm. D.
- Akhtar Saeed College of Pharmaceutical Sciences - Pharm. D.
- Lahore Pharmacy College - Pharm. D.
- The Superior College - Pharm. D.
- Riphah International University, (Lahore Campus) - Pharm. D.
- University of South Asia (Pakistan) - Pharm. D.
- Department of Pharmacy, Lahore College for Women University - B. Pharmacy, Pharm. D. Public
- Leads College of Pharmacy - Pharm. D.
- Johar Institute of Professional Studies - Pharm. D.
- Gulab Devi Institute of Pharmacy, Gulab Devi Educational Complex, Lahore - Pharm. D (Doctor of Pharmacy)
- Pak Institute of Pharmaceutical Sciences
- Rashid latif Medical College Institute of Pharmaceutical Science

=== Multan ===
- Faculty of Pharmacy, Bahauddin Zakriya University - B. Pharmacy, Pharm. D. Public
- Department of Pharmacy, Southern Punjab Institute of Health Sciences (SPIHS), Multan - Pharm. D. Private

=== Okara ===
- AIMS International College of Pharmacy, Okara Campus. Suffa Educational Complex - Pharm.D.

=== Rawalpindi ===
- Margalla Institute of Health Sciences (Margalla College of Pharmacy) - Pharm. D.
- Yusra Institute of Pharmaceutical Science

=== Sialkot ===
- Islam College of Pharmacy - Pharm. D.

=== Kharian ===
- Cadson College of Pharmacy - Pharm. D

Gujrat city:

The university of Chenab

Offer Pharm-D program

== Sindh ==
Faculty of Pharmacy of University of Sindh.

Programs: Doctor of Pharmacy of 5 years (pharm.D)

=== Karachi ===
- Faculty of Pharmacy, University of Karachi - B. Pharmacy, Pharm. D.
- College of Pharmacy, Dow University of Health Sciences - Pharm. D.
- Faculty of Pharmacy, Salim Habib University - Pharm D.
- Institute of Pharmaceutical Sciences, Baqai Medical University - B. Pharmacy, Pharm. D.
- Faculty of Pharmacy, Jinnah University for Women - B. Pharmacy, Pharm. D.
- Faculty of Pharmacy, Hamdard University (Karachi Campus) - B. Pharmacy, Pharm. D.
- Faculty of Pharmacy, Ziauddin University - Pharm. D.
- College of Pharmacy Nazeer Hussain University - Pharm D.
- Faculty of Pharmacy, Iqra University - Pharm D.
- Institute of Pharmaceutical Sciences, Jinnah Sindh Medical University - Pharm D.
- College of Pharmacy, Jinnah College of Pharmacy - Pharm D.

=== Shaheed Benazirababd ===
- College of Pharmacy, Peoples University of Medical and Health Sciences - Pharm. D.

== See also ==
- List of medical schools in Pakistan
  - List of medical schools in Islamabad
  - List of medical schools in Punjab, Pakistan
  - List of medical schools in Sindh
  - List of medical schools in Balochistan
  - List of medical schools in Khyber Pakhtunkhwa
  - List of medical schools in Azad Kashmir
  - List of medical schools in Gilgit-Baltistan
- List of universities in Pakistan
  - List of universities in Islamabad
  - List of universities of Punjab, Pakistan
  - List of universities in Sindh
  - List of universities in Khyber Pakhtunkhwa
  - List of universities in Balochistan
  - List of universities in Azad Kashmir
  - List of universities in Gilgit-Baltistan
