= Maktab =

Maktab (in Arabic مكتب) from the Arabic word kataba or write, refers to a school, or a business office.

It may also refer to:

- Kuttab (also called maktab), a traditional elementary school in the Muslim world

== Containing the term ==
- Amin Maktab, a special education center for mentally challenged children located in Gulberg, Lahore, Punjab, Pakistan established in 1961
- Maktabkhana (disambiguation)
- Maktab al-Khidamat (MAK), also Maktab Khadamāt al-Mujāhidīn al-'Arab, also known as the Afghan Services Bureau, was founded in 1984 by Abdullah Azzam, Wa'el Hamza Julaidan, Osama bin Laden and Ayman al-Zawahiri to raise funds and recruit foreign mujahidin for the war against the Soviets in Afghanistan
- Maktab Nasional, a private Catholic mission secondary school located in Likas, Kota Kinabalu, Sabah
- Maktab Rendah Sains MARA or MARA Junior Science College, a group of boarding schools created by Majlis Amanah Rakyat (MARA), a Malaysian government agency
- Maktab-e Tawhid, was a Shi'i seminary for women, established in Qom, Iran's clerical center in 1975, as a wing of the Haghani school
