= Education in Lahore =

Education in Pakistani city

The education system in Lahore is formulated along specific modern, religious, cultural, social, psychological, commerce and scientific injunctions. Lahore is Pakistan’s largest producer of professionals in the fields of science, technology, IT, engineering, medicine, nuclear sciences, pharmacology, telecommunication, biotechnology and microelectronics. Most of the reputable universities are public, but in recent years there has also been an upsurge in the number of private universities. The current literacy rate of Lahore is 64%. The standard national system of education is mainly inspired from the British system. The system also aims to imbibe a secular outlook among the students with the awareness of the rich cultural heritage of Pakistan. Lahore has a wide range of schools, colleges and universities that caters to diverse streams.

The system is divided into five levels: primary (grades one through five); middle (grades six through eight); high (grades nine and ten, leading to the Secondary School Certificate); intermediate (grades eleven and twelve, leading to a Higher Secondary School Certificate); and university programs leading to graduate and advanced degrees.

Lahore, like majority of the cities in Pakistan has both public and private educational institutions from primary to university level. Most educational institutions are gender based from primary to university level.

All academic education institutions are the responsibility of the provincial governments. The federal government mostly assists in curriculum development, accreditation and some financing of research.

== Stages of education ==
=== Primary education ===
==== Pre-school ====
Pre-school education is designed for 3–5 years old and usually consists of three stages: play group, nursery and kindergarten. Students usually sit through an examination before finishing pre-school.

==== Junior school ====
After pre-school education, students go through junior school from grades 1 to 4. The curriculum is usually subject to the institution and usually include Urdu, English, mathematics, arts, science, social studies, computer studies and physical education. Students are also taught either Islamic studies (Islamiyat) or ethics/theology/religious studies depending on their religious preference. Some schools also teach other foreign languages like Arabic language as a part of their curriculum. The language of instruction depends on the nature of institution itself, whether it is an English-medium school or an Urdu-medium school. All students sit through an annual final examinations in each subject at the end of an academic year.

==== Middle school ====
Middle school from grades 5 to 8. Once again, the curriculum is usually subject to the institution. The eight commonly examined disciplines are Urdu, English, mathematics, arts, science, social studies, religious studies (for example Islamic studies) and computer studies/ICT which may or may not be subject to availability of a computer laboratory in the premises. Geography and history are usually taught as components of social studies or maybe taught and examined separately. As with the junior school, all students sit through an annual final examinations in each subject at the end of an academic year. The non-examined disciplines include physical education and in some schools, music, film and drama. Female students may also be taught home economics, food and nutrition or culinary arts, and needlework/sewing in some schools. Some institutes also give instruction in foreign languages such as Arabic, French, Chinese, Persian or indigenous languages like Punjabi, which are either compulsory or optional.

=== Secondary education ===
Secondary education begins from grade 9 and lasts for four years. After end of each of the four school years, students are required to pass a national examination administered by the Board of Intermediate and Secondary Education, Lahore (Board of Intermediate and Secondary Education, Lahore).

==== High school ====
Upon completion of grade 9, students are expected to take a standardized test in each of the first parts of their academic subjects. They again give these tests of the second parts of the same courses at the end of grade 10. Upon successful completion of these two examinations, they are awarded a Secondary School Certificate (or SSC). This locally termed as 'matriculation certificate' or 'matric' for short. The curriculum usually includes a combination of at least eight courses:

- Two compulsory linguistics/literature subjects:
  - English as second language
  - Urdu as first language
- Three compulsory core subjects:
  - Mathematics
  - Pakistan studies
  - Study of religion; either Islamiyat or Ethics
- Three electives from one of the following groups:
  - "Sciences group" which includes chemistry, physics and either biology or computing
  - "Arts group" which includes any three from; arts and model drawing, civics, economics, education, elective Islamiyat, elective Urdu, elements of home economics, food and nutrition, general science, geometrical and technical drawing, health and physical education, history of Islam, Persian, physiology and hygiene, and Punjabi.

==== Intermediate College ====
Students then enter an intermediate college and complete grades 11 and 12. Upon completion of each of the two grades, they again take standardised tests in their academic subjects. Upon successful completion of these examinations, students are awarded the Higher Secondary (School) Certificate (or HSC). This level of education is also casually called the 'intermediate' or sometimes simply 'inter'. There are many streams of courses students can choose for their 11 and 12 grades, such as:

- Faculty of Arts) includes humanities (or social sciences) and commerce subgroups
- Faculty of Science includes pre-medical or pre-engineering subgroups
- Intermediate in Computer Sciences includes computer sciences and allied subgroups

Each stream consists of three electives and as well as three compulsory subjects of English, Urdu, Islamiyat (grade 11 only) and Pakistan Studies (grade 12 only). The stream must be chosen carefully as a student can only enter a certain regulated professional program if he has completed the required courses, for example only those students may enroll in a medical college who have taken the pre-medical F.Sc examination.

==== GCE O, AS and A Levels ====
Alternative qualifications in Lahore are also available but are maintained by other examination boards instead of BISE. The increasingly common alternative is the General Certificate of Education (or GCE), where SSC and HSC are replaced by Ordinary Level (or O Level) and Advanced Level (or A Level) respectively. Other qualifications include IGCSE which replaces SSC. GCE O Level, IGCSE and GCE AS/A Level are examined by British board of CIE of the Cambridge Assessment, while IGCSE and A Level can also be examined by Edexcel of the Pearson PLC. The examinations themselves are managed by the British Council of Pakistan. Generally, 8-10 courses are selected by students at GCE O Levels and 3-5 at GCE AS/A Levels. The students may be restricted by their academic institution to take a limited number of specified combinations of courses. Usually, in O Levels, these combinations mimic the courses of the national SSC 'matriculation' program. However, the students may choose to sit in these examinations for some or all courses of their personal choice, independently or 'privately', not being represented by any institution. Common GCE O Level / IGCSE subjects offered by institutions are:

- Compulsory: English Language, Islamiyat, Mathematics (D), Pakistan Studies, Urdu as Second Language
- Electives: Biology, Business Studies, Commerce, Computer Studies, Chemistry, Economics, Physics, Principles of Accounting
- Supplemental: Applied ICT, Art and Design, Environmental Management, Food and Nutrition, Geography, History: World Affairs, Human Biology, Literature in English, Mathematics - Additional, Sociology, Statistics, Urdu as Second Language

Some common A Level subjects taken offered by institutions in Lahore are:

- Accounting (CIE 9706)
- Applied ICT (CIE 9713)
- Art and Design (CIE 9704)
- Biology (CIE 9700)
- Business Studies (CIE 9707)
- Chemistry (CIE 9701)
- Computing (CIE 9691)
- Economics (CIE 9708)
- English Language (CIE 8693)
- Environmental Management (CIE 8291)
- Literature in English (CIE 9695)
- General Paper (CIE 8001)
- Geography (CIE 9696)
- Global Perspectives (CIE 0457)
- Government and Politics (Edexcel 9GP01)
- History (CIE 9389)
- Law (CIE 9084)
- Mathematics (CIE 9709)
- Further Mathematics (CIE 9231)
- Media Studies (CIE 9607)
- Physics (CIE 9702)
- Psychology (CIE 9698)
- Sociology (CIE 9699)
- Urdu (CIE 9686)

==== Advanced Placement ====
Advanced Placement (or AP) is an alternative option but much less common than GCE or IGCSE. This replaces the secondary school education as 'High School Education' instead. AP exams are monitored by a North American examination board, College Board and can only be given under supervision of centers which are registered with the College Board, unlike GCE O/AS/A Level and IGCSE which can also be given privately.

=== Tertiary education ===
After earning their HSC, students may study in a professional college for Bachelor's degree courses such as engineering (B.Engg), medicine (MBBS), dentistry (BDS), veterinary medicine (DVM), law (LLB), architecture (B.Arch) and nursing (B.Nurs). These courses require four or five years of study. Students can also attend a university for Bachelor of Arts (BA), Bachelor of Science (BSc), Bachelor of Commerce (BCom) or Bachelor of Business Administration (BBA) degree courses.

There are two types of Bachelor courses available: Pass or Honours. Pass degree requires two years of study and students normally read three optional subjects (such as chemistry or economics) in addition to almost equal number of compulsory subjects (such as English and Pakistan studies). Honours degree requires three or four years of study, and students normally specialize in a chosen field of study, such as biochemistry (BSc Hons. Biochemistry).

=== Quaternary education ===
Many Master's degree programs only require one and a half years of study. Doctor of Philosophy (PhD) education is also available in selected areas and is usually pursued after earning a Master's degree. Students pursuing PhD degrees must choose a specific field and a university that is doing research work in that field.

== Public Universities ==
Lahore hosts some of Pakistan's oldest educational institutes: Government College Lahore (now Government College University), established in 1864; University of the Punjab, established in 1882;

- National College of Arts, a federal Degree Awarding institution
- University of Education Main Campus Township, Lahore established in 2002

Pakistan Institute of Fashion and Disgn, Lahore a Federal Government Institute

- Information Technology University

as Pakistan's first specialized university in the field of education.

Punjab Tianjan University of Technology, Lahore

Virtual University Of Pakistan, Lahore

University of Health Sciences, Lahore established in 2002

and University of Engineering and Technology, Lahore, established in 1921. University of Engineering and Technology, Lahore is Pakistan's oldest technical degree-awarding institute and its first university in the field of engineering and technology. Established as Mughalpura Technical College in 1921, it was upgraded to a university in 1961. UET Lahore is Pakistan's largest public-sector engineering university, offering bachelor's degrees in 29 specialties and Master of Science degrees in 55 specialties.

- King Edward Medical University
- University of Veterinary and Animal Sciences

Comsats University Islamabad, Lahore Campus

National University of Modern Language, Islamabad, Lahore Campus

- Allama Iqbal Open University

Lahore Campus

- COMSATS Institute of Information Technology*
- Bahria University, Lahore* Lahore Campus

Government College of Science, wahdat road Lahore

Government M.A.O College, Lahore

Government College Township, Lahore Many more public colleges for boys and Girls

== Public Women Universities ==
Kinnaird College, established in 1913; Lahore College for Women University, established in 1922, Queen Mary College, Lahore, established in 1908 University of Home Economics, Lahore established in 1955 University of Education, Female Campus, Bank Road, Lahore

Fatima Jinnah Medical University, Lahore

=== International recognition ===
Many students of internationally recognized institutions of Lahore go abroad for higher studies after completing their graduation. These institutes include Lahore University of Management Sciences, University of Engineering and Technology, Lahore, King Edward Medical University and University of the Punjab. University of the Punjab is the only South Asian institute that holds the credit of being the associate partner in many experiments of CERN Laboratories.

== Private Universities ==
Forman Christian College University is one of the oldest and reputable institute in Pakistan. For its excellent educational background and alumni it is well recognized around the globe.

The University of Lahore is a new private sector university in Lahore. It is emerging as a university with strength in the areas of engineering sciences and technology, business and administrative sciences, molecular biology and biotechnology, medicine and dentistry, computer science, and allied health sciences.

Lahore's institutes in the fields of computer science, information technology, and engineering include the National University of Computer and Emerging Sciences

Lahore's notable business schools include the University of Management and Technology, Lahore University of Management Sciences, Lahore School of Economics.

Lahore boasts some of the finest high schools in Asia: Aitchison College, Divisional Public School, St. Anthony's College, Bloomfield Hall Schools, Lahore Grammar School, Lahore College of Arts and Sciences, Beaconhouse School System and Resource Academia, which feed students to leading universities across the globe.

== See also ==
- List of educational institutions in Lahore
- List of special schools in Lahore
- Education in Pakistan
