= St. Francis High School, Lahore =

St Francis High School
- Lahore, Punjab; Pakistan

Information
- Type: Private primary and high school
- Religious affiliation: Catholicism
- Established: 1842 (184 years ago)
- Founder: Roman Catholic Church
- Oversight: Catholic Board of Education
- Gender: Boys
- Age: 5 to 16
- Enrollment: 300 (approximately)
- Affiliations: Board of Intermediate and Secondary Education, Lahore

St. Francis High School, formerly known as Government St. Francis High School is a private Catholic school for boys, located in Lahore, Punjab, Pakistan. In spite of its name as a high school, the school delivers a primary and high school education.

== History ==
The school was founded by the Roman Catholic Church in 1842.

The school was taken over by the government in 1972. At the time, it was one of the best Urdu-medium schools in the city. With low fees and trained teachers, it had an enrollment of over a thousand students. It was the first Catholic school in Lahore.

St Francis was one of 17 Catholic schools in Lahore. In 2004, 16 of these schools were denationalized and returned to the church. St Francis was not because the church was not able to prove that it owned the land the school was built on. In 2005, an application was filed in the Lahore High Court for the return of the school to the church. The court ordered the District Coordination Office to resolve the matter within three months. No progress was made.

In May 2013, the City District Government, Lahore, began cutting trees and demolished a boundary wall of the school.

=== Situation till November 2014 ===
In 2014, the school's student population was a few hundred, the main building's ceiling had fallen in, and its grounds bore a desolate look. Few teachers made it to the school.

Teachers and students of the school staged a protest on 12 December 2013, against the Education Department, demanding that the provincial government denationalise their school immediately. They said that Rs 1.6 million had been paid in 2004 for denationalising the school to the department but the department had not yet returned the school.

The parish priest of the area, Fr Andrew Nisari, suggested that the main reason for the non-return of the school to the church is that the land mafia that wants control of the property has influence over the government.

Christians in Pakistan have protested against the government of Punjab over the seizure of Christian property. The Centre for Legal Aid, Assistance and Settlement reported that St Francis High School is the latest in a string of properties to have been taken over by the Punjab government.

Meanwhile, some political leaders in Pakistan assured the Archbishop of Lahore, Sebastian Francis Shaw, that they would respect the rights, property and status of Pakistan's Christian churches. The promise was made by Sardar Ayaz Sadiq, Speaker of the National Assembly of Pakistan.

=== Denationalisation ===
On 5 November 2014, Fr. Nisari announced that the government of Punjab had decided to denationalise the school. The Roman Catholic Archdiocese of Lahore had already being paying the teachers' salaries for the last six months. He added that the building which was in ruins would be knocked down and a new one constructed. On 17 April 2015, Agenzia Fides confirmed that the government had returned it to the Church in November 2014.

== Notable alumni ==
- A. Nayyar

== See also ==
- Catholic Church in Pakistan
- Education in Lahore
- List of educational institutions in Lahore
