= AISS =

AISS may refer to:

- Ahmad Ibrahim Secondary School, a secondary school in Yishun, Singapore
- American International School System, a private coeducational school in Lahore, Pakistan
