= HRPC =

HRPC may stand for:

- Hormone-refractory prostate cancer
- Harlem River and Port Chester Railroad
- HRPC School of Law, Lahore, a law school in Pakistan
