= Punjab University College of Pharmacy =

Pakistani University

- Type: Public, constituent college
- Established: 1944; 82 years ago
- Affiliations: University of the Punjab, Pharmacy Council of Pakistan
- Principal: Syed Atif Raza
- Dean: Nadeem Irfan Bukhari
- Location: Lahore, Punjab, Pakistan
- Nickname: PUCP
- Website: pucp.edu.pk

The Punjab University College of Pharmacy (PUCP) is a constituent college of University of the Punjab located in Lahore, Punjab, Pakistan. It was established in 1944.

== Programs ==
It offers following degree programs:

=== Undergraduate Program ===
- Pharm-D (Doctor of Pharmacy)

=== Postgraduate Programs ===
==== Master of Philosophy Programs ====
- MPhil Pharmaceutics
- MPhil Pharmacognosy
- MPhil Pharmacology
- MPhil Pharmaceutical Chemistry
- MPhil Pharmacy Practice

==== Doctor of Philosophy Programs ====
- PhD Pharmaceutics
- PhD Pharmacognosy
- PhD Pharmacology
- PhD Pharmaceutical Chemistry

== See also ==
- List of pharmacy schools in Pakistan
