= Shaikh Zayed Postgraduate Medical Institute Lahore =

Postgraduate medical institute and hospital complex in Lahore, Pakistan

Shaikh Zayed Postgraduate Medical Institute
- Logo of Shaikh Zayed Medical Complex, Lahore
- Type: Public (Government)
- Established: September 8, 1986
- Chairman: Prof. Dr. Ayesha Humayun
- Location: Lahore, Punjab, Pakistan
- Campus: 55 acres
- Affiliations: Pakistan Medical and Dental Council; University of Health Sciences
- Website: szmc.org.pk

Shaikh Zayed Postgraduate Medical Institute (SZPGMI; شیخ زید پوسٹ گریجویٹ میڈیکل انسٹی ٹیوٹ) is a public medical institution and teaching hospital complex in Lahore, Punjab, Pakistan. It was commissioned on 8 September 1986 as a federal postgraduate medical institute, funded by a donation from Zayed bin Sultan Al Nahyan, the then-President of the United Arab Emirates, and the people of the UAE. The complex is situated near the geographic centre of Lahore and encompasses five institutional components, including Shaikh Zayed Hospital (SZH), which in 2011 became the first public-sector hospital in Pakistan to perform a liver transplant.

== History ==
The Shaikh Zayed Hospital Trust was established on 6 November 1973 by the Government of Pakistan, following an initial donation of Rs 300 million from Zayed bin Sultan Al Nahyan, then-President of the United Arab Emirates. The Government of Pakistan allocated 55 acres of land in Lahore for the project. The complex was commissioned on 8 September 1986 as the Federal Postgraduate Medical Institute and Shaikh Zayed Hospital, Lahore, initially with 360 beds.

On 14 February 2012, the complex was devolved to the Punjab Government. On 22 April 2019 it was retrieved by the federal government and placed under the administrative control of the Cabinet Division.

The Liver Transplant Unit was inaugurated on 27 November 2010, making SZH the first public-sector facility in Pakistan for living-donor liver transplants. The surgical team had undergone specialist training at centres in Hong Kong, Japan, Turkey, South Korea, England, Europe, and China. The first cadaveric liver transplant at SZH was performed on 11 August 2011 and lasted fifteen hours. By 2017, the programme had completed one hundred living-donor liver transplants.

In 2020, the Punjab Human Organ Transplant Authority (PHOTA) shut down the liver transplant facility at SZH pending a high-level inquiry into deaths of patients and donors during the post-operative phase.

== Components ==
Shaikh Zayed Postgraduate Medical Institute comprises five components:

- Shaikh Zayed Hospital (SZH) and National Institute of Kidney Diseases (NIKD)
- Shaikh Khalifa Bin Zayed Al-Nahyan Medical and Dental College (SKZMDC), established 2009
- Federal Postgraduate Medical Institute (FPGMI)
- National Health Research Complex (NHRC)
- Sheikha Fatima Institute of Nursing and Health Sciences (SFIN&HS)

== Clinical services ==
Shaikh Zayed Hospital offers services across more than twenty specialised departments. The hospital has a current bed capacity of 1,031, expanded from 360 beds at commissioning in 1986 and 713 beds in 2004.

Clinical services include:

- Accident and Emergency (24-hour)
- General Surgery and Surgical Oncology
- Gastroenterology (including endoscopy, colonoscopy, and ERCP)
- Liver Transplantation
- Renal Transplantation and Haemodialysis
- Neonatal and Paediatric Intensive Care
- Central Intensive Care Unit (ICU)
- Coronary Care Unit (CCU)
- Cardiology (including angiography, angioplasty, cardiac bypass, valve replacement)
- Pulmonology (including bronchoscopy and lung function testing)
- Physiotherapy and Rehabilitation
- Neurosurgery (including neuroangiography, electromyography, and electroencephalography)
- Plastic and reconstructive surgery
- Dental Surgery
- Orthopaedic Surgery
- Ophthalmology and Otorhinolaryngology
- Paediatric Surgery
- Anaesthesia and Pain Medicine
- Rheumatology, inaugurated 14 March 2017 as the first dedicated indoor facility for autoimmune disease patients at SZH
