= Amina Majeed Malik =

Begum Amina Majeed Malik (1913–2004) was a Pakistani educationist.

== Early life and education ==
Begum Amina Majeed Malik was born in 1913 in Lahore, Pakistan. She received her early education from the Lahore College for Women. She completed her bachelor's degree in teaching (BT) from the Aligarh Muslim University in 1935 and a master's degree in philosophy from the University of Bombay. She married Majid Malik in 1932.

== Career ==
Malik was trained as a journalist in the English language. During British India-era, she was one of the few correspondents for Reuters in India.

In 1955, she founded PECHS School and PECHS College which was later nationalized by the Government of Pakistan. In 2003, it was renamed as the Begum Amina Majeed Malik (BAMM) PECHS Government College for Women to honor her contribution. Her daughter, Nagin Malik, is a former principal of the college.
