= University of Faisalabad =

Private university in Pakistan

Coordinates: 31°29′43.98″N 73°04′25.03″E

- جامعہ فیصل آباد
- Motto: رَبِّ زدْنيِ عِلْماً (Arabic)
- Motto in English: O my Lord! Advance me in Knowledge
- Type: Private University
- Established: 2002
- Affiliations: Higher Education Commission (Pakistan); Pakistan Engineering Council; Pakistan Medical and Dental Council; Pakistan Nursing Council; Pharmacy Council of Pakistan
- Chancellor: Governor of the Punjab
- Rector: Prof. Dr Aman Ullah Malik
- Students: 10000+
- Location: Faisalabad, Punjab, Pakistan
- Campus: Health Sciences Wing : Sargodha Road, Faisalabad(only for girls) Engineering Wing(co-education) : Engineering Wing, West Canal Road, Faisalabad Jinnah Campus(co-education) : Gulberg Thana Rd, Jinnah Colony, Faisalabad
- Colors: Gold; Green; Blue
- Nickname: TUF
- Mascot: TUFIAN
- Website: tuf.edu.pk

The University of Faisalabad (TUF) is a private university located in Faisalabad, Punjab, Pakistan.

It was established in 2002 under the auspices of Madina Foundation, a not for profit philanthropic organization in the light of its founder and the late Chairman Haji Muhammad Saleem's vision of "Industry, Service, Education". It offers programs in Pharmaceutical Sciences, Medicine, Allied Health Sciences, Engineering, Information Technology, Management Studies, Arts and Social Sciences.

== Accreditation ==
All programs of the university are accredited with its respective accreditation councils and the governing bodies of the Government of Pakistan:

- Higher Education Commission of Pakistan (HEC)
- Pakistan Medical and Dental Council (PMDC)
- Pharmacy Council of Pakistan (PCP)
- Pakistan Nursing Council (PNC)
- Pakistan Engineering Council (PEC)

== History of TUF ==
On March 17, 2002, Madinah Foundation launched a project to overcome a deficit of education in Faisalabad district.

== Campuses ==
=== Health Sciences Wing (Only for girls) ===
Health Sciences (females only) wing is located on Sargodha Road, Faisalabad. This wing houses MBBS, BDS, Pharm D, Rehabilitation Sciences, Optometry, Nutritional Sciences, Imaging Sciences, Medical Laboratory Sciences, Dermatological Sciences and Nursing.

=== Engineering Wing (Co-education) ===
Engineering wing is located on the west canal road in the vicinity of the Faisalabad Chamber of Commerce & Industry and National Textile University. This wing houses the Departments of Electrical, Chemical and Civil Engineering, Management Studies and Computational Sciences.

=== Jinnah Campus (Co-education) ===
The university started its third campus, located in Jinnah Colony, Faisalabad. This wing includes the Computer Science and Business Departments.

== Faculties & Departments ==
=== Faculty of Pharmaceutical Sciences ===
- Department of Pharmacy

=== Faculty of Medicine & Allied Health Sciences ===
- School of Nursing
- Department of Pathology
- Department of Optometry
- Department of Dermatology
- Department of Dental Sciences
- Department of Nutrition & Dietetics
- Department of Rehabilitation Sciences
- Department of Radiology & Medical Imaging
- Department of Professional Health Technologies

=== Faculty of Engineering & Technology ===
- Department of Civil Engineering
- Department of Electrical Engineering
- Department of Chemical Engineering
- Department of Engineering Technology

=== Faculty of Law ===
- Bachelor of Law
- Master in Law

=== Faculty of Information Technology ===
- Department of Computational Sciences

=== Faculty of Management Studies ===
- Department of Management Studies
- Department of Aviation Management

=== Faculty of Arts and Social Sciences ===
- Department of Psychology
- Department of Interior Design
- Department of Arabic and Islamic Studies
- Department of English Language & Literature

=== University Medical & Dental College ===
(Affiliated with University of Health Sciences, Lahore)

- Bachelor of Medicine and Bachelor of Surgery (MBBS)
- Bachelor of Dental Surgery (BDS)

Madina Foundation, following the vision of its founder, the late Chairman Mian Muhammad Saleem, established the Medical College in 2003 to fill a vacuum in medical education in Faisalabad. This college is for female students only.

== Students societies ==
- Faith-based society
- Literary society
- Cultural society
- Community services society
- Dramatic society
- Musical society
- Art society
- Publication society
- Sports society
- Blood donor’s society
- Model united nations society
- Photography society
- Adventure society
- Student welfare society
- Character building society
- Rehabilitation society

== Scholarships ==
- Merit-based scholarships
- Alumni scholarship
- Kinship scholarship
- Outstanding sportsmen/women scholarship
- Special person scholarship
- Fatima, Zainab, and Eafuzq scholarships
- Scholarship for SOS Village

== Journal and Publication ==
The University of Faisalabad has been publishing the Journal of University Medical and Dental College (JUMDC), a quarterly peer-evaluated and open access journal indexed by Scopus since 2019.

== FM Tufian: 96.6 ==
The University of Faisalabad has its own Educational Radio Channel FM 96.6 which was launched in 2014. It broadcasts programs related to education, health and social welfare.

== Madina Teaching Hospital ==
Madina Teaching hospital is a General Hospital consists of 600 beds attached to the Saleem Campus.
