= List of law schools in Pakistan =

Location of Pakistan

Legal education in Pakistan had begun before independence and dates back to the 1800s. The first legal education institution was established under the name of the University Law College (now Punjab University Law College) in Lahore in 1868. Currently, law programs are offered by more than 150 institutions, including universities and law colleges. These institutions are regulated by the Pakistan Bar Council (PBC) and Higher Education Commission (HEC).

== Major law schools ==
| Institution | Law school | Founded | Location |
|---|---|---|---|
| University of the Punjab | Punjab University Law College | 1868 | Lahore |
| Lahore University of Management Sciences | Shiekh Ahmad Hassan School of Law | 2004 | Lahore |
| Quaid-i-Azam University | School of Law | 2013 | Islamabad |
| International Islamic University, Islamabad | Faculty of Sharia and Law | 1980 started from Quaid i Azam University | Islamabad |
| University of Karachi | School of Law | | Karachi |
| Sindh Muslim Government Law College | | 1947 | Karachi |
| University of Sargodha | Department of Law | | Sargodha |
| University of Management and Technology, Lahore | School of Law and Policy | | Lahore |
| Bahria University, Islamabad | Bahria University Law School | | Islamabad |
| University of Malakand | Department of Law | 2002 | Chakdara, Lower Dir |
| Islamia College University, Peshawar | Department of Shariah and Law | 2008 | Peshawar |
| University of Peshawar | Khyber Law College | 1950 | Peshawar |
| University of Peshawar | College of Legal Studies | 2025 | Peshawar |
| Government College University, Faisalabad, Pakistan | Faculty of Law | | Faisalabad |
| Muhammad Ali Jinnah Law College | | | Gujranwala |
| Gomal University, Dera Ismail Khan | Law College | | Dera Ismail Khan |
| Hamdard University, Karachi | Faculty of Law | | Karachi |
| University of Balochistan | University Law College | 1971 | Quetta |
| Hazara University, Mansehra | Department of Law | | Mansehra |
| Islamia University, Bahawalpur | Department of Law | | Bahawalpur |
| Shah Abdul Latif University | | | Khairpur |
| University of Azad Jammu & Kashmir, Muzaffarabad | | | Muzaffarabad |
| University of Gujrat | | | Gujrat |

== Law schools in Pakistan ==
=== Islamabad Federal Capital Territory ===
- School of Law, Quaid i Azam University
- S3H, National University of Sciences and Technology

=== Balochistan ===
- University Law College, Quetta
- City School of Law, Quetta
- Jhalawan Law College, Khuzdar
- Zarghoon Law College, Quetta
- National Law College(NIHE), Quetta

=== Khyber Pakhtunkhwa ===
- College of Legal Studies Peshawar
- Abdul Wali Khan University Mardan
- Gomal University, Dera Ismail Khan
- University of Malakand, Department of Law
- Frontier Law College, Dera Ismail Khan
- Luqman College of Law, Dera Ismail Khan
- Abraham Lincoln School of Law, Bannu
- Hazara University, Mansehra
- Saani Islamia Law College, Haripur
- Khyber Law College, University of Peshawar, Peshawar
- Abbott Law College, Abbottabad
- Abbott Law College, Mansehra
- Ayub Law College, Haripur, Pakistan
- Centre for Studies in Law and Democracy, Peshawar
- Frontier Law College, Peshawar
- Institute of Legal Studies, Peshawar
- Islamia Law College, Peshawar
- Jinnah Law College, Peshawar
- Justice Law College, Abbottabad
- Kohat Law College, Kohat
- Mardan Law College, Mardan
- Muslim Law College, Swat District
- Peshawar Law College, Peshawar
- Quaid-e-Azam Institute of Legal Studies, Nowshera, Khyber Pakhtunkhwa
- Supreme Law College, Peshawar
- Swabi Law College, Swabi

=== Punjab ===
- Punjab University Law College, University of The Punjab
- Al-Jinnah Institute for Law, Sargodha
- Unified Law College, Chiniot
- Muhammad Ali Jinnah Law College, Gujranwala
- School of Law and Policy, University of Management and Technology, Lahore
- University of Lahore (Postgraduate Institute of Law), Lahore
- Muhammad Iqbal Law School GCU Lahore
- Kinnaird Law School, Lahore
- Bahauddin Zakariya University, Multan
- Royal Law College, Burewala
- Quaid-e-Azam Law College, Sargodha
- Multan Law College, Multan
- Multan Law College, D.G. Khan
- Jinnah Law College, D.G. Khan
- Supreme Law College, Multan
- Noor Law College, Multan
- INEX Law Academy, Multan
- Islamia University Bahawalpur
- Royal Law College, Bahawalnagar
- Bahawalpur Law College, Bahawalpur
- Millat Law College, Bahawalpur
- AIPS Law college, Bahawalpur
- Ali Law College, Rahimyar Khan
- Jinnah Muslim Law College, Islamabad
- Lahore University of Management Sciences, School of Humanities, Social Sciences & Law, Lahore
- University of the Punjab (Affiliated Colleges)
  - Al-Jinnah Institute for Law, Sargodha
  - Royal Law College, Arifwala
  - Quaid-e-Azam Law College, Lahore
  - Cornelius Law College, Sargodha
  - Allama Iqbal Law College, Sialkot
  - City Law College, Lahore
  - HRPC School of Law, Lahore
  - The Institute of Legal Studies (TILS), Lahore
  - Gujrat Law College, Gujrat
  - Lahore School of Law, Lahore
  - Hamayat Islam Law College, Lahore
  - Jinnah Law College, Jhelum
  - CIMS School of Law, Lahore
  - Toppers Law College, Lahore
  - Lyallpur Law College, Faisalabad
  - Muhammad Ali Jinnah Law College, Gujranwala
  - Muhammadan Law College, Sheikhupura
  - Muslim Law College, Rawalpindi
  - National Institute of legal studies Attock
  - Quaid-e-Azam Law College, Okara
  - Pakistan College of Law, Lahore
  - Leads Law College, Lahore
  - Punjab Law College, Lahore
  - Rawalpindi Law College, Rawalpindi
  - Jandanwala College of Law, Kharian
  - Justice Inn Law College, Narowal

=== Azad Kashmir ===
- University of Azad Jammu & Kashmir, Muzaffarabad
- Mirpur University of Sciences and Technology, Law School, Mirpur
- University of Kotli, Kotli
- Kashmir Law College
- Techera Law College

=== Sindh ===
- Indus College Of Law, Hyderabad
- Denning Law School, Karachi [LLB (Hons.) of University of London] https://www.denninglawschool.com/
- Ziauddin University Faculty of Law https://zfl.zu.edu.pk/
- Themis School of Law, Karachi [LLB (Hons.) of University of London], Bar Transfer Test,
- Shaheed Zulfiqar Ali Bhutto Institute of Science and Technology
- L'ecole for Advanced Studies, Karachi
- Dadabhoy Institute of Higher Education, Karachi
- Federal Urdu University, Karachi
- Hamdard University, Karachi
- Shah Abdul Latif University, Khairpur
  - Govt. ABD Law College, Sukkur
  - Govt. Law College, Khairpur
  - Govt. Shaheed Benazir Bhutto Law College, Larkana
  - Haji Moula Bux Law College, Shikarpur, Sindh
  - Law College, Ghotki
  - Law College, Naushahro Feroze
  - Sardar Noor Muhammad Khan Bijarani Law College, Kandhkot
- University of Karachi, Karachi
  - Islamia Law College, Karachi
  - Sindh Muslim Law College, Karachi
- University of Sindh, Jamshoro
- Sindh Mehran Institute of Law (SMIL), Jamshoro
  - Govt. Hyderabad Sindh Law College, Hyderabad, Sindh
  - Govt. Jinnah Law college, Hyderabad, Sindh
  - Govt. Pir Illahi Bux Law College, Dadu, Pakistan
  - Law College, Mirpur Khas
  - Quaid-e-Azam Law College (Estd. Since 1998), affiliated University of Sindh, Jamshoro Pakistan, Nawabshah, Shaheed BenazirAbad
  - Bilawal Bhutto Zardari Law College, Kambar Qambar Shahdadkot District
- Everest Law College, Hyderabad, Sindh
- HUB law college, Jamshoro

== LLB awarding bodies ==
The following universities are authorized to award law degrees in Pakistan:

- Punjab University, Lahore
- University of Management and Technology, Lahore
- University of Sindh, Sindh
- University of Gujrat, Punjab
- Quaid-i-Azam University, Islamabad
- GC University, Faisalabad
- Govt SM Law College University Of Karachi, Karachi
- University of Peshawar, Khyber Pakhtunkhwa
- University of Malakand, Khyber Pakhtunkhwa
- Swat University, Khyber Pakhtunkhwa
- Hazara University, Khyber Pakhtunkhwa
- University of Sindh, Hyderabad
- University of Balochistan, Quetta
- Bahauddin Zakaria University, Multan
- Superior University, Lahore
- University Of Lahore
- Gomal University, Dera Ismail Khan
- GC University, Lahore
- Shah Abdul Latif University, Khairpur
- Islamia University, Bhawalpur
- Hamdard University, Karachi
- Kinnaird College for Women University, Lahore
- International Islamic University, Islamabad
- Sargodha University, Sargodha
- LUMS, Lahore
- Islamia College University, Peshawar
- Bahria University, Islamabad
- University of Karachi, Karachi
- Federal Urdu University, Karachi
- Shah Abdul Latif University, Khairpur

== See also ==
- Bachelor of Laws: Pakistan
- Doctor of Law: Pakistan
- Law of Pakistan
- List of universities in Pakistan
- Lists of law schools
- Master of Laws: Pakistan
