= Dar-ul-Mussarat, Lahore =

Pakistani chain of special education centers

Location
- Lahore, Punjab; Pakistan

Information
- Established: 1990; 35 years ago
- Founder: Khushnud Mussarat Azariah

Dar-ul-Mussarat Lahore (DUML) is a chain of special education centers for intellectually disabled children in Lahore, Punjab, Pakistan. It was established in December 1990 by Khushnud Mussarat Azariah, wife of Bishop Samuel Robert Azariah.

The main campus of Dar-ul-Mussarat is in the Diocesan compound on Waris Road, along with St. Peter's High School.

Dar-ul-Musarrat Lahore is a daycare center for training and development of intellectually disabled children. The main focus is to provide every opportunity to disabled children to be independent in their living activities. Under the supervision of Mrs. Resha Qadir Bakhsh (specially trained in Japan), the staff of 17 well-trained teachers help these children in developing awareness of their presence in this society. Dar-ul-Musarrat caters with the following disabilities:

- Intellectual disability
- Down syndrome
- Cerebral palsy
- Autism

Physiotherapy services are also provided

== See also ==
- List of special education institutions in Lahore
