= Imran Masood (Pakistani politician) =

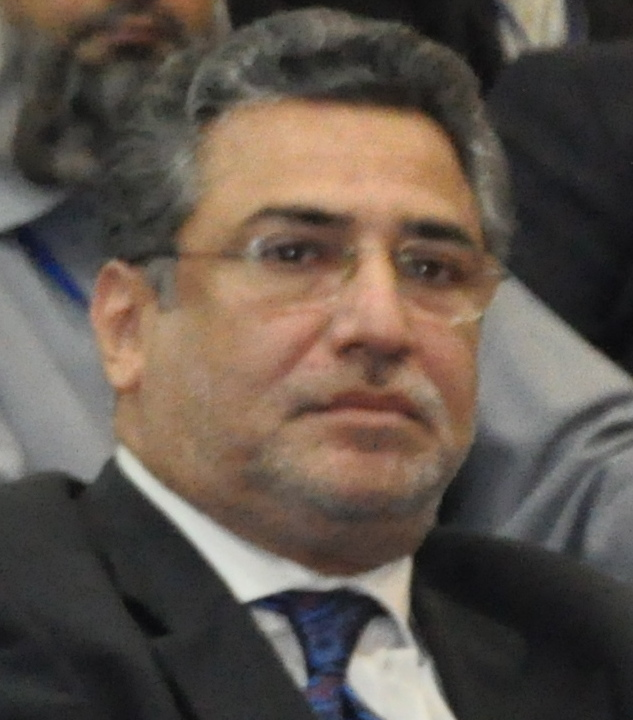
Imran Masood

Imran Masood is a politician and former provincial minister from Pakistan. He is a former education minister in the Punjab government.

== Career ==
He is a senior parliamentarian who has held many important positions in the Government of Pakistan. He has been involved in the policy making as being the elected member of the provincial assembly Punjab, Pakistan holding different portfolios in different times. His focus has been in the areas of Education, Health, Human Rights, Women Empowerment, Environment, Culture and Heritage.

Mian Imran Masood also made a policy for the quality enhancement and research in the education Institutes. Higher Education Commission was promoted and strengthened in his time to monitor the universities of Pakistan. Currently he is the Vice Chancellor of The University of South Asia Lahore, Pakistan, the Chairman of Gandhara Association of Art and Culture, Pakistan and spokesperson of the Association of Private Sector Universities in Punjab (APSUP).
