= Rising Sun Institute =

Education center in Pakistan

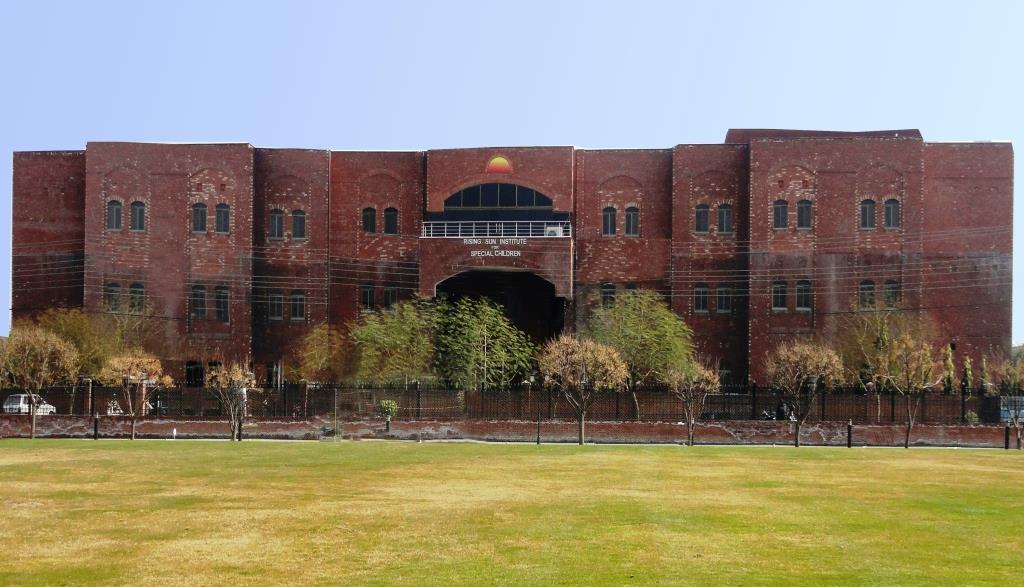

Information
- Established: 1984; 42 years ago
- Founders: Abdul Tawwab Khan; Parveen Abdul Tawwab

Rising Sun Institute for Special Children (RSISC), established in 1984 by Abdul Tawwab Khan and Parveen Abdul Tawwab, is a special education center for mentally and physically disabled children in Lahore, Punjab, Pakistan.

It has two campuses located in DHA and Mughalpura. Rising Sun Institute is a project of “Rising Sun Education and Welfare Society” a not-for-profit and charity-based organization, working for the welfare of special children. It is the largest Institute for special education in Pakistan providing education, vocational & computer training, physio, hydro, speech therapy and various other forms of rehabilitation facilities to more than 600 children. These children have a variety of disabilities including intellectual disabilities, visual impairments, autism, and cerebral palsy. The services rendered include individualized education programs, free transportation, games, sports and cultural activities. These activities are an integral part of the total program.

== History ==
Rising Sun Education & Welfare Society is working in the field of special education since 1984.

== See also ==
- List of special education institutions in Lahore
