= 2012 Farooqi Girls' High School attack =

2012 incident in Pakistan

- Location: Lahore, Pakistan
- Date: 30 October 2012 (14 years ago)
- Target: Farooqi Girls' High School
- Attack type: protesters
- Injuries
- Motive: allegedly blasphemous material
- Inquiry: school cleared of all allegations (see prose)

On 30 October 2012, Farooqi Girls' High School in Lahore, Pakistan, was attacked by angry protesters due to allegedly blasphemous material. Police investigated and said that it was not true and the school was cleared of all allegations. It started working as usual 90 days after the incident.

== Event history ==
In November 2012, a judicial body in Pakistan denied bail to Asim Farooqi, the principal of a school embroiled in a controversy involving alleged blasphemous content in a homework assignment, said to have disrespected Muhammad. Farooqi, aged 77, said he had no direct involvement, the court mandated a 14-day remand on blasphemy charges, an offence punishable by the death penalty.

Amidst the uproar, one of Farooqi's teachers, Arfa Iftikhar, went into clandestinity following an aggressive demonstration at the Farooqi Girls' High School, located in Lahore, instigated by her issuance of the contentious homework.

== School history ==
Farooqi Girls High School was established in 1978, by Arshad Ali Asim Farooqi and his wife Zahida Asim Farooqi. It is located in Karim Park, Ravi Road, Lahore, Pakistan.

== See also ==
- Crime in Pakistan
- List of school attacks
- List of schools in Pakistan
