= Qarshi University =

Qarshi University جامعۂ قرشی
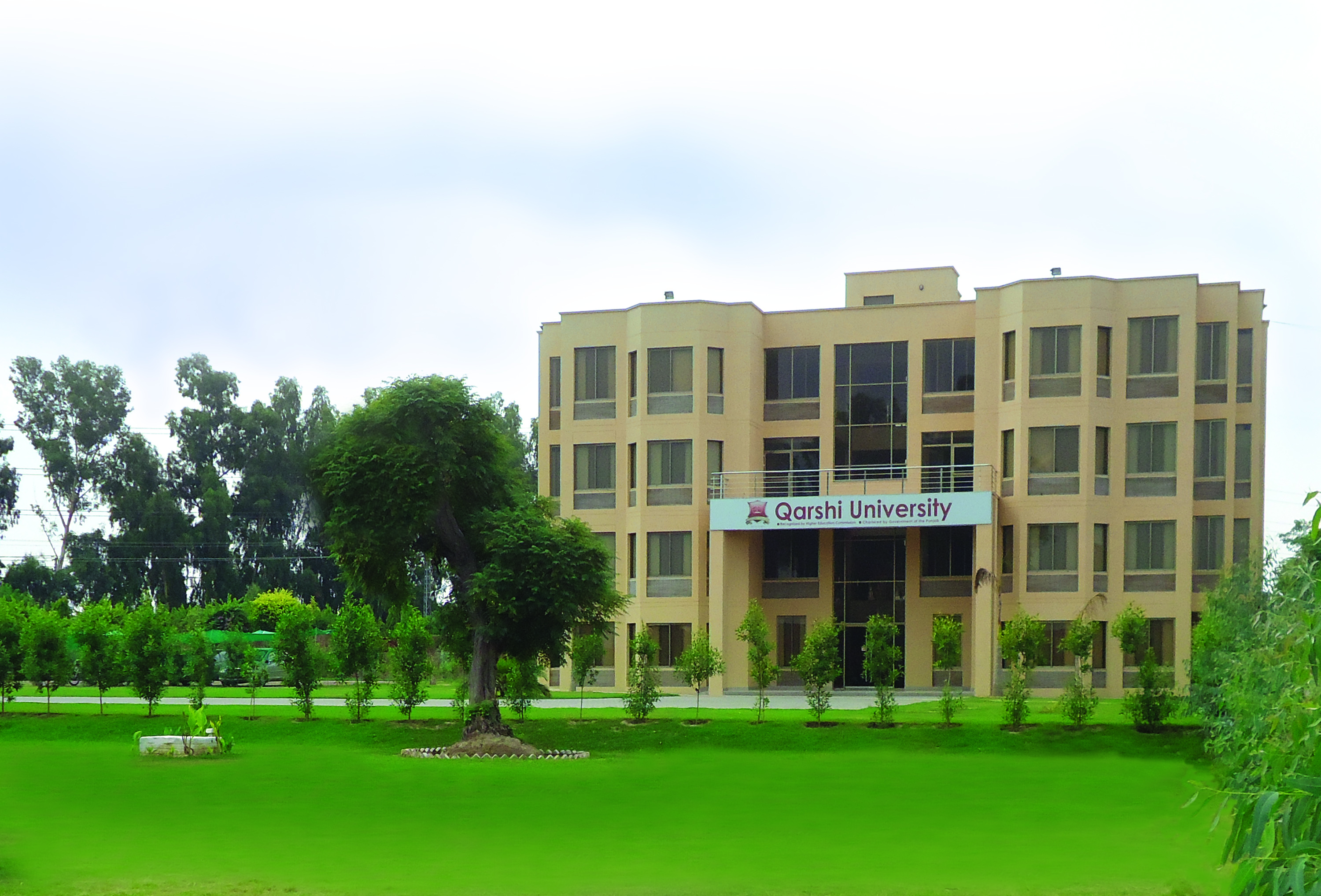
- Qarshi University
- Type: Private
- Established: July 10, 2011
- Affiliations: Higher Education Commission of Pakistan (HEC); National Council for Tibb
- Chairman: Iqbal Ahmed Qarshi
- Vice-Chancellor: Dr. Mansoor Sarwar
- Academic staff: 60
- Administrative staff: 35
- Students: 350
- Location: Lahore, Punjab, Pakistan
- Campus: Urban
- Nickname: QU
- Website: http://www.qu.edu.pk

Qarshi University (QU) is a project of Qarshi Foundation; a non-profit welfare organization funded by the Qarshi family. It was established in 2011. It is recognized by the Higher Education Commission of Pakistan.

== Departments ==
- Department of Pharmacy
- Department of Eastern Medicine & Allied Health Sciences
- Department of Science
- Department of Management Sciences
- Department of Computer Sciences & Information Technology
- Department of Biotechnology
