= Imperial College of Business Studies =

Coordinates: 31.3986°N 74.1696°E

Imperial University
- Type: Education and Research
- Established: 1991
- Affiliations: HEC
- Location: Lahore, Punjab, Pakistan
- Campus: Urban
- Website: www.imperial.edu.pk

Imperial University is a higher education institute in Lahore, Pakistan that offers programs in disciplines including Engineering, Management Sciences, Computing, Information Technology, Applied Technology, Social Sciences, Natural Sciences, Commerce, Medicine, Architecture and Fashion Designing.

== History ==
The university was established in 1991 by the Pakistan Benevolence & Social Management Trust. The initial development of IU was supported by academic collaboration with the University of Hull, UK. In 2002, ICBS was chartered by the Govt. of Punjab as independent degree awarding institution (Imperial University Ordinance, 2013).

== Academics ==
- School of Business, Economics and Management Sciences
- School of Computing and Information Sciences
- School of Engineering and Technology
- School of Architecture, Art and Design
- Faculty of Health & Allied Sciences
- Department of English Language and Literature

== See also ==
- List of universities in Pakistan
