= University of South Asia (Pakistan) =

- Motto: Converting Man Power into Mind Power
- Type: Private
- Established: 1987
- Affiliations: HEC, PBC, PCP, PCATP
- Chairman: Mahmood Sadiq
- Vice-Chancellor: Mian Imran Masood
- Location: Lahore, Punjab, Pakistan
- Campus: Cantt., Burki and Raiwind
- Colors: Blue and white
- Website: www.usa.edu.pk

The University of South Asia (Urdu: جامعہ جنوبی ایشیا) or USA is a private university located in Lahore, Punjab, Pakistan. It was established in 1987 as a computer training institution with the name of National College of Computer Sciences (NCCS). More than 100,000 students underwent training programs in Computer Sciences. It was developed to promote computer education but has expanded to provide chartered degrees in fields that include Business Studies, Culinary Sciences, Allied Health Sciences, Civil Engineering, Electrical Engineering, Architecture, Information Technology, Law, Media Studies, Physical Therapy, Nutrition, and Fashion and Interior Design.

All undergraduate and graduate programs at the university are recognized by the Higher Education Commission of Pakistan and all the respective regulatory bodies. As a chartered university, all degrees awarded are internationally recognized.

The university has three campuses:

- Cantt. Campus: 47 Tufail Road, Lahore Cantt
- Raiwind Road Campus: 5 km from Thokar Niaz Baig
- Burki Campus: Barki Road

The Vice Chancellor of the university is Ex-Minister of Education, Punjab Mian Imran Masood.

== History ==
The Sadiq Memorial Educational Society established a chain of National Colleges of Computer Science throughout the country to offer computer science programs. The Bachelor of Computer Science program was launched in 1992 and Intermediate with Computer Science was introduced in 1994. In 1995, MBA and MCS programs were launched. The National Group of Colleges established a chartered degree-awarding higher education institution called the Institute of South Asia on April 14, 2003, vide “The Institute of South Asia, Lahore, Ordinance 2003, Punjab Ordinance No. IV of 2003”. The institute was upgraded to the status of a university on July 9, 2005, vide “The University Of South Asia, Lahore ACT 2005 ”, with the Chief Minister of the Punjab inaugurating the University of South Asia.

== Departments ==
- The Faculty of Management Sciences offers Bachelor and master's degree in Business Administration, HR, Supply Chain and Logistics, Digital Marketing. The department aims to offer the latest and most up to date curriculum with project based learning to help students apply the concepts, allowing them to internalize the knowledge received. With a vibrant clubs and societies culture, students learn in and out of Classes for holistic personality development. Students are also offered support in Admissions abroad.
- The Department of Architecture offers a five-year degree program Bachelor in Architecture Design (B. Arch). Students are given a license number from PCATP on the completion of the degree.
- The Department of Biotechnology and Agro Sciences offers the program Bachelor in Biotechnology and Agro Sciences.
- The Department of Building and Architecture program combines architecture, management and technology.
- The Department of Civil Engineering offers a bachelor's and master's degree in civil engineering. Students who meet the requirements of the degree are given a PEC Number by Pakistan Engineering Council.
- The Department of Computer Sciences offers a bachelor's and master's degree in computer science, software engineering, information technology, robotics and ITC. Students learn with hands-on approach and are encouraged to work in projects from semester 1. With ample developmental opportunities, students enhanced their knowledge and soft skills to become successful graduates.
- The Department of Electrical Engineering offers an undergraduate and graduate degree in Electrical Engineering. Students who meet the requirements of the degree are given a PEC Number by Pakistan Engineering Council.
- The Department of Technology offers bachelor of Civil Technology, bachelor of Electrical Technology and bachelor of Mechanical Technology
- The Department of Fashion Design offers a Bachelor and Master's in Fashion Design, Interior Design, and Textile Design. With a vibrant environment, students are encouraged to express their individual aesthetics and refine their design thinking.
- The Department of Health Sciences offers the degrees of Bachelor of Nutrition & Dietetics and Doctor of Physiotherapy.
- The School of Law offers a 5-year joint degree programme of Bachelors and LL.B, with three specializations, which are all 'qualifying', letting students to proceed straight onto the professional stage of training to become a lawyer.
- Media Studies
- The Department of Career Counseling and Placement Center offers students academic and career guidance to help them make informed decisions. The department offers seminars for students and outsiders seeking to develop their skill sets.
