= NUR International University =

Pakistani private university

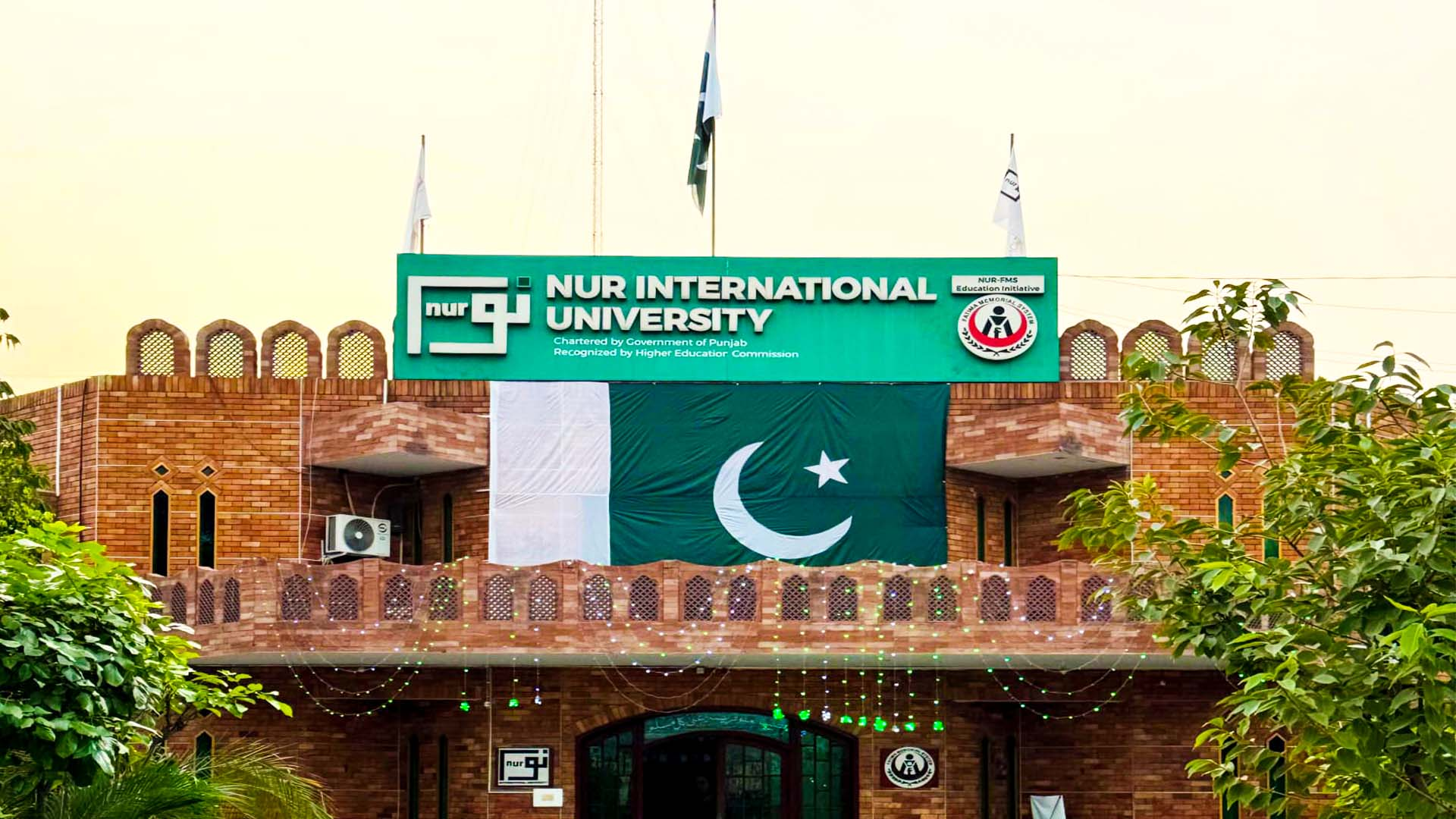
- NUR International University Main Campus
- Type: Private
- Established: 2015
- Affiliations: HEC
- Chairman: Ms. Shahima Rehman
- Vice-Chancellor: Mr. Salem Rehman
- Pro Vice Chancellor: Dr. Farooq Anwar
- Academic staff: 175
- Administrative staff: 80
- Location: Lahore, Punjab, Pakistan
- Campus: 5 Acres; Urban
- Website: niu.edu.pk
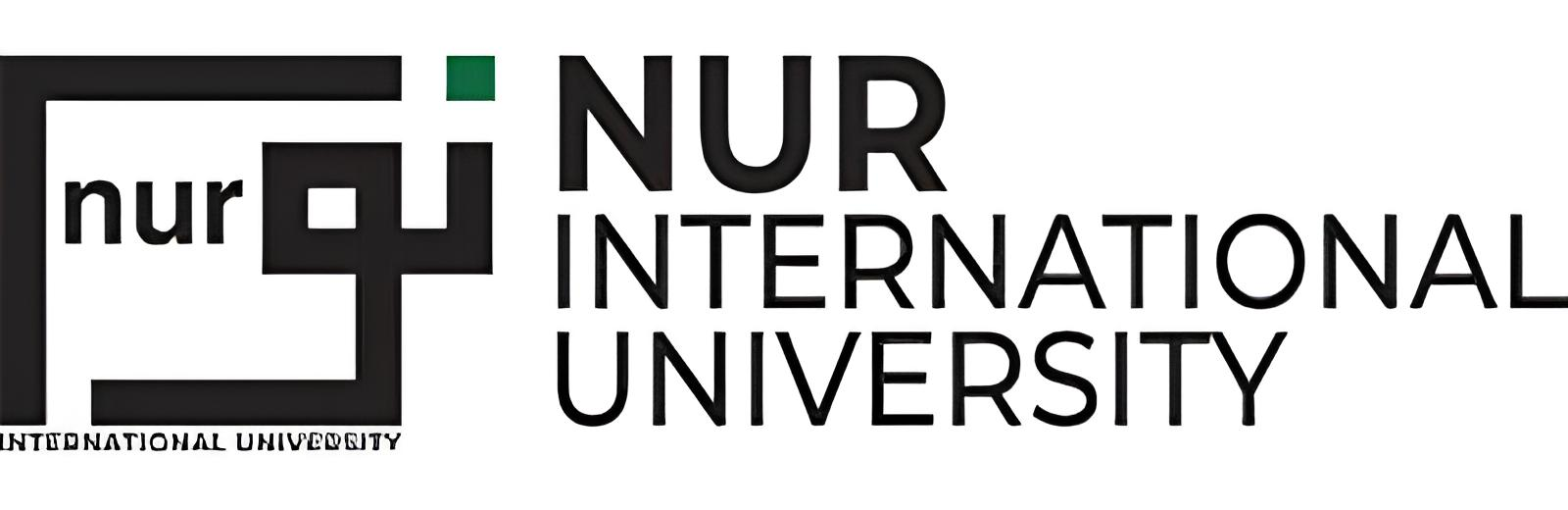

NUR International University (NIU) is a private, non-profit university. The university was founded in 2015 through a charter from the Punjab Government.

The university was established by NUR Foundation, a non-governmental organization based in Pakistan that works on projects pertaining to social development, education, and healthcare. The university offers undergraduate and graduate programs in Applied Sciences, Basic Sciences, Nursing and Allied Health Sciences, Arts and Humanities, and Management Sciences.

The curriculum at NIU is based upon HEC requirements and guidelines.

== Background and History ==
The establishment of NUR International University is the result of the charitable efforts by Alhaj Maulvi Ferozuddin in 1917, leading towards the work of Dr. Abdul Waheed and Begum Saida Waheed.

By combining multidisciplinary education with community development and healthcare, NIU was established to further the goals of NUR-FMS. Its founding stems from more than a century of community service. The institution represents a collaborative environment for education, health, and public policy by being a part of a network that also includes the FMH College of Medicine and Dentistry and Fatima Memorial Hospital.

=== Civic Engagement and Academics ===
NIU has been involved in a variety of academic and public endeavors since its founding. It participated in civic health initiatives like Healthy Pakistan, Progressive Pakistan in 2018. It also participated in national gatherings like The News Education Expo in 2024. Events like the 2016 NUR-FMS Gala in Lahore have also brought attention to the organization's role in promoting community outreach and scholarly discourse.

By 2025, NIU's expanding influence in the national conversation on education and leadership development was demonstrated by its appearances in prestigious educational journals including The News and Business Recorder.

=== Mission and Institutional Structure ===
Within the NUR-FMS framework, NIU is closely associated with academic and healthcare institutions and places emphasis on interdisciplinary research, policy involvement, and healthcare integration. The goal of the university's curriculum is to generate professionals who can help address Pakistan's social and developmental issues.

== Faculties & Programs ==
| Faculty | School/Department | Program/s |
|---|---|---|
| Faculty of Applied Sciences | NUR School of Nutritional Sciences | BS Nutrition Science MS. Food, Nutrition and Dietetics |
| Faculty of Applied Sciences | NUR Institute of Food Science | Bs Food Science Technology Bs Hospitality and Tourism Management MS Food Science Technology |
| Faculty of Nursing & Allied Health Sciences | Department of Diagnostic Science | BS Medical Lab Technology BS Medical Imaging Technology |
| Faculty of Nursing & Allied Health Sciences | Department of Medical and Surgical Ancillary Science | Bs Renal Technology BS Healthcare Analytics BS Emergency and Intensive Care Sciences BS Dental Technology BS Operation Theater Technology BS Optometry |
| Faculty of Nursing & Allied Health Sciences | Department of Physical Therapy | MS Physical Therapy Doctor of Physical Therapy (DPT) |
| Faculty of Nursing & Allied Health Sciences | Department of Nursing | BS Nursing |
| Faculty of Arts, Humanities and Social Sciences | Department of Psychology | BS Clinical Psychology MS Clinical Psychology (Gulberg) |
| Faculty of Management Sciences | NUR School of Management | Bs in Digital Marketing Bachelor of Business Administration (MBA) BS Business Data Analytics & AI Masters of Business Administration (MBA) |
| Faculty of Management Sciences | NUR School of Aviation Management | BS Aviation Management |
| Faculty of Basic Sciences | Faculty of Basic Sciences | MPhil in Biochemistry |
| Faculty of Basic Sciences | Department of Physiology | MPhil in Physiology |

=== School of Nutritional Sciences ===
NUR School of Nutritional Sciences is a constituent school of the university in Lahore. The department was established in 2015 to develops skills in:

- Preventive Nutrition
- Therapeutic nutrition
- Relevant biological & physical sciences
- Nutrients, human health, and human behaviors

Through its degree programs and research, the school is engaged in providing awareness related to public health issues of malnutrition and medical nutrition therapy in diseases.
