= Beaconhouse-Newlands =

- Lahore; Pakistan

Information
- Funding type: MPPG
- Headmaster: Philip Armstrong
- Grades: Pre Nursery-11
- Gender: Co-Education
- Language: English
- Houses: Ranikot (Green); Rohtas (Blue); Baltit (Yellow); Sandeman (Orange); MPPG (Red)
- Qualification: GCE, IB
- Website: beaconhousenewlands.net

Beaconhouse-Newlands is a private boarding school currently operating in Pakistan and Malaysia. The institution is part of the Beaconhouse School System and was formed through collaboration with the Newlands School in Seaford, England in 2011.

It is a group of private fee-paying academic institutions in 3 cities in Pakistan. Beaconhouse provides preschool education, primary education, secondary education and preparation for the international International General Certificate of Secondary Education (IGCSE) and local Secondary School Certificate (SSC) examinations along with International Baccalaureate (IB) Program.

== A-Level subjects ==
- Accounting
- AICT
- Art and Design
- Biology
- Business Studies
- Chemistry
- Computer Science
- Economics
- English Literature
- Environmental Management (AS Level)
- Global Perspective
- Government and Politics
- History
- Law
- Mathematics
- Media Studies
- Physics
- Psychology
- Sociology
- Sundiology
- Urdu
- General Paper
- Thinking Skills

== The Learning Tower ==
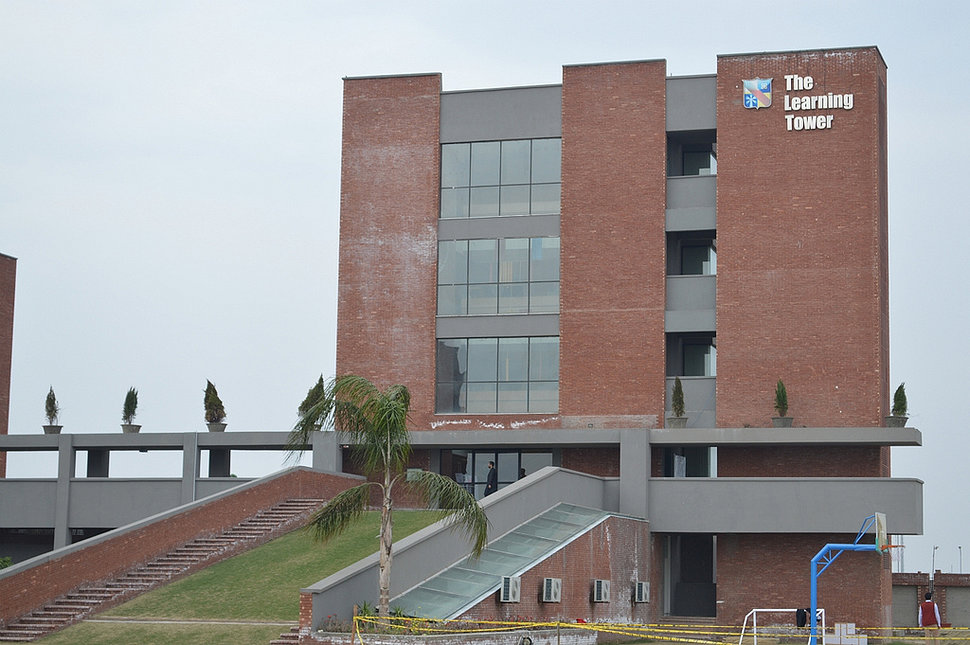
The Learning Tower, library at Beaconhouse-Newlands.

The Learning Tower is a four-story glass and concrete building at the Lahore Beaconhouse-Newlands campus. The Learning Tower has more than 15,000 books in different genres and access to a huge amount of global e-books available online.

== Clubs and Societies ==
- The Drama Club
- Media and Photography
- Music Society
- Community Work
- Orator's Den Club
- Cooking Club
- Mandarin Club
- Public Speaking Club
- Sagheer Fan Club
- Crafts & Design Club
- How we express our self Club
- Calligraphy Club
- Digital Storytelling Club
- Self Defence Club
- Yama Lopo Club
- Environmental Club
- TED-Ed Club
- Wordsmith Club
- Math's and Mind Games Club
- Robotics Club
- U-Block Moaning Club
- STEAM Club
- ادب اور آداب
- Scouting Club
- Debates Club
- Tech and Design Club

== Sporting Facilities ==
1. Football
2. Cricket
3. Basketball
4. Volleyball
5. Martial Arts
6. Badminton
7. Table Tennis
8. Gymnastic
9. Aerobics
10. Kids Athletics
11. Athletics
12. Swimming

Facilities at BN and Sports Complex

1. Swimming pool
2. Football field
3. Basketball court
4. Cricket pitch
5. Volleyball court
6. Indoor Gymnasium for Multi-Sports
7. Fitness Suite

Bedian Sports Complex

1. Cricket Ground and Football ground with Pavilion
2. 400m eight-lane Athletics track
3. 2 Basketball Courts
4. Horse Riding Club
