= Maktabkhana =

Maktabkhana, maktab-khana or maktab khana (Classical Persian: مکتبخانه maktabkhāna; Azerbaijani: məktəbxana; Turkish: mektephane; Urdu: مکتب خانہ; Uzbek: maktabxona) may refer to:

- Kuttab (old-fashioned elementary school) in Iran, the Republic of Azerbaijan and Uzbekistan
- A writing house, writing chamber or clerks' house in the Mughal Empire, notably:
  - Maktab Khana (Fatehpur Sikri), established by the Mughal emperor Akbar as a bureau of translation in Fatehpur Sikri around 1574
  - Maktab Khana (Lahore), part of Lahore Fort
