= National College of Business Administration and Economics =

Private university located in Lahore, Pakistan

- logo
- Motto: Education For Success
- Type: Private
- Established: 1994; 27 years ago
- Chancellor: Governor of the Punjab
- Rector: Prof. Dr. Muhammad Saleem Khan
- Location: Lahore, Punjab, Pakistan
- Colors: Purple, Yellow & Green
- Nickname: NCBAE
- Website: ncbae.edu.pk

The National College of Business Administration and Economics (NCBAE) is a private university located in Lahore, Punjab, Pakistan.

== Schools ==
Currently, NCBA&E has two schools and one faculty of Social Sciences. These cover several disciplines and programs of undergraduate, graduate, and post-graduate studies.

- Faculty of Business Administration.
- Faculty of Computer Sciences
- Faculty of Social Sciences

== Academic courses ==
The NCBAE was founded in 1994. The disciplines offered are Business Studies, Computer Science, Software Engineering, Telecommunication, Human Resource Management, Multimedia Arts, Fine Arts, Environmental Management, Mathematics and Social Sciences. It offers undergraduate and post graduate degrees. Its main campus is located in Lahore and sub-campuses in Multan, Bahawalpur and Rahim Yar Khan.

== Government-recognized and listed institution ==
National College of Business Administration and Economics is ranked number 2 and listed on the Higher Education Commission (Pakistan) website in their 'Business Education' section.

== Campuses ==
- Main campus at Lahore, Pakistan
- Sub-campus at Multan
- Sub-campus at Bahawalpur
- Sub-campus at Gujrat
- Sub-campus at Rahim Yar Khan
