= Shaikh Zayed Hospital, Lahore =

Hospital in Lahore, Pakistan

Shaikh Zayed Hospital, Lahore SZHL شیخ زید ہسپتال لاہور

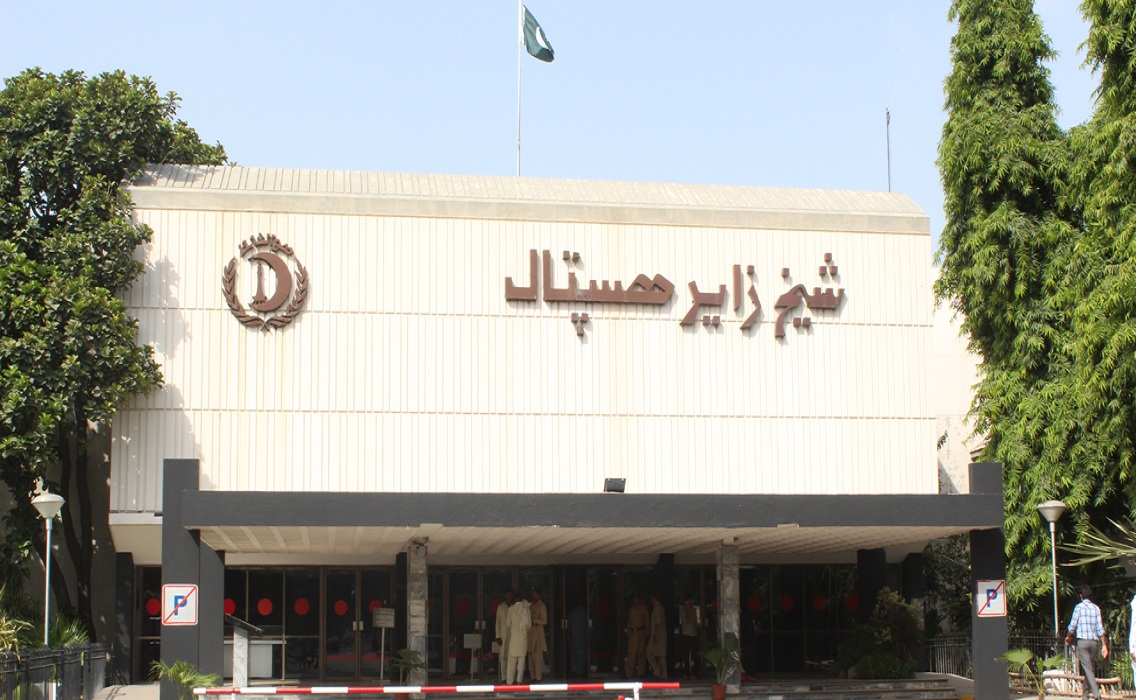
- Main Building of Shaikh Zayed Hospital Lahore

- Location within Pakistan

Geography
- Location: Lahore, Punjab, Pakistan
- Coordinates: 31°30′30″N 74°18′31″E

Organisation
- Care system: Tertiary care
- Type: Teaching Hospital (Government of Pakistan)
- Affiliated university: College of Physicians and Surgeons of Pakistan; University of Health Sciences Lahore

Services
- Beds: 1030

History
- Founded: 1986

Links
- Website: Official Website

Shaikh Zayed Hospital, Lahore (Urdu: شیخ زید ہسپتال لاہور) is a tertiary care Hospital located in Lahore, Punjab, Pakistan. It is attached with Shaikh Khalifa Bin Zayed Al-Nahyan Medical and Dental College as a teaching hospital and is part of Shaikh Zayed Postgraduate Medical Institute Lahore.

== History ==
The hospital was started as a donation from Shaikh Zayed bin Sultan Al Nahyan and people of United Arab Emirates. It was commissioned on 8 September 1986.

In 2010, a liver transplant center was established at the hospital.

== Facilities Available ==
- Accident & Emergency 24/7
- Department of General Surgery and Surgical Oncology (Providing a complete range of General Surgical and Cancer Surgery Services for all Solid Organ Cancers)
- Liver Transplantation
- Renal Transplantation and Renal Haemodialysis.
- Central Intensive Care Unit (ICU) with Central Oxygen and Suction System
- Coronary Care Unit (CCU) Facilities
- Angiography, Angioplasty, Cardiac Bypass, Heart Valves Replacement and all sorts of Cardiac Operations and procedures
- Physiotherapy and Manual therapy on both indoor and outdoor basis
- Radio Isotope Cardiology, Thallium Scan, Echocardiography
- Radiotherapy
- Latest Physiotherapy Equipment, Rehabilitation Center and Orthopaedic Workshop
- Neuroangiography, Electromyography (EMG), Electroencephalography (EEG) and all kind of sophisticated Neurosurgical operations
- Operations of Plastic Surgery and cosmetology Lip Augmentation, Rhioplasty)
- Operations of Fascio-maxillary, Jaw and Dental Surgery
- All kinds of Orthopaedic Operations
- All kind of Eye and Otorhinolaryngology Operations
- Surgical Operations of all kind for neonates, children, young and old patients
- Rheumatology Dept. The first dedicated indoor facility for patients suffering from auto-immune disease was inaugurated at Shaikh Zayed Hospital Lahore on Wednesday 14-Mar-2017.
