= Amin Maktab =

Special education center

Amin Maktab, established in 1961, is a special education center for mentally disabled children in Gulberg, Lahore, Punjab, Pakistan. It is the oldest institution in Lahore for intellectually disabled children.

== History ==
Amin Maktab School was established in a small rented building in October 1961 by the Pakistan Society for the Welfare of Retarded Children. In 1987, a multi-purpose campus in J-block of Gulberg was designed by the local Architect Fuad Ali Butt and was built by Engineer Khalid Khan, a local builder.

In 1991, an outreach programme was started, with the aid from UNICEF, for the purpose of spreading awareness as well as providing services and training to the homes of mentally disabled children in economically depressed areas of Lahore.

== See also ==
- List of special education institutions in Lahore
