= Esena Foundation High School =

Location
- 24/C Gulberg II; Lahore, Punjab; Pakistan
- Coordinates: 31°31′22″N 74°20′16″E

Information
- School type: Private, preparatory
- Motto: Esena is the pride of every girl
- Opened: 1964
- Founder: Begum Aneese Majid Khan
- School board: BISE-Lahore, CIE
- Years offered: 3–4 to 18–19
- Gender: Girls
- Education system: SSC/HSC, GCE
- Language: English medium
- Schedule: Day school

Esena Foundation High School (Urdu: ایسنا فاؤنڈیشن ہائی اسکول) was a private fee-paying academic institution for girls only. It was located in Gulberg, Lahore, Punjab, Pakistan.

== History ==
It was established in 1964 by Begum Anesa Majid Khan. Esena was the very first private education institute for girls in Pakistan. Esena's director Begum Majid was the daughter of the late Imam Jafer, the chief justice of India. She died in 2013.

The school closed in 2017.
