= Shaikh Khalifa Bin Zayed Al-Nahyan Medical and Dental College =

College in Lahore, Punjab, Pakistan

Shaikh Khalifa Bin Zayed Al-Nahyan Medical & Dental College
- شیخ خلیفہ بن زائد آل نہیان طبی و دندان سازی کالج
- Motto: Saving one life saves humanity
- Type: Public sector Medical School
- Established: 2009
- Affiliations: University of Health Sciences, Lahore
- Principal: Prof. Ayesha Humayun
- Location: Lahore, Punjab, Pakistan
- Campus: 55 Acre
- Colours: Crimson and White
- Mascot: Khalifians
- Website: SKZMDC Web Portal; SZMC Web-Portal

Shaikh Khalifa Bin Zayed Al-Nahyan Medical and Dental College (Urdu: شیخ خلیفہ بن زائد آل نہیان طبی و دندان سازی کالج, abbreviated as SKZMDC) is a public medical college located in Lahore, Punjab, Pakistan.

== History ==
Shaikh Khalifa Bin Zayed Al-Nahyan Medical and Dental College was established and inaugurated in 2009 by then president of Pakistan, Asif Ali Zardari.

Shaikh Zayed Hospital is attached to the college as a teaching hospital. The college started off in 2009 and the first batch graduated at the end of 2014. The college is recognized by Pakistan Medical and Dental Council.

== Departments ==
=== Basic science departments ===
- Anatomy
- Biochemistry
- Community medicine
- Forensic medicine
- Pathology
- Pharmacology
- Physiology

=== Medicine and allied departments ===
- Cardiology
- Dermatology
- Endocrinology & Metabolism
- General medicine
- Neurology
- Pediatrics
- Preventive medicine
- Psychiatry
- Pulmonology (Chest medicine)
- Radiotherapy
- Urology

=== Surgery and allied departments ===
- Anesthesiology
- Cardiac surgery
- General surgery
- Neurosurgery
- Obstetrics and gynaecology
- Ophthalmology
- Oral and maxillofacial surgery
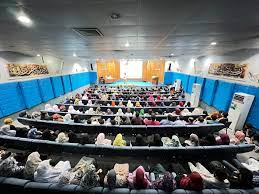
  SKZMDC Auditorium
- Orthopedics
- Otorhinolaryngology
- Pediatric surgery
- Radiology

== Admissions ==
=== Medical & Dental College ===
Admission to all public medical & dental colleges is through a centralized system at the provincial level. Students are eligible to apply for MBBS or BDS programs after Higher Secondary School Certificate (HSSC) or equivalent examination. Candidates are selected by an admission process that includes a competitive Medical & Dental College Admission Test (MDCAT) conducted annually under the instructions of Pakistan Medical Commission and more often test is conducted by University of Health Sciences. Only the students who stand higher in merit are selected by this procedure.Merit is determined by the marks obtained on the MDCAT & Higher Secondary School Certificate (HSSC) or equivalent examination. Foreign/International students can apply for admission through the Higher Education Commission of Pakistan.

=== Sheikha Fatima Institute of Nursing ===
Students can apply for 4 year BSN program after HSSC or equivalent examination. There is no central admission policy for nursing colleges. Students apply directly to college of nursing for admission consideration.

== Seat allocation ==
Seat allocation
Quota Category	No. of Seats
Punjab	38
Sindh (Rural)	09
Sindh (Urban)	06
Khyber Pakhtunkhwa	09
Balochistan	05
Gilgit Baltistan	02
FATA	02
Azad Jammu and Kashmir	02
Disabled	02
Federal Govt. Employees	09
Open Merit	06
Foreign Graduates	10

Total seats=100

== Affiliation ==
Shaikh Khalifa Bin Zayed Al-Nahyan Medical and Dental College is affiliated with

- Shaheed Zulfiqar Ali Bhutto Medical University which is the admitting University of this college
- University of Health Sciences is the degree awarding and examining university.

== Shaikh Zayed Postgraduate Medical Institute (SZPGMI) Lahore ==
Shaikh Zayed Postgraduate Medical Institute (SZPGMI) Lahore consists of:

- Shaikh Zayed Hospital (SZHL) & National Institute of Kidney Diseases (NIKD)
- Shaikh Khalifa Bin Zayed Al-Nahyan Medical and Dental College (SKZMDC)
- Federal Postgraduate Medical Institute (FPGMI)
- National Health Research Complex (NHRC)
- Sheikha Fatima Institute of Nursing and Health Sciences (SFIN & HS)

== Magazine ==
On January 27, 2016. Phoenix Magazine's first issue was launched and met with positive reviews from the Doctors and students alike, appreciating the bright outlook, the articles and interviews.

Phoenix was renewed for a second biennial edition (Phoenix 16–17) that came out in July 2017.

== Campus ==
Shaikh Zayed Medical Complex has a campus of 55 acres opposite The Punjab University lahore comprising the basic departments, administrative block, library and well-equipped modern lecture theatre complex and cafeteria.

For the purpose of extra- and co-curricular activities, kidney center playground is where cricket, football and hockey matches are played.
