= Lahore College for Women University =

Public university in Lahore, Punjab, Pakistan

- جامعہ خواتین کالج لاہور
- Motto: 'Discipline Ensures Success'
- Type: Public
- Established: 1922
- Vice-Chancellor: Prof. Dr. Uzma Qureshi
- Location: Lahore, Punjab, Pakistan
- Website: lcwu.edu.pk

The Lahore College for Women University (LCWU) (Urdu: جامعہ خواتین کالج لاہور) is a public university in Lahore, Punjab, Pakistan. Founded in 1922 with a capacity of 60 students, it now has a full-time enrollment of about 15,000 students and admits students at Intermediate, Graduate, Masters and Ph.D. levels.

== History ==
Founded as an intermediate residential college, named Sir Ganga Ram High School, in 1922, Lahore College for Women University (LCWU) was initially situated on Hall Road, Lahore, accommodating 60 students and 13 staff members. By 1950, it relocated to its current location on Jail Road, expanding its capacity to 600 students. In the same year, LCWU partnered with the University of the Punjab, offering 18 undergraduate programs, which expanded to 14 graduate programs within two years. Further academic expansion saw the introduction of postgraduate English classes in 1940, Honors classes in 1949, B.Sc. classes in 1955, and post-graduate classes in Economics and Physics in 1966. By 1979, the curriculum extended to Islamic studies, political science, and psychology.

LCWU achieved administrative and financial autonomy in 1990, marking a significant milestone. On August 13, 1999, it gained the status of a degree-awarding institution and was promoted to a Women University on September 10, 2002.

Recognizing the value of social sciences and liberal arts, LCWU maintains a strong focus on these fields. The Department of English, the oldest post-graduate department with over 70 years of existence. Other disciplines, including Urdu, Punjabi, Islamic studies, international relations, political science, fine arts, Pakistan studies, mass communication, and gender and development studies are available at graduate and postgraduate levels.

The Intermediate College of LCWU is affiliated with the Board of Intermediate and Secondary Education, Lahore, contributing significantly to female professional education in the province.

Since its recognition as a university, LCWU has sought to enhance higher education standards, engaging with national industries and forming international university partnerships. In January 2021, the university's syndicate approved the setting up of a Department of Software Engineering.

== Libraries ==
The main library of the university (Sciences, Computer Science and Arts) stocks books, magazines and publications as well as national newspapers.

Besides the main library there are seminar libraries in the post-graduate departments

=== Book bank ===
There is a book bank maintained by the Social Work Department. Deserving and needy students are provided with textbooks.

== Student activities ==
To facilitate co-curricular activities and sports, there are student societies and clubs. Presidents and secretaries of these societies are nominated by the teachers. By participating in these activities the students win prizes. The Shaukat Ara Niazi Gold Medal is awarded to students on the basis of best performance in literary pursuits.

- Botanical and Horticultural Society established by Dept. of Botany in 2013, holding interuniversity events with perspectives of Plant Sciences.
- Bazzm-e-Mushaira's develops literary and poetic ability among students by arranging poetry events and competitions. Inter-university functions and competitions are arranged
- Comp Tech Society is a platform for the student of Computer Science Department to incorporate their extracurricular activities. Students from BS-CS, MS-CS and MIT share their views and arrange events.
- The Economics Society arranges seminars, workshops, quiz competitions and essay competitions.
- The English Debating Society allows students to present their views, building confidence and oratorical skills.
- The Geography Society objective is to enhance student's capabilities, enhance their knowledge, build confidence among students and promote teamwork
- The Home Economics Society organizes workshops and competitions.
- Iqbal Society (departments of Philosophy and Persian) organize Iqbal Day programs, workshops and seminars highlighting the thought and philosophy of Iqbal.
- The Psychology Society has been revived and the members to be elected are interviewed. The society arranges events like workshops, seminars, conferences and lectures.
- The Punjabi Debating Society arranges inter-class and intercollegiate debates competitions and prepares students of LCWU to participate in debating competitions in other colleges and universities.
- The Shaukat Ara Niazi English Literary Society is named after Shaukat Ara Niazi, a faculty member of the English Department. The society arranges events, quizzes and essay writing competitions to polish students in literary activities.
- LCWU's Sports Society is under the department of Physical Education.
- The Statistics Society arranges seminars, workshops, quiz competitions and essay competitions.
- The Urdu Debating Society deals with debate declamation and speeches.
- Under the Urdu Literary Society (Halqa-e-Ehel-e-Qalam) students participate in essay writing competitions at a national level. College- and university-level essay writing competitions are arranged to promote students in literary activities.
- Founded in 2022, The "𝐌𝐨𝐝𝐞𝐥 𝐔𝐧𝐢𝐭𝐞𝐝 𝐍𝐚𝐭𝐢𝐨𝐧𝐬 𝐒𝐨𝐜𝐢𝐞𝐭𝐲 (𝐋𝐂𝐖𝐔𝐌𝐔𝐍)" regularly sends its delegations to various institutions, organises mock MUNs, and practice sessions for its delegates. The society has bagged a plethora of awards since its inception.

== Notable alumni ==
- Sheila Kaul
- Bushra Ansari
- Diana Baig
- Samina Khalid Ghurki
- Saba Hameed
- Salima Hashmi
- Farhat Hashmi
- Riffat Hassan
- Amina Majeed Malik
- Kishwar Naheed
- Maryam Nawaz
- Anusha Rahman
- Manmohini Zutshi Sahgal
- Arfa Sayeda Zehra

== See also ==
- Women's colleges
- List of educational institutions in Lahore
- List of current and historical women's universities and colleges
