= American International School System =

The American International School System
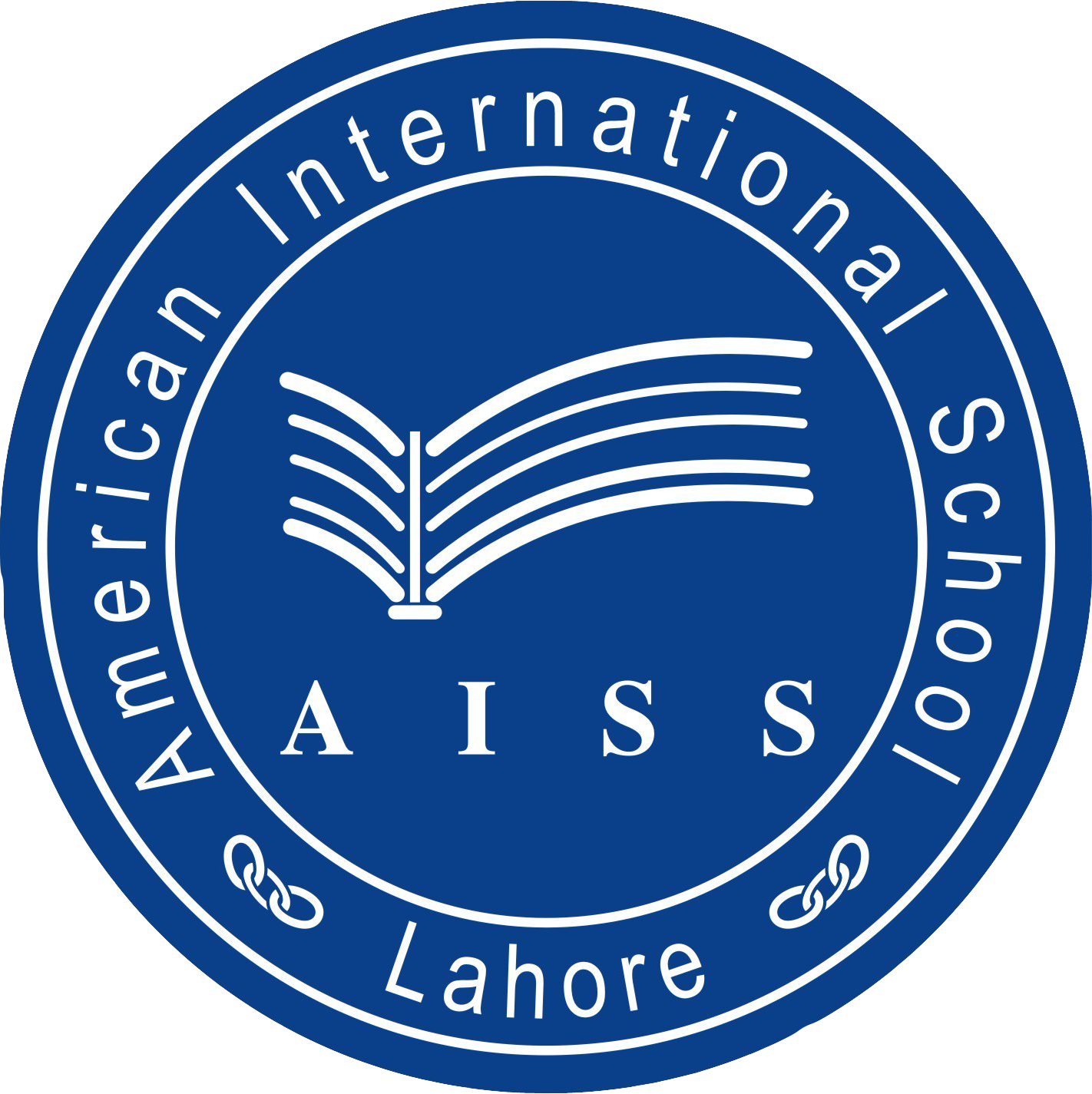
- Lahore; Pakistan

Information
- Type: Private
- Established: 2007; 19 years ago
- Dean: Maj Gen (r) Dr.Jahanzaib Khan
- Principal: Jon Moxely
- Faculty: 22
- Enrollment: ~1100
- Website: www.aisss.edu.pk

The American International School System (AISS) is a private coeducational school following an American-based curriculum. Located in Lahore, Pakistan, the school offers education from Pre-Kindergarten through Grade 8 with plans to expand through high school.

AISS's mission is to bring American educational values and learning innovations to the children of Pakistan and other sub-continent countries.

== History ==
American businessman, Dr. Munr Kazmir, who was born in Pakistan, founded the American International School System in 2006. Construction began later that year on 11.5 acres of land in Hurbanspura, purchased from the Government of Punjab.

The school was launched in 2007 with just seven pre-school and kindergarten students. Today, there are one hundred and twenty-five students from pre-school through eighth grade. Enrollment is expected to grow to 1,200 students by 2016.

== Curriculum and teaching ==
The school's curriculum is based entirely on the U.S. curriculum model and taught in English, however Urdu and Islamiat classes are provided due to the Ministry of Education's requirement. The school is in the process of being accredited by Middle States Association of Colleges and Schools.

AISS brings certified teachers from the U.S. who follow American standards of education. The school also recruits teachers from the U.S. as visiting instructors. These guest teachers observe classroom instruction and provide feedback on the curriculum and teaching practices.

The George Washington University (GWU), School of Human Development and Education has partnered with AISS to make available a comprehensive professional development program for faculty, and has created a sophisticated curriculum ranging from literacy, conflict resolution, and peace-studies. Five courses upgrade faculty content knowledge and instructional expertise, develop capacity in the use of interactive technology, and establish professional collaborations with U.S. faculty. GWU Professor Judy Findlay leads the program.

== Campus and facilities ==
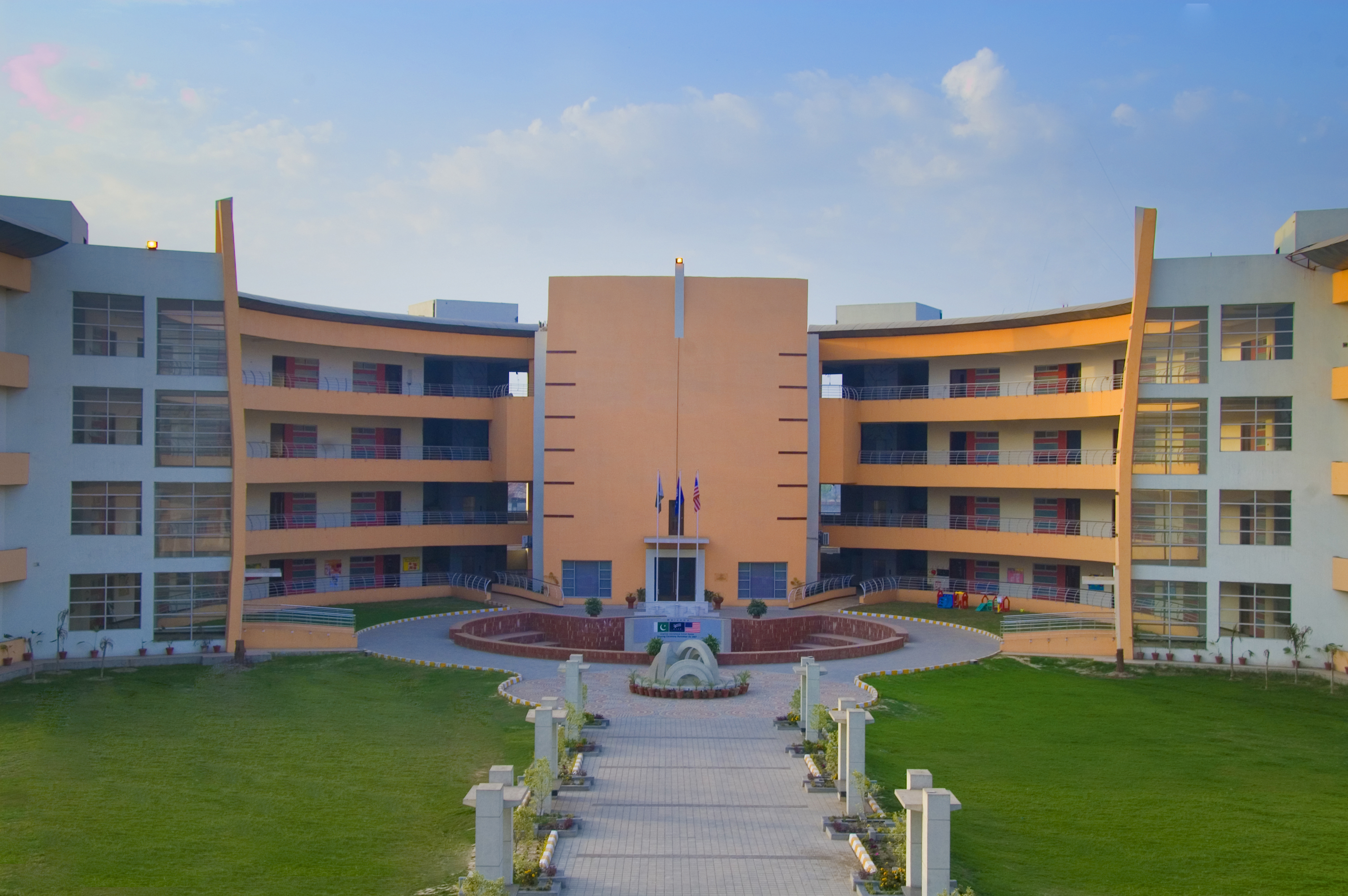
The school building was designed by Mr. Zeeshan of Lahore and resembles a crescent, depicting Pakistan's Islamic heritage.

With a $10.2 million investment including a $2.5 loan from the Overseas Private Investment Corporation (OPIC), AISS built one of the most modern and state-of-the-art campuses in Pakistan. The campus contains an amphitheater, swimming pool, cafeteria, a hi-tech auditorium, libraries, a main computer lab and computers in all classrooms. AISS is the first Pakistani educational institution to be handicap accessible.

In addition to classroom education, the facilities are used for other advanced educational and civic activities sponsored by the school, which includes basic and advanced teacher training and mentoring programs for children and adults. Civic activities include community outreach and the use of the facility as a community center.

== Financial support and foundation ==
With over 87% of its students attending on scholarship, the school relies on the American International School System Foundation financially. The AISS Foundation is a U.S. non-profit 501(c)(3) that supports student scholarships and financial assistance to support AISS for its academic programs and facilities.

The Foundation also creates programs and services that foster a favorable image of the United States, increase understanding between the people of the United States and the Muslim world, and train independent thinkers to stand up against violence and extremism.

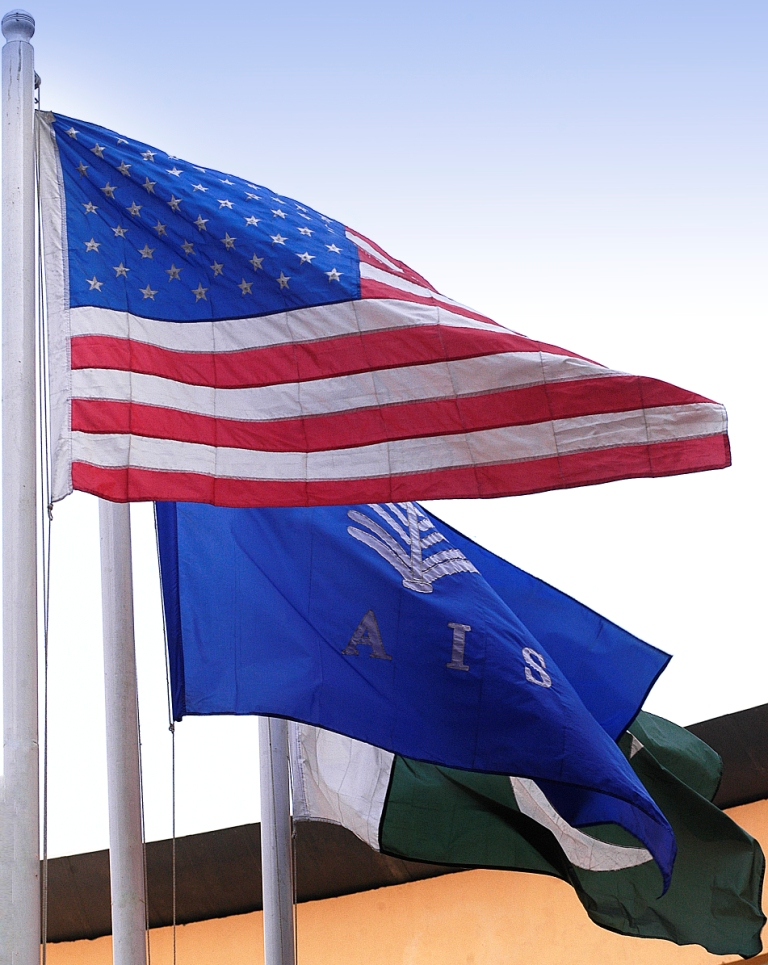
The American, AISS and Pakistan flags greet visitors at the school.

== Notable support and visitors ==
On August 25, 2010, Senators Joe Lieberman, John McCain, Ben Cardin and Kirsten Gillibrand co-signed a letter to Mian Muhammad Shahbaz Sharif, the Chief Minister of Punjab, in support of the school. In the letter they stated, "We believe that this school represents an extremely important educational initiative and a critical bond of friendship between the United States and Pakistan."

On April 28, 2009, Senators Joe Lieberman, and Congressmembers Donald Payne, Steve Rothman, Gary Ackerman, Carolyn Maloney, Scott Garrett, and Joseph Crowley co-signed a letter to Yousaf Raza Gilani, the Prime Minister of Pakistan, thanking him for his support of AISS.

The school has also been visited by a number of ranking politicians including: Chaudhry Pervaiz Elahi, the former Chief Minister of Punjab; Mujtaba Shujaur Rehman, Education Minister of Punjab, and; American Consulates Brian Hunt and Carmela Conroy.
