= List of special education institutions in Pakistan =

This is a list of institutes of special education in Pakistan.

== Institutes for Blind (Visually Impaired Children), Punjab ==
Sr.No	Name of Institute and Address
1	Govt. Institute for Visually Impaired Sheranwala Gate, Lahore
2	Govt. Sunrise Institute for Visually Impaired Ravi Road, Lahore.
3	Govt. Institute for Visually Impaired Girls,128- Khyber Block Allama Iqbal Town, Lahore
4	Govt. High School of Special Education for Blind, Multan. Shah Rukn-E-Alam Colony, Multan.
5	Govt High School of Special, Education for V.I D.G. Khan. Z-Block.
6	Govt. High School of Special Education for Blind Sahiwal. Street #02, Y-Block, Tariq Bin Zaid Road
7	Govt. High School of Special Education for Blind Faisalabad. W-Block Medina Town, Faisalabad.
8	Govt. High School of Special Education for VIC, Sargodha. Z-Block, Iqbal Colony, Sargodha
9	Govt. Primary School for Visual Impaired Girls, Sargodha. (Newly Established)
10	Govt. Secondary School of Special Education for Blind, Bahawalpur. Model Town A-Block, Bahawalpur
11	Govt. Institute for Blind, Gujranwala W-Block, Peoples Colony.
12	Govt. School for the Blind Girls, Rawalpindi Near Furniture Market, Shahmasabad.
13	Govt. Qandeel Secondary School for the Blind, Rawalpindi Kohati Bazar.
14	Govt. Razia Sultan Institute for the Blind, Attock. People Colony.
15	Govt. School for the Blind, Chakwal Tatral Road.
16	Govt. Rohtas Special Education Center For VIC Monan, Jhelum (Devolved)

== Karachi ==
- Blind Resource Foundation Pakistan (http://www.brfpakistan.org/)
- The Effort Rehabilitation and Vocational Centre for Special Children Garden West karachi
- Ida Rieu School
- IBP - School of Special Education
- Nai Subah - Institute for Persons with visual impairment
- (C-ARTS) - Center for Autism Rehabilitation and Training, Sindh (C-ARTS)

== Faisalabad ==
- Institute for Hearing Impaired/Intellectually Challenged and Physically Challenged Kids. Tanzeem al-Lissan - Eid Bagh, Dhobi Ghat, Faisalabad (http://al-lissan.org) 041-2601487

== Lahore ==
List of Schools for Special Children in Lahore

Sr.No.	Type Of Institute	Name of Institute
1	Center	Govt. Special Education Center, Ravi Town, Ali Park, Fort Road Lahore.
2	Center	Govt. Special Education Center, Shalimar Town, H/No.982/A, block B-1, Gujjarpura Scheme Lahore.
3	Center	Govt. Special Education Center, Aziz Bhatti Town, St. No. 2, Afzal Park, Harbanspura, Lahore.
4	Center	Govt. Special Education Center, Haji Park G.T. Road Wagha Town, Lahore
5	Center	Govt. Special Education Center, Nishtar Town, 389 B-III, Johar Town, Lahore
6	Blind (Visually Impaired)	Govt. Institute for Visually Impaired Sheranwala Gate, Lahore
7	Blind (Visually Impaired)	Govt. Sunrise Institute for Visually Impaired Ravi road, Lahore.
8	Blind (Visually Impaired)	Govt. Institute for Visually Impaired Girls,128- Khyber Block Allama Iqbal Town, Lahore
9	Mentally Challenged	Govt. Shadab Training Institute for M.CC, 128-Khyber Block, Allama Iqbal Town Lahore.
10	Deaf (Hearing Impaired)	Govt. High School of Special Education for Hearing Impaired (Girls), Chuburgi, Lahore
11	Deaf (Hearing Impaired)	Govt. High School of Special Education for Hearing Impaired (Boys), 40-T Gulberg-II, Lahore
12	Deaf (Hearing Impaired)	Govt. Central High School for the Deaf, 40-T, Gulberg-II, Lahore
13	Physically Disabled	Govt. School of Physically Disabled Children, Quarter No.08, Chuburji, Lahore
14	Slow Learners	Govt. Institute for Slow Learner, House No. 5, St. No. 17, Gulzeb Colony, Samanabad, Lahore
15	Slow Learners	Govt. Institute for the Slow Learners, Narowal. Near AL Rehman Garden Phase II, New Lahore Road
16	Degree College	Govt. Degree College for Special Education 45 B-II, Johar Town, Lahore
17	Training Colleges	Govt. In-service Training college for the Teachers of Disabled Children, 31- Sher Shah Block, New Garden Town, Lahore
18	Training Colleges	Govt. Training college for the Teachers of Blind, 31- Sher Shah Block, New Garden Town, Lahore
19	Training Colleges	Govt. Training college for the Teachers of Deaf, 40-T Gulberg-II, Lahore

Institution	Address
Amin Maktab Centre for Special Education and Training	54 A, Block J, Gulberg III
Dar-ul-Mussarat, Lahore	17 Waris Road
Dar-ul-Mussarat 2	Near St. Paul's Church, Nawaz Sharif Colony, Ferozepur Road
Rising Sun Institute	544/2 XX sector, Defence Housing Authority Lahore
Pakistan Society for the Rehabilitation of the Disabled Lahore (PSRD) High School for Physically Disabled	111, Ferozepur Road, Near Shahjamal, Lahore
Sada-e-Umeed	Khanewal
Thevenet Centre for Special Education	Convent of Jesus and Mary

== See also ==
- Special education department (Punjab, Pakistan)
- Education in Pakistan
