= Superior University Lahore =

University in Lahore, Pakistan

The Superior University, Lahore
- Lahore, Punjab; Pakistan

Information
- Type: Private university
- Established: 5 January 2000
- Faculty: 13
- Colours: Purple and Blue
- Affiliations: Higher Education Commission (Pakistan); Pakistan Engineering Council; Pharmacy Council of Pakistan; Pakistan Bar Council; Pakistan Council for Architects and Town Planners
- Website: superior.edu.pk

The Superior University is a private university in Lahore, Punjab, Pakistan.

== Constituent colleges ==
- Azra Naheed Medical College

== Charter and recognition ==
Superior University is chartered by the Government of Punjab, Pakistan and recognized by the Higher Education Commission (Pakistan) (HEC) and Pakistan Bar Council.

== Journal ==
Superior is publishing a journal to promote research activities. International Journal of Management Research & Emerging Sciences is a research journal with an ISSN 2223-5604 EISSN 2313-7738 which is published once in a year. Journal is published by Azra Naheed Center Research & Development (ANCRD).

== Programs ==
- Undergraduate programs
  - B.Sc Hons. Biotechnology
  - B.Sc Hons. Biotechnology and Microbiology
  - B.Sc Hons. Biotechnology and Biochemistry
  - B.Sc Hons. Biotechnology and Molecular Biology
  - BS Avionics Engineering
  - BS Mass Communication
  - BS Interior Design Management
  - BS Product Design Management
  - BBA (Hons.)
  - BS Aviation Management
  - BS Aviation Engineering Technology
  - BS Computer Science
  - BS Robotics
  - BS Software Engineering
  - BS Gaming and Multimedia
  - B.Sc Computer Engineering
  - BS Telecommunications
  - B.Sc Electrical Engineering
  - BS Electrical Systems
  - B.Arch Bachelor of Architecture
  - BS Electrical Engineering Technology
  - BS Electronics Engineering Technology
  - BS Mechanical Engineering Technology
  - BS Civil Engineering Technology
  - BS HVAC Engineering Technology
  - BS Industrial Management
  - B.Com. (Hons.)
  - Bachelor of Economics and Law
  - Association of Chartered Certified Accountants (ACCA) (UK)
  - Certified Accounting Technician (CAT) (UK)
  - BS (Hons.) Accounting and Finance
  - Certified Management Accountant (CMA)
  - Azra Naheed Medical College
    - MBBS (Degree is awarded by University of Health Sciences Lahore)
    - Clinical Psychology (CP)
    - Doctor of Pharmacy (Pharm.D)
- Post graduate programs
  - MBA (Professional)
  - MBA (Executive)
  - MBA (2 years)
  - MBA Entrepreneurship Development
  - MBA Pharmaceutical Management
  - Masters in Educational Leadership
  - MS Arts & Design
  - Masters in Public Administration
  - Masters in Mass Communication
  - M.Sc Human Resource Management (HRM)
  - MIT Master of Information Technology
  - M.Sc Quality Management
  - M.Sc Industrial Management
  - M.Sc Economics
  - Master's degree in Business Economics
  - M.Com
  - LL.B (Degree is awarded by University of the Punjab)
- Research programs
  - Ph.D Business Management
  - Ph.D in Law
  - Ph.D Computer Science
  - MS Business Administration
  - MS/MPhil Economics
  - MS/MPhil Commerce
  - MS Human Resource Management (HRM)
  - LL.M
  - MS Computer Sciences
  - MS Quality Management
  - MS Industrial Management
