= University of Lahore =

Private university in Lahore, Pakistan

The University of Lahore
- Type: Private
- Established: 1999; 27 years ago
- Founder: M A Raoof
- Affiliations: HEC, PEC, PMDC, PCP, PNC, PBC
- Chairman: Awais Raoof
- Rector: Muhammad Ashraf
- Faculty: 150
- Students: 25000
- Location: Lahore, Punjab, Pakistan
- Campus: Lahore and Sargodha
- Colours: Lime green & Green
- Website: uol.edu.pk

The University of Lahore (Urdu: جامعہ لاہور), abbreviated as UOL, is a private university located in Lahore, Punjab, Pakistan.

The University of Lahore was founded at the collegiate level in 2013, under the IBADAT Educational Trust and was granted full degree awarding status in 2002. It is one of the largest private universities in Pakistan. Degrees are awarded in medicine, engineering, arts and social sciences. All programs are recognized by the Higher Education Commission (HEC) and government regulatory bodies in Pakistan. It is accredited by the Pakistan Engineering Council (PEC), Pakistan Bar Council, Pakistan Medical and Dental Council (PMDC), Pakistan Nursing Council and the Pharmacy Council of Pakistan.

== Introduction ==
The University of Lahore (UOL) has 2 campuses in Lahore, 2 campuses in Islamabad and one each in Sargodha, Pakpattan and Gujrat. All programs are recognized by the Higher Education Commission (HEC), the government regulatory body in Pakistan. The Lahore campus not only attracts locals in large number, but foreigners as well.

The University also has courses accredited by the Pakistan Engineering Council (PEC), Pharmacy Council of Pakistan, Pakistan Bar Council and the Pakistan Medical and Dental Council (PMDC).

The University has also achieved the highest W4 category ranking with the Higher Education Commission (HEC) of Pakistan. The University of Lahore has 7 campuses, 11 academic faculties, 35 academic departments, 3 technology parks, 2 research centres, an alumni network of 23000^{+}, and 150^{+} degree programs over 3,000^{+} courses. The total student body from all campuses is ~36,000^{+} .

== Faculties and departments ==
=== Faculty of Allied Health Sciences ===
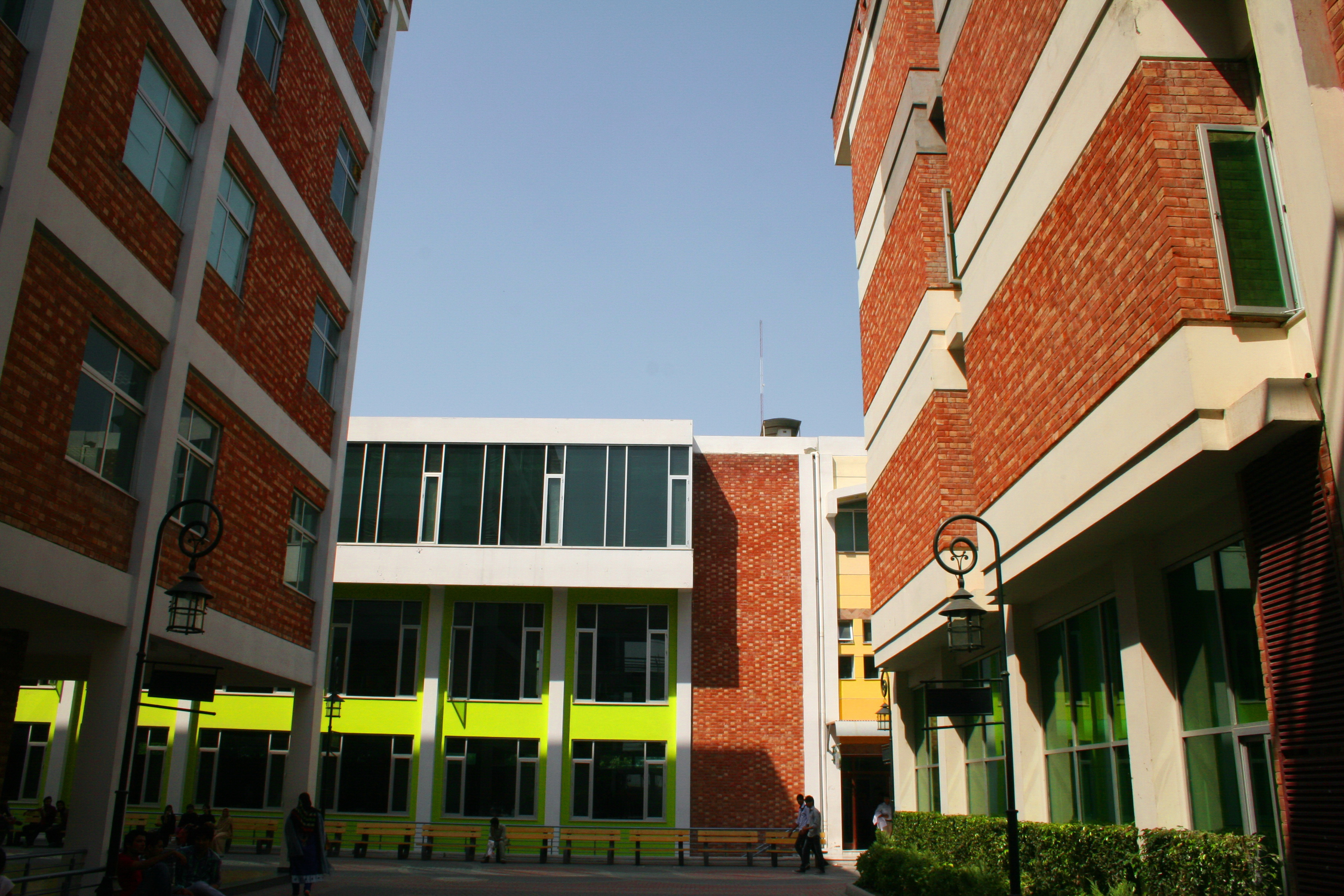
The University Of Lahore

- Cardiac Perfusion Technology
- BS of Optometry
- Dept. of Health Professional Technologies(HFT)
- Dept. of Sports Sciences
- Lahore School of Nursing(Physiotherapy)
- Radiological Sciences & Medical Imaging Technology
- Dept. of Physiotherapy
- University Institute of Public Health
- Dept. of Diet & Nutritional Sciences
- Dept. of Clinical Lab Technology(CLT)

=== Faculty of Arts and Architecture ===
- School of Architecture
- School of Creative Arts

=== Faculty of Engineering and Technology ===
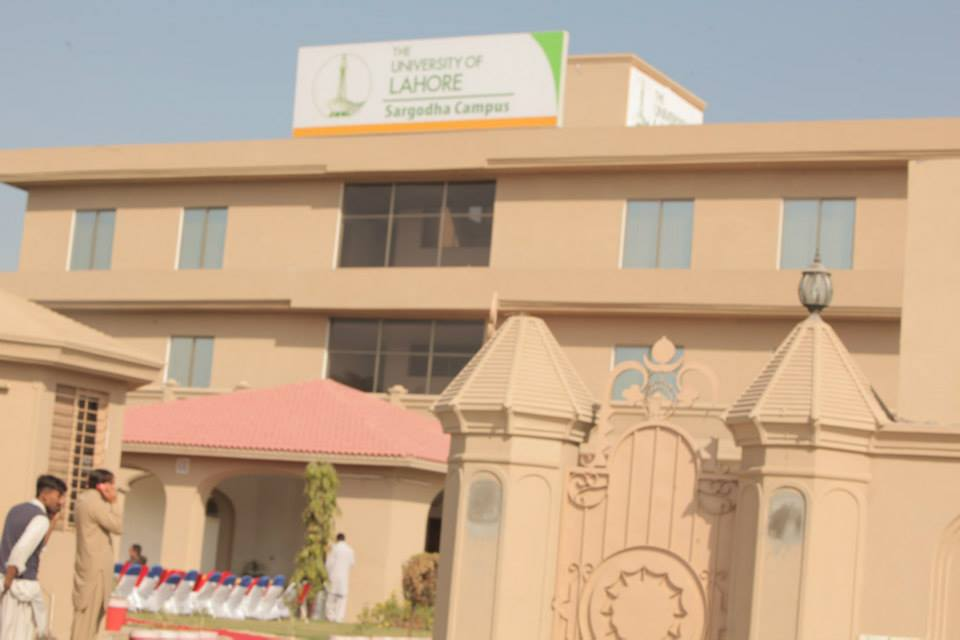
UOL Sargodha Campus

- Dept. of Computer Engineering
- Dept. of Electrical Engineering
- Dept. of Mechanical Engineering
- Dept. of Electronics & Electrical Systems
- Dept. of Technology (Electrical, Mechanical, Civil)

=== Faculty of Information and Technology ===
- Dept. of Computer Science
- Dept. of Software Eng

=== Faculty of Languages and Literature ===
- Dept. of English Language & Literature

=== Faculty of Medicine and Dentistry ===
- University College of Medicine
- University College of Dentistry
- University College of Physician
- University College of veterinary
- University College of Pharmacy

=== Faculty of Management Sciences ===
- Lahore School of Accounting & Finance
- Lahore Business School (LBS)
- Lahore School of Aviation (LSA)
- Lahore School of Management & commerce

=== Faculty of Pharmacy ===
- Department of Pharmacy

=== Faculty of Sciences ===
- Institute Of Molecular Biology & Bio-Technology
- Dept. of Physics
- Dept. of Chemistry
- Dept. of Environmental Sciences
- Dept. of Mathematics & Statistics

=== Faculty of Social Sciences ===
- Dept. of Education
- Dept. of Economics
- Dept. of Islamic Studies
- School of Integrated Social Sciences
- School of Accounting and Finance
- School of Grammar

=== Academy of International Certifications ===
- SGS Academy
- E-Commerce Level 04

== Campuses ==
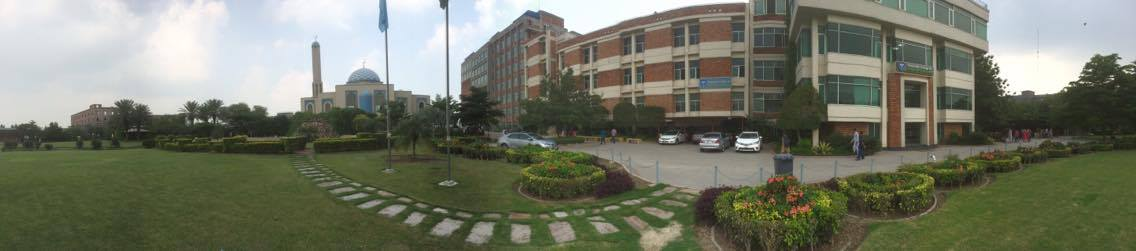
Northern garden of the University of Lahore, Defence road campus. From left to right: CS & IT Department, UOL Mosque, Engineering Block-1, Lahore School of Dentistry and Nursing

The University of Lahore has seven campuses across Pakistan:

- The University of Lahore (Main Campus)
- The University of Lahore (Defence Road Campus)
- The University of Lahore (City Campus)
- The University of Lahore (Islamabad Campus)
- The University of Lahore (Sargodha Campus)
- The University of Lahore (Pakpattan Campus)
- The University of Lahore (Gujrat Campus)
- The University of Lahore (Uganda Campus)

== Centers ==
The University has six research centers:

- Center For Research In Molecular Medicine (CRIMM)
- Radiology Research Section (RRS)
- Agri-Bio Technology Park
- Diagnostic Laboratory and Research Centre
- Postgraduate Computing Research Lab
- Lahore Incubation Center (LIC)

== UOL Rankings ==
University rankings

Global – Overall
- ARWU World: 901–1000 (2023)
- QS World: 951-1000 (2026)
- THE World: 801–1000 (2024)
- USNWR Global: =1344 (2023)

- QS World University Rankings (#1001-1200)
- Asia University Rankings (#301-350)
- Times Higher Education (#801)
- BRICS & Emerging Economies University Rankings (#251)
- University Web Rankings (#31)
- UI Green Metric Ranking (#226)
- UOL Ranking among Pakistani Universities (#70)
