= Pharmacy Council of Pakistan =

Regulatory body of pharmacists and pharmacies in Pakistan

Pharmacy Council of Pakistan کونسل دواسازی پاکستان
- Abbreviation: PCP
- Established: 1967
- Location: Islamabad, Pakistan
- Region served: Pakistan
- President: Dr Baseer Achakzai
- Parent organization: Ministry of National Health Services Regulation and Coordination
- Affiliations: Higher Education Commission of Pakistan
- Website: www.pcpisb.gov.pk

The Pharmacy Council of Pakistan (کونسل دواسازی پاکستان; acronym PCP) is a professional body for accreditation of pharmacy education and regulation of pharmacy profession in Pakistan.

It was established under Pharmacy Act, 1967 to protect, promote and maintain the health, safety and wellbeing of patients and the public. In addition, this council accredits pharmacy schools and colleges in Pakistan to ensure that the required standard of studies is met before it grants its approval.

The council is also responsible for registration of pharmacists and pharmacy technicians. In October 2016, when new members of this council took oath, it was decided to bring changes to pharmaceutical education to bring it up to international standards.

Pharmacy Council of Pakistan is a regulatory authority for pharmacies and pharmacists in Pakistan. It is one of the accredited councils of Higher Education Commission of Pakistan.

This council operates under the Ministry of National Health Services Regulation and Coordination, Islamabad, Pakistan.

== See also ==
- List of pharmacy schools in Pakistan
