= List of Government College University, Lahore alumni =

Alumni of the Government College University, Lahore (GCU), including alumni of its predecessor Government College, Lahore, are called Ravians. Following is the list of notable Ravians.

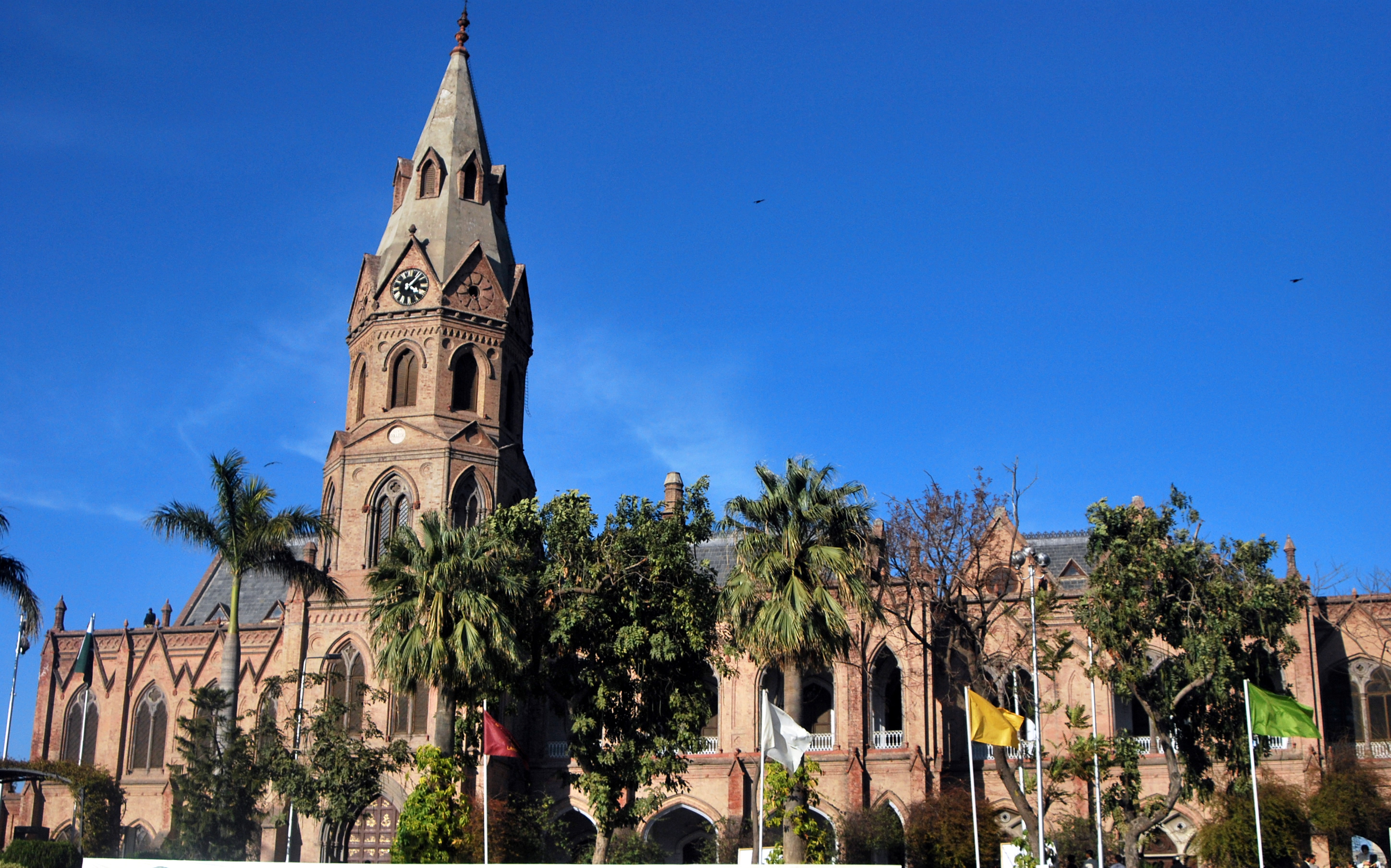
Government College University

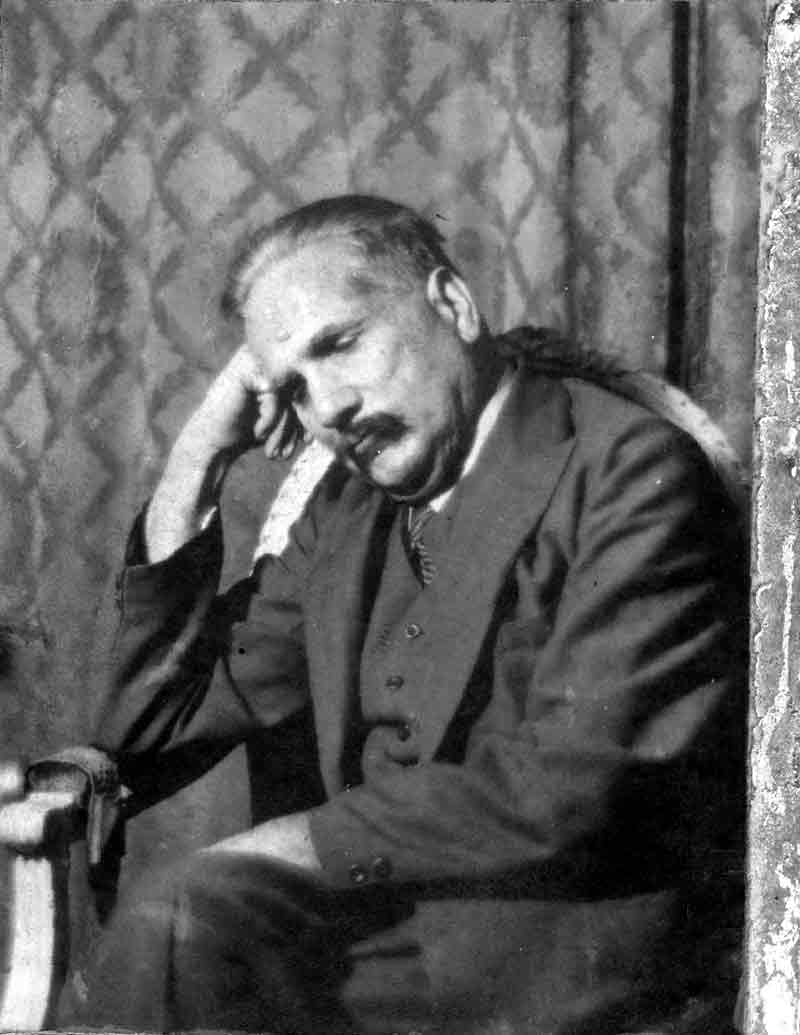
Sir Muhammad Iqbal - national poet of Pakistan and important figure in Urdu literature

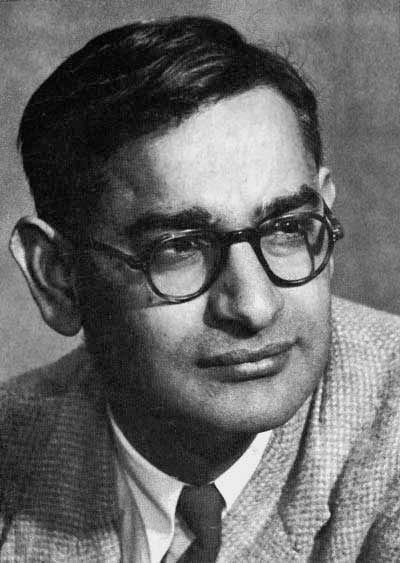
Har Gobind Khorana - won the 1968 Nobel Prize in Medicine

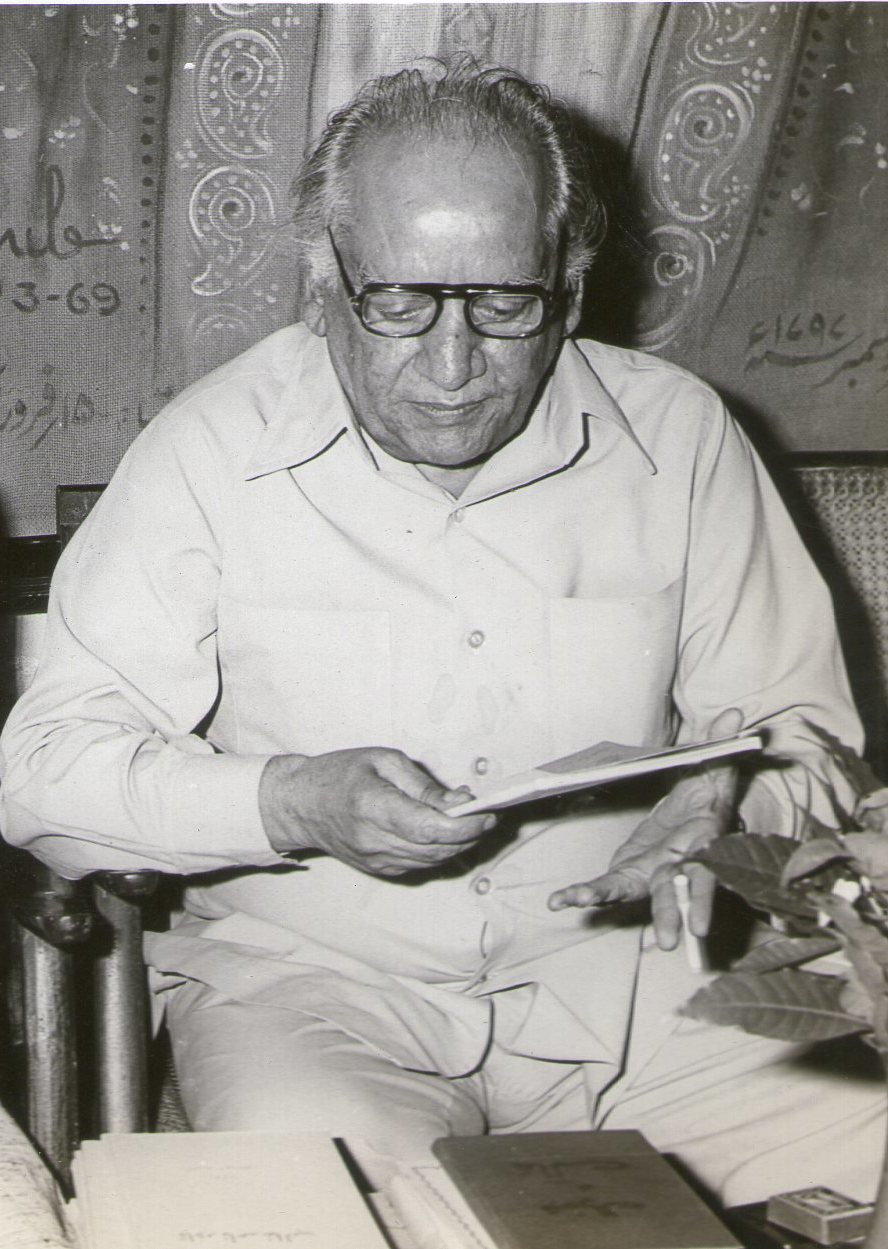
Faiz Ahmad Faiz - was one of Pakistan's leading Marxist's who won the Lenin Peace Prize

== Nobel Laureates ==
- Dr. Har Gobind Khorana - Recipient of Nobel Prize in Medicine;
- Dr. Abdus Salam - Nobel Laureate in theoretical physics; astrophysicist

== Scholars ==
- Muhammad Iqbal – Poet, philosopher, politician, lawyer, architect of the idea of Pakistan
- Mirza Athar Baig – Novelist, playwright and philosopher
- Muhammad Ajmal – Founder of psychology in Pakistan, former Principal of Government College and Vice Chancellor of the University of the Punjab
- Hassan Abbas – Pakistani-American scholar of South Asian and Middle Eastern studies
- Javed Ashraf – Economist, academician and Vice Chancellor of Quaid-e-Azam University
- Tariq Jameel – Islamic scholar and preacher
- Javed Ahmad Ghamidi – Islamic modernist scholar
- Malik Ram – Urdu, Arabic, and Persian scholar and writer
- Ismat Beg – Mathematician and academician. Known for his work in fixed point theory and multicriteria decision-making problems.
- Arfa Sayeda Zehra – Pakistani educationist and Urdu language expert
- Asghar Zaidi – Former Vice Chancellor of Government College University (GCU)
- Khalid Manzoor Butt – Pakistani Political Science Scholar.
- Sarvadaman Chowla – Indian-American mathematician
- Mohan Singh Diwana - Historian of Punjabi literature and poet
- Farkhanda Manzoor - Former Vice-Chancellor of Lahore College for Women University

== Writers ==
- Vasay Chaudhry – Film, drama writer, actor
- Mustansar Hussain Tarar – Writer, poet, storyteller, and intellectual.
- Ashfaq Ahmed – Urdu writer, playwright, broadcaster and intellectual
- Mirza Athar Baig – novelist, playwright, philosopher, and short story writer
- Patras Bokhari – Urdu writer; first Permanent Representative of Pakistan to the United Nations (1951–54); former Under-Secretary General of United
- Bano Qudsia – novelist
- Qudrat Ullah Shahab – Urdu writer and civil servant
- Wasif Ali Wasif – Poet and intellectual
- Khushwant Singh – Indian novelist and barrister

== Politicians ==
- Aitzaz Ahsan – Barrister, former federal minister, former president of Supreme Court Bar Association of Pakistan
- Mian Abdul Bari – 2nd Leader of the Opposition in the Provincial Assembly of the Punjab and former president of the Punjab Awami League and Punjab Muslim League.
- Aseff Ahmad Daula – Former Minister of Foreign Affairs and current Deputy Chairman Planning Commission
- Yusuf Raza Gilani – Former Prime Minister of Pakistan and speaker
- Dr. Ghulam Hussain – former Federal Minister for Railways and Secretary-General of Pakistan People's Party
- Zafarullah Khan Jamali – Former Prime Minister of Pakistan
- Khurshid Mahmud Kasuri – former Minister of Foreign Affairs
- Muhammad Zafarullah Khan – first Foreign Minister of Pakistan; former President of United Nations General Assembly; former President of International Court of Justice
- Naseer Ahmad Malhi - A close aide of Muhammad Ali Jinnah and one of Pakistan's founding fathers. Former Minister of Education, Law & Parliamentary Affairs
- Moeenuddin Ahmad Qureshi – Former interim Prime Minister of Pakistan
- Hanif Ramay – intellectual, journalist; former Governor and Chief Minister of Punjab
- Syed Abid Hussain Shah – landlord, former central and provincial minister of Pakistan
- Nawaz Sharif – Former three-time Prime Minister of Pakistan
- Shehbaz Sharif - Prime Minister, current president of Pakistan Muslim league
- Swaran Singh – the longest-serving Indian federal minister

== Government officials ==
- Malik Zahoor Ahmad – diplomat, Middle East/South Asia expert, political analyst
- Mirza Muzaffar Ahmad – former Secretary of Commerce and Finance; Deputy Director Planning Commission of Pakistan; former Finance Minister Pakistan
- Musa Javed Chohan – diplomat, former ambassador to France, Malaysia
- Javid Husain - diplomat, former ambassador of Pakistan to Iran, South Korea, and the Netherlands
- Abdus Salim Khan - senior Pakistani diplomat and former ambassador of Pakistan to Ceylon (now Sri Lanka), Japan and Deputy High Commissioner to the United Kingdom.
- Kershasp Tehmurasp Satarawala - diplomat, former Indian Ambassador to Mexico, Guatemala, and El Salvador
- S M Zafar – Lawyer, Senator, and former Law Minister

== Armed Forces officers ==
- Lieutenant General Hamid Gul – Former Director-General of Inter-Services Intelligence, HI(M), SI(M), SBt
- General Shamim Alam Khan - Former Chairman Joint Chiefs of Staff Committee, NI(M), HI(M), SJ, SBt, LoM
- General Raheel Sharif - Commander of Islamic Military Counter Terrorism Coalition and Former Chief of the Army Staff (Pakistan), NI(M), HI(M)
- Air Chief Marshal Mushaf Ali Mir - Chief of the Air Staff (Pakistan), NI(M), HI(M), SI(M), SBt
- Major Shabbir Sharif - Recipient of Pakistan's highest military award, Nishan-e-Haider, which he was posthumously awarded for his actions of valor during the Indo-Pakistani War of 1971. NH, SJ, Sword of Honour
- Indian Lieutenant General Harbaksh Singh – Former GOC-in-C of Western Command (India) (1965-1969)
- Indian Air Chief Marshal Om Prakash Mehra – 8th Chief of the Air Staff (India) (1973-1976)

== Nuclear scientists ==
- Dr. Ishfaq Ahmad - nuclear physicist; chairman of PAEC, 1991-2001
- Dr. Mujaddid Ahmad Ijaz - researcher in theoretical physics with PAEC.
- Munir Ahmad Khan - Chairman of PAEC, 1972–1991; IAEA staff member, 1958–72; Chairman of IAEA Board of Governors, 1986–87
- Dr. Samar Mubarakmand - experimental nuclear physicist and missile engineer

== Actors ==
- Dev Anand
- Talha Chahour
- Ahsan Khan
- Sarmad Khoosat
- Usman Peerzada
- Balraj Sahni

== Poets ==
- Dr.Muhammad Iqbal – Pakistan's national poet
- Noon Meem Rashid - poet
- Faiz Ahmed Faiz - one of Pakistan's leading Marxist's who won the Lenin Peace Prize

== Journalists ==
- Aftab Iqbal-Investigative Journalist, Infotainment Comedy Anchor
- Amir Mir - investigative journalist
- Hamid Mir – journalist, political analyst and TV anchor
- Ahmed Rashid – UK-based journalist, analyst and writer
- Mansoor Ali Khan - Anchorperson To the Point
- Mubashir Lucman - Film Director turned journalist
- Najam Sethi - News Analyst
- Iqrar Ul Hassan - Hosts Sar e Aam at ARY NEWS

== Judiciary & lawyers ==
- Justice Muhammad Javed Buttar - Former Justice, Supreme Court of Pakistan
- Justice Javed Iqbal – Former Chief Justice of the Lahore High Court; Judge of Supreme Court; son of Dr. Sir Muhammad Iqbal
- Justice M. R. Kayani – Former Chief Justice of Lahore High Court
- Justice Asif Saeed Khosa, judge Supreme Court of Pakistan
- Makhdoom Ali Khan - Barrister, Former Attorney General of Pakistan
- Justice Nasim Hasan Shah - Former Chief Justice, Supreme Court of Pakistan
- Justice Mian Saqib Nisar - Former Chief Justice, Supreme Court of Pakistan
- Justice Asif Saeed Khan Khosa - Former Chief Justice, Supreme Court of Pakistan.
- Justice Yahya Afridi- Chief Justice, Supreme Court of Pakistan.
- Justice Ram Lall, Chief Justice of Punjab and Haryana High Court

== Musicians ==
- Shafqat Amanat Ali Khan – singer
- Mustafa Zahid - pop singer and vocalist of the band Roxen
- Hadiqa Kiani - singer
- Ali Zafar - pop singer
- Waris Baig – singer

== Athletes ==
- Ibrar Hussain Rizvi – footballer
- Rameez Raja - cricketer, who represented Pakistan in 1990s, commentator in international cricket matches

== People from film industry ==
- Chetan Anand – producer and director from India; elder brother of Dev and Vijay Anand

== Businessmen / Entrepreneurs ==
- Prakash Tandon – Indian businessman
