= Khalid Manzoor Butt =

Pakistani educationist and researcher

- Born: Lahore, Pakistan
- Occupations: Professor and researcher
- Title: Chairperson Political Science Department Government College University Lahore

Academic background
- Education: M.A. Pol.Sc. MPhil Pol.Sc. Ph.D. Pol.Sc.
- Alma mater: University of the Punjab; Government College University Lahore

Academic work
- Discipline: Political science

Khalid Manzoor Butt (Urdu خالد منظور بٹ) is a Lahore-based professor and researcher of political science and Dean of Faculty of Humanities and Social Sciences (FHSS) in University of Central Punjab (UCP), Lahore and former Head, Department of Political Science Government College University Lahore (GCU). He was born, grew up and studied in Lahore.

He received a DAAD fellowship at ZEF, University of Bonn (ZEF), Germany in 2013 and the Ministry of Education's fellowship in China University of Geosciences, Wuhan in 2008 and 2019. Butt is a Dean, Faculty of Arts & Social Sciences., Director at Centre of Excellence China Study, Chief Editor of The Journal of Political Science, Government College University He is a member Board of Studies of Political Science.

== Biography ==
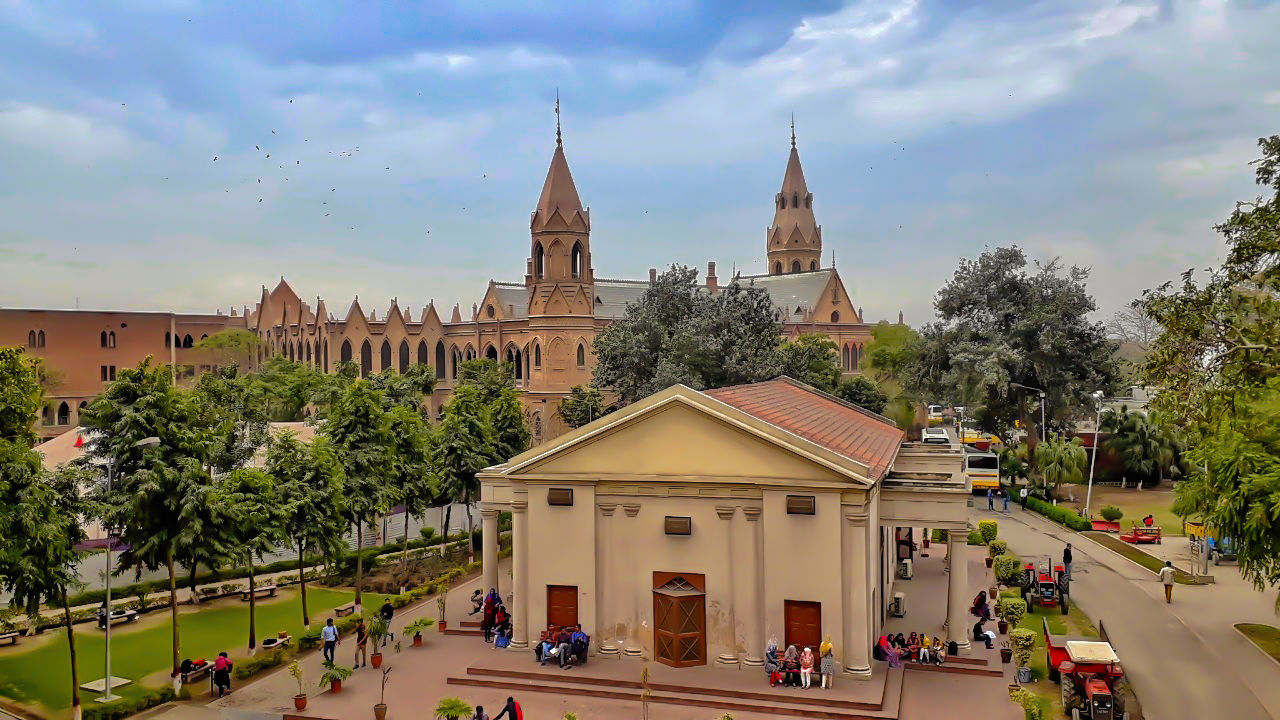
GCU Old Building of Languages

Butt was born in Lahore and received schooling from Govt. Central Model School in the 1970s. He graduated from Government College University Lahore in the 1980s and then did his master's degree in political science in 1987 with distinction (silver medal) from University of the Punjab. Butt was awarded Roll of Honour in co-curricular & College Color in sports. He earned his MPhil in 2003, and Ph.D. in 2010 from Government College University Lahore.

== Author ==
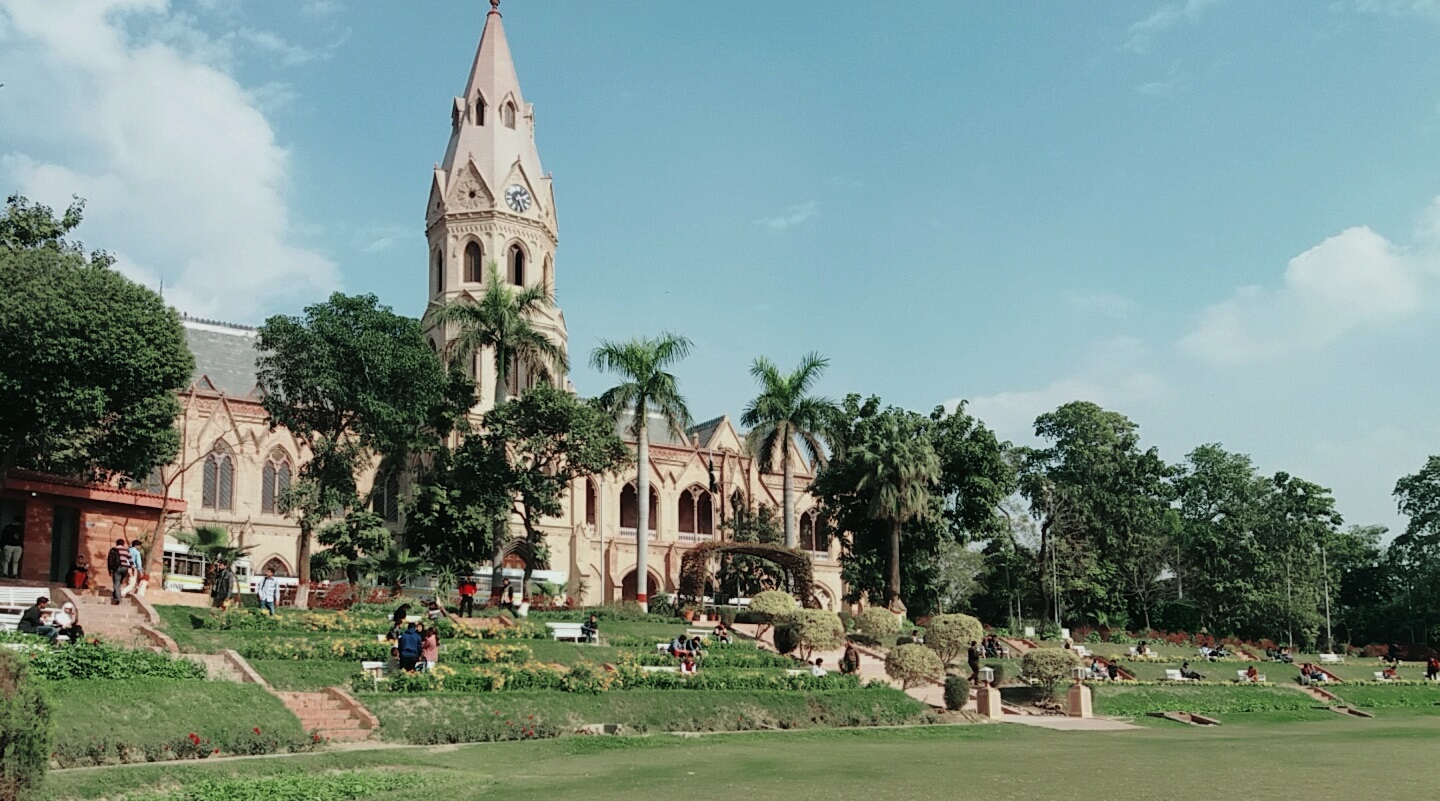
As seen from Oval Ground

Apart from dozens of research articles published in various journals and magazines, he is author of a book, Child Labor in Human Rights Perspective in 2013 which was published by Sang-e-Meel Publications.

== Honorary secretary Alumni Association ==
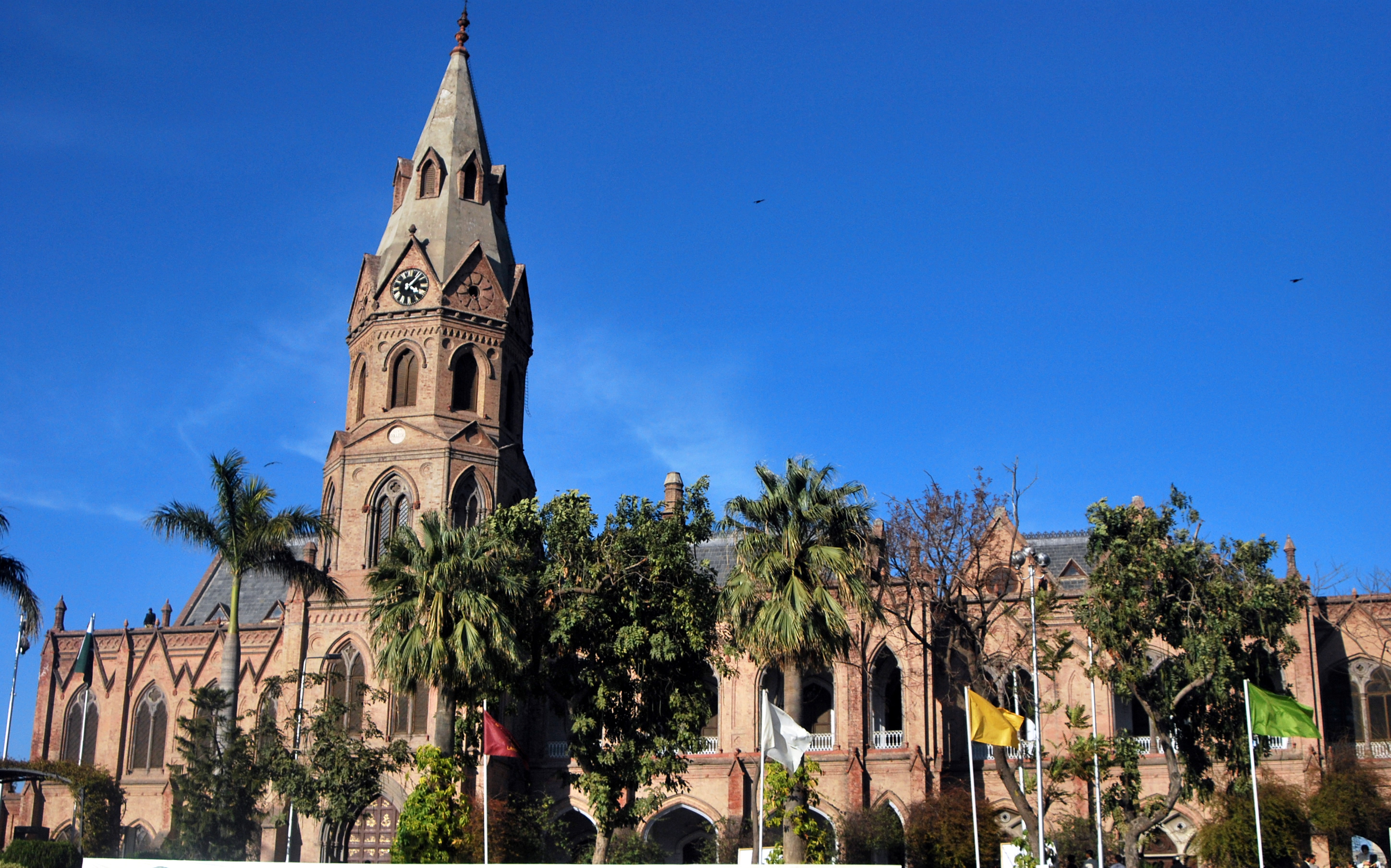

He is a secretary of Pakistan's renown Alumni Association of Government College University i.e. Old Ravian Union 1996.

== Exposure and contributions ==
He has travelled various countries as academic and a tourist. He participated in different international conferences where he read his papers or chaired the sessions. He is a member of or in charge of various committees and boards of Government College University including its Syndicate, Advance Board of studies, deans Committee, Admission Committee, Sports Board, Music and Welfare Society. He was instrumental in the establishment of Centre of Excellence China Studies in 2014. He is also running Endowment Fund Trust since 2006, established to give finance aid/scholarship to needy & deserving students and for developmental project of Government College University which is a unique and exemplary model and mechanism in all public sector universities of Pakistan. Every year, hundreds of needy students are being benefited by the Trust.

== See also ==
- Government College University, Lahore
- List of Ravians
- Asghar Zaidi Vice Chancellor GCU
- University of Bonn
- University of Central Punjab
