= Zahoor =

Zahoor is both a given name and a surname. Notable people with the name include:

- Zahoor ul Akhlaq (1941–1999), Pakistani artist
- Zahoor Elahi (born 1971), Pakistani cricketer
- Kamaliya Zahoor (born 1977), Ukrainian musician
- Mohammad Zahoor (born 1955), Ukraine based British businessman of Pakistani origin
- Saieen Zahoor (born 1936), Pakistani musician
- Sumaira Zahoor (born 1979), Pakistani athlete
- A. Zahoor Miah (1925–2007), Bangladeshi politician

== See also ==
- Chaudhry Zahoor Elahi (1917-1981), Pakistani politician
- Malik Zahoor Ahmad, Pakistani diplomat
- Syed Zahoor Qasim (1926-2015), Indian marine biologist
