= Javed Ashraf =

Pakistani academic and economist

Vice-Chancellor of Quaid-i-Azam University
- Incumbent
- Assumed office 13 October 2014 - 12 October 2018
- Chancellor: Mamnoon Hussain

Personal details
- Education: Government College University (Lahore) (M.A) Boston University (M.A) Northern Illinois University (Ph.D)

Javed Ashraf is an academic and economist who has led two of Pakistan's most distinguished academic institutions. He served as the Vice-Chancellor of Quaid-i-Azam University (QAU) from 13 October 2014 until October 12, 2018.

== Career ==
He was Director of the Institute of Business Administration (IBA) in Karachi from 2000 to 2002. Much of his career was in the United States where he last served at the University of St. Thomas (in Houston, TX). He served as the dean of Cameron School of Business at the University of St. Thomas, and also held the Cullen Endowed Chair in Economics. He has taught economics at University of Wisconsin, the University of Hartford, and the University of West Florida, where he taught for 13 years.

Ashraf earned his Ph.D. in economics from Northern Illinois University in 1986. He has two master's degrees from Boston University, and one from Government College University, Lahore.

Ashraf has been credited with expanding PhD faculty at Quaid-i-Azam University and increasing emphasis on research, which has led to improvement in QAU's rank in Times Higher Education rankings. QAU was the only Pakistani institution to be included among Top 500 global universities within Times Higher Education 2016-17 rankings. During his four-year tenure at QAU, the university was the top-ranked university in the country according to the rankings of the Higher Education Commission. As director of the Institute of Business Administration (IBA), Ashraf started the first four-year bachelor programs at any university in Pakistan -- a move that was later followed by most academic institutions in the rest of the country. He also hired a large number of doctorally qualified faculty at IBA.
