= Ibrar Hussain Rizvi =

Pakistani footballer (died 2026)

- Rizvi with Pakistan at the 1987 South Asian Games

Personal information
- Full name: Syed Ibrar Hussain Rizvi
- Date of birth: 12 March 1964
- Place of birth: Lahore, Pakistan
- Date of death: 15 March 2026 (aged 62)
- Place of death: Lahore, Pakistan
- Position: Midfielder

Youth career
- Wohaib

Senior career*
Years	Team	Apps	(Gls)
- Wohaib
- Pakistan Police

International career
1987–1988	Pakistan		
- * Club domestic league appearances and goals

Syed Ibrar Hussain Rizvi (Urdu: سید ابرار حسین رضوی; died 15 March 2026), also known as Ibrar Shah, was a Pakistani footballer who played as a midfielder. He represented the Pakistan national team in 1987–1988.

== Early life ==
Rizvi graduated from Government College University, Lahore.

== Club career ==
Rizvi started his career with Wohaib FC, and also represented Lahore Division and Pakistan Police at the National Football Championship.

== International career ==
Rizvi was first selected for the Pakistan national team for the 1987 South Asian Games. The next year, he played at the 1988 AFC Asian Cup qualification.

== Personal life and death ==
After retirement as a player, he became Inspector in the Punjab Police.

He died on 15 March 2026 in Lahore.
