= Barton Zwiebach =

Peruvian theoretical physicist (b. 1954)

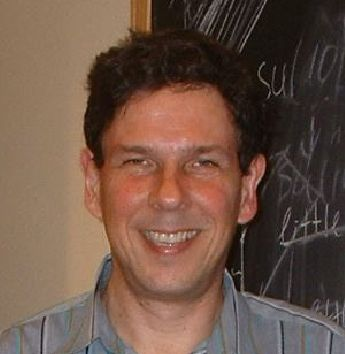
- Barton Zwiebach at Harvard University
- Born: October 4, 1954 (age 72); Lima, Peru
- Education: National University of Engineering; California Institute of Technology
- Scientific career
- Fields: String theory
- Workplaces: Harvard University; University of California, Berkeley; Massachusetts Institute of Technology
- Doctoral advisor: Murray Gell-Mann
- Doctoral students: Amer Iqbal

Barton Zwiebach Cantor (born October 4, 1954) is a Peruvian string theorist and professor at the Massachusetts Institute of Technology.

== Work ==
Zwiebach was born in Peru to a Jewish family and studied electrical engineering at the Universidad Nacional de Ingeniería in Peru, graduating in 1977. He subsequently attended graduate school in physics at the California Institute of Technology. He obtained his Ph.D. in 1983, working under the supervision of Murray Gell-Mann. He then held postdoctoral positions at the University of California, Berkeley and at the Massachusetts Institute of Technology (MIT). At MIT, he became an assistant professor of physics in 1987 and a permanent member of the faculty in 1994.

He is one of the world's leading experts in string field theory. He wrote the textbook A First Course in String Theory (2004, ISBN 0-521-83143-1), meant for undergraduates.
