= Farkhanda Manzoor =

Pakistani zoologist and academic

- Title: Vice-Chancellor

Academic background
- Education: Government College University (M.Sc., M.Ed.), University Law College (Post graduate degree), University of the Punjab (Ph.D.)
- Thesis: Morphometric studies on termite genus Odontotermes

Academic work
- Discipline: Zoologist
- Institutions: Ohio State University, Lahore College for Women University

Farkhanda Manzoor is a zoologist from Pakistan and a former Vice-Chancellor of Lahore College for Women University. Her research most often focuses on termite control, mosquitoes, insecticides, and tropical diseases and virology.

== Education ==
Manzoor studied at Government College University in Lahore, where she obtained a M.Sc. in zoology and an M.Ed. in Teacher Education; she also has a post-graduate degree in environmental law from University Law College in Lahore. She received her doctorate from the University of the Punjab with a thesis titled "Morphometric studies on termite genus Odontotermes".

== Career ==
After Manzoor completed her doctorate, she worked at the Ohio State University as a postdoctoral researcher.

Beginning in 2004, Manzoor was hired by Lahore College for Women University as an assistant professor, rising to a full professor of zoology in 2011. In January 2014, she took charge of the department as its head, and that October, she became the university's Director of Academics, in charge of reviewing departmental curricula from the entire university.

In April 2018, Manzoor was appointed as provisional Vice-Chancellor after the previous Vice-Chancellor Dr. Usma Qureshi was removed from the post. She held the office of Vice Chancellor LCWU until 5 July 2019. She has spoken on "the importance of education to build a strong and stable Pakistan" and "making high-quality higher education accessible for young female students of the country."
