= Bilal Zafar =

Pakistani Army officer (1982–2009)

Captain Bilal Zafar Abbasi Sitara-e-Basalat
- Born: 1 January 1982; Rawalpindi, Punjab
- Died: 17 May 2009 (aged 27); Peochar Valley, Swat
- Military career
- Allegiance: Pakistan
- Branch: Pakistan Army
- Service years: 2003–2009
- Rank: Captain
- Nickname: Bali
- Service number: PA-40561
- Units: 42 Baloch Regiment (MIB); Special Services Group
- Conflicts: (UNOCI); Operation Rah-e-Rast †
- Awards: Sitara-e-Basalat

Captain Bilal Zafar Abbasi (1982–2009) (Urdu: بلال ظفر) was a Pakistan Army officer who received Sitara-e-Basalat on the 62nd Independence Day of Pakistan. He was a captain in the 42 Baloch Regiment (MIB).

== Early life ==
=== Education ===
He was born in Rawalpindi on 2 February 1982. Bilal Zafar got his early education from St. Paul's Cambridge School, Rawalpindi and Government College University, Lahore.

=== Military Background ===
He belonged to a prominent family with a military background. His father, Zafar Tajamul, is a retired captain. His grandfather, Colonel Tajammal Hussain was a commissioned officer in the British Indian Army. Colonel Hussain also fought in World War II and remained a Prisoner of war. Later on, he joined the Indian National Army and after Independence, he opted for the Pakistan Army. He volunteered for the war of the independence of Kashmir (Indo-Pakistani War of 1947–1948). He raised and commanded the first Bagh Brigade and fought on the Poonch front. For his valour and bravery, he was awarded the medal of Hilal-e-Kashmir. He was the Defence Secretary of the Azad Kashmir government. Later on, he raised the Civil Defence Department in the Azad Kashmir government.

The great-grandfather of Captain Bilal, Subedar Lal Khan, fought in World War I. He lost his life in action. For his death in combat, he was awarded the Indian Order of Merit - the second-highest military award.

Captain Bilals' brother, Captain Zarrar, is also a commando officer in the Pakistan army and has participated in many operations.

== Military career ==
He joined the Pakistan Army in 2001 and was commissioned into 42 Baloch Regiment(Al-Havi) on 12 October 2003. Later, he joined the SSG. He also served in United Nations peacekeeping mission in Ivory Coast.

== Death ==
Second Battle of Swat also known as Operation Rah-e-Rast, began in May 2009. The Pakistan Army launched a defensive against Tehrik-i-Taliban Pakistan militants in a fight for control of the Swat district of Pakistan. The SSG started an operation 'Janbaz' to clear Swat valley from militants. His company was given the task to clear Swat-Peochar Road. During this operation, Captain Bilal Zafar was martyred on 17 May 2009 after being hit in the chest with a rocket launched from a rocket launcher. One day after his death, he was buried in his native village Kehror Kotli Sattian on 18 May 2009. The Government of Pakistan announced the Sitara-e-Basalat for him on the 62nd Independence Day of Pakistan.
