= Mirza Athar Baig =

Pakistani novelist

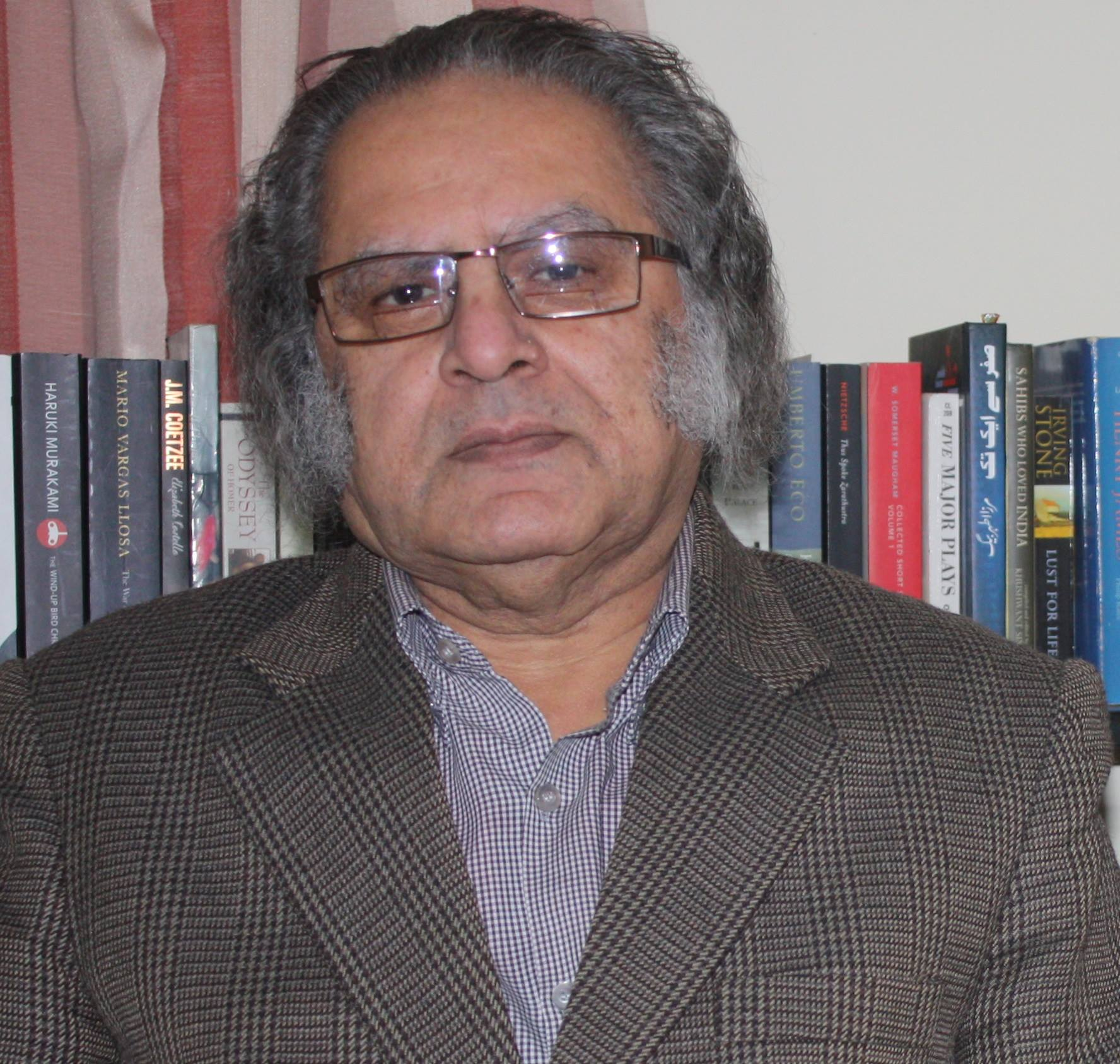
- Baig at his home in Lahore
- Born: March 7, 1950 (age 76); Lahore, Pakistan
- Education: Government College University, Lahore
- Occupations: Novelist, short story writer, screenwriter, philosopher
- Spouse: Nabila Athar (1953–2011)
- Children: Sarim Baig, Basim Baig
- Writing career
- Notable works: Ghulam Bagh, Sifar se aik tak, Hasan Ki Surat-e-Hal
- Notable awards: Pride of Performance

Mirza Athar Baig (Urdu: مرزا اطہر بیگ, born 7 March 1950) is a Pakistani novelist, playwright and short story writer. He was born in Sharaqpur, Punjab. Both his parents were school teachers and encouraged him to read widely from a young age. He is associated with the Department of Philosophy, at Government College University in Lahore. His fiction works include three novels, a short story collection, and numerous plays for television.

His first novel, Ghulam Bagh (Slave Garden), is considered one of the central works of literature in the Urdu language. The novel is very popular in Pakistan and has also received critical acclaim. Five editions have been published since its initial publication in 2006.

In addition to Ghulam Bagh, a collection of Baig's short stories, titled Beh Afsana (Anti-Story) was published in 2008. His second novel, Sifar se aik tak (From Zero to One), was published in 2010. In July 2010, Dawn newspaper published a review of Sifar se aik tak, commenting on its popularity with the youth.

His third novel, Hassan Ki Surat-e-Hal (Hassan's State of Affairs), was published in 2014 and has received critical acclaim in Pakistan as well as in international media. It was translated into English, and the translation received favourable reviews. In Hasan Ki Surat-e-Hal, Baig experiments with different narrative structures. He uses surrealist and poststructuralist theories and techniques to expand the formal limits of the Urdu novel. He has been credited with introducing postmodernism to Urdu literature by literary critics, but his own assessment of this topic is rather different: "Generally, I don’t say much when labelled as ‘post-modern’ because I consider it as a naïve and simplistic categorization. The ' modernity' we have in our parts of the world is a vastly different socio-historical process than western modernity, out of which the so-called post-modernity evolved. What sort of ‘post-modernity’ would bloom out of our ‘modernity’? Something is laughable about it but a lot is poignantly serious." The book's formal experimentations arise from Baig's belief in states of wonder as central to philosophy as well as literature.

== Works ==
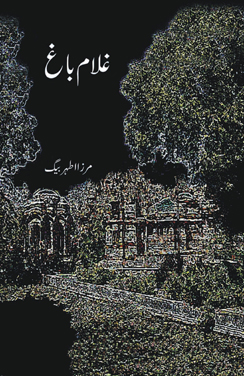
First edition of Ghulam Bagh

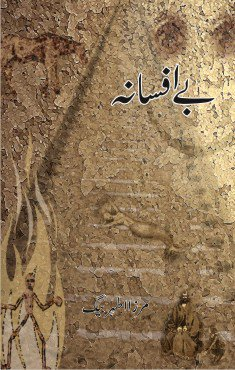
First edition of Beh Afsana

=== Novels ===
- Ghulam Bagh (غلام باغ) — 2006
- Sifr se Aik Tak: Cyberspace ke Munshi ki Sarguzasht (صفر سے ایک تک: سائبر اسپیس کے منشی کی سرگزشت) — 2010
- Hasan Ki Surat-e-Hal: Khali Jaghein Pur Karo (حسن کی صورتِ حال: خالی جگہیں پُر کرو) — 2014
- Khauf Tamasha (خوف تماشہ) — 2026

=== Short stories ===
- Beh Afsana

=== Drama (Serial) ===
- Daldal : دلدل
- Doosra Asmaan : دوسرا آسماں
- Gehray Pani: گہرے پانی
- Hissar: حصار
- Rog: روگ
- Khwab Tamasha: خواب تماشہ
- Nashaib: نشیب
- Yeh Azad Log: یہ آزاد لوگ
- Pataal : پاتال
- Baila (Punjabi) بیلا
- Sikar Dupair (Punjabi) سکر دوپہر
- Akhri Show (Punjabi) آخری شو

=== Long Play ===
- Catwalk
- Lafz Ayina Hai:لفظ آئینہ ہے
- Dhund Mein Raasta: دھند میں راستہ
- Bewazan Log: بے وزن لوگ
