= Hannah Markwig =

German mathematician

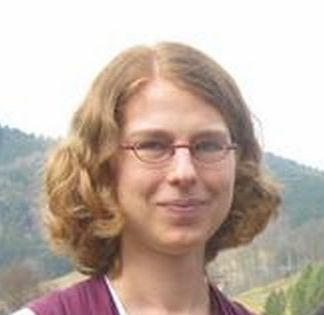
Markwig at Oberwolfach, 2012

Hannah Markwig (born 19 November 1980) is a German mathematician specializing in tropical geometry. In 2010 she won both the Heinz Maier-Leibnitz Prize of the Deutsche Forschungsgemeinschaft and the Helene Lange Prize for her research.

Markwig studied mathematics at the University of Kaiserslautern beginning in 1999, and completed her PhD there in 2006. Her dissertation, supervised by Andreas Gathmann and reviewed by Bernd Sturmfels, was The Enumeration of Plane Tropical Curves. After postdoctoral study at the Institute for Mathematics and its Applications and the University of Michigan, she became an assistant professor in the Courant Research Center at the University of Göttingen. She moved in 2011 to Saarland University, and then in 2016 to the University of Tübingen, where she is a professor of geometry in the department of mathematics.
