= Raheem Khan =

Principal of King Edward Medical University

- Born: 1838
- Died: 1904 (aged 65–66); Lahore
- Occupation: Doctor

Khan Bahadur Doctor Raheem Khan was the first Muslim Principal of King Edward Medical University (called King Edward Medical College at that time). He was awarded the title of Khan Bahadur on 13 March 1872 by British as a personal distinction of his services to the medical profession.

== Life ==
Raheem Khan was educated at Dacca College and the Medical College, Calcutta, where he became a sub-Assistant Surgeon in 1858 and was quickly promoted because of his high attainments. In 1860 he was appointed to Medical College of Lahore, where he introduced a knowledge of European medical science among the chief Hakims and native physicians of the Punjab Province. He became a fellow of the University of Lahore and received the rank of Honorary Surgeon on 1 January 1877. He had five sons. He died in 1904 and his final resting place is in University of Engineering and Technology, Lahore.

== Books ==
He wrote several books:

- Amrz al-ibyn (1881)
- Rislah-i tibb muta'alliqah 'adlat (1881)
- The Principles and Practice of midwifery (1879)
