= Cameron School of Business =

Business school in Wilmington, North Carolina

Coordinates: 34.22598°N 77.86943°W

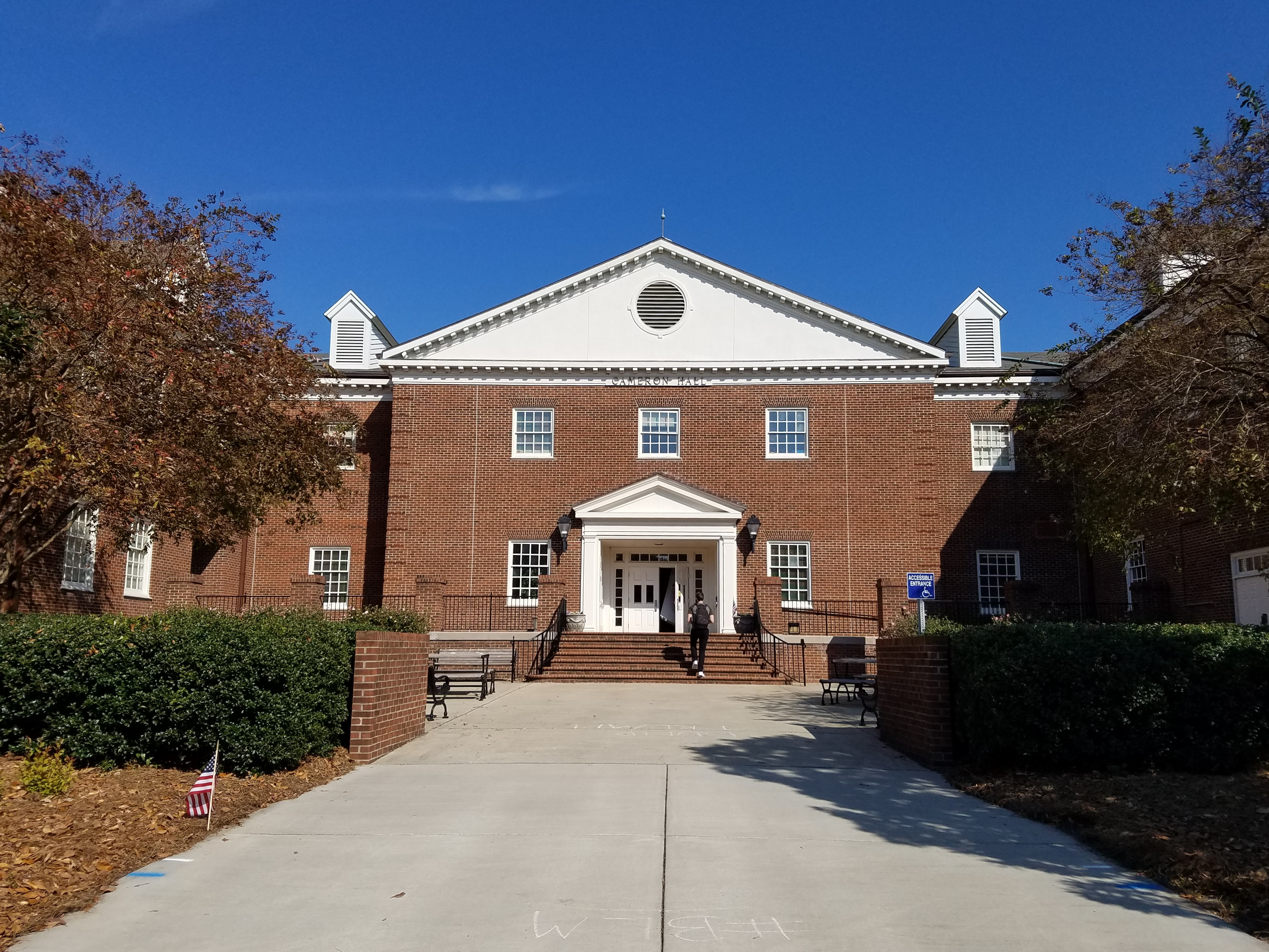
- Affiliations: UNC Wilmington
- Dean: Dr. Robert Burrus
- Location: Wilmington, North Carolina, United States
- Website: csb.uncw.edu

The Cameron School of Business is the business school of the University of North Carolina at Wilmington in Wilmington, North Carolina, United States. As of July 2020, it enrolls 1,680 undergraduate students and 175 graduate students per year. Although UNCW was established in 1947, the first bachelor's degrees were not awarded until the mid 1960s. In 1979, the Department of Business and Economics became the Cameron School of Business.

All of Cameron School of Business' degree programs are fully accredited by the Association to Advance Collegiate Schools of Business (AACSB). This recognition places the college in the top 30% of business education programs. The graduate programs include the Professional Master of Business Administration (MBA), the International Master of Business Administration, the Master of Science in Accountancy, and the Master of Science in Computer Science and Information Systems.

UNCW was recognized by The Princeton Review as one of the best institutions in the nation to attend to pursue a Master's of Business Administration (MBA) degree. The Professional MBA program in UNCW's Cameron School of Business is listed in the 2016 edition of The Princeton Review's "Best 295 Business Schools."
