= Malik Zahoor Ahmad =

Pakistani diplomat and Middle East expert

Malik Zahoor Ahmad is a former Pakistani diplomat. He has served as the Chief Coordinator of the Pakistan Trilateral Secretariat (Afghanistan, Pakistan and the U.S.) and the Director General of NAPHIS. His foreign service career has included two posts in the United States, most recently as Minister of Information and Spokesman at the Embassy of Pakistan in Washington D.C. (1997–1999).

Malik Zahoor Ahmad earned a master's degree in mass communications from the University of Leicester, UK and also a B.A. in economics and sociology from Government College, Lahore.

He currently maintains a US residence in McLean, Virginia with his wife and two sons.
