= Jürgen Herzog =

German mathematician (1941-2024)

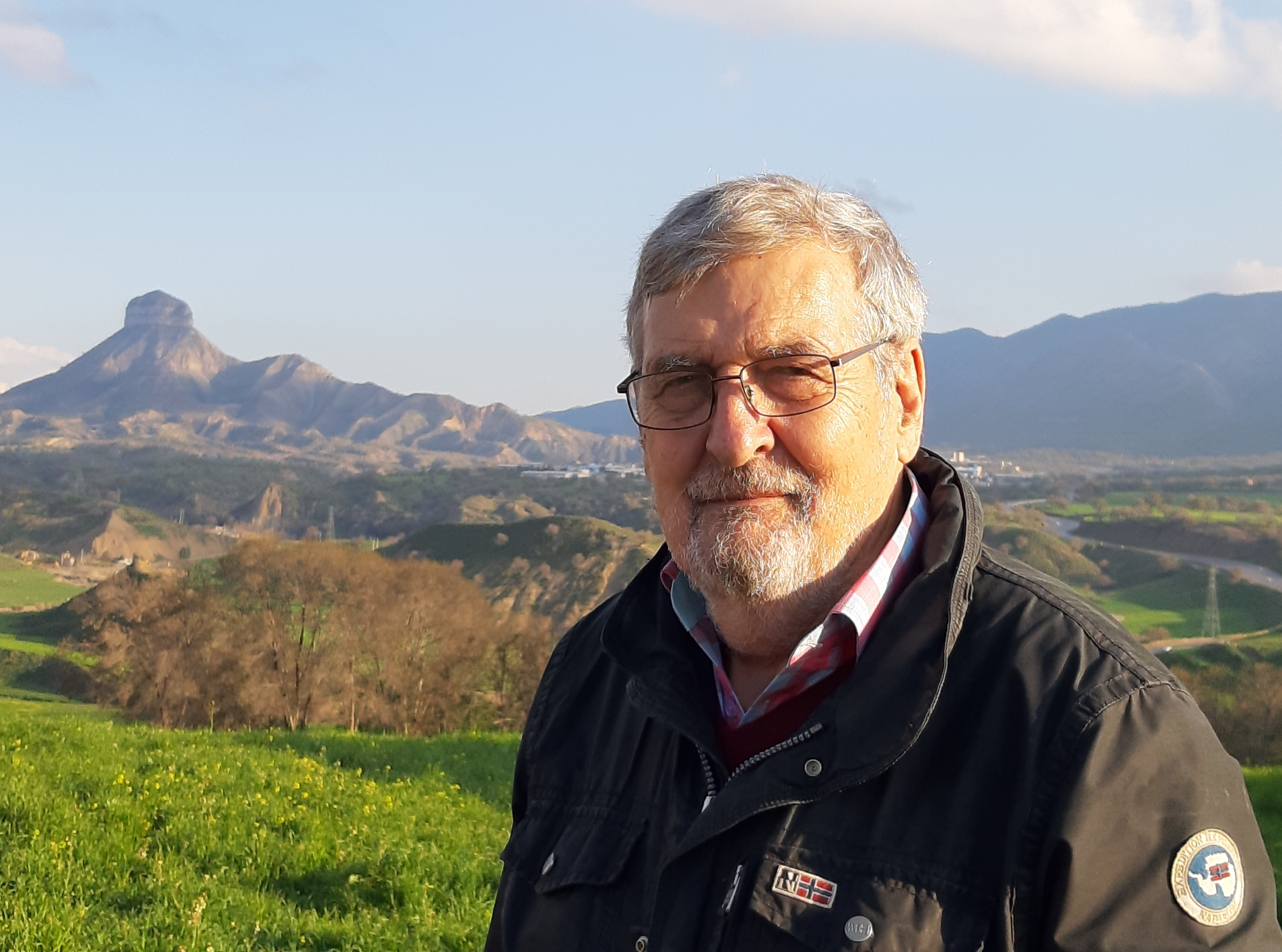
- Herzog in 2019
- Born: Jürgen Reinhard Gerhard Herzog; 21 December 1941; Heidelberg, Germany
- Died: 23 April 2024 (aged 82)
- Education: Louisiana State University; University of Regensburg; Purdue University
- Scientific career
- Fields: Mathematics
- Workplaces: University of Duisburg-Essen
- Doctoral advisor: Ernst A. Kunz
- Website: Official page

Jürgen Reinhard Gerhard Herzog (German: [ˈjʏʁɡn̩ ˈhɛʁtsoːk]; 21 December 1941 – 23 April 2024) was an Emeritus Professor of Mathematics at University of Duisburg-Essen, in Essen, Germany. From 1969 to 1975, he was Lecturer at University of Regensburg and from 1975 to 2009 a professor of Mathematics at University of Duisburg-Essen.

== Biography ==
Herzog was born in Heidelberg on 21 December 1941 and raised in Eberbach. After military service in the German Army, he enrolled at the University of Kiel from 1963 and began studying mathematics and physics. Herzog transferred to the University of Heidelberg in 1964, and completed his undergraduate studies there. He received his Ph.D. with a thesis titled, Generators and Relations of Abelian Semigroups and Semigroup Rings at Louisiana State University in 1969 under the supervision of Ernst A. Kunz. He completed his habilitation at the University of Regensburg in 1974. He was an expert in the field of commutative algebra and its interactions to other mathematical fields such as combinatorics.

In 2026, the Journal of Pure and Applied Algebra published a special issue titled Celebrating the mathematical contributions of Jürgen Herzog.

== Personal life ==
Herzog died on 23 April 2024 in Germany, following a sudden heart attack.

== Selected publications ==
- Bruns, Winfred, Herzog, Jürgen, (1993). Cohen-Macaulay rings, Cambridge studies in advanced mathematics 39, Cambridge University Press.
- Herzog, Jürgen, Hibi, Takayuki, (2011). Monomial Ideals, Graduate Text in Mathematics.
- Ene, Viviana, Herzog, Jürgen, (2012). Gröbner Bases in Commutative Algebra, Graduate Studies in Mathematics, 130. American Mathematical Society, Providence, RI.
- Herzog, Jürgen, Hibi, Takayuki, Ohsugi, Hidefumi, (2018). Binomial Ideals, Springer Graduate Texts in Mathematics.
