= Amer Iqbal =

Pakistani-American theoretical physicist

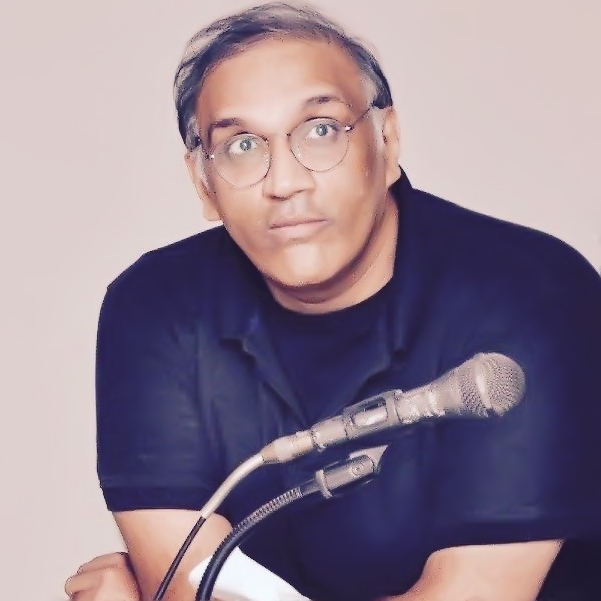
- Education: Massachusetts Institute of Technology (MIT)
- Known for: D-Branes in Massive LG Theories; Mysterious duality Refined Topological Vertex; M-Strings
- Spouse: Saadiya Khan
- Awards: Abdus Salam Award; COMSTECH Award for Physics
- Scientific career
- Fields: Theoretical Physics
- Workplaces: University of Washington; Harvard University; University of Texas at Austin
- Doctoral advisor: Barton Zwiebach

Amer Iqbal is a Pakistani-American theoretical physicist. He is primarily known for his work in string theory and mathematical physics.

== Biography ==
Amer Iqbal has a Doctorate in Theoretical physics from Massachusetts Institute of Technology. He carried out his doctoral research under the supervision of Barton Zwiebach. He has held a faculty position at University of Washington and postdoctoral positions at the University of Texas at Austin and at Harvard University. He also worked as an associate professor of physics at Lahore University of Management Sciences and Abdus Salam School of Mathematical Sciences. He currently resides in Dallas, Texas.

Amer Iqbal was awarded the Abdus Salam Award for physics in 2012 for his work on superstring theory and its relationship with supersymmetry and gauge theories. He was also awarded the COMSTECH Award for physics in 2020 for his work on six dimensional little strings and their geometric engineering using F-theory on elliptic Calabi-Yau threefolds.
