= Asghar Zaidi =

Pakistani researcher

Asghar Zaidi TI
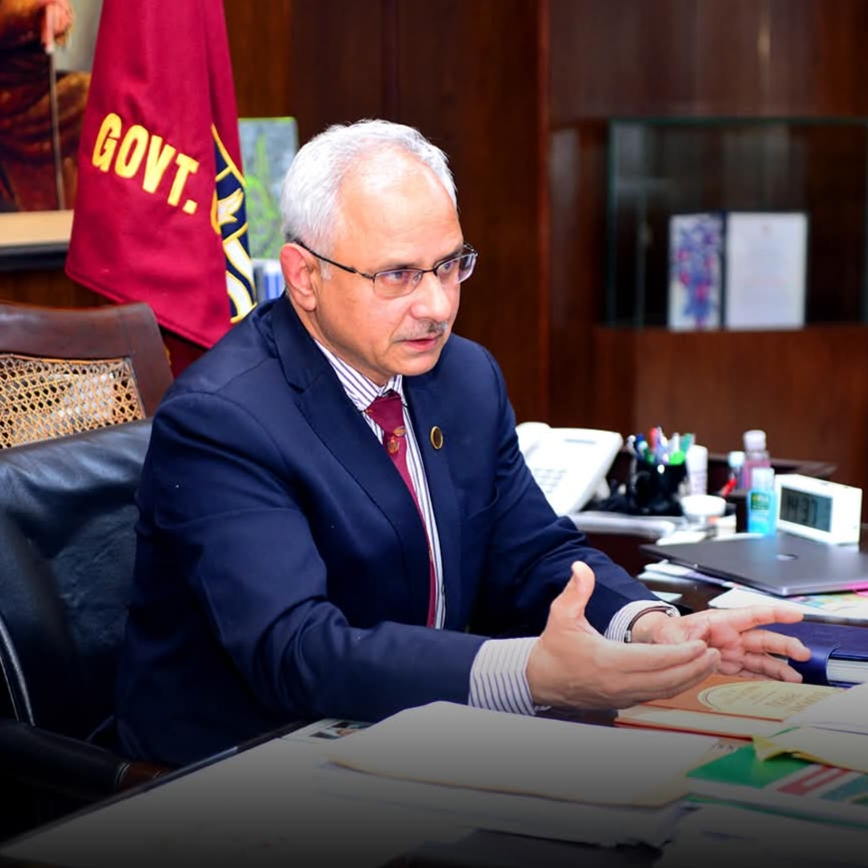

Rector Karachi School of Business & Leadership
- Incumbent
- Assumed office March 2026
- Preceded by: Ahmad Junaid

Provost University of Management and Technology (Pakistan)
- In office December 2024 – March 2026

4th Vice Chancellor Government College University Lahore
- In office 24 October 2019 – 24 October 2023
- Preceded by: Prof. Dr. Hassan Amir Shah
- Succeeded by: Prof. M. Omer Chaudhry

Vice Chancellor (Additional Charge) University of the Punjab
- In office 04 November 2022 – 15 January 2023
- Preceded by: Prof. Niaz Ahmad Akhtar
- Succeeded by: Prof. Dr. Muhammad Ali

Personal details
- Education: University of Oxford; Erasmus University Rotterdam; Quaid-i-Azam University; Government College University Lahore
- Website: asgharzaidi.com
- Scientific career
- Fields: Economics
- Workplaces: University of Oxford; London School of Economics; Seoul National University; University of Southampton; European Centre for Social Welfare Policy and Research; Organisation for Economic Co-operation and Development; Erasmus University Rotterdam; Department for Work and Pensions; Pakistan Bureau of Statistics; Tilburg University
- Doctoral advisor: Tony Atkinson

Asghar Zaidi (Urdu: اصغر زیدی) is a social policy analyst and population ageing researcher. He is the former 4th Vice Chancellor and 31st head of the Government College University Lahore (GCU), from October 2019 to October 2023. Previously, he served as Professor in International Social Policy at the University of Southampton, Professor of Social Gerontology at Seoul National University, South Korea, and as a Visiting Professor at the London School of Economics.

== Education ==
Asghar Zaidi attended the Government College University, Lahore (1981 to 1984) from where he obtained his bachelor's degree in Mathematics, Statistics and Economics (First Division). He did his Master in Economics (1985–1987) from Quaid-i-Azam University, Islamabad. In 1988, he moved to Netherlands from where he obtained his master's degree in Development Studies (Economic Policy and Planning) with Distinction in Thesis from the International Institute of Social Studies of Erasmus University Rotterdam. He obtained his PhD Degree (1997–2004) in Economics from the University of Oxford, UK under the guidance of Tony Atkinson.

== Research, honours and awards ==
Asghar Zaidi's research interests are Population ageing and its social and economic consequences, pension policy and its impact on fiscal and social sustainability of welfare states, Labour Market status and well-being of persons with disabilities, Poverty and social exclusion among older people and Dynamic microsimulation model. He has worked as a researcher in many top organizations and Institutes across the World including University of Oxford, Erasmus University Rotterdam, London School of Economics and many more. He has received many Awards and Grants to carry out the Research Projects.

The Government of Shanghai has awarded him the 1,000 Foreign Experts Scholarship in 2019.

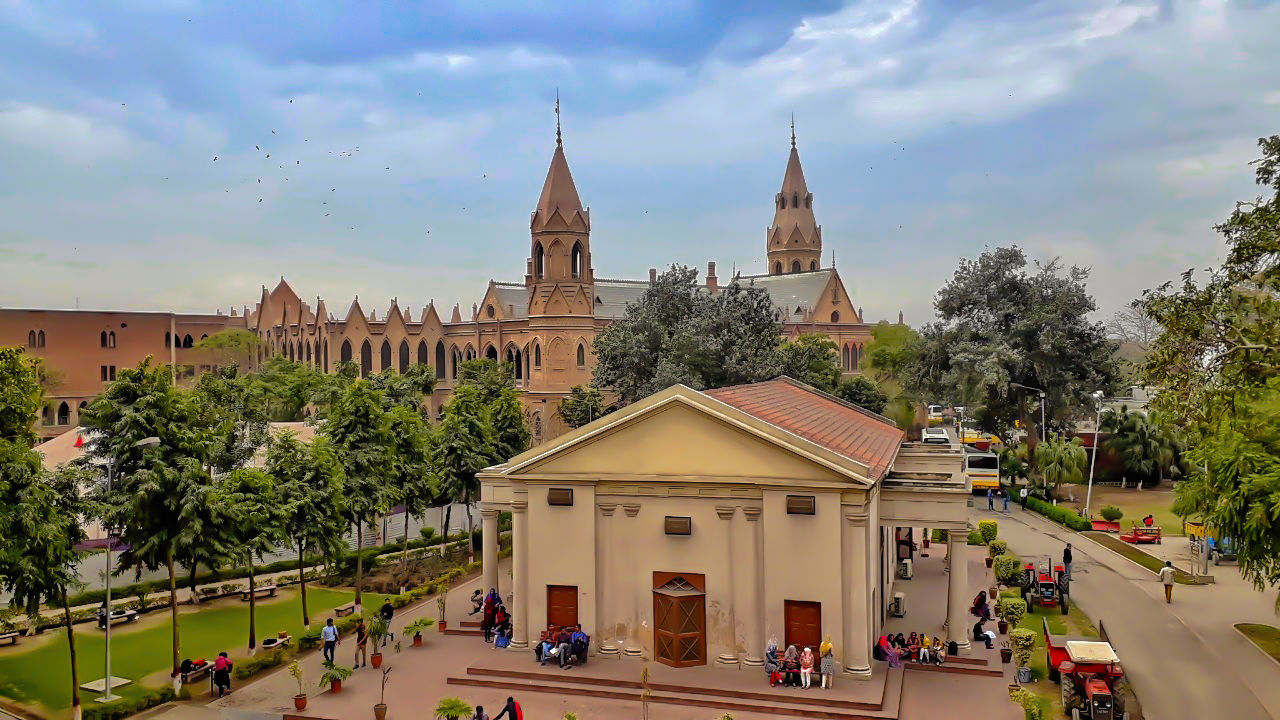
GCU Old Building of Languages

== Publications ==
=== Books ===
- Building Evidence for Active Ageing Policies Active Ageing Index and its Potential with A.O., Harper, S., Howse, K., Lamura, G., Perek-Białas, Basingstoke, UK, 2018.
- Ageing, Health and Pensions in Europe: An Economic and Social Policy Perspective with L. Bovenberg and A. van Soest, Basingstoke, UK, 2010.
- New Frontiers in Microsimulation Modelling, with Ann Harding and Paul Williamson, Surrey, UK, 2009.
- Well-Being of Older People in Ageing Societies, Surrey, UK, 2008.
- Mainstreaming Ageing: Indicators to Monitor Sustainable Progress and Policies with Bernd Marin, Surrey,

=== Journalistic articles ===
- "Dementia challenges in Pakistan: A case study of low and middle-income country", 27 February 2019
- "Which countries make the most of their older people?", 11 May 2015
- "Which is the best country to grow old in?", 26 November 2014

Academic offices
Preceded by Prof. Dr. Hassan Amir Shah	Vice Chancellor of Government College University Lahore; October 24, 2019 – present	Incumbent
