= Amjad Saddiq =

Pakistani cricketer (born 1959)

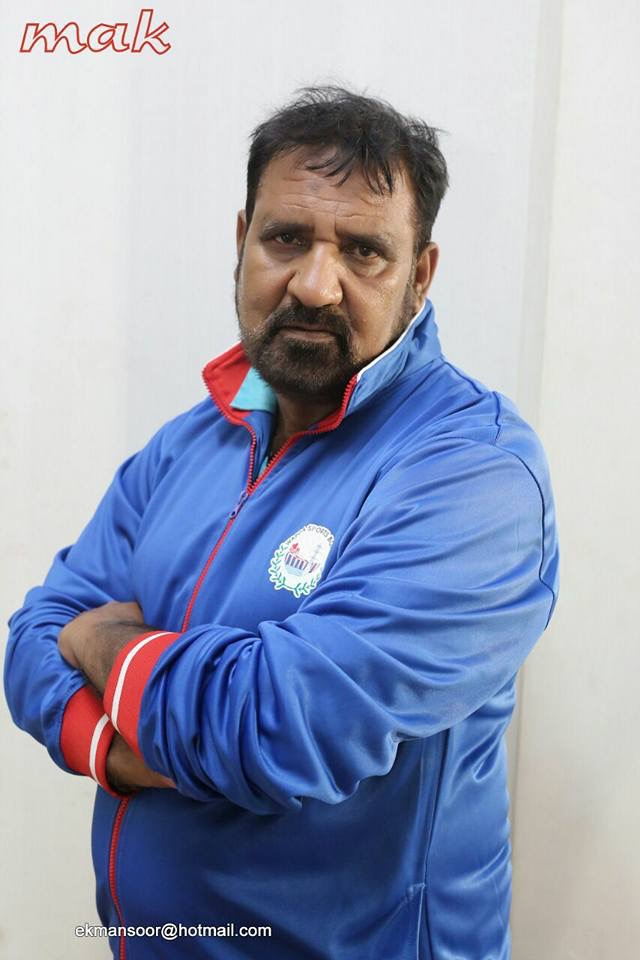

Personal information
- Full name: Amjad Saddiq
- Born: 12 December 1959 (age 66); Lahore, Punjab, Pakistan
- Batting: Right-handed
- Bowling: Off-break
- Role: All-rounder, Coach

Domestic team information
- Years: Team
- 1981–1988: Water and Power Development Authority

Career statistics
| Competition | FC | List A |
|---|---|---|
| Matches | 14 | 94 |
| Runs scored | 656 | 2805 |
| Batting average | 31.23 | 36.90 |
| 100s/50s | 1/4 | 3/16 |
| Top score | 100* | 122* |
| Balls bowled | - | 388 |
| Wickets | 2 | 10 |
| Bowling average | 57.00 | 29.60 |
| 5 wickets in innings | 0 | 0 |
| 10 wickets in match | 0 | n/a |
| Best bowling | 1/6 | 1/6 |
| Catches/stumpings | 5/-; | 42/– |
- Source: ESPNcricinfo

Amjad Saddiq (born 12 December 1959) is a Pakistani former first-class cricketer who played for Water and Power Development Authority cricket team between 1981 and 1988, including some time as captain.

He started his career as an all-rounder and in 1986/1987 WAPDA placed 3rd position in Quaid e Azam trophy under his captaincy. In 1992 Saddiq was appointed as a head coach of WAPDA cricket team in Domestic circuit.

== Coaching career ==
After retiring from first-class cricket last in 1992, Saddiq became the head coach of the Water and Power Development Authority cricket team side due to his service as captain. Saddiq is a qualified Pakistan Cricket Board Level 1 and 2 coach. WAPDA won 1 Quaid-e-Azam Trophy and 2 National one day titles and 5 times runner-up under his coaching in Pakistan domestic events.

In December 2019, Amjad Saddiq has been retired from Pakistan WAPDA cricket Assistant manager and Head Coaching role due to Pakistan's Prime Minister Imran Khan revamped the domestic cricket structure in Pakistan, excluding departmental teams in favour of regional sides, therefore ending the participation of the team.[4] The Pakistan Cricket Board (PCB) was criticised in removing departmental sides, with players voicing their concern to revive the teams.[5]

== Achievements as coach ==
Quaid-e-Azam Trophy

- 2002/03 (quarter-final)
- 2016/17 (winner)
- 2017/18 (Runner Up)

Patron's Trophy

- 2006/07 (Quadrangular Stage)

National One-day Championship

- 1997/98 (final round)
- 1998/99 (final round)
- 1999/2000 (semi-final)
- 2001/02 (semi-final)
- 2002/03 (runner-up)
- 2004/05 (winner)
- 2005/06 (semi-final)
- 2007/08 (Super Eight)
- 2010/11 (semi-final)
- 2014/15 (winner)
- 2016/17(runner-up)
- 2017/18(runner-up)
- 2018/19(runner-up)
