= Government College University, Lahore =

Public research university in Lahore, Pakistan

Government College
- گورنمنٹ کالج
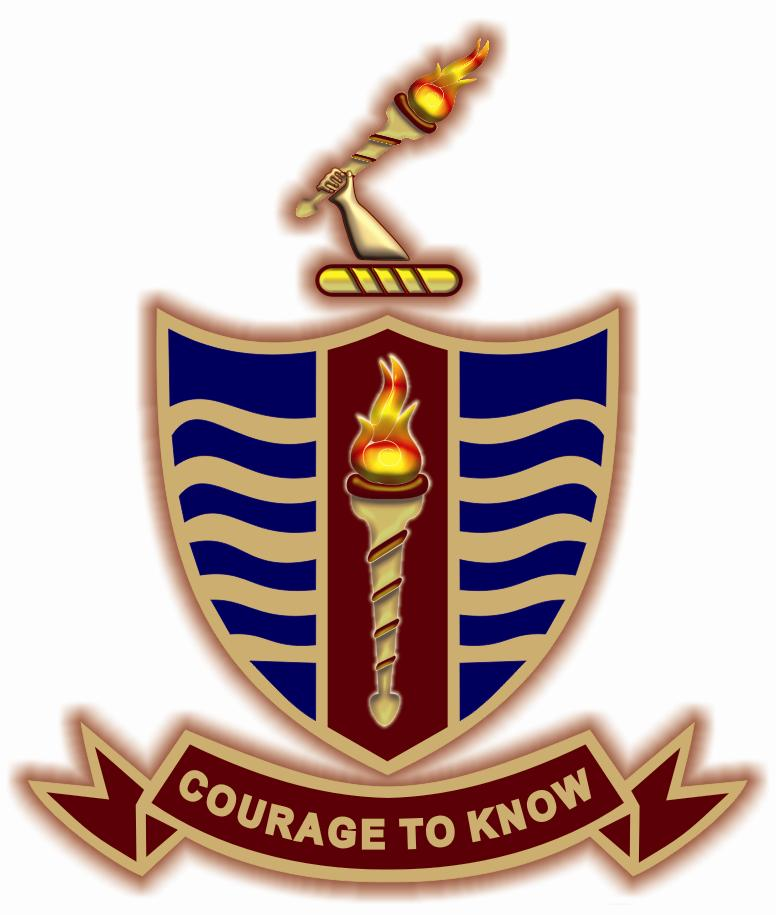
- Motto: Educating People for Tomorrow (historical); Courage to Know (present)
- Type: Public
- Established: 1 January 1864; 162 years ago
- Accreditation: Higher Education Commission; Pakistan Engineering Council; Pakistan Bar Council; Board of Intermediate and Secondary Education, Lahore
- Chancellor: Governor of the Punjab
- Vice-Chancellor: Dr. Muhammad Omar Chaudhry
- Academic staff: 454
- Administrative staff: 103
- Students: 17,994
- Undergraduates: 10,567
- Postgraduates: 1,707
- Doctoral students: 769
- Other students: Intermediate (4,882); Diploma/Certifications (216)
- Location: Katchery Road, Lahore, Punjab, Pakistan
- Campus: Urban
- Colours: Maroon
- Website: gcu.edu.pk

The Government College, Lahore also known by its acronym GC is a public research university in Lahore, Punjab, Pakistan. Founded as Government College, Lahore, in 1864 under the British Raj, it was granted university status in 2002 and named as Government College University, Lahore. While keeping its university status intact, the Punjab Government officially dropped the word 'University' and restored the original name of the institution, Government College, Lahore, on 23 October 2026. Higher Education Department of the Government of Punjab issued a letter in this regard signed by its Section Officer (Public Universities-I) on the said date. In this connection, the letter referred to the Public Sector Universities Act, 2026 (Act XXIII of 2026), published in the {Punjab Gazette (Extraordinary) on 6 May 2026. It is considered one of the most prestigious institutions in Pakistan.

== Overview ==
In 1864, Government College was established by the British government in India. After being elevated to university status in 2002, it has become one the 10 largest educational institutions in Pakistan, with a student body of over 12,000. It has 32 academic departments, segregated into five faculties. There are five research centers, focused on academic and industrial research and development projects. It secured the second place in the general category by the Higher Education Commission (HEC) in 2013. It has the highest graduation rate in the country, with an average of 94.6% annually. In Government College, the medium of instruction is English.

Government College is noted for its historical roots and produced notable scholars such as poet-philosopher Allama Muhammad Iqbal, Nobel laureates Har Gobind Khorana and Abdus Salam, former president of both the United Nations General Assembly and the International Court of Justice Muhammad Zafarullah Khan, scholar and novelist couple Bano Qudsia and Ashfaq Ahmed. Among its graduates are also four prime ministers and one caretaker prime minister of Pakistan.

== History ==
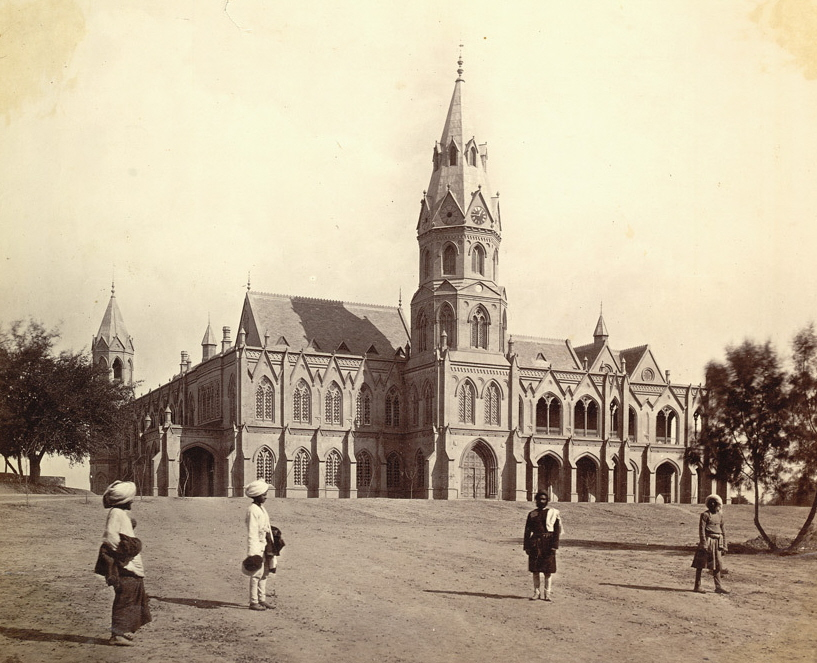
Government College, Lahore circa 1880

Originally, the establishment of a central college in Lahore was sanctioned in 1856 by the British Raj, given that the teachers were from University of Oxford, University of Cambridge, Dublin University HC or Durham University. Under the leadership of Gottlieb Wilhelm Leitner, a professor of Arabic and Islamic Law at King's College London, the college was established on 1 January 1864, located in the Palace of Raja Dhyan Singh Haveli (Dogra prime minister of Sikh ruler Maharaja Ranjit Singh of Lahore) inside Walled City of Lahore, as an affiliated college of Calcutta University.

In April 1871, the college moved to a large Bungalow near Anarkali Bazaar. In 1873, its location was again changed to another house called Rahim Khan's Kothi due to rapidly increasing student strength. It moved to its present building in 1876.

The first principal was Gottlieb Wilhelm Leitner, whose name is closely attached to the college. In 1882, Leitner was very instrumental in laying the foundation of Punjab University, Lahore. Thereafter, the college would remain affiliated with Punjab University for 115 years. In 1997, government of the Punjab gave Government College autonomy in all affairs and granted degree awarding status.

In 2002, it was promoted to university status by the government of Punjab; the word college was retained in its title for preserving its historical roots.

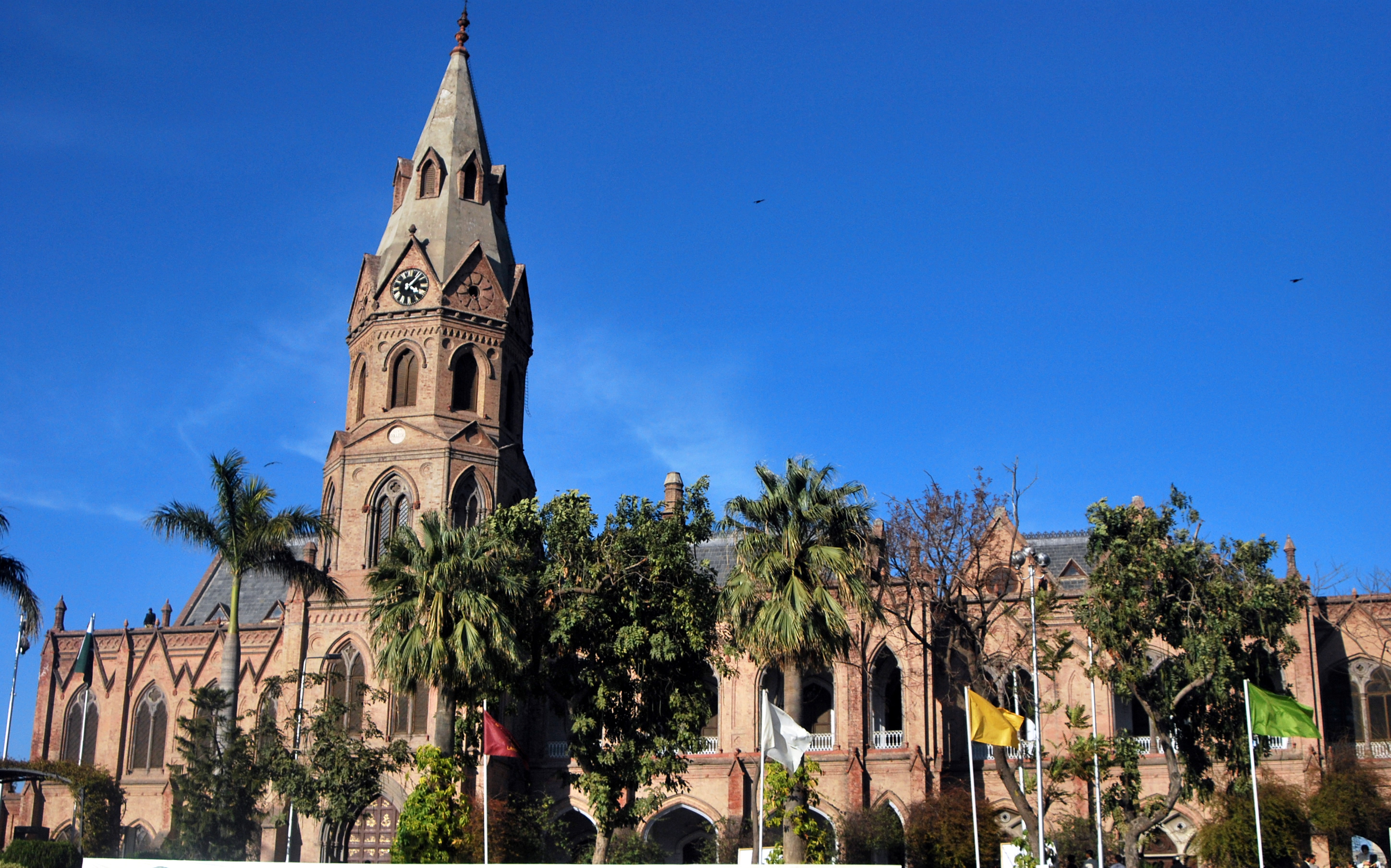
Main Building, GC

== Campus ==
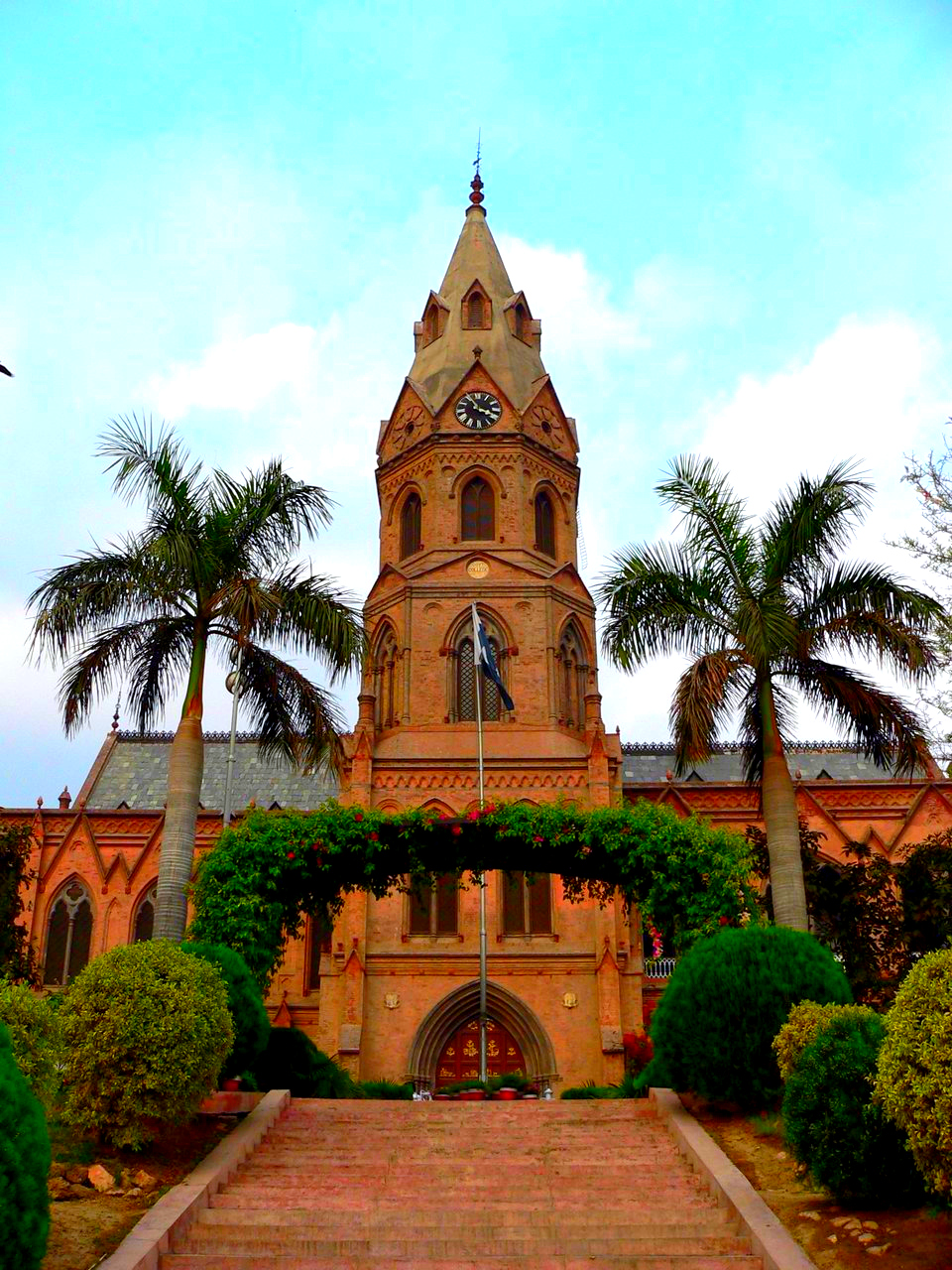
GC's iconic tower

=== Old Campus ===
Positioned in Downtown Lahore, it is located at the junction of The Mall, Lahore and the Lower Mall, surrounded by main business and administrative areas, schools, colleges and Punjab University old Campus. The main building was designed by W. Purdon and completed in 1877 at a cost of Rs. 320,000. In the centre of the main building stands a 176' tall clock tower. Built during the colonial era, the main building reflects the neo-Gothic tradition, with broad verandahs and elevated ceilings. A large ground accompanies the main building, alluded to as the "Oval Ground". In 2019, the ground was renamed "The Leitner Oval", in honour of Gottlieb Wilhelm Leitner, the first principal of the institute. To meet the needs of an increasing number of students, several buildings and blocks have been commissioned which include a postgraduate block, a new block for intermediate students and a bachelors' block which is accessible by an overhead bridge. The main campus is spread over 56 acres along the Anarkali Bazaar, one of the oldest surviving markets in Lahore.

=== Kala Shah Kaku Campus ===
On 24 August 2019, the Kala Shah Kaku campus was inaugurated which is known as GCU KSK campus. The campus is spread over 370 acres, able to house 25,000 students, 1,250 teachers and 650 staff members. Two hostels are available for accommodation.

On 24 September 2020, the new campus was formally opened to students. A bus shuttle service will operate between both campuses.

== Emblem ==
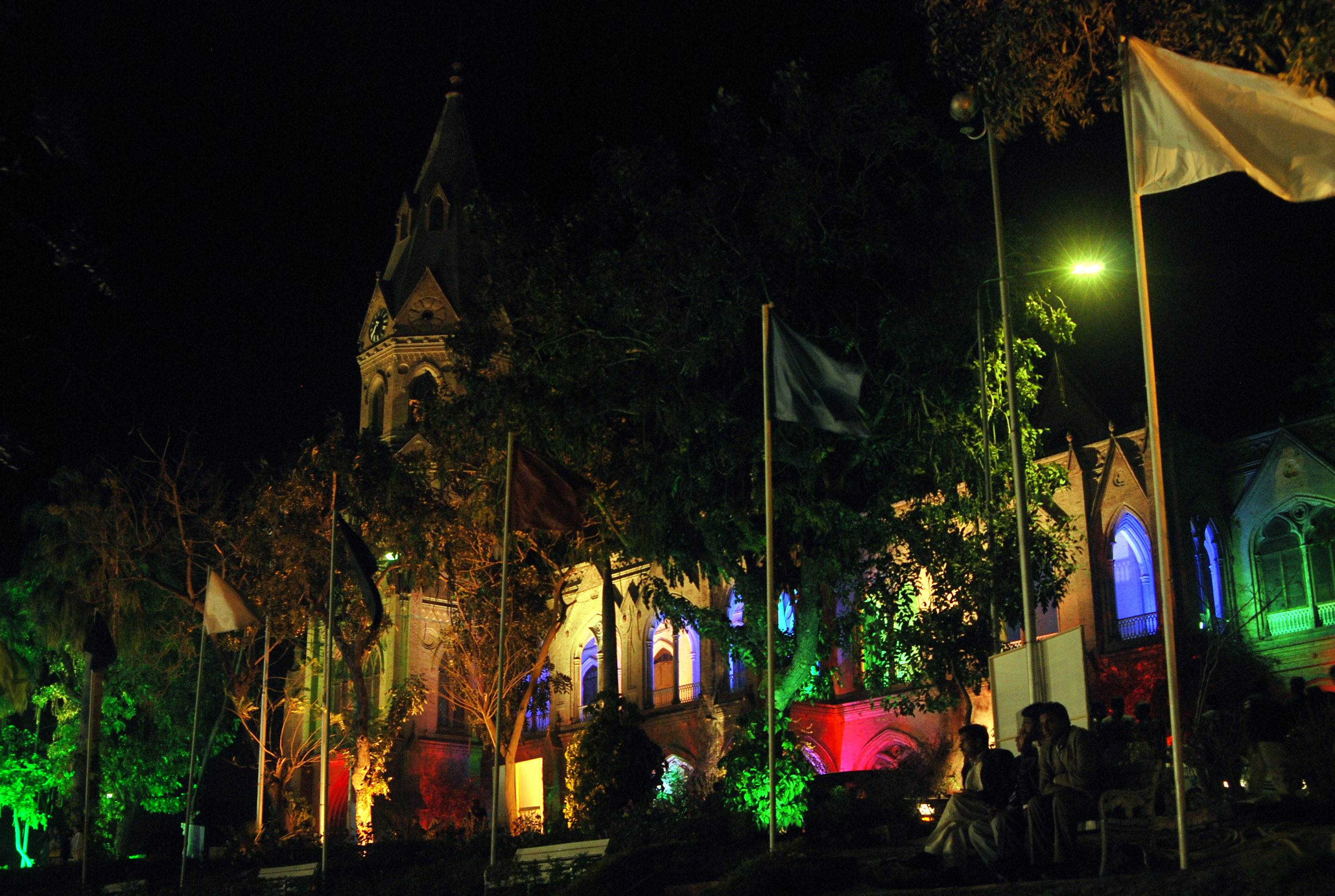
Annual Dinner at GC

The torch, as the crest of the university emblem, represents the light of knowledge. The motto "Courage to Know" represents the guiding principle of the student community.

== Academics ==
=== Programs ===
The college offers degrees in Higher Secondary School Certificate (locally referred to as Intermediate), undergraduate and post-graduate studies. In the higher education level, it offers 28 bachelor's degrees, 28 MS/MPhil Degrees and 19 PhD degrees. These degrees are offered under the following faculties:

- Faculty of Chemistry and Life Sciences
- Faculty of Mathematical & Physical Sciences
- Faculty of Arts & Social Sciences
- Faculty of Language, Islamic & Oriental Learning
- Faculty of Engineering

=== Research ===
The college has always been a research-led institution, however, in recent times, it has shifted its focus towards quality output projects, which it believes to be beneficial academically and industrially. Office of Research, Innovation and Commercialization (ORIC) has been set up to manage all research issues. The objective of the office is to advance, diversify and manage all research programs and to uphold international standards of research.

It receives research grants mostly from foreign universities like Strathclyde University, Cranfield University, World Bank Researchers Alliance for Development and British Council and from national institutes and organizations like Pakistan Atomic Energy Commission (PAEC), Pakistan Science Foundation (PSF), Khan Research Laboratories (KRL), PTCL, Higher Education Commission and Ministry of Science and Technology.

=== Institutes ===
The college has five autonomous/semi-autonomous, research-oriented institutes, focused on academic and industrial research and development projects. These institutes are:

- Abdus Salam School of Mathematical Sciences (ASSMS) – study of scientific and technological problems by mathematical methods in mathematical sciences.
- Center for Advanced Studies in Physics (CASP) – research and development (R&D) in Experimental Physics.
- Institute of Industrial Biotechnology (IIB) – offers degrees in Biotechnology and Microbiology.
- Sustainable Development Study Center (SDSC) – R&D in Environmental science.
- Center of Excellence of China Studies (CECS) – offers diplomas in Chinese language and China studies.

== Abdus Salam School for Mathematical Sciences ==
The Abdus Salam School of Mathematical Sciences (ASSMS) is one of the largest mathematical research institutes in Pakistan. The school was established in 2003 by Government of Punjab.

In 2011, it was labeled as the first "Emerging Regional Center of Excellence" by the European Mathematical Society (EMS) for the period 2011 to 2015.

It has taken steps to provide encouragement to Pakistani students in schools and colleges. These include:

- Hiring Foreign Faculty to teach or supervise ASSMS students in advanced level mathematics. This step was initiated by the founding director general of ASSMS, A.D.R. Choudary. Jürgen Herzog, Josip Pečarić, Amer Iqbal, Alexandru Dimca, and Hannah Markwig are among Foreign Faculty that have supervised/co-supervised Ph.D. students at ASSMS.
- Hosted international conferences and workshops in mathematics. The most important conferences of AS-SMS were “World Conferences of Mathematics in the 21st Century” series, held during the tenure of A.D.R. Choudary. Some notable mathematicians that have visited and given talks in this conference series are Ari Laptev (president of the EMS 2007–2010), Marta Sanz-Solé (president of the EMS 2011–2014), Pierre Cartier (an associate of the Bourbaki Group), Arnfinn Laudal, Michel Waldschmidt, János Pach, Alan Huckleberry, Aline Bonami, and Ragni Piene (Chair of the Abel Prize Committee 2010-2014 and the first-ever woman in the International Mathematical Union Executive Committee).
- Up until 2014, during the tenure of A.D.R. Choudary, the faculty at the Abdus Salam School of Mathematical Sciences hosted training camps for students from schools and colleges. The participants of the camps are prepared for the national team of Pakistan to compete at the International Mathematical Olympiad (IMO). In 2005, the national team of Pakistan took part for the first time in IMO. Trained in ASSMS, the Pakistan team won its first medal at IMO in 2007 and its first silver medal in 2012.
- ASSMS initiated the Mathematical Kangaroo contests at the national level.

== Chairs ==
=== Abdus Salam Chair in Physics ===
The Abdus Salam Chair in Physics, named after the Pakistani theoretical physicist and Nobel laureate Abdus Salam is an honorary chair in physics at the university. Starting out as a semi-autonomous institute, it became operational in March 2000 with the efforts of Ishfaq Ahmad, a lifelong friend of Salam. In 2009, the International Center for Theoretical Physics (ICTP) donated Salam's original Nobel certificate to the Salam Chair in Physics. The former director of ICTP, Katepalli R. Sreenivasan, visited Lahore where he gifted the original Nobel certificate to the university's alma mater. The certificate reads: "for their contributions to the theory of the unified weak and electromagnetic interaction between elementary particles, including, inter-alia, the prediction of the weak neutral current".

It has been integrated into Department of Physics, where MPhil and PhD students carry out their research work. Some of its achievements include: getting 52 research publications in international journals; producing six PhD and 25 MPhil theses; setting up a Plasma Technology Lab; and contracting research grants from funding agencies and research centers such as the International Center for Theoretical Physics (ICTP), Pakistan Atomic Energy Commission (PAEC), Kahuta Research Laboratories (KRL), Pakistan Science Foundation (PSF) and Pakistan Council of Scientific and Industrial Research (PCSIR).

=== Rafi Muhammad Chaudhry Chair in Experimental Physics ===
The Rafi Muhammad Chaudhry Chair in Experimental Physics was named after Rafi Muhammad Chaudhry, a renowned Pakistani nuclear physicist and a professor of particle physics at the university. He is widely regarded as having been the pioneer of experimental nuclear physics research in Pakistan. During his tenure as a professor at the college, he set up High Tension Laboratory there in 1952 (now amalgamated into Center for Advanced Studies in Physics CASP) where research anent to gaseous discharges, ion, and electron impact phenomena, nuclear physics, radioactivity, and cosmic rays is carried out. The chair was set up in recognition of his services to Pakistan and to Physics. Currently, post-graduate research work in Applied Physics is carried out here.

=== Mahboob-ul-Haq Chair in Economics ===
The Mahboob-ul-Haq Chair in Economics is the latest addition to honorary chairs, named after Mahbub ul Haq, a Pakistani economist, politician and international development theorist who served as the 13th Finance Minister of Pakistan. While serving as the Special Advisor to the United Nations Development Program (UNDP), he led the establishment of the Human Development Report (HDI) and the widely respected Human Development Index (HDI). The Economist called him "one of the visionaries of international development."

It established the chair to recognize his services to Pakistan, its people, and above all to the discipline of Economics. Apart from post-graduate research in Economics, the chair is also in charge of publishing GC Economics Journal an annual scholarly and peer-audited publication. Its intent is to act as a platform for researchers, professionals, and students to share their achievements, perspectives, and practical experiences.

== Accommodation ==
The college has four hostels – three for boys and one for girls. Iqbal Hostel (built in 1891) and Quaid-e-Azam Hostel (built in 1993) accommodate about 150 and 200 Intermediate students, respectively. The New Hostel (built in 1937) houses about 400 Degree students. Girls Hostel (built in 1975) accommodates about 50 girl students. A Faculty Mess has been built for visiting family members, faculty and officers of the other universities. Lodging and messing facilities are available here.

== Notable alumni ==
Alumni of the institute are called Ravians, which is a derived word from the name of the student magazine "Ravi", published by the administration of the college; the magazine name itself is inspired by the Ravi River that passes through Lahore.

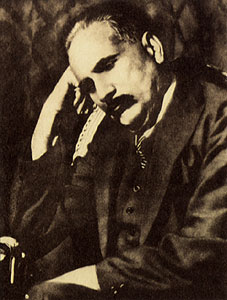
Sir Muhammad Iqbal – the national poet of Pakistan and important figure in Urdu literature.

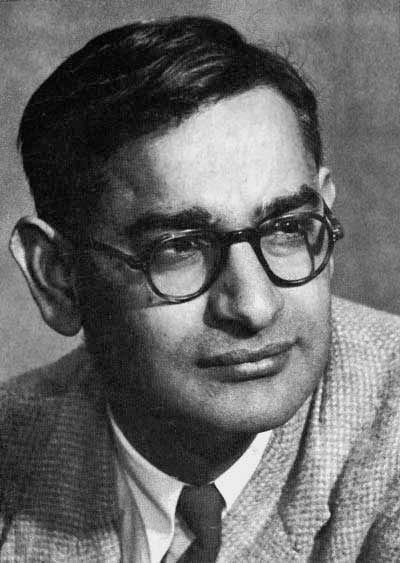
Dr. Har Gobind Khorana – won the 1968 Nobel Prize in Medicine.

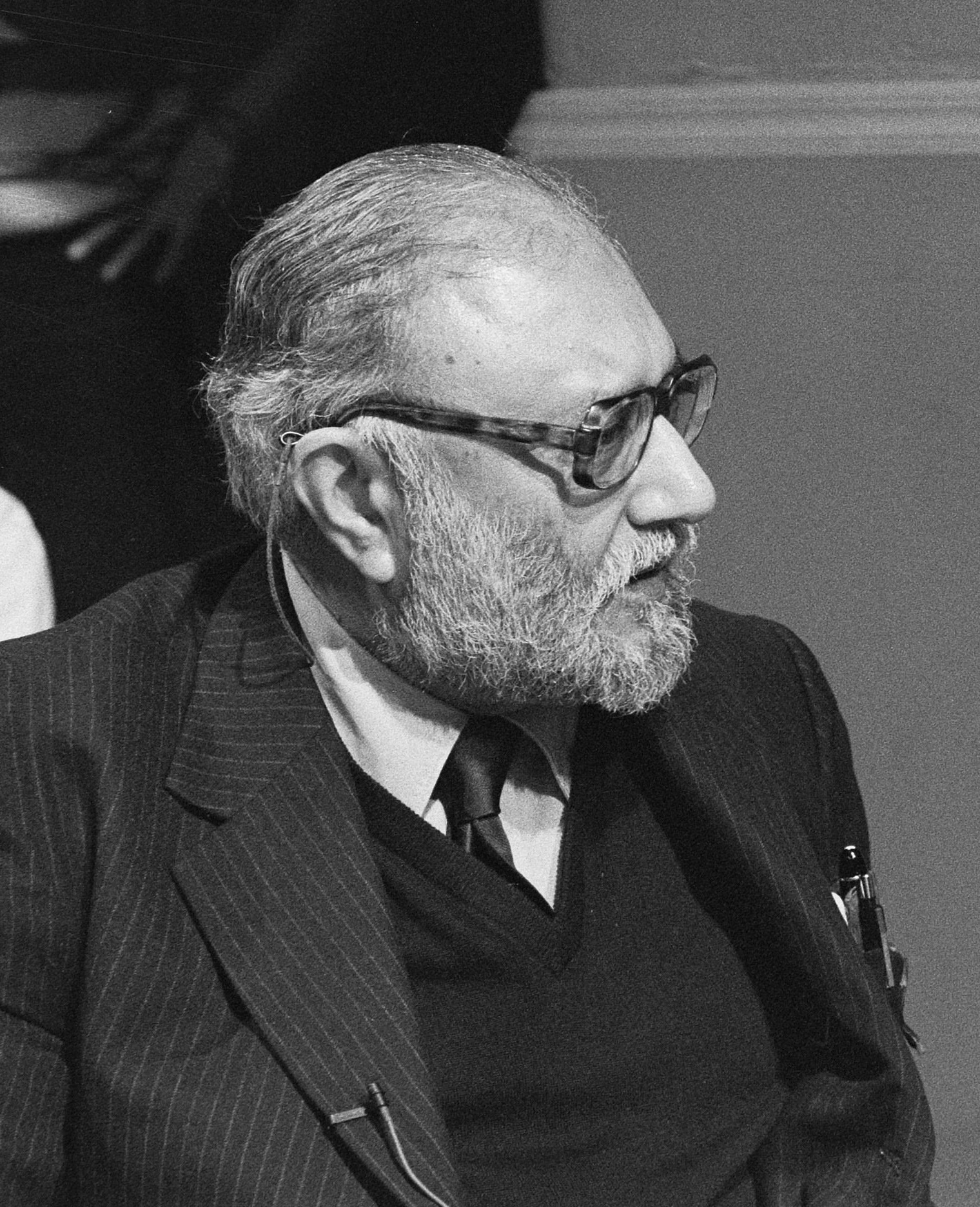
Dr. Abdus Salam – won the 1979 Nobel prize in Physics.

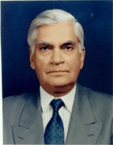
Ishfaq Ahmad – Pakistani nuclear physicist, who served at CERN and the International Atomic Energy Agency.

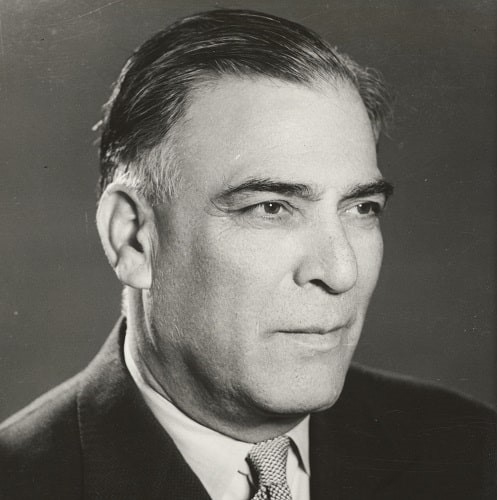
Wajid Ali Khan Burki – Pakistani ophthalmologist and Army Medical Corps general

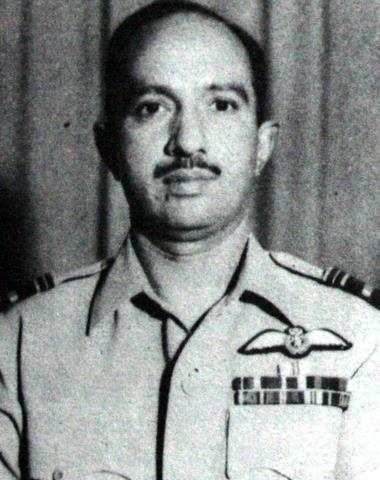
Mohammad Akhtar – Pakistani Air Vice Marshal and Deputy Chief of Air Staff (1964-1966)

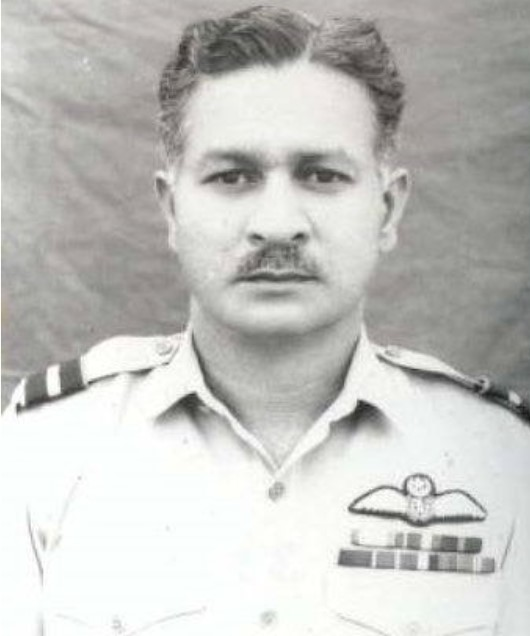
Saeedullah Khan Pakistani Air Vice Marshal and Deputy Chief of Air Staff (1972-1973)

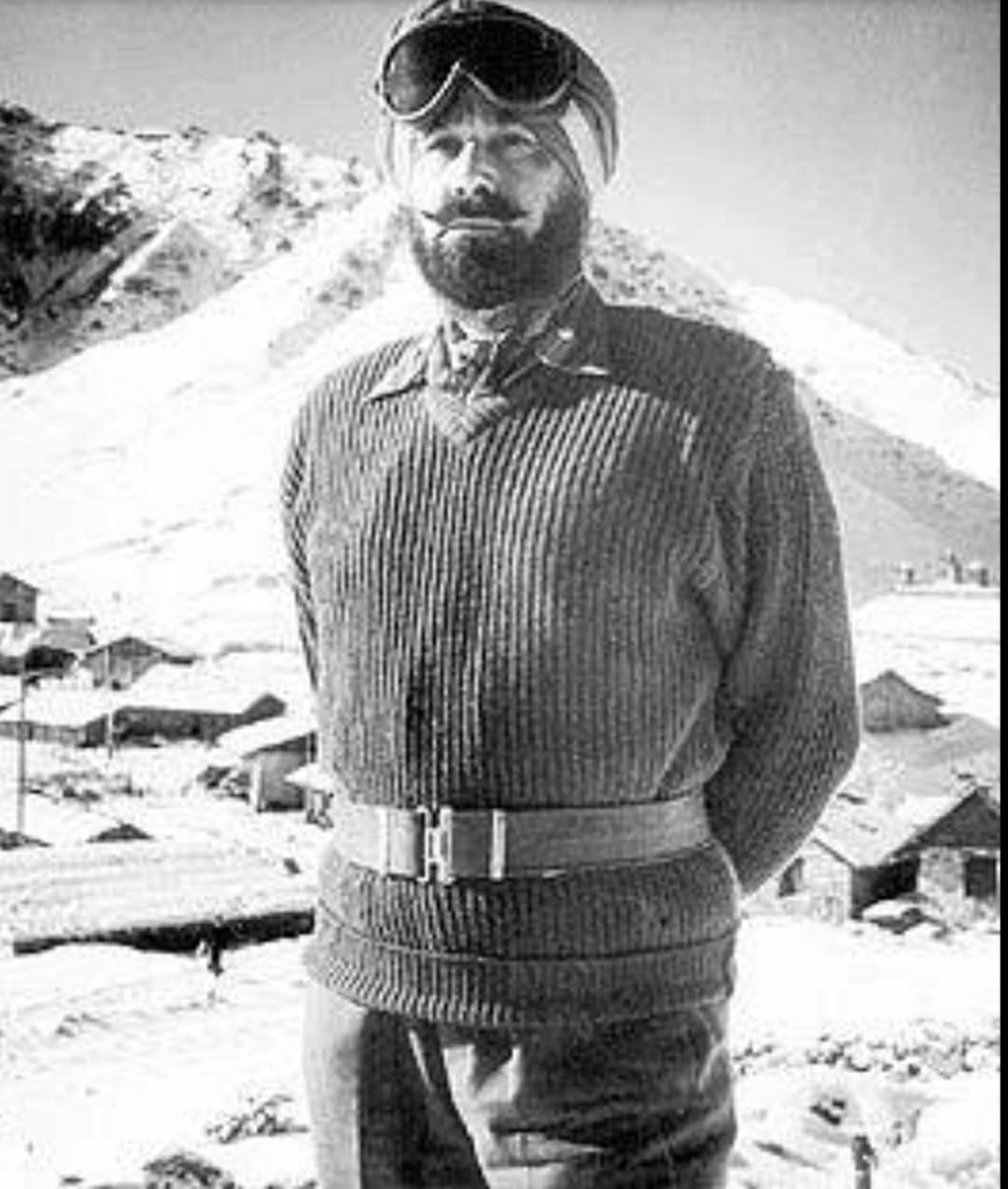
Harbaksh Singh – Indian Lieutenant General and former GOC-in-C of Western Command, India (1965-1969)

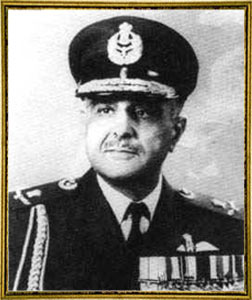
Om Prakash Mehra Indian Air Chief Marshal and 8th Chief of the Air Staff (India) (1973-1976)

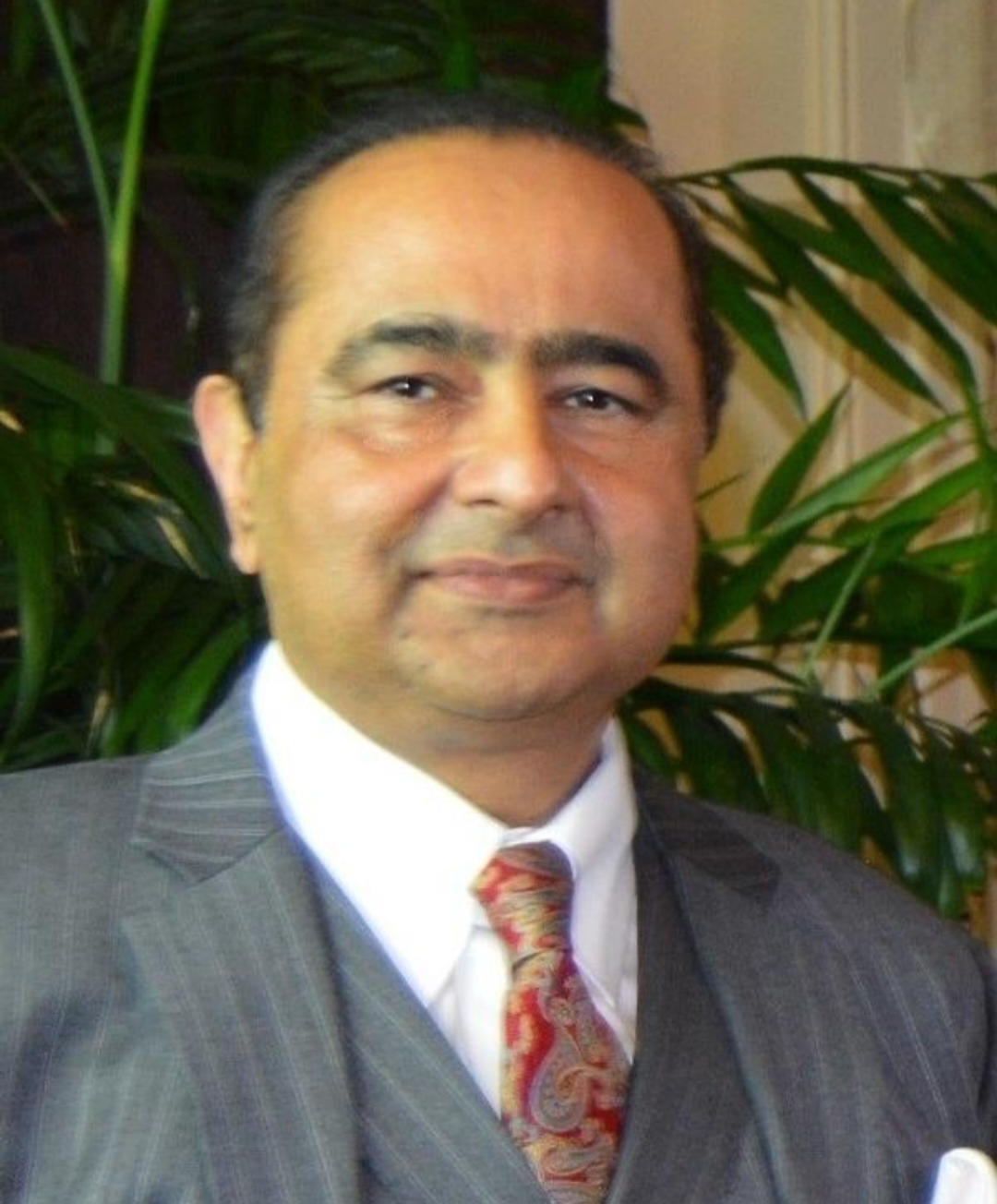
Dr. Ishfaq Ahmad - Famous computer scientist and author
- Nawaz Sharif – former three-time 12th, 14th, and 20th Prime Minister of Pakistan.
- Zafarullah Khan Jamali – 15th Prime Minister of Pakistan.
- Yousaf Raza Gillani – 18th Prime Minister of Pakistan.
- Shehbaz Sharif - 23rd Prime Minister of Pakistan.
- Syed Ahmed Shah Patras Bokhari – humorist, author, broadcaster and diplomat who served as the First Permanent Representative of Pakistan to the United Nations.
- Mohsin Naqvi - Senator, 40th Minister of Interior, 37th Chairman of Pakistan Cricket Board and 30th President of Asian Cricket Council.
- Moeenuddin Ahmad Qureshi – former caretaker prime minister of Pakistan and former senior vice president of the World Bank.
- Madan Lal Dhingra (1883–1909), Indian revolutionary, pro-independence activist, who, while studying in England, assassinated a British colonial officer William Hutt Curzon Wyllie. Dhingra was hanged at HM Prison Pentonville, denied Hindu rites and buried by the British authorities. Winston Churchill privately acknowledged Dhingra's statement "[t]he Finest ever made in the name of Patriotism".
- Jahangir Khan – 6-time squash world champion, who is widely regarded as the greatest squash player of all time.
- Lieutenant General Agha Ibrahim Akram – Historian and author
- Farooq Umar – Air Vice Marshal, airline executive, and 16th President of Pakistan Hockey Federation.
- Munir Ahmad Khan – former chairman of the Pakistan Atomic Energy Commission (PAEC).
- Dev Anand (born Dharamdev Pishorimal Anand; 26 September 1923 – 3 December 2011), Indian film superstar, writer, director and producer known for his work in Hindi cinema, through a career that spanned over six decades. He was one of the most successful and celebrated actors in the Indian film history.
- Faiz Ahmad Faiz – one of the most celebrated poets of the Urdu language in Pakistan and India.
- Raheel Sharif – former chief of Army Staff of Pakistan.
- Prem Chandra Dhanda – Indian physician.
- Asif Saeed Khan Khosa – Pakistani jurist who served as the 26th chief justice of Pakistan from 18 January 2019 to 20 December 2019.
- Hamid Gul – former director-general of the Inter-Services Intelligence (ISI), Pakistan's premier intelligence agency, between 1987 and 1989.
- Tariq Jamil – Pakistani Islamic television preacher, religious writer, scholar, and a member of the Tablighi Jamaat.
- Ashfaq Ahmed – Pakistani intellectual, playwright, and broadcaster, awarded the President's Pride of Performance and Sitara-i-Imtiaz for his services in the field of literature.
- Bilal U. Haq – naturalist, geoscientist and poet, France's Prestwich Prize laureate in geology, inducted in the European Academy of Science and Letters. Recipient of the International Distinguished Career Award from the Geological Society of America, the Ocean Sciences Award from the American Geophysical Union, the Francis Shepard Medal in Marine Geology, the Antarctic Medal from the US National Science Foundation, and honoured by his peers by the naming of a fossil genus and species after him.
- Senior Justice Javed Iqbal – son of Dr Muhammad Iqbal; had a prolific career in the judiciary of Pakistan
- Amjad Siddique – Pakistani former first-class cricketer who played for Water and Power Development Authority cricket team (WAPDA cricket team), including some time as captain
- Rameez Raja – Pakistani former cricketer, commentator and a former chairman of the Pakistan Cricket Board.
- Iqrar Ul Hassan – TV presenter and investigative reporter of ARY News. He hosts a famous program "Sar-e-Aam".
- Ismat Beg (PhD, Bucharest) – mathematician, known for his work on Multiple-criteria decision analysis and fixed point (mathematics)
- Hadiqa Kiani – Pakistani singer.
- Aftab Iqbal – TV anchor and journalist.
- Javed Ahmad Ghamidi – Pakistani Muslim theologian, Quran scholar, Islamic modernist, exegete and educationist.
- Rehan Butt – former international field hockey player and captain of Pakistan team who represented Pakistan from 2002 to 2012.
- Bilal Zafar – Pakistan army officer
- Farid Ahmad Khan - Pakistani doctor and plastic surgeon who served as chairman and dean of Shaikh Zayed Medical Complex from 2015 to 2018, and Registrar of King Edward Medical University from 2011 to 2015.
- Amjad Saqib - He promotes self-reliance and community support, earning global recognition, including the Ramon Magsaysay Award in 2021.
- Yahya Afridi - 30th Chief Justice of Pakistan.
- S. D. Narang - Indian filmmaker, actor and author.

== In popular culture ==
"The Last Follower and The Resurrection of Voldemort" is Pakistan's Ramon Magsaysay Award movie, filmed at the college, which served as Hogwarts in the film. The film is produced by a group of young Ravians which laid the foundation of the annual Harry Potter Festival at GC.

== See also ==
- List of Ravians
