= Boston University Pardee School of Global Studies =

Public policy school of Boston University

Frederick S. Pardee School of Global Studies
- Other name: Pardee School
- Type: Private
- Established: 2014
- Founder: Frederick S. Pardee
- Parent institution: Boston University
- Affiliations: APSIA
- Dean: Scott Taylor
- Faculty: 50
- Administrative staff: 25
- Students: 1,000
- Location: 121 Bay State Road, Boston, Massachusetts, United States; 42.3504°N 71.0989°W
- Campus: Urban
- Language: English
- Founding Dean: Adil Najam
- Colors: Aquamarine
- Website: bu.edu/pardeeschool

The Boston University Pardee School of Global Studies (formally Frederick S. Pardee School of Global Studies) is the school of international studies at Boston University.

The school was officially established in 2014 by consolidating and renaming a number of long-established programs in international and regional studies at Boston University dating back to 1953. The current dean of the Pardee School is Scott D. Taylor, an American scholar of African politics and political economy, with a particular focus on business-state relations, private sector development, governance, and political and economic reform. The Pardee School has nearly 1,000 students, including about 800 undergraduate students. It offers six graduate degrees, two graduate certificates, five undergraduate majors, and seven undergraduate minors, and also brings together seven centers and programs of regional and thematic studies.

== History ==
The Pardee School was established based on Boston University's long-standing commitment to global education and was made possible by a $25 million gift by Boston University alumnus Frederick S. Pardee. Prof. Adil Najam, a global development and sustainable development expert and former vice chancellor of the Lahore University of Management Sciences, Pakistan, was named the inaugural dean of the Pardee School. At the conclusion of the 2021–2022 academic year, Prof. Najam stepped down as Dean. On August 31, 2022, Scott Taylor, a former Professor and Vice Dean for Diversity, Equity, and Inclusion at the Georgetown University School of Foreign Service, was appointed Dean of the Pardee School.

The Pardee School employs nearly 40 full-time tenured or tenure-track faculty and Professors of the Practice as well as a variety of adjunct and visiting professors. Through its Centers and Programs, it has an affiliate faculty across Boston University of nearly 200. It offers 9 graduate degrees, 2 graduate certificates, 5 undergraduate majors, 8 undergraduate minors, and also brings together 7 centers and programs of regional and thematic studies.

The Pardee School describes itself as a school established in and for the 21st century and embraces higher education innovations; for example, in launching its first MOOC in its first year (by Prof. Andrew Bacevich on 'War for the Greater Middle East').

== Degree programs ==
The Pardee School educates undergraduate and graduate students in global affairs and international relations. The Pardee School offers six MA programs with eight functional specializations, three dual-degree programs, one regional degree and two graduate certificates. It also offers five undergraduate majors and seven undergraduate minors.

=== Undergraduate programs ===
The Pardee School offers five Bachelor of Arts degrees:

- BA in International Relations
- BA in Asian Studies
- BA in European Studies
- BA in Latin America Studies
- BA in Middle East and North Africa Studies

The Pardee School of Global Studies also Boston University students the opportunity to complete the following seven minors: International relations, African languages and literature, African studies, Asian studies, European studies, Latin American studies, and Muslim cultures and societies.

=== Graduate programs ===
The Pardee School trains graduate students in global affairs and international relations. The school provides significant financial assistance to graduate students for tuition as well as international travel for research. Most degrees require foreign language proficiency and a field internship.

- MA in International Affairs (two-year program). With specializations in (i) Diplomacy, (ii) Global Economic Affairs, (iii) Security Studies, (iv) Religion and International Affairs, and (v) International Communication.
- MA in Global Policy (1.5-year program). With Specializations in (i) Environmental Policy, (ii) Development Policy, and (iii) International Public Health Policy.
- MA in International Relations (one-year accelerated program)
- MA in Latin American Studies

=== Dual-degree programs ===
The Pardee School provides its students many opportunities for taking courses across all schools and colleges at Boston University. Four of its graduate degrees are offered in collaboration with other Schools and Colleges. These include two joint degrees listed above (MA in Global Development Policy and MA in International Relations and Communication). In addition the Pardee School also offers its graduate students the option for three Dual Degrees.

- MA in International Relations and Juris Doctor (IRJD)
- MA in International Relations and Master of Business Administration (IRMBA)
- BA/MA in International Affairs (MAIA)

=== Graduate certificate programs ===
The Pardee School also offers three graduate certificate programs that are offered to all graduate students at Boston University.

- Graduate Certificate in African Studies
- Graduate Certificate in Asian Studies
- Graduate Certificate in Latin American Studies
- Graduate Certificate in Muslim Studies
- Graduate Certificate in European Studies

== Programs, centers and institutes ==
- African Studies Center
- Center for the Study of Asia
- Center for the Study of Europe
- Global Development Policy Center
- Center of Latin America Studies
- Pardee Center for the Study of the Longer-Range Future
- Institute on Culture, Religion and World Affairs

== Notable faculty ==
- Andrew Bacevich, Professor Emeritus of International Relations and History
- Peter L. Berger, Professor Emeritus of Sociology, Religion and Theology, Founder of CURA
- Houchang Chehabi, Professor Emeritus of International Relations and History
- David Fromkin, Professor Emeritus of History and International Relations, former Director of The Frederick S. Pardee Center for the Study of the Long-Range Future
- Jorge Heine, Research Professor; Interim Director, Frederick S. Pardee Center for the Study of the Longer-Range Future
- Timothy Longman, Associate Dean for Academic Affairs; Professor of International Relations and Political Science; Director of the Institute on Culture, Religion, and World Affairs (CURA)
- Perry Mehrling, Professor of Economics
- Adil Najam, Dean Emerıtus and Professor of International Relations and Earth and Environment
- Augustus Richard Norton, Professor Emeritus of International Relations and Anthropology
- Vivien A. Schmidt, Jean Monnet Professor of European Integration Professor of International Relations and Political Science
- Quinn Slobodian, Professor of International History
- Jessica Stern, Research Professor of International Relations

== Notable alumni ==
- Alexandria Ocasio-Cortez, U.S. Representative for New York's 14th congressional district, elected on November 6, 2018.
- Andy Vargas, State Representative who represents the 3rd Essex District in the Massachusetts House of Representatives.
- Shoshana Chatfield, United States Navy rear admiral, and served as the president of the Naval War College from 2019 to 2023.
- David Young (diplomat), American diplomat who is the United States Ambassador to Malawi.
- Moeed Yusuf, Pakistani national security scholar who served as the 9th National Security Adviser to the Prime Minister of Pakistan.
- Daniella Kolodny, first female rabbi enlisted in the United States Naval Academy.
- Christopher Paul O'Neill, British-American financier and husband of Princess Madeleine, Duchess of Hälsingland and Gästrikland.
- Adam Lupel, Vice President and Chief Executive Officer at the International Peace Institute (IPI) in New York.
