= Jawad Syed =

Pakistani management scholar

Jawad Syed (جواد سید) is a Pakistani academic whose work concerns organisational behaviour, diversity management and international human resource management. He is Professor of Leadership and Organisational Behaviour at the Lahore University of Management Sciences (LUMS), where he has also served as dean of the Suleman Dawood School of Business.

Syed previously held academic positions at the University of Kent and the University of Huddersfield. In 2011, he received the Sitara-i-Imtiaz for his contributions and public service in equality and diversity management.

== Education ==
Syed received a Master of International Business from Western Sydney University in 2001. He completed a PhD in business at Macquarie University in 2008 and a Postgraduate Certificate in Higher Education at the University of Kent in the same year.

== Career ==
Syed worked at the University of Kent as a reader from 2007 to 2014. From 2014 to 2016, he was a professor at the University of Huddersfield.

In 2016, he joined the Suleman Dawood School of Business at LUMS as Professor of Leadership and Organisational Behaviour. He subsequently served as dean of the school.

== Research ==
Syed's research and teaching interests include diversity management, human resource management, leadership, strategy and business ethics. His publications have appeared in journals including Human Relations, the British Journal of Management, the Human Resource Management Journal, Business Ethics Quarterly, the Journal of Business Ethics, Gender, Work & Organization, Management Learning and the Journal of Knowledge Management.

In a 2009 article co-authored with Mustafa F. Özbilgin, Syed proposed a relational framework for examining the transfer of diversity-management practices across national and organisational contexts.

His views on intersectionality and overlapping identities in employment were discussed in the Financial Times in 2016.

== Honours ==
Syed was awarded the Sitara-i-Imtiaz by the President of Pakistan on 14 August 2011 for contributions and public service in equality and diversity management.

== Selected works ==
Selected books authored or edited by Syed include:

- Syed, Jawad; Özbilgin, Mustafa F. (2010). Managing Cultural Diversity in Asia: A Research Companion. Edward Elgar Publishing. ISBN 978-1-84980-094-5.
- Özbilgin, Mustafa F.; Syed, Jawad (2010). Managing Gender Diversity in Asia: A Research Companion. Edward Elgar Publishing. ISBN 978-1-84720-644-2.
- Kramar, Robin; Syed, Jawad (2012). Human Resource Management in a Global Context: A Critical Approach. Palgrave Macmillan. ISBN 978-0-230-25153-3.
- Syed, Jawad; Kramar, Robin (2017). Human Resource Management: A Global and Critical Perspective (2nd ed.). Palgrave Macmillan. ISBN 978-1-137-52162-0.
- Syed, Jawad; Klarsfeld, Alain; Ngunjiri, Faith Wambura; Härtel, Charmine E. J. (2018). Religious Diversity in the Workplace. Cambridge University Press. ISBN 978-1-316-50173-3.
- Syed, Jawad; Liu, Yipeng (2019). China's Belt and Road Initiative in a Global Context. Palgrave Macmillan.
- Syed, Jawad; Özbilgin, Mustafa F. (2020). Managing Diversity and Inclusion: An International Perspective (2nd ed.). SAGE Publications. ISBN 978-1-5264-5888-9.
