= Frederick Pardee =

Frederick Pardee may refer to:

- Frederick Forsyth Pardee (1866–1927), Ontario barrister and political figure
- Frederick S. Pardee (born 1932), American economist, real estate investor and philanthropist
