= Adil Najam =

Pakistani climate change scholar (born 1965)

- عادل نجم
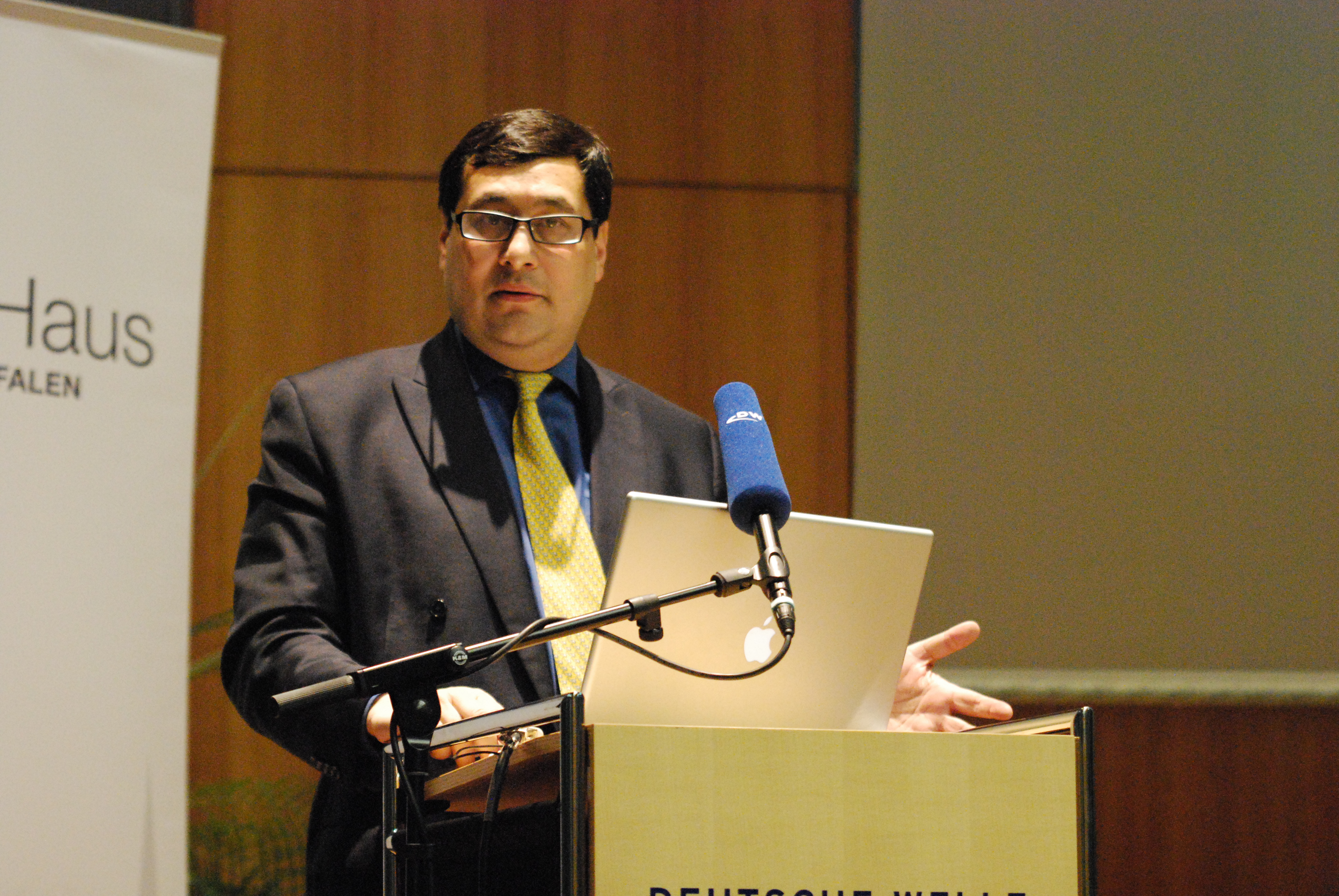

11th President of WWF
- Incumbent
- Assumed office 2023
- Preceded by: Neville Isdell

1st (Founding) Dean of Pardee School, Boston University
- In office 2014–2022
- Succeeded by: Scott Taylor

3rd Vice Chancellor of Lahore University of Management Sciences (LUMS)
- In office 2011–2014
- Preceded by: Ahmad Durrani
- Succeeded by: Sohail H. Naqvi

Personal details
- Born: Rawalpindi, Punjab, Pakistan
- Education: University of Engineering and Technology, Lahore, Pakistan; Massachusetts Institute of Technology (MIT), U.S.
- Known for: HigherEd Leadership; Environmental Leadership
- Awards: Sitara-i-Imtiaz, 2008; Hilal-i-Imtiaz, 2023
- Scientific career
- Fields: International Relations; Climate Change; Environmental Policy; Development Policy; South Asia Politics
- Workplaces: MIT; Pardee School, Boston University; Tufts University; LUMS; IPCC
- Doctoral advisor: Larry Susskind

Adil Najam (Urdu: عادل نجم) is a Pakistani academic who also serves as the global President of WWF, the Worldwide Fund for Nature (starting July 2023), and is Dean Emeritus and Professor of International Relations and Earth and Environment at the Pardee School of Global Studies at Boston University. He was the founding Dean of the Pardee School from its creation in 2014 until 2022, when he was awarded the status of Dean Emeritus by Boston University. Previously he had served as vice-chancellor of the LUMS in Lahore, Pakistan.

== Life ==
Since 2023, Adil Najam serves as the global President of WWF International. In 2022, Adil Najam stepped down after eight years as the founding Dean of the Boston University Frederick S. Pardee School of Global Studies. In recognition of his services the University conferred on his the status of Dean Emeritus and also established the "Adil Najam Prize and Fellowship for Advancing the Public Understanding of Global Affairs".

In 2011, Najam returned to Pakistan to head the Lahore University of Management Sciences (LUMS) as its third vice-chancellor. During his tenure at LUMS, he oversaw the launch of a major student financial aid program and brought in major philanthropic gifts to enable an expansion of the university. However, he faced criticism for not intervening over the controversial termination of Pervez Hoodbhoy by the university's School of Science and Engineering. Najam left LUMS in June 2013, and returned to Boston University. A year later he was appointed the inaugural dean of Pardee School.

In 2008, the President of Pakistan conferred on him the award of the Sitara-i-Imtiaz, and in 2023, he was awarded the Hilal-i-Imtiaz by the Government of Pakistan. In February 2009, he was appointed to the Committee for Development Policy by the United Nations Secretary General. He is a senior fellow of the International Institute for Sustainable Development. He has also served as the Chair of the Boards of the South Asian Network for Development and Environmental Economics (SANDEE), of LEAD-Pakistan, and of the Luc Hoffmann Institute. He also serves as a trustee on the international board of the World Wide Fund for Nature and on the board of The Asia Foundation. Adil Najam was awarded an honorary doctorate degree by the Information Technology University (ITU) in Lahore, Pakistan, in 2017, for his contributions in science, climate change, and sustainable development.

== Publications ==
=== Scholarly work ===
Adil Najam promotes the idea of living in the "Age of Adaptation" and conceptualizing water as being as important to climate adaptation as carbon was to mitigation.

"Water is to adaptation what carbon is to mitigation."

— Prof. Adil Najamr

Najam served as a lead author for the third and fourth assessment reports of the Intergovernmental Panel on Climate Change (IPCC). The IPCC was awarded the 2007 Nobel Peace Prize for its contributions to advancing the understanding of global climate change.

His books include How Immigrants Impact their Homelands (co-editor, 2013), "The Future of South-South Economic Relations" (co-editor, 2012), "Envisioning a Sustainable Development Agenda for Trade and Environment" (co-editor, 2007), "Portrait of a Giving Community" (2007), "Environment, Development and Human Security" (editor, 2003), and "Civic Entrepreneurship" (co-author, 2002).

He was the lead author for the 2018 Pakistan National Human Development Report, which focused on the topic of youth and included a first comprehensive district-by-district ranking in a national Human Development Index for Pakistan. The report and the district HDI index became a matter of much election campaign discussion during the 2018 Pakistani general election.

=== Media ===
Early in his career, Najam worked as a journalist (sports reporter and columnist) for various newspapers and magazines in Pakistan. He has contributed to newspapers in Pakistan and in the international press. In 2007, Najam launched the blog "All Things Pakistan (Pakistaniat)" which won the Brass Crescent Award for the best South Asian blog in 2010 and was judged the best current affairs blog by the Pakistan Blog Awards 2010.

== Awards and recognition ==
Year	Title	Presented by	Ref.
2023	Crescent of Excellence	President of Pakistan	
2004	Paddock Teaching Prize	Fletcher School, Tufts University	
2008	Star of Excellence	President of Pakistan	
1997	Goodwin Medal	MIT	
