= Economy of Lahore =

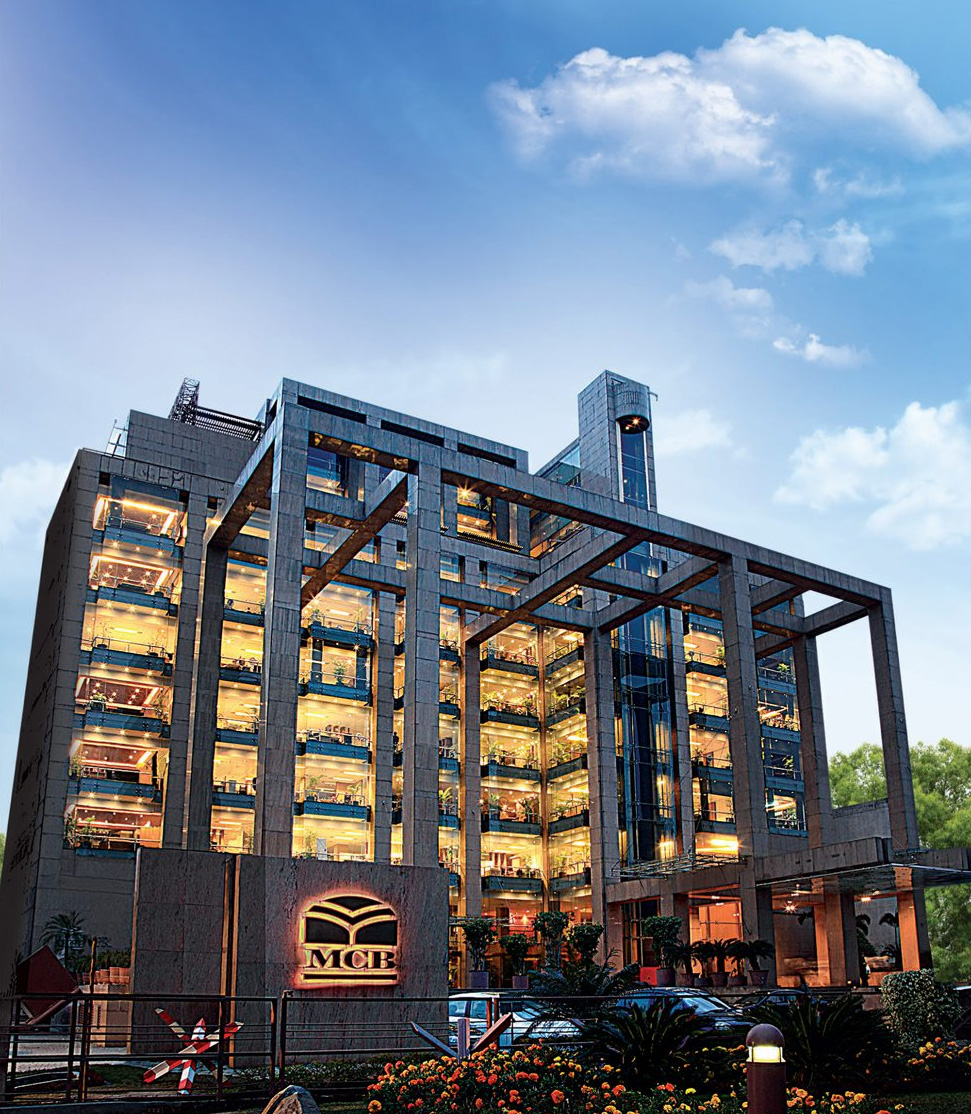
Muslim Commercial Bank headquarters in Lahore

The economy of Lahore has a diversified base spanning from telecommunication, information technology, manufacturing industry, engineering, pharmaceuticals, steel, chemicals and construction material.

== Gross domestic product ==
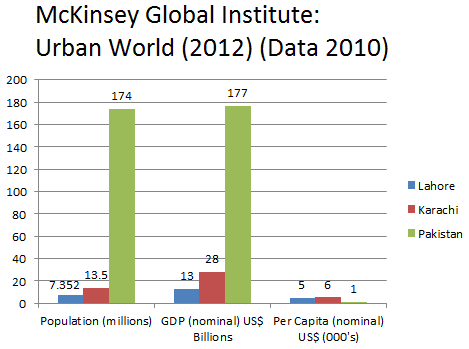
Pakistan and its two largest city economies. Source:

As of 2019, Lahore had an estimated GDP (PPP) of $84 billion. As of 2008, the city's gross domestic product (GDP) by purchasing power parity (PPP) was estimated at $40 billion (projected to be $102 billion by the year 2025, with a slightly higher growth rate of 5.6% per annum, as compared to Karachi's 5.5%). The contribution of Lahore to the national economy is estimated to be 11.5% and 19% to the provincial economy of Punjab. As a whole Punjab has $115 billion economy making it first and to date only Pakistani Subdivision of economy more than $100 billion at the rank 144.

== Industries ==
Lahore is the second largest financial hub of Pakistan and has industrial areas including Kot Lakhpat and the new Sundar Industrial Estate (near Raiwand). A major industrial agglomeration with about 9,000 industrial units, Lahore has shifted in recent decades from manufacturing to service industries. Some 42% of its work force is employed in finance, banking, real estate, community, cultural, and social services. The city is the country’s largest software producing center, and hosts a growing computer-assembly industry.

=== Small-scale industries ===
Lahore is the hub of handmade carpet manufacturing in Pakistan. At present, hand-knitted carpets produced in and around Lahore are among Pakistan's leading export products, and their manufacturing is the second-largest cottage and small industry. Craftsmen in Lahore produce almost every type of handmade carpet using popular motifs such as medallions, paisleys, traceries, and geometric designs. The Lahore Design Centre at the Punjab Small Industries Corporation maintains a separate section of carpet designing to experiment with new designs. Lahore is known for single-weft designs in Turkoman and Caucasian style and double-weft Mughal types.

=== Projects ===
Among the projects currently under construction in Lahore is the long-delayed Lahore Expo Centre.

Defense Raya Golf Resort is an exceptional housing project that spans 400 acres of premium residential and commercial development. The vibrant community is built around the 18-hole international-standard Defence Raya Golf Course and features a wide range of real estate offerings, including luxury apartments, posh villas and ultramodern commercial centres. The project is a joint venture between DHA Lahore and BRDB Malaysia. The rapid development of large projects such as these in the city is expected to boost the economy of the country.

== See also ==
- Economy of Pakistan
- Lahore School of Economics
