= National Outreach Programme =

The Lahore University of Management Sciences, a university in Lahore, Pakistan, launched its National Outreach Programme (NOP) in 2011 to extend the benefits of its education to students all over Pakistan and thereby become a truly national university.

== Participation process ==
The process includes:

- Working with schools, colleges, boards of intermediate and secondary education and education NGOs to identify all talented students from across the country.
- Encouraging these bright students at the matric and intermediate level to pursue education at LUMS.
- Providing assistance to potential applicants to prepare for the LUMS Common Admission Test (LCAT) Reasoning Test by arranging coaching sessions at LUMS.
- Providing tuition, registration fees, hostel accommodation, living and books allowances to qualified candidates.

== Eligibility criteria ==
Eligibility criteria for the NOP are at least 80% marks in Matriculation exams and financial need. The applicants shortlisted on the above criteria appear in the Preliminary Evaluation Test.

After being selected on the basis of this test the students are coached. Then, the students are shortlisted on the basis of their performance in the quizzes and tests taken during this coaching session, and registered for the entrance test, fully funded by LUMS. Finally, the students who apply to LUMS and qualify on merit, are offered admission on full scholarship. There is no separate quota for NOP candidates. All students, whether they apply directly or through NOP, are evaluated on the same admission criteria. As regards assessment of financial need, a review committee has been established to ensure transparency in the process of awarding scholarships to all those who qualify for the admissions through the NOP.

== Application process ==
Students apply to the NOP after clearing their Matriculation exam. Application is normally at least two years ahead of the undergraduate programme start date — students applying in 2010 will be able to join the programme in 2012. Hence, the students of Intermediate parts I and II are eligible to apply.

=== Preliminary Evaluation Test ===
Students take the Preliminary Evaluation Test which is based on the Matriculation and Intermediate curricula. It comprises three sections: English, Mathematics and Analytical. Each section has multiple-choice questions. The duration of the test can be 75 to 90 minutes. Students are shortlisted for the coaching session on the basis of your performance in this test. A sample test paper is available online on the LUMS website

=== Summer coaching session ===
If students are selected on the basis of the Preliminary Evaluation Test, LUMS offer a three-week coaching session at LUMS and selected cities. These tests are arranged during summer vacations (July and August) every year. All expenses with regard to boarding, lodging and coaching materials are borne by LUMS.

=== SAT Reasoning Test ===
The candidates are shortlisted on the basis of their performance in Coaching Session and are registered for SAT Reasoning Test. The application forms for undergraduate programmes are provided free. The forms are filled and submitted in the Admission Office. The admission status is communicated by the end of July.

== Admission criteria ==
Students are selected for admission to the undergraduate programme on evaluation of the following:

- SAT Reasoning Test
- Academic Record – 12 years of education
- A Level, at least 2Bs and 1C grade in three principle subjects. No credit will be given to Advanced Subsidiary, General Paper.
- FA, at least 70% marks
- FSc, at least 70% marks
- The description written in the application matters the most.
