= Cyril Almeida =

Pakistani journalist

- سائیرل المیڈا
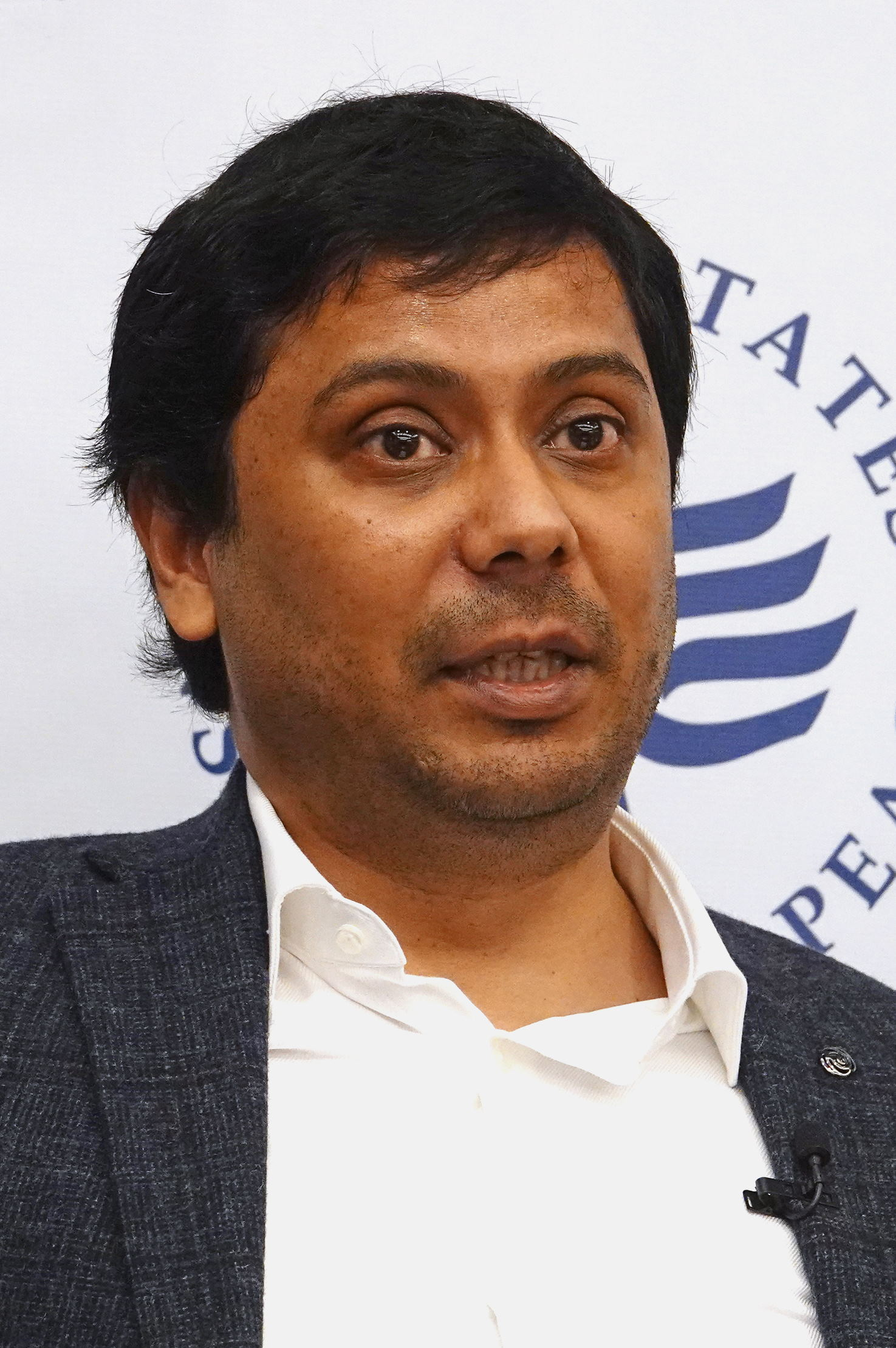
- Almeida in 2020
- Born: Karachi, Pakistan
- Education: University of Oxford; Lahore University of Management Sciences
- Occupation: Journalist
- Employer: Dawn
- Known for: 2019 World Press Freedom Hero

Cyril Almeida (Urdu: سائیرل المیڈا) is a Pakistani journalist who served as the assistant editor and columnist for Dawn. Born and raised in Karachi, Almeida received his B.A. from Lahore University of Management Sciences and studied jurisprudence as a Rhodes Scholar at Oxford.

Almeida was barred from leaving Pakistan after he wrote a news article after the 2016 India–Pakistan military confrontation, and hinted at a rift between Pakistan's civilian and military leadership. Reportedly, he was put on the Exit Control List. However, after three days of criticism by media and human rights groups, his name was lifted from the exit control list on 14 October 2016.

== Life and career ==
Almeida belongs to a community of Goan Catholics who migrated to Karachi, British India, more than a hundred years ago. His family speaks Konkani at home. Many members of the community left for Western countries after the Partition, but about 15,000 members still live in Pakistan. Reportedly, he first visited Goa, India in 2012 to participate in an arts and literary festival, and then followed it up with two more visits.

Almeida earned an undergraduate degree in economics from the Lahore University of Management Sciences in 2003. He was a Rhodes Scholar in 2004 and received a second BA in jurisprudence from Oxford University.

After studying in England, Almeida returned to Karachi. He practised law for about a year and changed careers to become a journalist with Dawn. In 2013 he was promoted to Assistant Editor of Dawn. He is also an occasional contributor to other news media.

== 2016 travel ban ==
In October 2016, Dawn published a front-page article by Almeida, which said that some in Pakistan's civilian government confronted military officials at a top-secret National Security Committee meeting. They said that they were being asked to do more to crack down on armed groups, yet, whenever law-enforcement agencies took action, "the security establishment ... worked behind the scenes to set the arrested free". He reported that the civilians warned that Pakistan risked international isolation if the security establishment didn't crack down on terrorist groups operating from Pakistan.

Following the news article published, both the offices of Prime Minister of Pakistan Nawaz Sharif and the Punjab Chief Minister Shahbaz Sharif denied the version of events printed in the article and called it a fabricated story. Sharif ordered authorities to take action against those responsible for publishing what he termed as a "fabricated" story about the military and ISI after Pakistan's chief of army staff Raheel Sharif called on him to discuss national and regional security issues.

Dawn said that the Cyril Almeida report was "verified, cross-checked, and fact-checked" and it stood by the story. The Editor-in-Chief of Dawn urged the government to refrain from "scapegoating" the newspaper in a "malicious campaign". Another Pakistani daily, The Nation, backed Cyril Almeida's right to write and questioned the government's ability to monopolise the discourse on "national interest". It also questioned why action against Masood Azhar and Hafiz Saeed should be considered a danger to "national security".

On 14 October 2016, the government decided to remove his name from the exit control list. Military sources said that they were not angry with Almeida but they were worried about government officials leaking details of the meeting. The army maintained that it was a "false and fabricated story" and it represented a breach of national security.

On 29 October 2016, the government held Pervez Rasheed, the minister for information, responsible for leaking the information that led to Cyril Almeida's news report. The minister was made to resign.

== 2018 treason charges ==
On 12 May 2018, Cyril Almeida published an interview of the former prime minister Nawaz Sharif, where Sharif is reported to have said, in connection with the trial of the accused in the 2008 Mumbai attacks:

"Militant organizations are active. Call them non-state actors, should we allow them to cross the border and kill 150 people in Mumbai? Explain it to me. Why can’t we complete the trial?"

After the interview was published, the Pakistan Press Council issued a notice to Dawn stating that it published information that "may bring into contempt Pakistan or its people or tends to undermine its sovereignty or integrity as an independent country." The distribution of the newspaper was subsequently blocked in parts of the country. Scholar Madiha Afzal states that the Pakistani military was behind the efforts of censorship.

In September 2018, Azhar Siddiqui, a lawyer, petitioned the Lahore High Court, accusing Nawaz Sharif and former prime minister Shahid Khaqan Abbasi of treason. He alleged that Abbasi had leaked the minutes of the National Security Council to Sharif, whose statement contained such information. Almeida was asked to appear before the court and, when he failed to appear in three sittings, a non-bailable arrest warrant was issued against him. He was also placed on the Exit Control List, banning travel abroad. It was unclear whether the treason charges also applied to Almeida.

== Award ==
In April 2019, Almeida was named the International Press Institute's 2019 World Press Freedom Hero.
