= Houchang Chehabi =

American historian

- Born: Houchang Esfandiar Chehabi; 1950 (age 75–76)
- Citizenship: American

Academic background
- Education: Université de Caen; Sciences Po; Yale University (PhD)
- Thesis: Modernist Shi'ism and Politics: The Liberation Movement of Iran (1986)
- Doctoral advisor: Juan José Linz
- Other advisor: Ervand Abrahamian

Academic work
- Discipline: Iranian studies
- Institutions: Harvard University; St Antony's College, Oxford; University of California, Los Angeles; Frederick S. Pardee School of Global Studies

Houchang Esfandiar Chehabi (born 1950) is a scholar of Iranian studies at the Frederick S. Pardee School of Global Studies at Boston University where he is a professor of International Relations and History.

Chehabi is Iranian-German and was born in Tehran, Iran. He is a former Harvard faculty member, as well as UCLA. He received his MA and DPhil from Yale University.

His publications focus on Iran and its history and politics. His books include Iranian Politics and Religious Modernism: The Liberation Movement of Iran under the Shah and Khomeini (1990) and Distant Relations: Iran and Lebanon in the Last 500 Years (2006). In 2015 he was a Fellow at the Alexander von Humboldt Foundation in Berlin.
