= Muneeb Ali =

Pakistani-American computer scientist

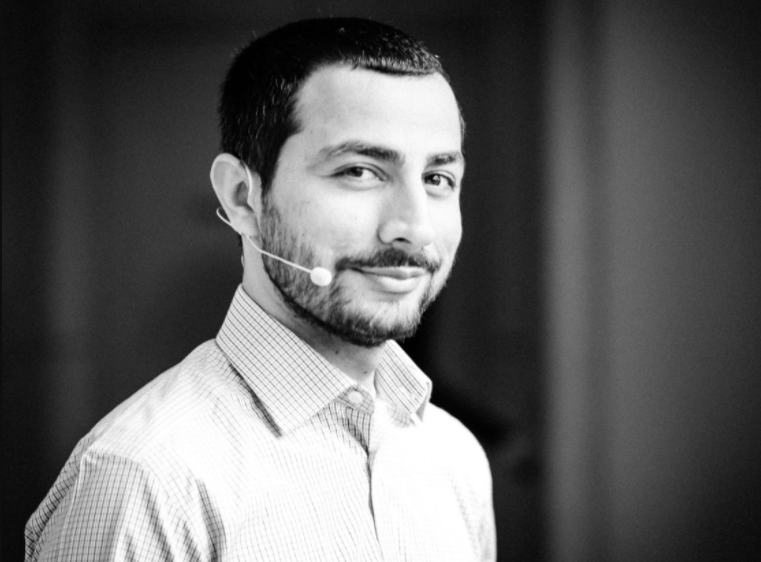
- Education: Princeton University (PhD)
- Known for: Stacks, Protothread
- Scientific career
- Fields: Distributed Computing
- Thesis: Trust-to-Trust Design of a New Internet (2017)
- Doctoral advisor: Andrea LaPaugh

Muneeb Ali is a Pakistani-American computer scientist and internet entrepreneur. He is a co-founder of Stacks, an open-source smart contract platform for Bitcoin. He is known for the regulatory framework that resulted in the first SEC-qualified offering for a crypto asset and for his doctoral dissertation which formed the basis of the Stacks network. He is a co-author of Protothread and Proof-of-Transfer (PoX) consensus.

== Career ==
Ali studied Computer Science at LUMS and received his PhD in Computer Science from Princeton University in 2017. Ali co-founded Stacks (formerly Blockstack) with Ryan Shea and went through Y Combinator in 2014.

His work mainly focused on sensor networks, blockchains, and cloud computing.

Ali was a technical advisor to the HBO Silicon Valley show, and appeared in the Amazon Prime Video Rizqi Presents: Blockchain show.

In 2019, he convinced the SEC regulators to allow his company to start a token offering under Reg A+ exemption, becoming the first to do so. In 2020, Ali released a legal framework for non-security status of Stacks.
