= Asian Journal of Management Cases =

- Discipline: Management
- Language: English
- Edited by: Muhammad Azfar Nisar

Publication details
- History: 2004–present
- Publisher: Sage Publishing
- Frequency: Biannually
- Impact factor: 0.2 (2024)

Standard abbreviations
- ISO 4: Asian J. Manag. Cases

Indexing
- ISSN: 0972-8201 (print); 0973-0621 (web)

Links
- Journal homepage

The Asian Journal of Management Cases is a peer-reviewed academic journal published twice a year by SAGE Publishing in collaboration with the Lahore University of Management Sciences. The editors-in-chief are Muhammad Azfar Nisar and Ayesha Khan.

== Abstracting and indexing ==
The journal is abstracted and indexed in:

- Emerging Sources Citation Index
- EBSCO databases
- ProQuest databases
- Scopus
