= Arif Zaman =

Pakistani mathematician

- Education: Stanford University; Harvey Mudd College; Claremont Graduate University
- Known for: Contributions in pseudo-random number generation and his contribution to the field of Computer science
- Scientific career
- Fields: Mathematics
- Workplaces: Purdue University; Florida State University; Lahore University of Management Sciences
- Doctoral advisor: Persi Diaconis
- Other academic advisors: Jerome Spanier

Arif Zaman is a Pakistani mathematician and retired professor of Statistics and Mathematics at the Syed Babar Ali School of Science and Engineering, Lahore University of Management Sciences (LUMS) in Lahore, Pakistan, where he served from 1994 to 2017. He is known for his contributions to pseudorandom number generation, particularly the co-development of add-with-carry and subtract-with-borrow generators with George Marsaglia. His doctoral dissertation, supervised by Persi Diaconis, was titled Finite Forms of de Finetti's Theorem for Markov Chains. Before joining LUMS, he served in the Statistics departments at Purdue University and Florida State University.

== Early life and education ==
Zaman attended Harvey Mudd College, where he completed his B.S. in Mathematics in 1976. He received an M.A. in Applied Mathematics in 1977 at the Claremont Graduate School, and his PhD in Statistics at Stanford University in 1981. His dissertation was supervised by Persi Diaconis.

== Research ==
Zaman's most influential work is in the field of pseudorandom number generation. In collaboration with George Marsaglia, he developed the add-with-carry and subtract-with-borrow classes of generators, which offer very long periods and good statistical properties. These generators have been widely implemented in computing and Monte Carlo simulations.

His other research includes work on exchangeability in Markov chains and applications in ecological statistics.

As of 2025, Zaman's works have received over 2,000 citations.

== Selected works ==
- Marsaglia, George; Zaman, Arif (1990). "Toward a universal random number generator". Statistics & Probability Letters. 9 (1): 35–39. doi:10.1016/0167-7152(90)90092-6.
- Marsaglia, George; Zaman, Arif (1991). "A new class of random number generators". Annals of Applied Probability. 1 (3): 462–480. doi:10.1214/aoap/1177005878.
- Marsaglia, George; Zaman, Arif (1993). "Monkey tests for random number generators". Computers & Mathematics with Applications. 26 (9): 1–10. doi:10.1016/0898-1221(93)90002-B.
- Zaman, Arif (1984). "An Approximation Theorem for Finite Markov Exchangeability". Annals of Probability. 12 (1): 223–229. doi:10.1214/aop/1176993384.
- Simberloff, Daniel; Zaman, Arif (2002). "Random Binary Matrices in Biogeographical Ecology—Instituting a Good Neighbor Policy". Environmental and Ecological Statistics. 9: 405–421. doi:10.1023/A:1021380323055.
