= Daniella Kolodny =

Rabbi

Daniella Kolodny (Hebrew: דניאלה קולודני) is an Israeli-American rabbi and the first female rabbi in the United States Navy.

== Early life and education ==
Kolodny was born in Jerusalem but raised in Columbia, Maryland attending unaffiliated Columbia Jewish Congregation.

She earned a degree in international relations from Boston University, as well as master's degrees in public administration and Jewish communally service from Hebrew Union College-Jewish Institute of Religion in Los Angeles. She studied the Torah at Pardes Institute of Jewish Studies.

In 1997, Kolodny entered the Jewish Theological Seminary and she was ordained in Spring 2004. Kolodny was in New York City during the September 11 attacks, which she spoke about in a 2002 speech.

== Career ==
In 2004, Kolodny enlisted in the US Navy. She has served at both the United States Naval Academy and the United States Merchant Academy. In 2010, the Conservative Rabbinical Assembly appointed Kolodny as its Community Development Coordinator.
