= Suleman Dawood School of Business =

Business school in Lahore, Pakistan

- سلیمان داؤد سکول براۓ انتظامی سائنسز
- Type: Private Business School
- Established: 1986
- Parent institution: Lahore University of Management Sciences
- Affiliations: AACSB
- Dean: Dr. Muhammad Adeel Zaffar
- Administrative staff: 58
- Location: Lahore, Punjab, Pakistan
- Campus: Urban
- Website: sdsb.lums.edu.pk

Business school rankings

Global MBA Rankings
- QS (2026): 201+

Suleman Dawood School of Business (SDSB) is the constituent business school of the Lahore University of Management Sciences (LUMS). Established in 1986, it is the oldest of school at LUMS. It is named after Pakistani business tycoon Suleman Dawood, father of former commerce minister Abdul Razak Dawood and is Pakistan's only AACSB accredited school.

As of 2016, the school is home to 23 doctorate students. QS World University Rankings ranked the school as the top business school in Pakistan and the 251st globally and in the top 20s in Asia.

The school publishes the biannual SDSB 360 magazine which features articles about industry leaders, rising alumni and faculty research.

== Degrees and programs ==
The school provides 11 programs in various concentrations at the undergraduate, graduate and postgraduate level.

Undergraduate Programs

- BSc Accounting and Finance
- BSc Management Sciences

Graduate Programs

- MBA
- Executive MBA
- MS Accounting and Analytics
- MS Business and Public Policy
- MS Financial Management
- MS Healthcare Management and Innovation
- MS Supply Chain and Retail Management
- MS Technology Management and Entrepreneurship
- PhD Management
