= Lahore School of Economics =

Business college in Lahore, Pakistan

- Type: Private
- Established: 1993; 33 years ago
- Affiliations: Higher Education Commission of Pakistan
- Rector: Shahid Amjad Chaudhry
- Location: Lahore, Punjab, Pakistan
- Campus: 35 acres (14 ha); Urban
- Colors: Red and White
- Website: www.lahoreschoolofeconomics.edu.pk

Lahore School of Economics (also known as The Lahore School or LSE) is a private research university based in Lahore, Punjab, Pakistan and recognized by the Higher Education Commission of Pakistan. It was established in 1993 and chartered by the Government of the Punjab four years later in 1997 through the Lahore School of Economics Act.

The Lahore School school specializes in economics, business, social sciences, visual arts and design, environment and mathematics and statistics. It has around 130 full-time faculty members, 2,800 students across undergraduate programs and 400 across graduate and post-graduate programs.

The Lahore School's stated values are "excellence, integrity, social responsibility, creativity, teamwork, humility and egality".

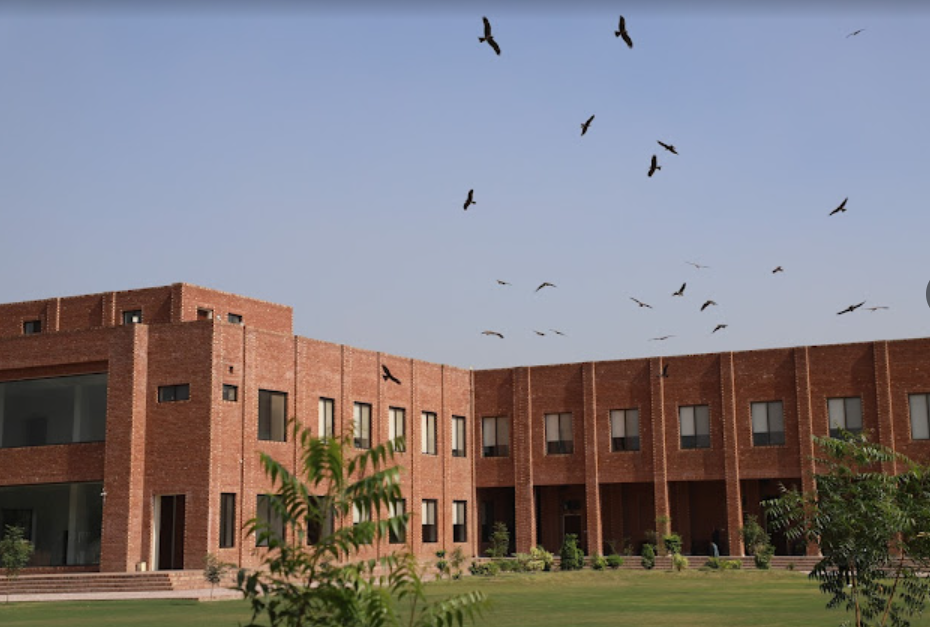
Innovation And Technology Centre in Lahore School of Economics

As of 2025, QS World University Rankings ranked The Lahore School at 124th South Asia and 474th in Asia.

The Lahore School is recognized as a specialist institution in International Trade and is the only institution in Pakistan to be awarded a World Trade Organization Chair.

== History ==
The Lahore School of Economics was founded in 1993 by Dr. Shahid Amjad Chaudhry, a Cambridge University alumni and economist who served as Deputy Chairman of Pakistan's Planning Commission from July 2000 to July 2003, and as Advisor to the Prime Minister on Finance, Revenue and Planning from April to June 2013.

The university was chartered by the Government in January 1997, through the Lahore School of Economics Act (Provincial Assembly of the Punjab- Act II of 1997).

== Campus ==
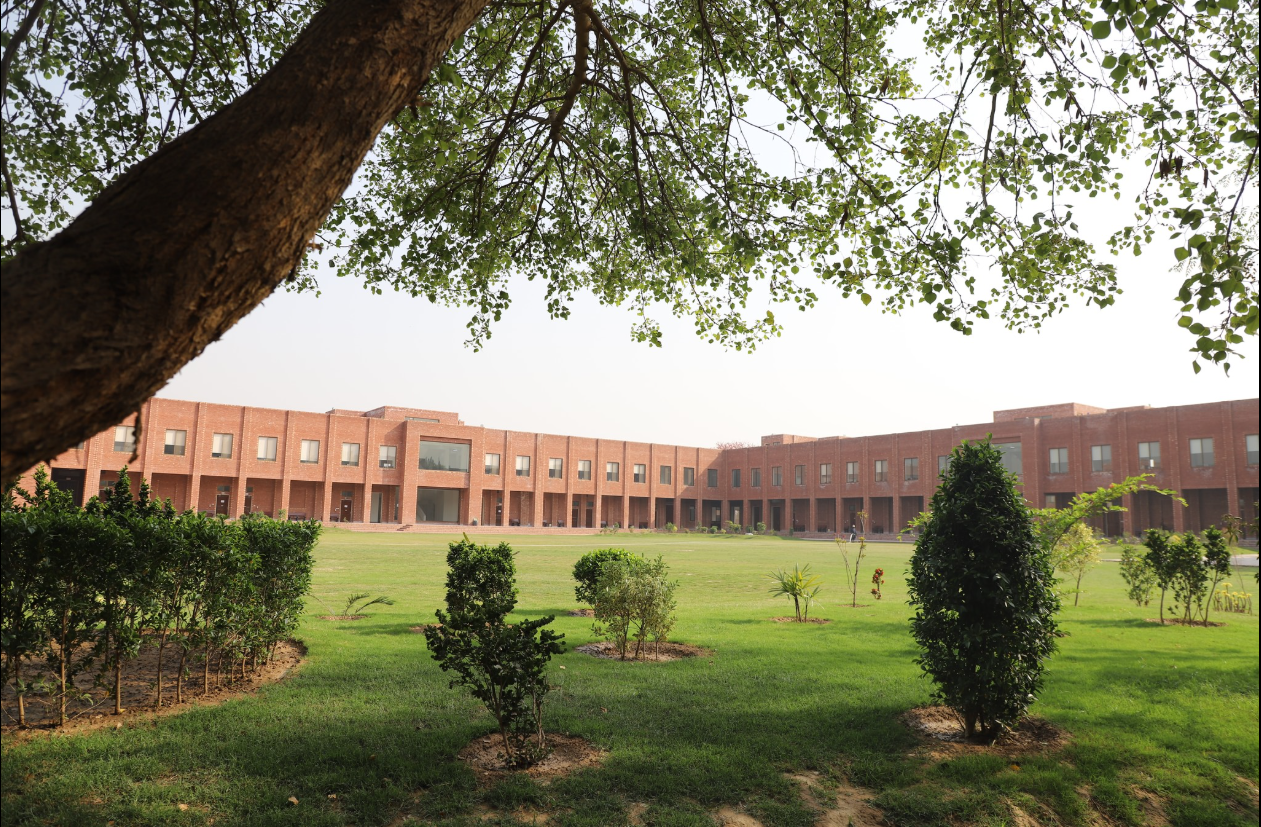
'Vibrant Foliage at Main Innovation and Technology Centre at Lahore School of Economics'

The Lahore School has two campuses; the 'Main Campus' and the 'City Campus'. The Main Campus is located on the intersection of DHA Phase VI Main Boulevard and Burki Road, spread over 35 acres (140,000 m^{2}) and houses The Lahore School's undergraduate programs, graduate programs and research centres as well as teaching and administration facilities, libraries, gymnasium, sports fields, a medical centre, multiple cafeterias and various other buildings.

The City Campus is located in Gulberg 3, Lahore and serves as the admissions office for all degree programs offered at Lahore School of Economics.

== Academics ==
The Lahore School provides 10 undergraduate majors and 26 pre-defined double-major and minor combinations with concentrations in Economics, Finance, Accounting, Business Administration, Mathematics, Statistics, Environmental Sciences, English, Political Science and Media Studies, Art and Design. The 'Accounting & Finance' and 'Economics & Finance' undergraduate programmes at The Lahore School are accredited by the Association of Chartered Certified Accountants, and The Lahore School is an accredited Relevant Degree Awarding Institute of the Institute of Chartered Accountants of Pakistan.

The graduate school offers 2 PhD programs and 6 Graduate programs in addition to the MBA and Executive MBA programs.

Lahore School of Economics also has two distinctive post-grad institutes; the Graduate Institute of Development Studies, which carries out research and training in international development, and the Centre for Research in Economics and Business. Another important centre in the Lahore School is the Innovation Technology Centre.

The Lahore School has two biannual research publications; the Lahore Journal of Economics as well as the Lahore Journal of Business. It also hosts Annual International Conferences in Economics and Business Administration and National Conferences in Mathematics and the Social Sciences.

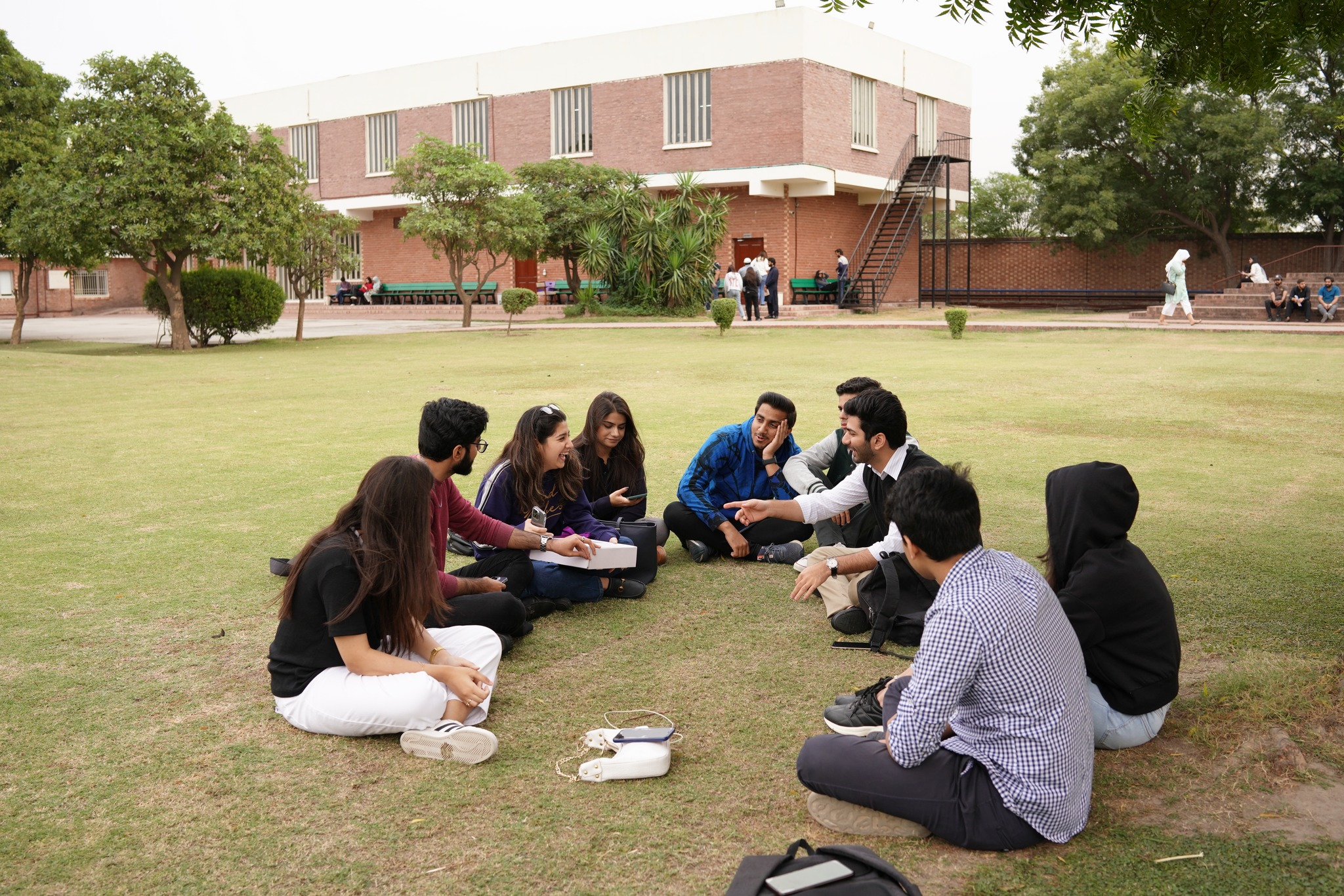
'Shamyla's Garden' in Lahore School of Economics

The Lahore School has an E-Library known as the Lahore School of Economics Repository located around Shamyla's Garden, which collects, preserves and distributes digital material available at the Lahore School of Economics to students, faculty and the public at large.

Lahore School of Economics is consistently ranked in the top business schools in Pakistan according to Higher Education Commission's Business Schools Rankings and top economic research institutions in Pakistan by RePEc (Research Papers in Economics) sponsored by IDEAS (Federal Reserve Bank of St. Louis) and EconPapers (Örebro University School of Business).

== Societies ==
- Association of Debaters
- Lahore School Society of Literature - LSSL

== Notable alumni ==
- Ismat Beg - mathematician
- Kashmala Tariq - former MNA
- Maiza Hameed - former MNA

== See also ==
- List of universities in Pakistan
- Lahore University of Management Sciences
- Institute of Business Administration, Karachi
- Aga Khan University
- National University of Science and Technology, Pakistan
- Habib University
- University of Agriculture Faisalabad
- University_of_the_Punjab
