= Syed Sohail Hussain Naqvi =

Former vice chancellor of LUMS

- سید سہیل حسين نقوی
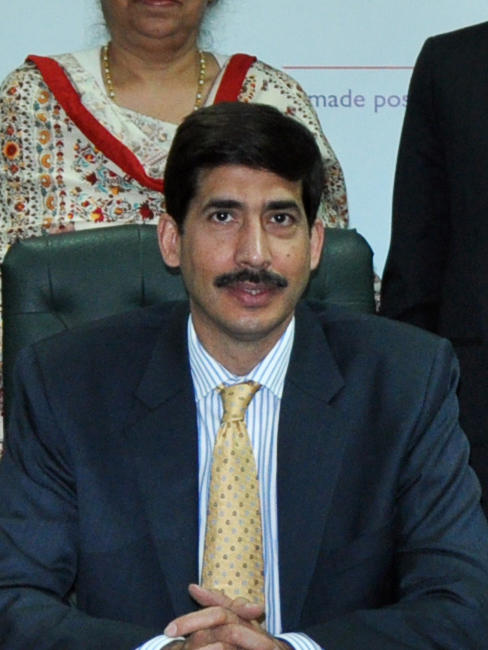
- Prof. Dr. S. Sohail H. Naqvi
- Education: Purdue University, US
- Awards: Sitara-i-Imtiaz
- Scientific career
- Fields: Academia, engineering
- Workplaces: University of Central Asia; Lahore University of Management Sciences; Indiana University; University of New Mexico

Syed Sohail Hussain Naqvi (Punjabi, Urdu: سید سہیل حسين نقوی) is the Rector of the University of Central Asia (UCA). Prior to joining UCA in August 2018, he was the fourth vice chancellor of the Lahore University of Management Sciences. He was executive director of Higher Education Commission (HEC), Pakistan.

== Early life and education ==
Syed Sohail Hussain Naqvi was born in Wah Cantt, Pakistan, then moved to Lahore in 1969. After that he started Pre-Engineering from Cadet College Hassanabadal. Naqvi earned his BSc, MSc and PhD degrees, in Electrical Engineering, from Purdue University, USA. Then he started academic career from University of New Mexico as an assistant professor. Dr. Naqvi has a number of patents to his credit and has also worked with startups bringing high-tech inventions to the market place.

== Career ==
Sohail Naqvi served as an Assistant and associate professor of Electrical Engineering at the University of New Mexico, Albuquerque, USA, before returning to Pakistan in 1996 to join the Faculty of Electronics at the GIK Institute of Technology. He remained at GIKI until the end of 1999 as Professor and Dean. He joined the HEC in 2002 and became its executive director in 2004. Sohail H. Naqvi joined LUMS as the fourth Vice-Chancellor of LUMS on July 1, 2013. He was an independent consultant in Higher Education for a brief period, having served as the executive director of the Higher Education Commission for 8 years.

He is one of the founding members of the Ibero-American Science and Technology Education Consortium (ISTEC), a non-profit organization of educational, research, and industrial institutions throughout America and the Iberian Peninsula. The Consortium has been established to foster scientific, engineering, and technology education, joint international research, and development efforts among its members, and to provide a cost-effective vehicle for the application and transfer of technology.

Also, he is the founding member of Engineering Education Trust (EET), a not-for-profit organization dedicated to the development of higher education in Pakistan. The Centre for Advanced Studies in Engineering is the first project of EET that in one year's time, became the largest post-graduate engineering program in Pakistan.
