= Military Technical Courier =

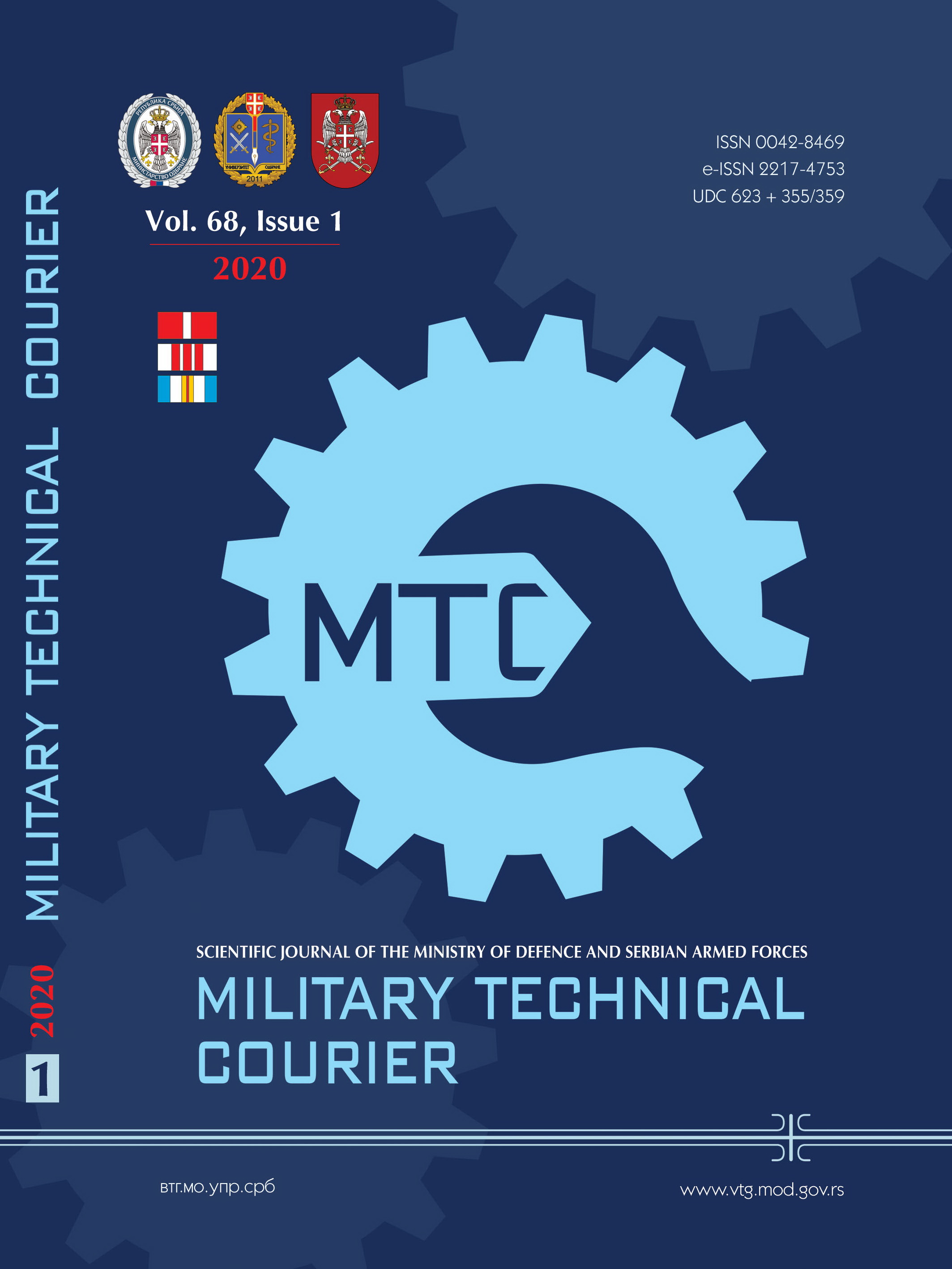
- Discipline: Military technologies and applied sciences
- Language: English, Russian, Serbian
- Edited by: Dragan Trifković and Nebojša Gaćeša

Publication details
- History: 1953–present
- Publisher: University of Defence in Belgrade (Serbia)
- Frequency: Quarterly
- Open access: Yes
- License: CC BY

Standard abbreviations
- ISO 4: Mil. Tech. Cour.

Indexing
- ISSN: 0042-8469 (print); 2217-4753 (web)
- LCCN: 59053278
- OCLC no.: 224695830

Links
- Journal homepage; Online access; Online archive

The Military Technical Courier (Serbian: Војнотехнички гласник, romanized: Vojnotehnički glasnik) is a multidisciplinary peer-reviewed scientific journal published quarterly by the University of Defence in Belgrade. It is a military science focused journal covering a wide range of scientific, professional and technical topics. Its articles are dedicated to fundamental and applied science and R&D applicable in military science, as well as to practical technical achievements in the field. The owners of the journal are the Ministry of Defence and the Serbian Armed Forces.

== History ==
The first printed issue of the Military Technical Courier was published on 1 January 1953. Prior to its release, five irregularly published magazines (Artillery Courier, Tank Courier, Military Engineering Courier, Courier of Engineering and Chemical Units of the Yugoslav Army, Courier of Communications and Logistics and Support of the Yugoslav Army) used to cover military topics between 1947 and the beginning of 1953. This regular monthly journal, the Military Technical Courier, had approximately 1,000 pages a year.

The Courier focused on different technological areas of interest for the Army (e.g. military, engineering, communications, etc.) as well as on army services and organisational issues (e.g. logistics, supplies and provisions, transportation, medical and veterinary topics, education and training, etc.). The latest technological news and reports from foreign armies were given in separate sections.

Between 1958 and 1973, the Military Technical Courier reflected the changes in the Army branches and services by introducing new sections on engines, overhauling, fuels, rocket technique, weapons, ordnance, ammunition, corrosion protection, protective and fire service equipment, geodesy, standards, etc. Supplements on particular topics were frequently published.

The Journal has its printed and electronic form. The first electronic edition of the Military Technical Courier appeared on the Internet on 1 January 2011. All articles are peer reviewed. The Ministry of Education, Science and Technological Development of the Republic of Serbia has included the Military Technological Courier in its evaluation reports in the following areas: mathematics, mechanics, computer sciences, electronics, telecommunications, mechanical engineering, materials science, chemical technology and IT.

== Awards ==
For its contributions to the Army, the Military Technical Courier was awarded on several occasions (in 1977, it received the Order of Military Merit with Great Star; in 2002, the Order of the Yugoslav Army 3rd Class for its 50th anniversary and in 2012 with the Military Memorial Medal).

== Indexing ==
- SCOPUS
- DOAJ
