= Frederick S. Pardee =

American economist (1932–2022)

- Born: September 14, 1932; Bolton, Massachusetts, U.S.
- Died: June 27, 2022 (aged 89); Los Angeles, California, U.S.
- Education: Boston University
- Occupation(s): Economist, real estate investor, philanthropist

Frederick S. Pardee (September 14, 1932 – June 27, 2022) was an American economist, real estate investor and philanthropist from Los Angeles, California. An alumnus of Boston University, Pardee was one of the largest donors to the university. He was a researcher at the RAND Corporation from 1957 to 1971. In his life, he was a philanthropist and real estate investor who owned and managed apartment buildings in Los Angeles. He made charitable contributions to the RAND Corporation as well as several universities in the United States and a school in South Africa. His most prominent charitable gift was of US$25 million to Boston University for the establishment of the Frederick S. Pardee School of Global Studies at Boston University, named for him. He died in Los Angeles on June 27, 2022, at the age of 89.

== Early life ==
Frederick S. Pardee was born in Bolton, Massachusetts on September 14, 1932. He graduated from Boston University in Boston, Massachusetts and received a master's degree from its School of Management in 1954. He then served in the United States Air Force.

== Career ==
Pardee worked as a researcher for the RAND Corporation from 1957 to 1971. He then became a real estate investor, owning and managing apartment buildings in Los Angeles.

== Philanthropy ==
Pardee made many charitable contributions to his alma mater Boston University and to the RAND Corporation, where he worked for many years. In 2001, he donated US$5 million for the establishment of the RAND Frederick S. Pardee Center for Longer Range Global Policy and the Human Condition. Two years later, in 2003, he donated US$10 million for graduate student scholarship. As a result, the graduate school was renamed the Frederick S. Pardee RAND Graduate School in his honor.

In 2000, his monetary gift to Boston University led to the establishment of the Frederick S. Pardee Center for the Study of the Longer-Range Future. In 2013, he donated US$7 million for the Campaign for Boston University, a fundraising campaign. Later that year, he donated US$25 million for the establishment of the Frederick S. Pardee School of Global Studies, also at Boston University.

Pardee also donated to the University of Denver in Denver, Colorado. In 2007, he donated US$7.45 million for the establishment of the Frederick S. Pardee Center for International Futures at the Josef Korbel School of International Studies. Two years later, in 2009, another gift led to the construction of an annex to Ben Cherrington Hall on the University of Denver campus. In 2013, he received an honorary doctorate from the university. A year later, in 2014, he donated US$4 more million.

Additionally, he donated to the African Leadership Academy in Johannesburg, South Africa, where the Frederick S. Pardee Library for the Future of Africa was named in his honor in 2009.

== Bibliography ==
- Weapon System Cost Sensitivity Analysis as an Aid in Determining Economic Resource Impact (RAND Corporation, 1960, 27 pages).
- The Financial Portion of a Management Information System (RAND Corporation, 1961, 45 pages).
- Scheduling State of the Art - Anathema Or Necessity? (RAND Corporation, 1961, 26 pages).
- Measurement and evaluation of transportation system effectiveness (RAND Corporation, 1969, 463 pages).
- New Developments in Transportation Analysis: Evaluation of Mixes of Modes in Alternative Regional Environments (RAND Corporation, 1970, 28 pages).
- Measurement and Evaluation of Alternative Regional Transportation Mixes (with Charles T. Phillips, Keith V. Smith, RAND Corporation, 1970, 126 pages).
- A Methodology for Developing Environmental Quality Indices (with Vikram S. Budharaja, Institute for Analysis, 1972, 24 pages).
- Methodology for Evaluation of the Environmental Consequences of Alternative National Highway Investment Programs (with Vikram S. Budharaja, Institute for Analysis, 1973, 510 pages).
