= Lahore University of Management Sciences =

Private university in Lahore, Punjab

- جامعۂ لاہور برائے علومِ انتظامیات
- Coat of arms
- Motto: Learning without Borders
- Type: Private research university
- Established: 1985; 41 years ago
- Founder: Syed Babar Ali
- Accreditation: Punjab Higher Education Commission
- Academic affiliations: HEC; PEC; PBC; ACU; NCEAC
- Endowment: Rs. 2.3 Billion
- Chancellor: Governor of Punjab
- Vice-Chancellor: Ali Cheema
- Provost: Tariq Jadoon
- Rector: Shahid Hussain
- Academic staff: 300
- Students: 5,768
- Doctoral students: 100
- Location: Lahore, Punjab, Pakistan; 31°28′12″N 74°24′40″E
- Campus: Urban, 40 hectares
- Colours: Navy blue, charcoal, and white
- Website: lums.edu.pk

Lahore University of Management Sciences, also known by its acronym LUMS, is a private research university in Lahore, Punjab, Pakistan. Founded in 1985, it is ranked as one of the most prestigious modern universities in Pakistan.

In 1984, Syed Babar Ali recognized the shortage of qualified managers in the country. He proposed to establish a world-class university that would attract and retain the highest caliber of students and faculty. He shared this idea with fellow businessman and close friend, Abdul Razak Dawood, who was in full support of the vision. The university has since then expanded, launching a liberal arts undergraduate school in 1994, an engineering school in 2008, a law school in 2004 and an education school in 2017. The university also launched a National Outreach Programme (NOP) in 2001 to provide financial aid to students.

As of 2025, the university has a student body of 5,457 graduate and undergraduate students, a faculty of 300 out of which nearly three-quarters have doctoral degrees. Its campus, where more than half of its student population and faculty live, spreads over 40 hectares. Its business school is accredited by the Association to Advance Collegiate Schools of Business. It is also one of two business schools in Pakistan to be certified by the South Asian Quality Assurance System and is ranked as one of the top business schools in the country. The university is also a member of the Association of Commonwealth Universities.

LUMS is ranked as the top university in Pakistan in the QS University Rankings for the year 2016, 111th in Asia and among the top 700 in the world. It is also ranked by QS as among the top 250 universities globally for business and among the top 400 universities globally in mathematics. In 2020, LUMS was ranked 40 globally in "World's Best Small Universities" by Times Higher Education, being the only Pakistani university on the list. Following a liberal arts curriculum, LUMS is one of Pakistan's most expensive, selective and progressive universities. LUMS counts several prominent Pakistani intellectuals and public figures among its alumni and current and former faculty including Umar Saif, Hina Rabbani Khar, Adil Najam, Arif Zaman, Amer Iqbal, Ayesha Jalal, Asad Abidi, Osama Siddique and Pervez Hoodbhoy. It also counts several Fulbright, Chevening and Rhodes scholars among its alumni.

== History ==
The university was granted a charter by the government of Pakistan in 1985. The LUMS Board of Trustees comprises members of the domestic business community, academics and government representatives. The principal functions of the board are to set policy guidelines and to review the operations of the university. The Board of Governors, as the sponsor of LUMS, raises funds for the university's operation and maintenance. In 1986, a business school by the name of Lahore Business School was established for an MBA Programme. Later the school was renamed and is known as Suleman Dawood School of Business.

After the construction of the current campus, LUMS started undergraduate programmes in Economics and Computer Sciences in 1994. In 1996, the School of Arts and Sciences was introduced to oversee the undergraduate programmes. LUMS established the School of Humanities, Social Sciences and Law to oversee the Social Sciences, Economics and Law departments. The School of Sciences and Engineering for the disciplines of Mathematics, Computer Science and other science subjects was established in 2008. In 2016, the university charges Rs. 272,400 tuition fee per semester for undergraduate students. From 2020, the university changed the fee structure to a credit-based system. For the year 2021–2022, the per credit hour tuition fee was Rs. 23,760.

LUMS launched the National Outreach Programme (NOP) in 2001 to reach out to bright students from underprivileged areas of Pakistan. Under this initiative, induction of selected candidates into the academic programs is facilitated by preparation for the university's admission criteria and then by a provision of full financial assistance to those who qualify. Many students are admitted to LUMS on the basis of the NOP. There are a very few number of scholarships that are offered on need/academic achievement basis. LUMS loan scheme covers 20%-100% of the tuition fee component of the student. LUMS loans are interest-free.

According to LUMS, it has disbursed PKR 11.6 billion in financial assistance since inception, with approximately 25% of the student body receiving some form of financial assistance each year. During the academic year 2015-16 alone, LUMS disbursed more than PKR 500 Million as financial aid to its students. As of 2016, more than 800 scholars have benefited from the LUMS National Outreach Programme (NOP). In 2017, the Shahid Hussain Foundation established scholarships for international undergraduate students from South Asian Association for Regional Cooperation member countries. LUMS also offers a variety of scholarships to MBA students, such as SAARC scholarship and MCB interest-free loans. It is the only institute in Pakistan offering the Asian Development Bank-Japan Scholarship Program (ADB-JSP).

== Not-for-profit status ==
LUMS is a federally chartered university and is approved as a not-for-profit organisation under section 2(36) of Income Tax Ordinance, 2001 in terms of provisions of Clause 63 of Part IV of Second Schedule to the Ordinance. Any individual or organisation making donations to LUMS is entitled to a tax credit under section 61 of Income Tax Ordinance, 2001. Moreover, the university has been granted exemption from the levy of income tax under Section 159 of the Ordinance, thus, tax is not deductible on payments made to the university.

== Campus ==
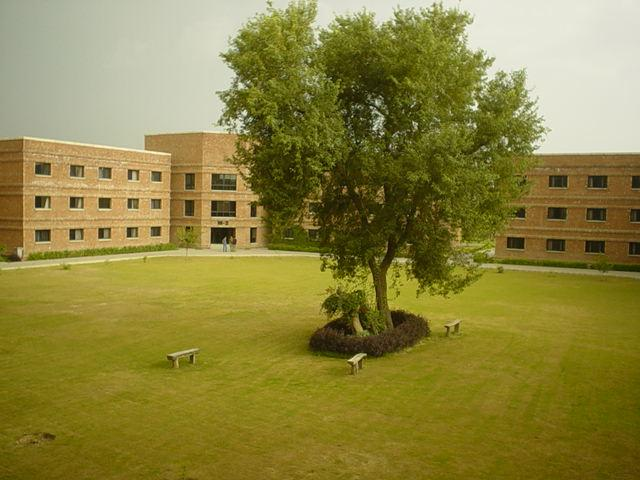
Hostels

The oldest building at LUMS is the two-storey Academic Block designed by Habib Fida Ali which spreads over an area of 14,000 m^{2} (150,000 sq ft). The Mushtaq Ahmad Gurmani School of Humanities and Social Sciences (MGSHSS) is based in this building. The five-storey Suleman Dawood School of Business (SDSB) building occupies an area of 15,000 m^{2} (160,000 sq ft) and accommodates over 1300 students. The Syed Babar Ali School of Science and Engineering (SBASSE) is based in a 5-storey building which covers an area of 28,000 m^{2} (300,000 sq ft); the building includes a 10MW electrical grid station and 20 research labs. The latest addition to the building is National Incubation Center in the basement. The Shaikh Ahmad Hassan School of Law (SAHSOL) spreads over an area of 7,200 m^{2} (78,000 sq ft) and comprises auditoriums, discussion rooms, faculty offices, meeting rooms, the Centre for Chinese Legal Studies and a state of the art moot court which is a replica of the courtroom of the Chief Justice of the Lahore High Court.

More than half of the student body at LUMS lives on campus, which includes seven male and five female hostels. The Syed Maratab Ali Sports Complex includes a school gym and sports facilities for basketball, tennis, cricket and squash. The Pepsi Dining Centre (PDC) covers an area of 1,300 m^{2} (14,000 sq ft), and was funded by PepsiCo. The Coca-Cola Aquatic Centre includes an Olympic-size swimming pool and is funded by a Rs. 22 million grant from the Coca-Cola Company. A new female hostel (F6) is being constructed with Rs. 350 million in funding from the Syed Babar Ali Foundation. The new hostel building will be able to accommodate an additional 504 female students and will provide additional facilities such as breakout places, tea and coffee kiosks, and an open courtyard.

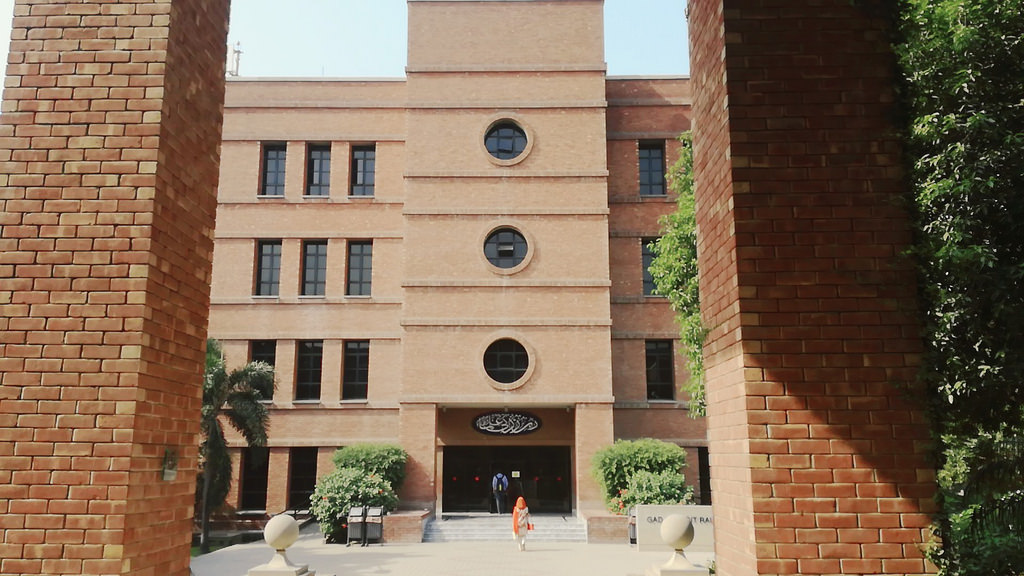
The Gad & Birgit Rausing Library at LUMS houses over 350,000 volumes.

The LUMS library provides services that include loans, online information searching, reference services, inter-library loan, document delivery, photocopying, viewing of audiovisual and microfilm materials, access to virtual collections and digital resources, CD-ROM and online searching. It has a collection of 350,000 volumes, 128,000 e-books and 35,000 e-journals. The library has a multidisciplinary wing (the Khalid Ishaq Wing) dedicated to jurist and scholar Khalid M. Ishaq, who donated 92,957 books from his collection to the library.

The campus also hosts a variety of animals, including their own campus cats, one of the most common animals found there. The friendly cats are protected and fed by the Animal Welfare Society at LUMS.

== Academics ==
School founding
Suleman Dawood School of Business	1986
Mushtaq Ahmed Gurmani School of arts and Sciences	1994
Syed Babar Ali School of Science and Engineering	2008
Shaikh Ahmad Hassan School of Law	2014
LUMS School of Education	2017

The university provides 21 undergraduate majors and 26 graduate degrees. The university consists of five schools which are further divided into various departments.

=== Suleman Dawood School of Business ===
University rankings

Global – Overall
- QS World: 555 (2026)

Regional – Overall
- QS Asia: 116 (2022)

The Suleman Dawood School of Business was the first school established at LUMS in 1986. The school's curriculum was designed in partnership with Harvard Business School and Ivey Business School. The school offers full-time MBA, a week-end Executive MBA, a course-based PhD Management and Bachelor's programmes in Accounting and Finance and Management Science. The school also offers minors in public management and computational finance. The school is led by Dr. Fazal Jawad Seyyed along with Dr. Faiza Ali, Dr. Adeel Zaffar, Dr. Zehra Waheed and Dr. Tanveer Shehzad serving as Associate Deans' of Research, External Relations, Undergraduate Academics and Graduate Academics respectively. Between 2018 and 2023, the School was headed by Professor Alnoor Bhimani.

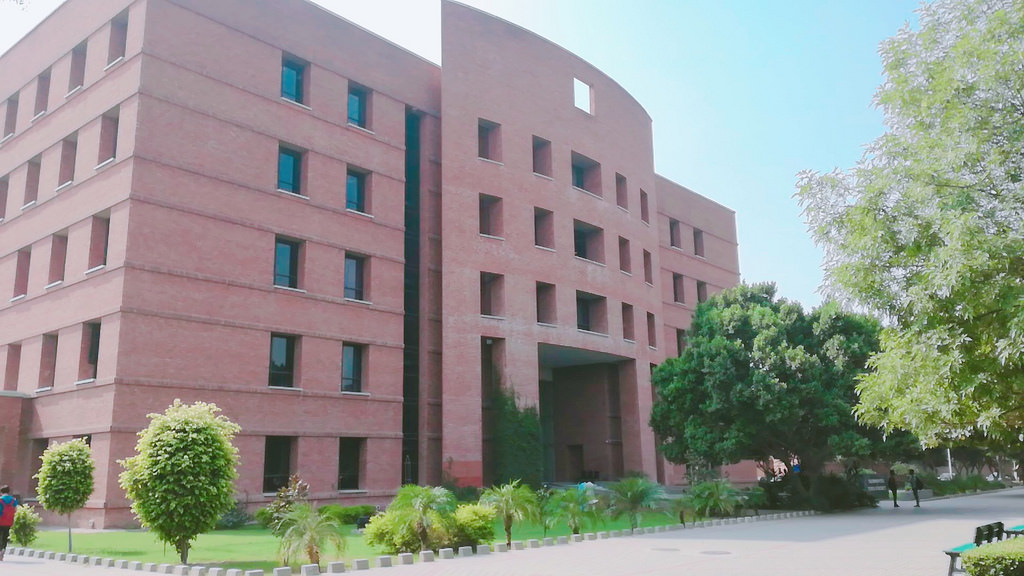
The Suleman Dawood School of Business at Lahore University of Management Sciences was ranked among world's top 250 business schools by QS rankings in 2020. It is the only AACSB accredited business school in Pakistan.

Business Rankings
-	2018	2019	2020
QS Subject Ranking (Business & Management Studies)	251-300	301-350	201-250
QS Subject Ranking (Accounting & Finance)	-	-	201-250
QS MBA	-	-	201+
QS MBA Asia	-	-	23
QS EMBA	-	-	101+
QS EMBA Asia	-	-	15+

The school has research linkages with many renowned universities including Harvard University, McGill University, Massachusetts Institute of Technology, University of Chicago, University of Essex, University of Sussex, National University of Singapore, and Management Development Institute.

On 14 November 2020, SBSD introduced hybrid class structure to balance safety and class-instruction quality during the coronavirus pandemic led by Dr. Syed Aun R. Rizvi then Associate Dean Academics. In 2020, SBSD's Muhammad Abdullah scored the highest marks and was declared the global winner in ACCA's Strategic Business Reporting exam.

=== Mushtaq Ahmad Gurmani School of Humanities and Social Sciences ===
The School of Humanities and Social Sciences, named after Mushtaq Ahmed Gurmani, consists of the Department of Humanities and Social Sciences and the Department of Economics. DHSS offers undergraduate degrees in Anthropology/Sociology, History, English and Political Science, as well as a combined programme in Politics and Economics in conjunction with the Economics Department. The school also offers minors in political Science, Economics, History, English literature, Urdu literature, Religious studies, Sociology/Anthropology.

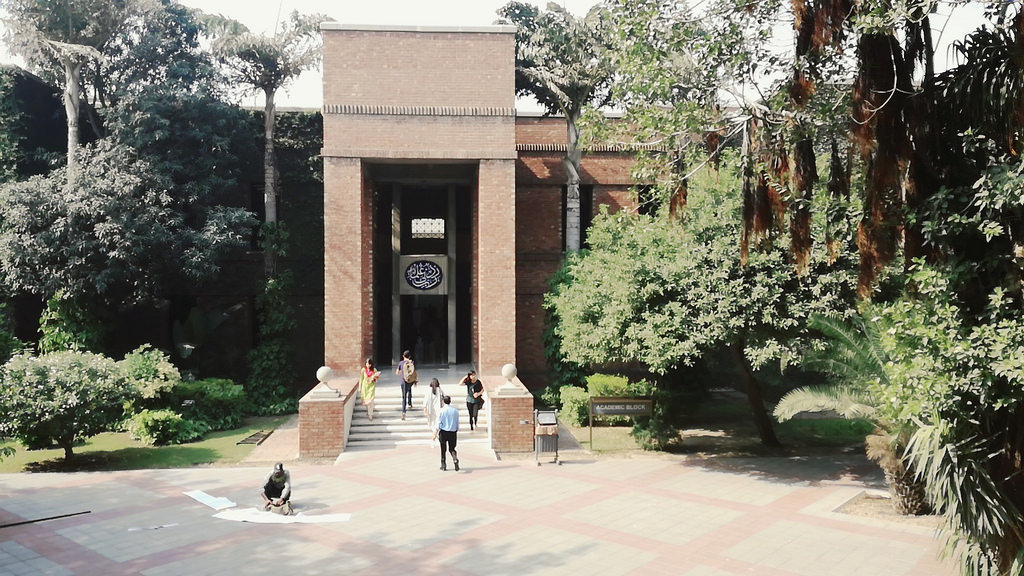
Mushtaq Ahmad Gurmani School of Humanities and Social Sciences at Lahore University of Management Sciences

Started in 1999, the Department of Humanities and Social Science is home to disciplines in the Social Science and Humanities including Anthropology and Sociology, Literature, Philosophy, Political Science, Psychology and History. The Economics Department offers four-year undergraduate programmes in Economics (the first class graduated in 1997), economics and mathematics and a graduate programme in Economics (the first class graduated in 2002). Economics is one of the most popular majors at LUMS and a significant percentage of the student body at LUMS studies Economics as a major, as part of a joint degree programme or as a minor. The school is headed by Dr. Ali Khan.

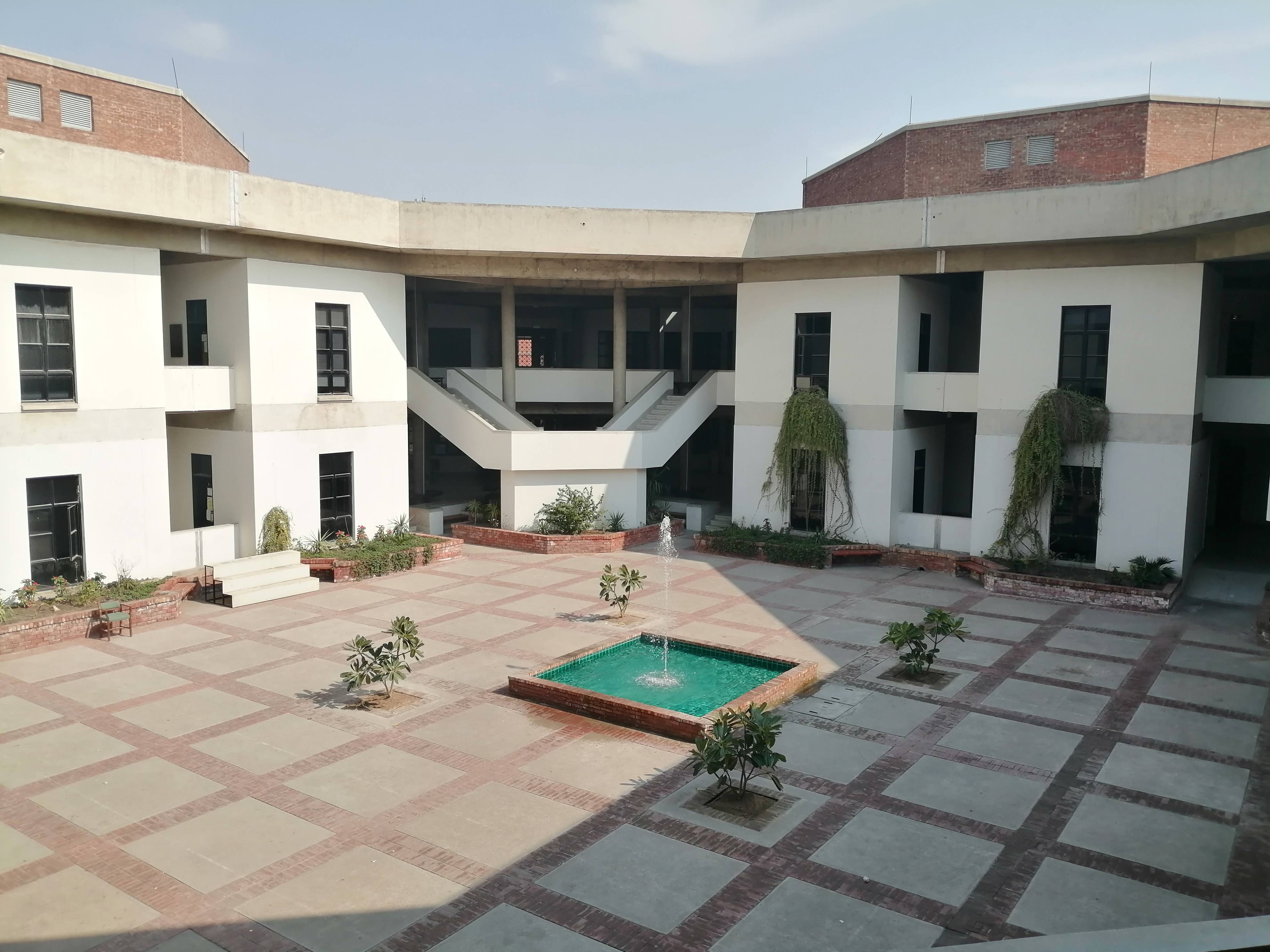
Center boulevard inside Mushtaq Ahmad Gurmani School of Humanities and Social Sciences at Lahore University of Management Sciences

=== Syed Babar Ali School of Science and Engineering ===
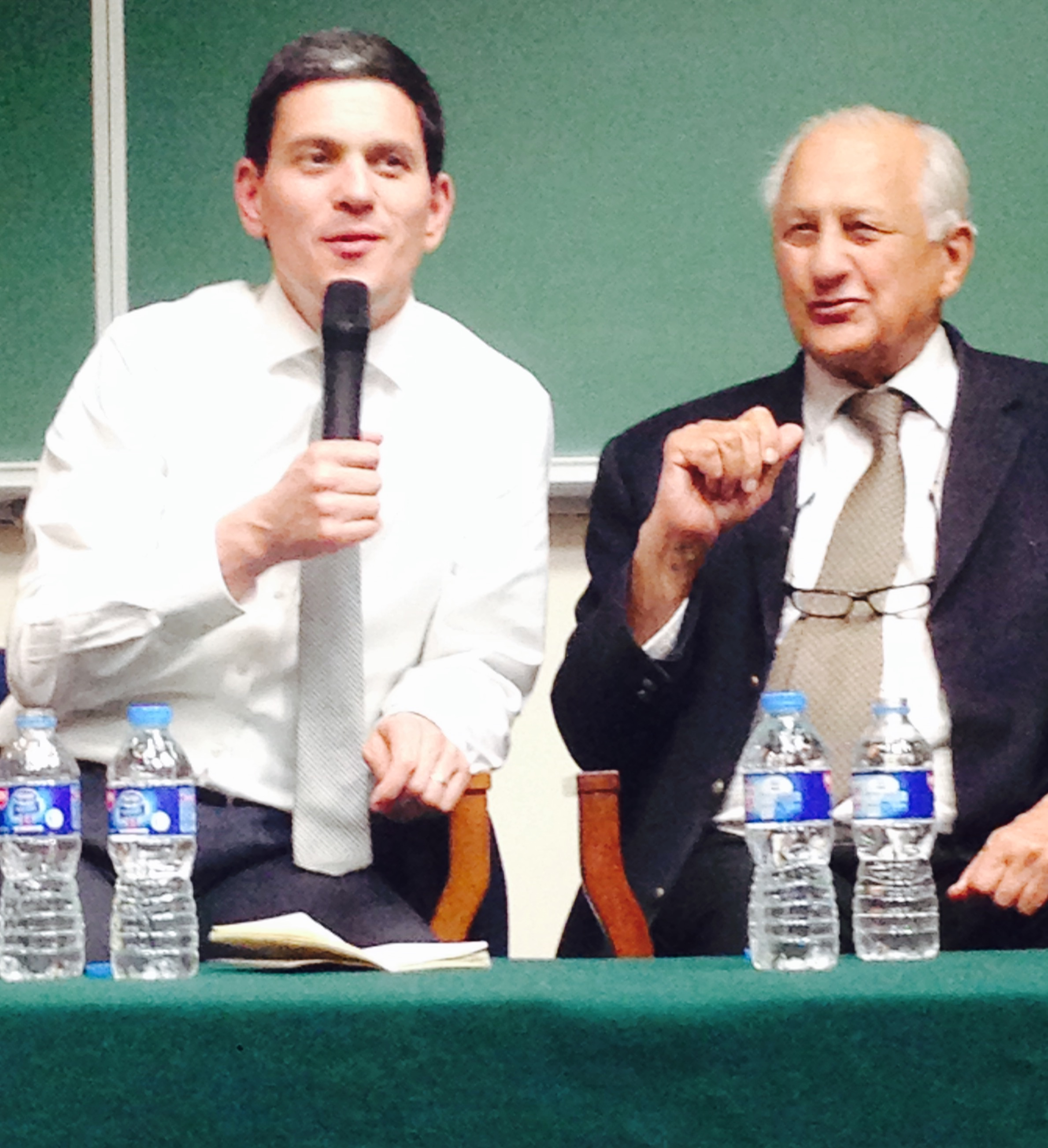
David Miliband, former Secretary of State for Foreign and Commonwealth Affairs of UK at LUMS.

The School of Science and Engineering, named after Syed Babar Ali, is a school within LUMS modelled on an MIT no-boundaries approach. It offers undergraduate programs in Biology, Chemistry, Chemical Engineering, Computer Science, Electrical Engineering, Mathematics and Physics; and graduate programs in Computer Science, chemistry, physics, electrical engineering and Mathematics. A vast majority of BS graduates join leading graduate and PhD programs of some of the leading universities of the world such including ETH Zürich, MIT, Cornell, UC Berkeley, Stanford and Dartmouth college. The school is headed by Dr. Muhammad Sabieh Anwar.

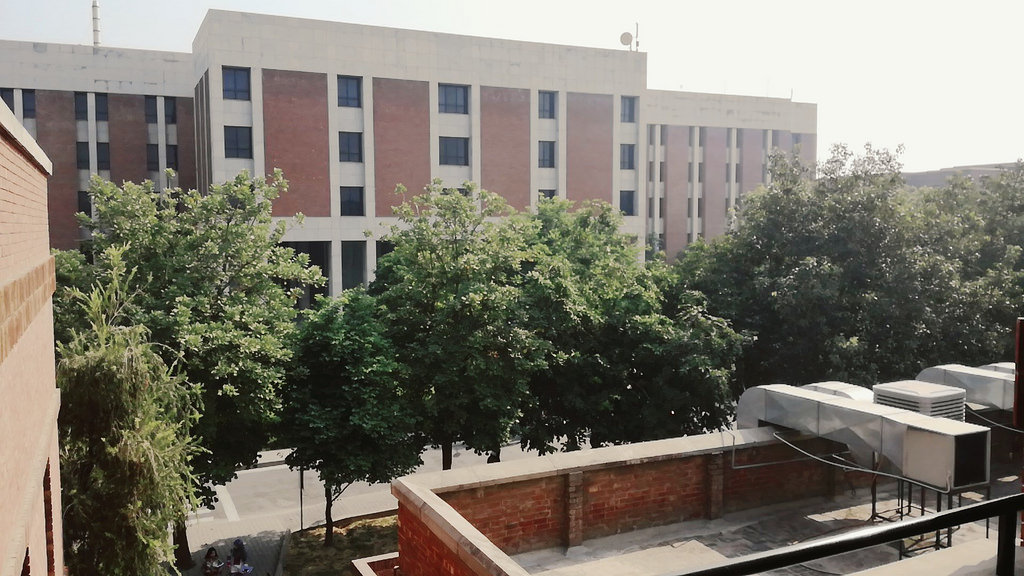
Syed Babar Ali School of Science And Engineering at Lahore University of Management Sciences

=== Shaikh Ahmad Hassan School of Law ===
The groundbreaking ceremony of LUMS' fourth school, Shaikh Ahmad Hassan School of Law, took place on Saturday, 5 April 2014 on campus. The chief guest at the ceremony was the Chief Justice of Pakistan, Justice Tassaduq Hussain Jillani. The law school has been named after the late Shaikh Ahmad Hassan. The establishment of SAHSOL has grown out of the LUMS Department of Law and Policy, which has been functioning since 2004, offers a 5-year joint BA-LL.B undergraduate programme, accredited by the Pakistan Bar Council. The school is led by Sadaf Aziz.

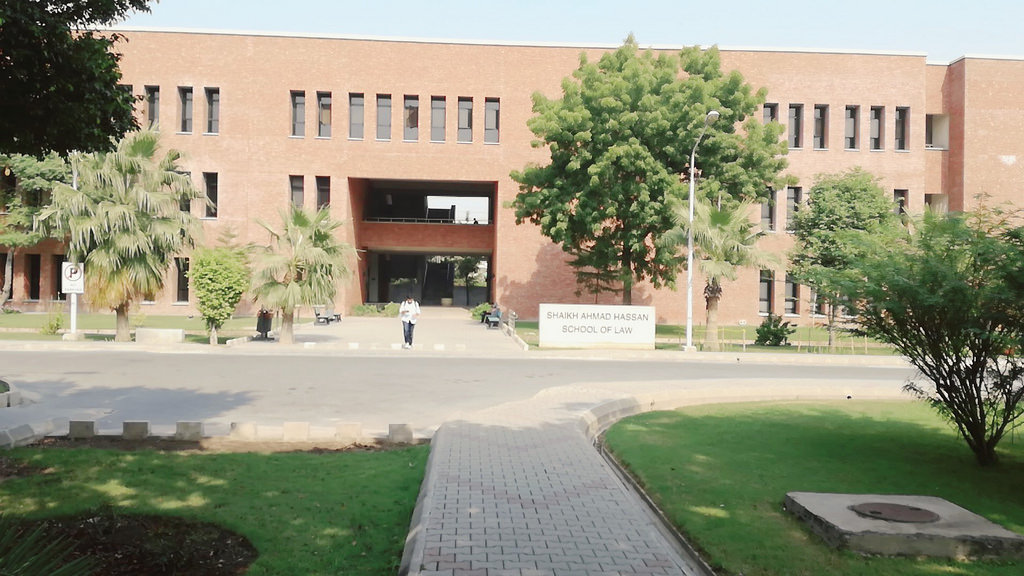
Shaikh Ahmad Hassan School of Law at Lahore University of Management Sciences

=== Syed Ahsan Ali and Syed Maratib Ali School of Education ===
On 6 January 2017, LUMS announced the establishment of its fifth school, the Syed Ahsan Ali and Syed Maratib Ali School of Education. The exploratory phase for the LUMS School of Education was initiated in October 2015 with funding from the Babar Ali Foundation. According to university sources, over the course of the project phase, the team established local, regional and international links through events such as the inaugural Education Roundtable at LUMS in March 2016.

The school will be home to the following programs, starting in Fall 2018.

1. MPhil Education Leadership and Management
2. A minor in education for undergraduate students at LUMS.

== People ==
Notable People

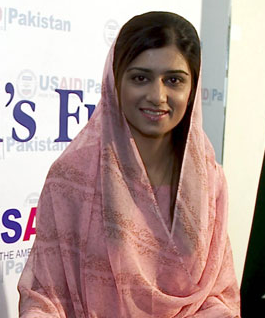
Hina Rabbani Khar

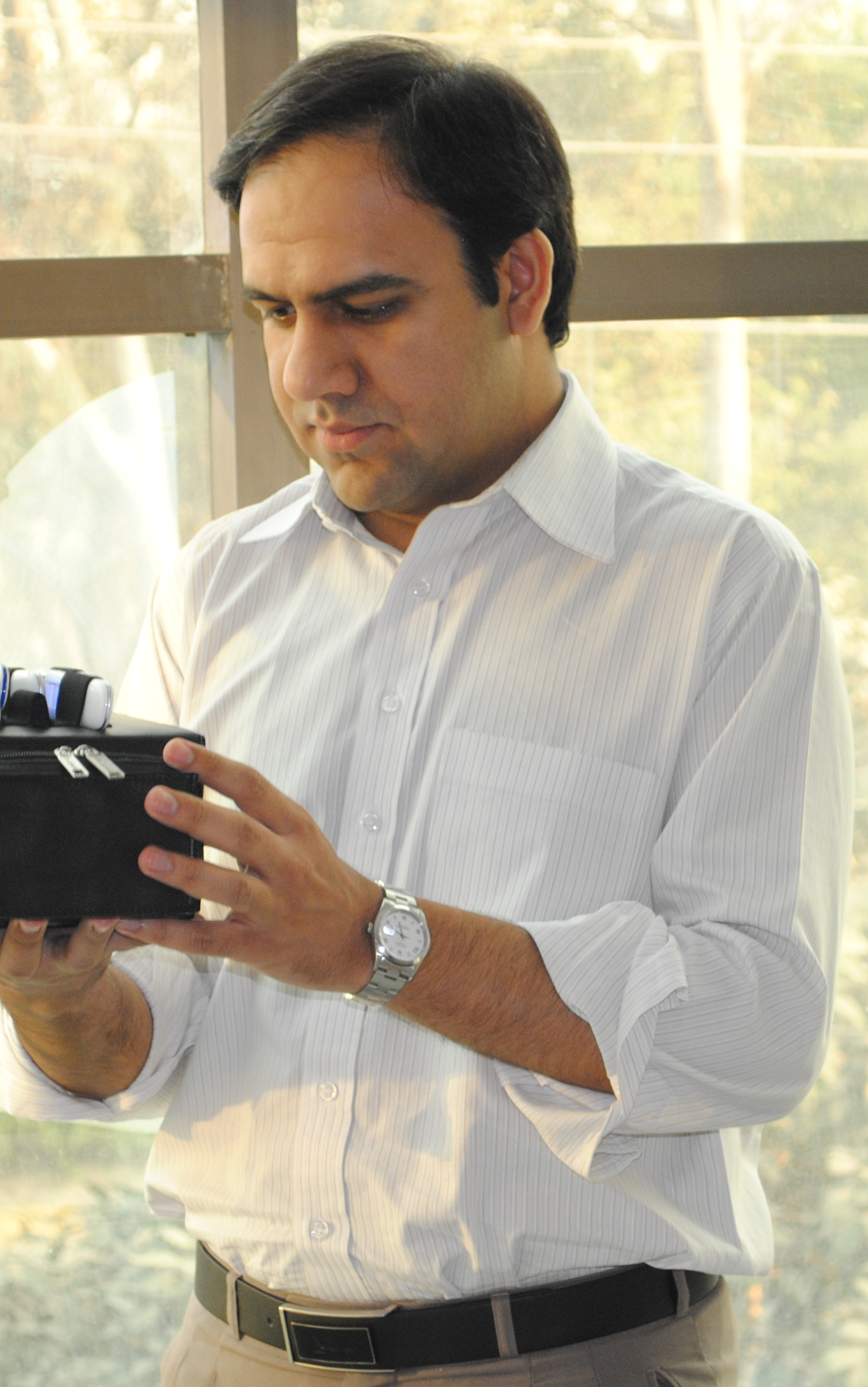
Umar Saif

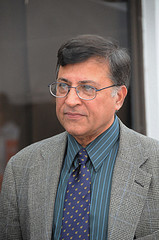
Pervez Hoodbhoy

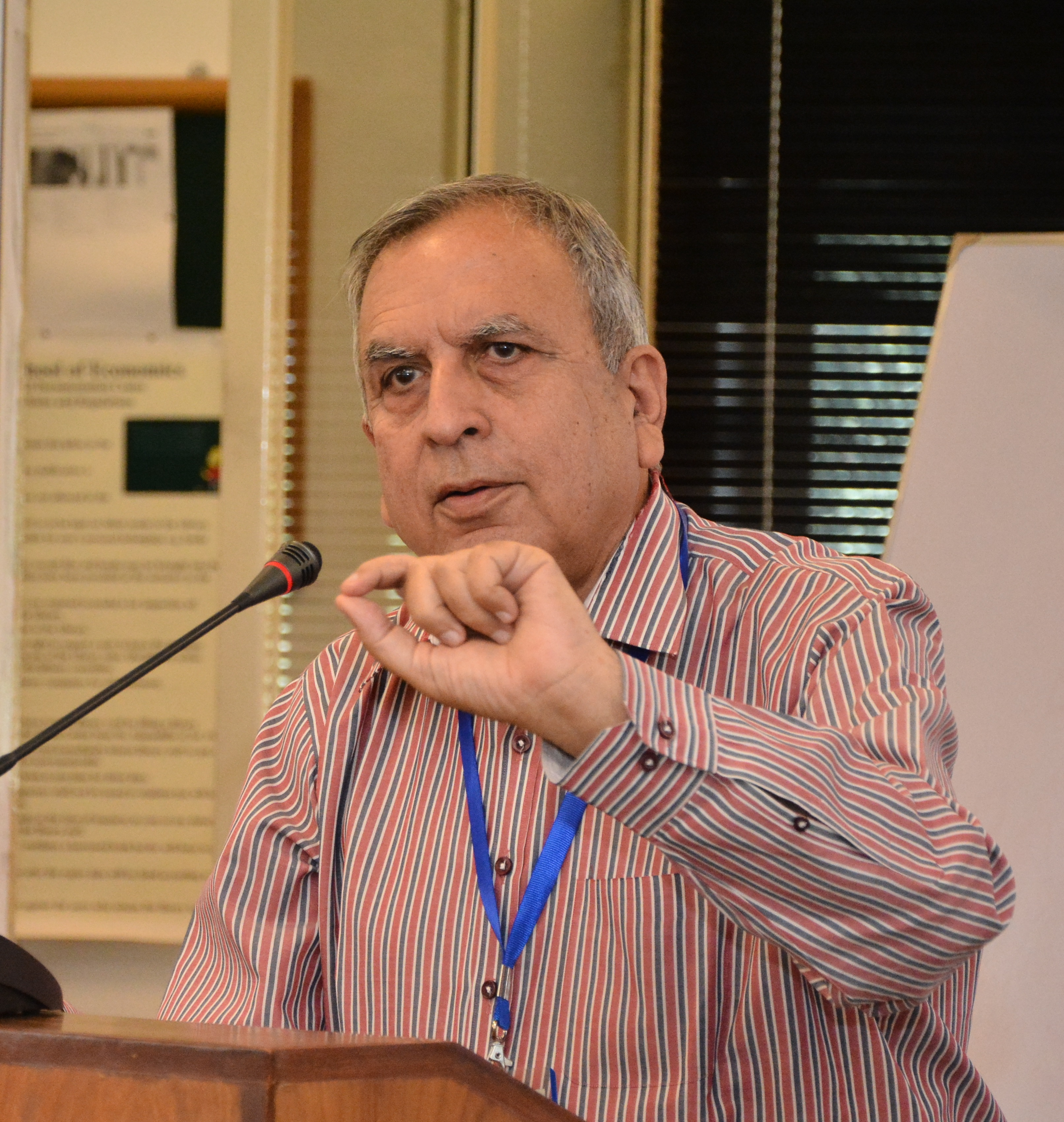
Ismat Beg

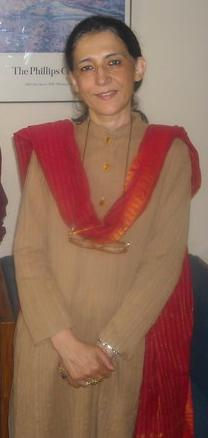
Ayesha Jalal

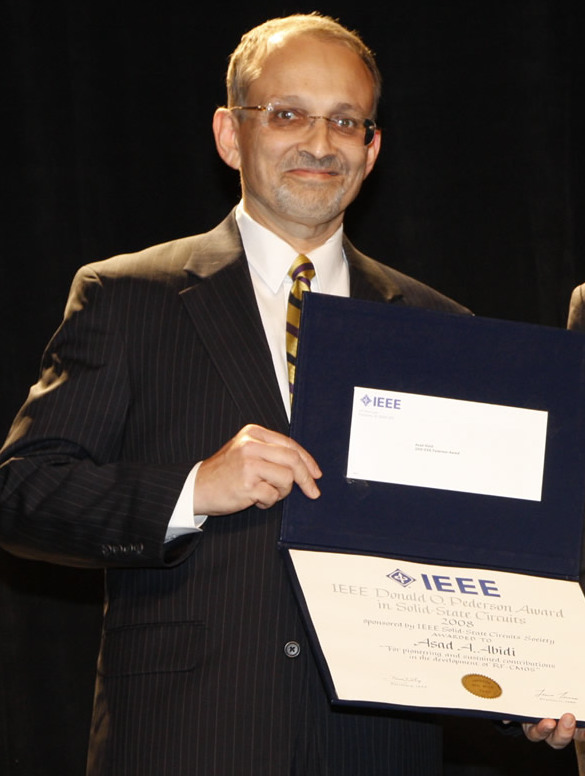
Asad Abidi

LUMS has more than 200 full-time faculty members. Some prominent former and current faculty/staff members include:

- Amer Iqbal (PhD, MIT), theoretical physicist, known for his work on string theory and supersymmetric gauge theories.
- Ismat Beg (PhD, Bucharest), mathematician, known for his work on Multiple-criteria decision analysis, and fixed point (mathematics).
- Syed Sohail Hussain Naqvi, Vice chancellor
- Arif Zaman (PhD, Stanford), statistician and mathematician, known for his work on statistics and computer science.
- Shahryar Khan, Adjunct Faculty, International Relations
- S. Azmat Hassan, Adjunct Faculty, International Relations
- Ayesha Jalal (PhD, Cambridge), Visiting Faculty, History
- Rasul Baksh Rais (PhD, Santa Barbara), Professor of Political Science
- Irshad Hussain (PhD, University of Liverpool, UK), Professor at Department of Chemistry & Chemical Engineering.
- Asad Abidi (PhD, Berkeley) holds the inaugural Abdus Salam Chair at LUMS.
- Moeen Nizami
- Tasneem Zehra Husain
- Iqbal Ahmad Khan, ambassador to Iran

=== Notable alumni ===
- Hina Rabbani Khar - former Foreign Minister of Pakistan, currently member of the National Assembly of Pakistan
- Aleema Khanum - Prime Minister Imran Khan's sister, MBA Class of 1989
- Umar Saif - Former Chairman PITB Punjab
- Bilal Khan - Singer
- Ismat Beg - Mathematician
- Ali Hamza - Singer, Noori musical band
- Afia Nathaniel - Film Director
- Bilal Lashari - Film director
- Cyril Almeida - Rhodes Scholar and assistant editor of Dawn.
- Gul Bukhari, Pakistani journalist
- Haris Aziz, an artificial intelligence scientist who solved Fair cake problem in mathematics
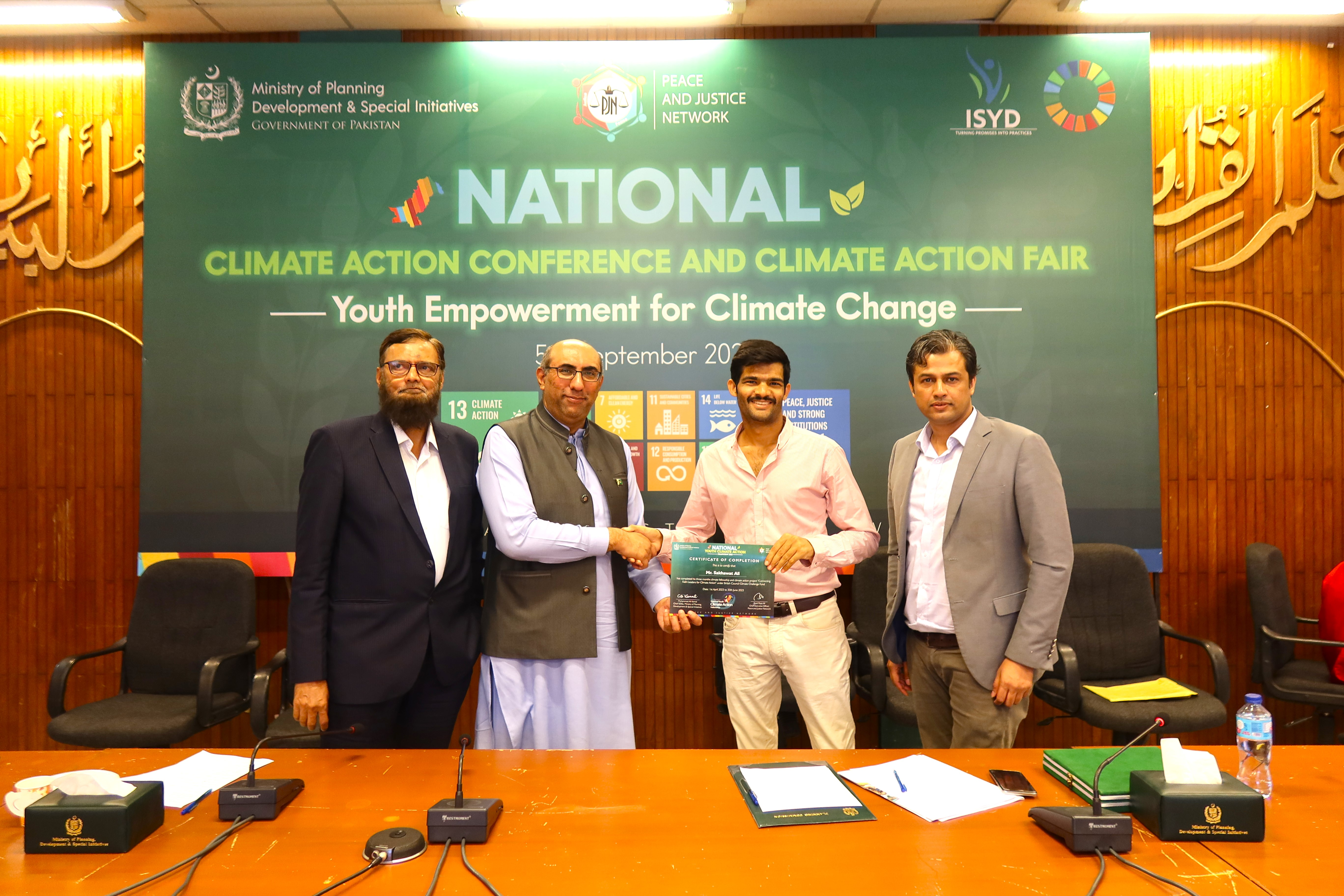
  Sakhawat Ali, A Luminite at 1st Climate Action Conference at Ministry of Planning
  Sana Naeem, Rhodes scholar 2018
- Saman Tariq Malik, Rhodes scholar 2016
- Muhammad Mubashir Bin Latif, Rhodes scholar 2014
- Aalene Mahum Aneeq, Ertegun Graduate Scholar, Oxford University
- Fahad Rafiq, Fulbright Scholar and Faculty Member UVAS, 2015
- Luqman Ali Afzal, founder of the Monal Group and a recipient of the Pride of Performance award
- Dr. Muneeb Ali, founder of Stacks, an open-source blockchain network that enables decentralized apps and smart contracts
- Tauseef H. Farooqi, current chairman of National Electric Power Regulatory Authority (NEPRA).
- Momina Duraid, recipient of Tamgha-e-Imtiaz for her significant contributions to the national drama and film industry
- Sakhawat Ali, recipient of National Innovation Award for his work in environmental sustainability and social entrepreneurship.
- Mansoor Hassan Siddique (d. 2020), recipient of Tamgha-e-Imtiaz for his dedication to public service through his work at the Financial Monitoring Unit (FMU) at the State Bank of Pakistan.
- Saim Sadiq, writer and director of Joyland, the first Pakistani film to make it to the official selection at Cannes Film Festival. His short film Darling won the Orizzonti Best Short Film award at the 2019 Venice Film Festival.
- Suneel Sarfraz Munj, Co-Founder PakWheels
- Muneeb Ali, computer scientist

== Research and reputation ==
	2015	2016	2017	2018	2019	2020	2021
QS World University Rankings	701+	701+	701+	701+	701+	701+	651+
QS Subject Rankings (Maths)	-	301-400	-	-	-	-	-
QS Subject Rankings (Business)	-	251st	251	-	301+	201+	-
QS Asian Rankings	181	161	111	103	95	110	-
HEC-Pakistan General Category	6	-	-	-	-	-	-

The Office of Sponsored Programmes and Research (OSPR) of LUMS is responsible for promoting research at the university. The office is led by Shafay Shamail (PhD, Bath). Between 2010 and 2014, the university spent PKR 680 million (or about $6.5 million) in research. During this period about LUMS faculty published 1287 research papers and received 80 external grants.

The Suleman Dawood School of Business has produced more than 600 case studies and has published one of Asia's leading case research journals. Case studies written at LUMS are now used in universities across the world, including MBA programs in other Pakistani universities. In 2011, a case study written at LUMS by Shazib Shaikh and Zahoor Hassan won the Ruth Greene Memorial Award of the North American Case Research Association (NACRA) for the best case written outside North America.

The LUMS School of Science and Engineering has published in international journals in Chemistry, Biology, Mathematics, Physics, Computer Science and Electrical Engineering.

The biomechanics lab at LUMS is the sixth International Cricket Council (ICC)-accredited cricket lab in the world, following those in Brisbane, Chennai, Loughborough and Pretoria. The lab is able to perform bowling tests of international and domestic cricketers whose bowling actions are deemed illegal.

Additionally, LUMS publishes the 'Asian Journal of Management Cases' in collaboration with Sage Publishing Pvt. Ltd., focusing on case studies and management practices in Asia.

=== Technology for People Initiative ===
Technology for People Initiative (TPI) is a technology and design nonprofit centre at the Lahore University of Management Sciences in Lahore, Pakistan. It is focused on solving governance problems in the public sector through design thinking, prototyping and iteration. TPI's past and ongoing projects include evidence based policing for Lahore Police, CourtBeat for judicial courts, mapping rural Pakistan and the Bahawalpur Service Delivery Unit. The centre was founded in April 2012 with a seed grant from Google.org.

=== Rausing Executive Development Centre, Lahore University of Management Sciences ===
REDC placed under the aegis of the Suleman Dawood School of Business at LUMS, Rausing Executive Development Centre has been pioneering executive education in Pakistan. It is housed in a purpose built facility. From three programmes in 1989, REDC now lists 21 programmes in its annual calendar for Open Programmes and conducts 70 programmes every year inclusive of customized programmes.

Other prominent research and development centres at the university include:

- Centre for Water Informatics and Technology
- Centre for Business and Society
- National Incubation Centre Lahore
- LUMS Energy Institute
- The National Centre in Big Data and Cloud Computing
- Centre for Islamic Finance
- Mahbub ul Haq Research Centre
- Centre for Chinese Legal Studies
- LUMS Learning Institute
- Centre for Continuing Education Studies
- Gurmani Centre for Languages and Literature
- Saida Waheed Gender Initiative

The university also houses the Pakistan office of the International Growth Centre.

== University Advisory Board ==
The advisory board of the university consists of leading academics from around the world, current members of the board include:

- Prof. Nicholas A. Robinson (Pace University School of Law)
- Dr. Maria Yudkevich (Higher School of Economics)
- Dr. David Wilkinson (McMaster University)
- Ms. Leah Rosovsky (Harvard Business School)
- Dr. Greg Moran (University of Western Ontario)
- Dr. Mehmood Khan (Life Biosciences)
- Prof. Denise Chalmers (University of Western Australia)
- Dr. David Bloom (Harvard University)
- Dr. Khalid Aziz (Stanford University)
- Dr. Philip Altbach (Boston College)
- Dr. Nancy J. Adler (McGill University)

== Societies ==
- Rizq LUMS Society, the university chapter of the social enterprise Rizq, which was also founded by LUMS Alumni
- LUMS Arts Society
- LUMS Law & Politics Society
- Sports Society at LUMS
- LUMS Community Service Society (LCSS)
- AIESEC LUMS Chapter
- LUMS Students' Mathematics Society (LSMS)
- DANCELUMS
- Riayat LUMS Chapter
- Institute of Electrical and Electronics Engineers (IEEE) - LUMS Student Chapter
- LUMS Emergency Medical Services, Pakistan's ever student-managed EMS established in a university campus with technical assistance from Rescue 1122 in 2008-09
- LUMS Model United Nations (LUMUN)
- LUMS Society of Chemical Sciences & Engineering (LSCSE)
- LUMS Finance Society (FINTRA)
- LUMS Media Arts Society (LMA)
- Society For Promotion and Development of Engineering and Sciences (SPADES)
- The Music Society of LUMS
- Debates and Recitations at LUMS (DRUMS)
- LUMS Society of Professional Accountancy (LSPA)
- FEMSOC (Feminist Society)
- INDEX: The Design and Innovation Society
- LUMS Women in Computing (LWiC)
- LUMS Literary Society
- LUMS Daily Student
- LUMS Dramatics Society (Dramaline)
- LUMS Policy Research Institute (LPRI)
- LUMS Consultancy Group (LCG)
- LUMS Religious Society
- LUMS Chess Club

== Gallery ==
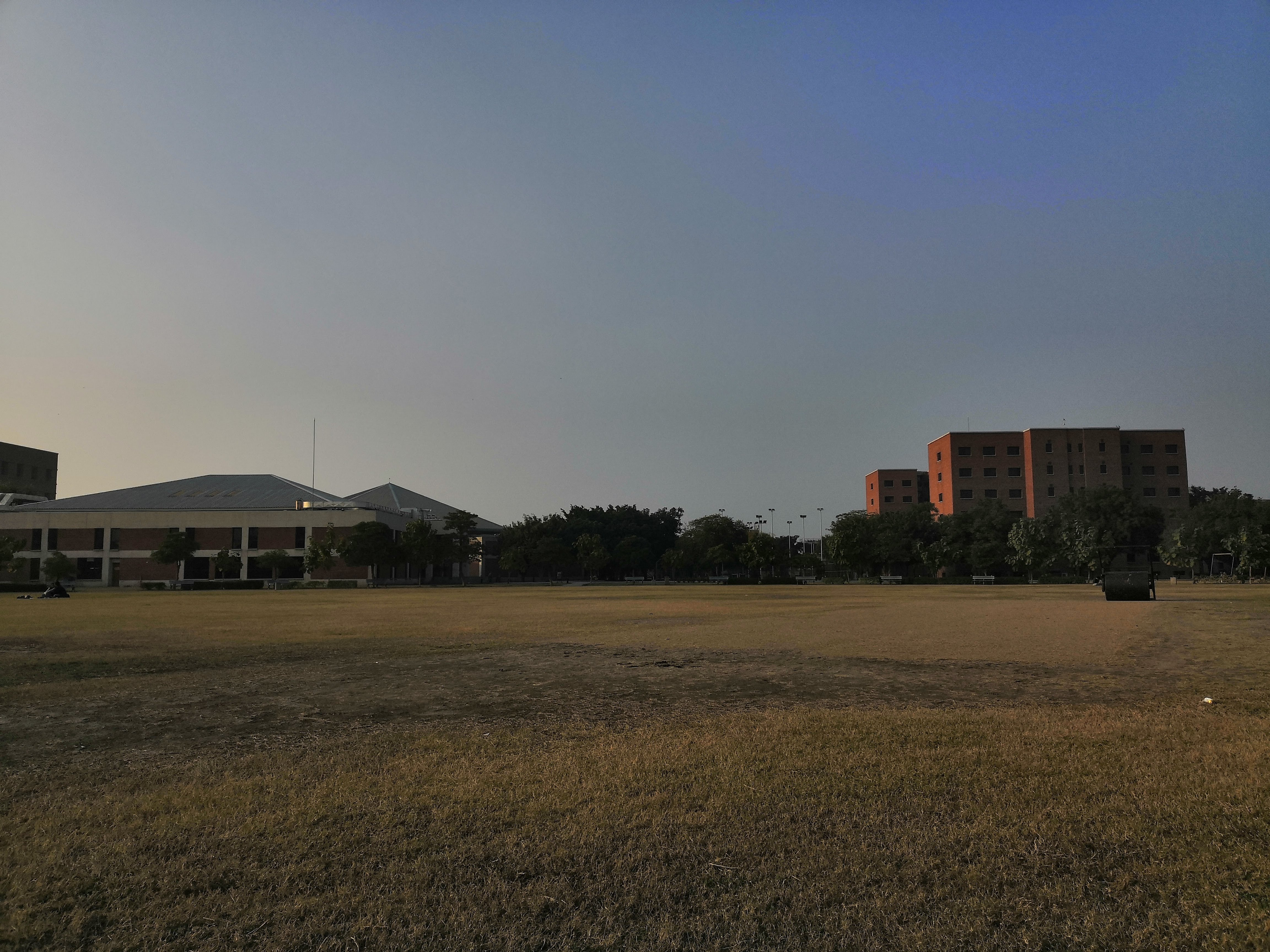
The Cricket Ground overlooking the Male Hostel 7 (M7) and the Aquatic Center

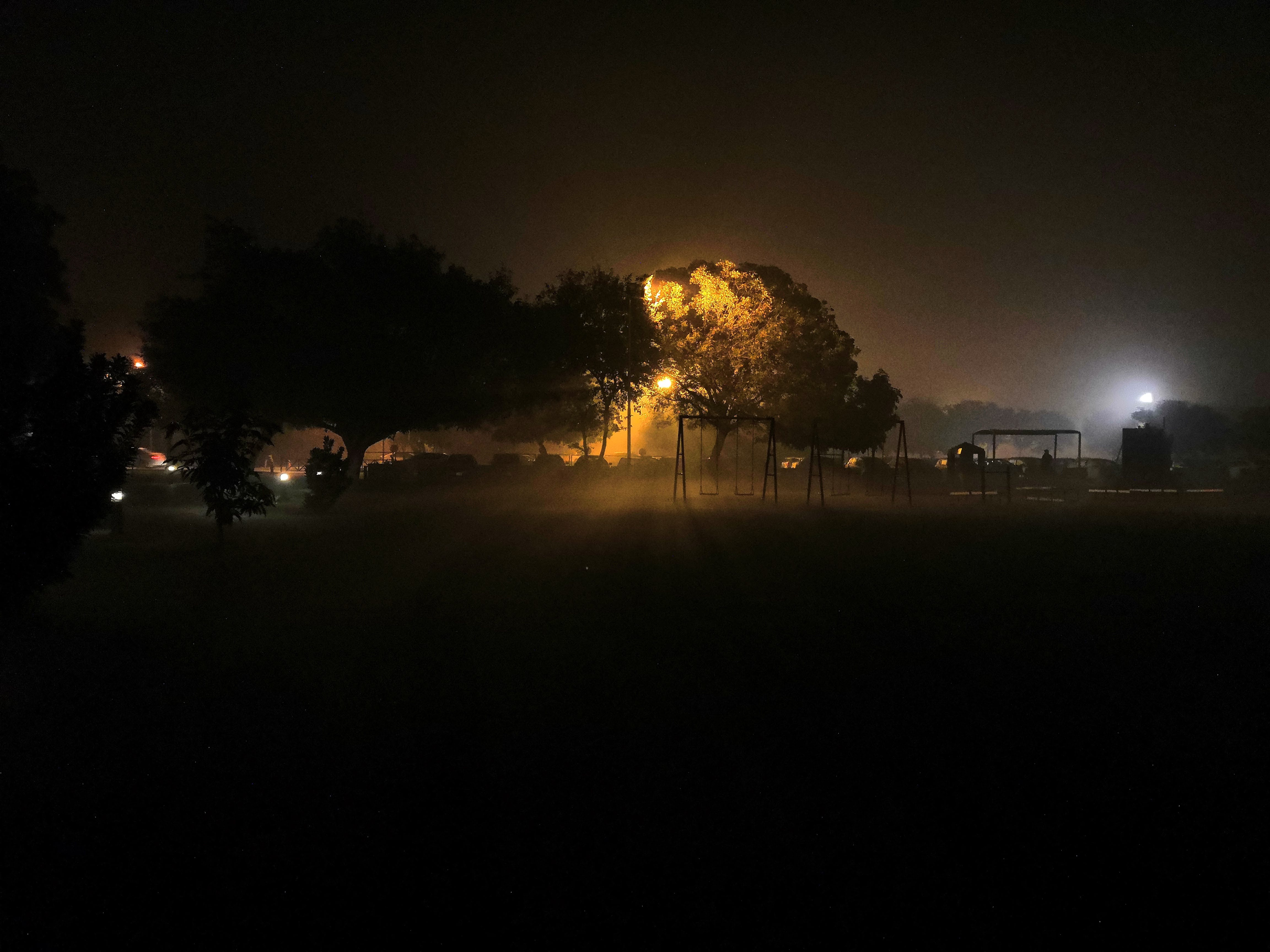
The LUMS Swings at Night

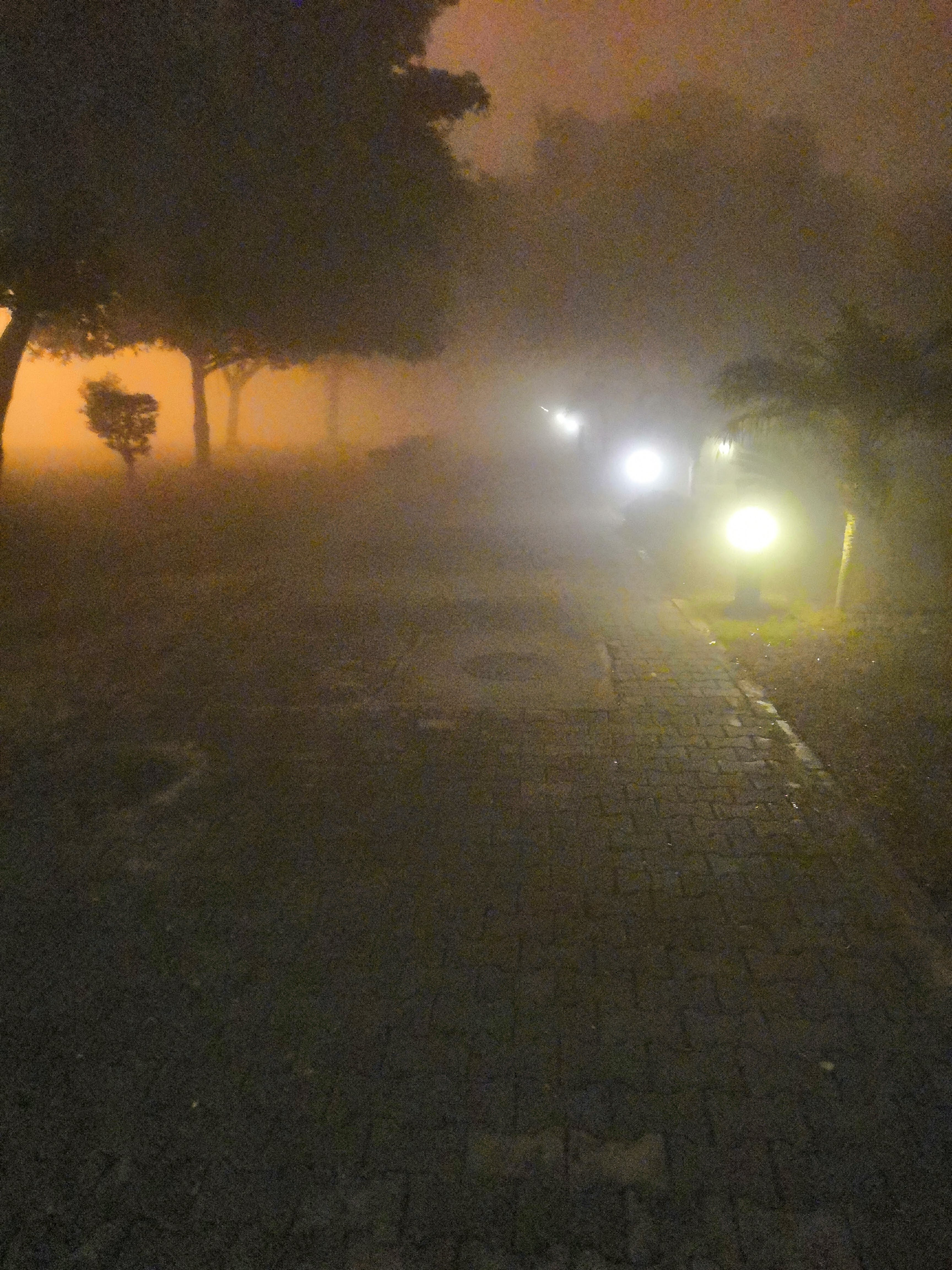
A Foggy Pathway to the cricket ground and the aquatic center during the month of December

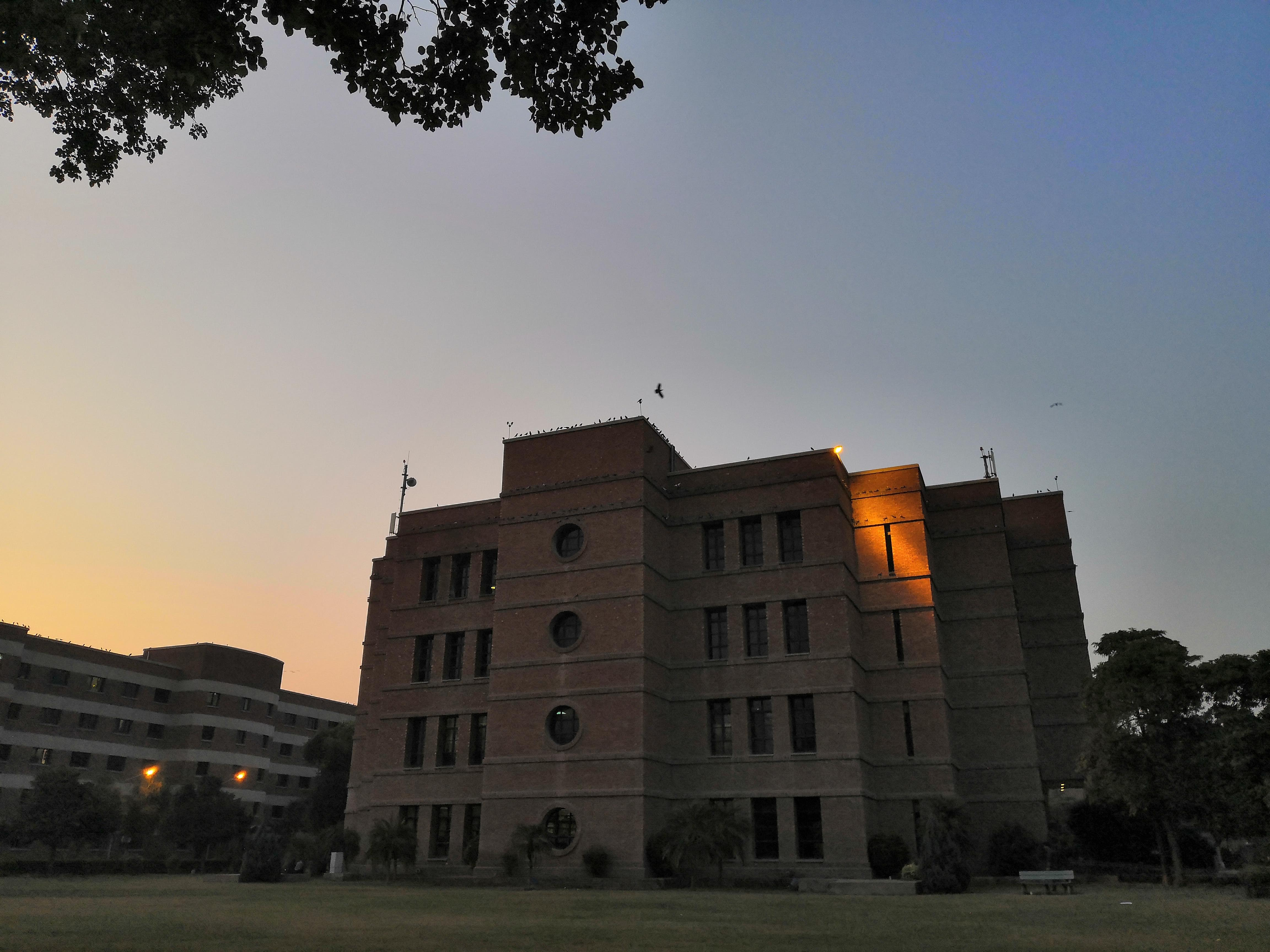
The eastern facade of the library building during an evening

== See also ==
- Education in Pakistan
- List of universities in Pakistan
- List of engineering universities in Pakistan
- Lahore School of Economics
- Habib University
- University of Agriculture Faisalabad
- Aga Khan University
- National University of Science and Technology, Pakistan
