= Adam Lupel =

American political scientist and NGO executive

- Born: February 1970 (age 56); Chicago, Illinois
- Education: Boston University, New School for Social Research
- Occupation: Executive Director of the Coalition for the UN We Need
- Notable work: Responding to Genocide: The Politics of International Action (2013)

Adam Lupel (born 1970 in Chicago) is a writer and international relations expert.

== Biography ==
Lupel was born in Chicago, Illinois, in 1970. He received his bachelor's degree in international relations with a concentration in Latin America from Boston University and his PhD in political theory and master's in liberal studies from the New School for Social Research.

== Career ==
Adam Lupel has been serving as the Executive Director of the Coalition for the UN We Need (C4UN) since September 2025.

Lupel, before joining C4UN, was the Vice President and Chief Operating Officer at the International Peace Institute (IPI), 2016-2025. He served as IPI Acting President and CEO from October 2020 to March 2021. Between 2014 and 2016 he was the director of research for the Independent Commission on Multilateralism. In 2015, he also led IPI's support to the General Assembly-mandated "Lessons Learned Exercise" on the UN Mission for Ebola Emergency Response, working in close collaboration with the Executive Office of the Secretary-General.

Prior to 2006, when he joined IPI as Editor, he was the Managing Editor of Constellations: An International Journal of Critical and Democratic Theory, and he taught modern and contemporary political theory at The New School's Eugene Lang College in New York. He has a PhD in political theory and an MA in liberal studies from the New School for Social Research and a BA in international relations with a concentration in Latin America from Boston University.

Lupel is the author of Globalization and Popular Sovereignty: Democracy’s Transnational Dilemma (2009) and the co-editor of Peace Operations and Organized Crime: Enemies or Allies? (2011) and Responding to Genocide: The Politics of International Action (2013). His current work is on issues related to globalization, multilateralism, and the prevention of mass atrocities.
