= List of Pakistani inventions and discoveries =

This article lists inventions and discoveries made by scientists with Pakistani nationality within Pakistan and outside the country, post the independence of Pakistan in 1947.

== Chemistry ==
- Development of the world's first workable plastic magnet at room temperature by organic chemist and polymer scientist Naveed Zaidi.

== Physics ==
Standard model of Electroweak Interaction.

- Discovery of electroweak interaction by Abdus Salam, along with two Americans Sheldon Glashow and Steven Weinberg. The discovery led them to receive the Nobel Prize in Physics.
- Abdus Salam who along with Steven Weinberg independently predicted the existence of a subatomic particle now called the Higgs boson, Named after a British physicist who theorized that it endowed other particles with mass.
- The development of the Standard Model of particle physics by Sheldon Glashow's discovery in 1960 of a way to combine the electromagnetic and weak interactions. In 1967 Steven Weinberg and Abdus Salam incorporated the Higgs mechanism into Glashow's electroweak theory, giving it its modern form.

== Nuclear energy ==
- Sultan Bashiruddin Mahmood a Pakistani nuclear engineer developed a device to detect heavy water leaks in nuclear steam cylinders while working at Knapp nuclear power reactor near Karachi in 1972. The device is patent in his name under his initials SBM probe and is widely used in nuclear power plants to date.

== Medicine ==
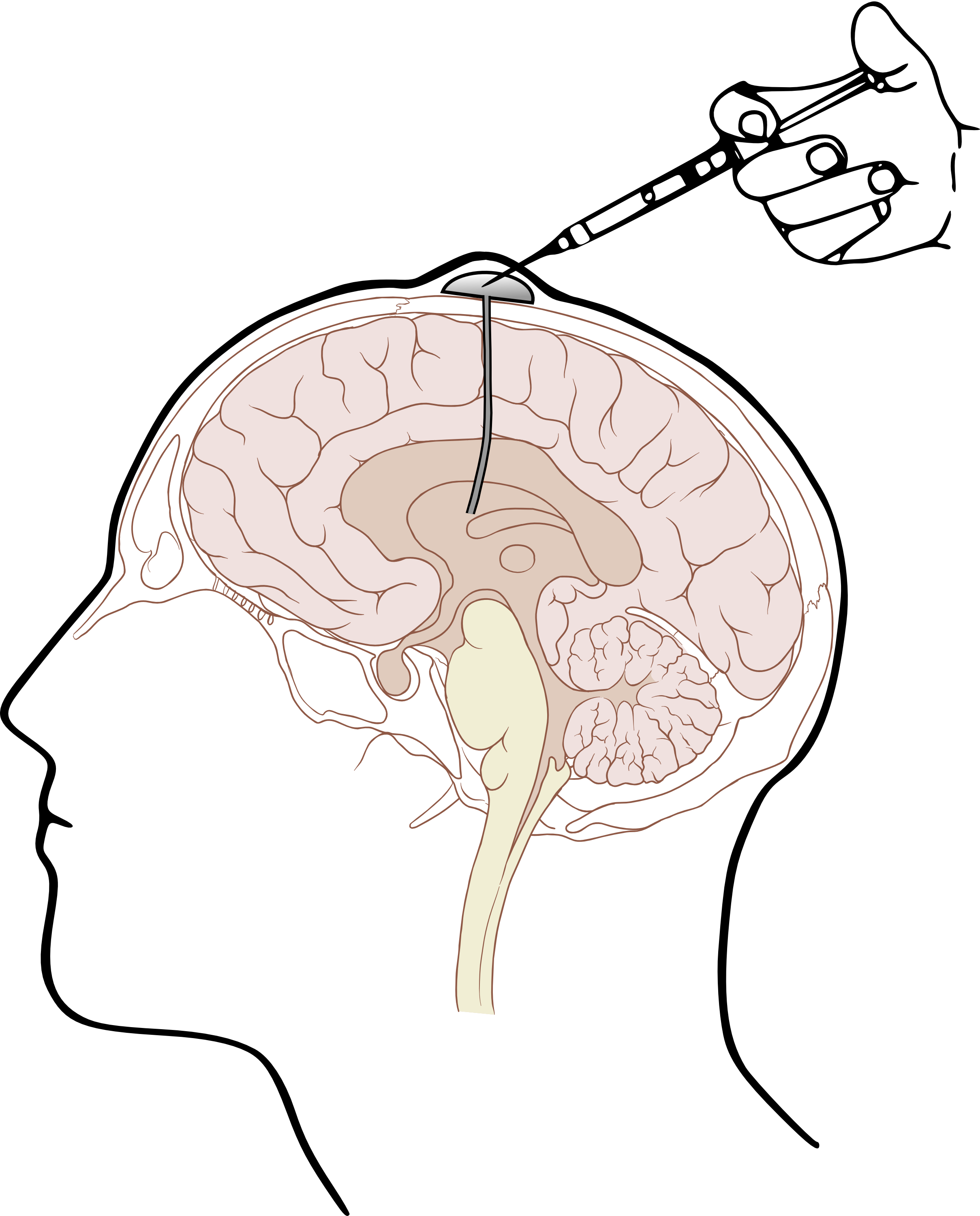
Schematic representation of an implanted Ommaya reservoir.

- The Ommaya reservoir - a system for the delivery of drugs (e.g. chemotherapy) into the cerebrospinal fluid for treatment of patients with brain tumours - was developed by Ayub K. Ommaya, a Pakistani neurosurgeon.
- A non-invasive technology for monitoring intracranial pressure (ICP) - developed by Faisal Kashif.

== Computing ==
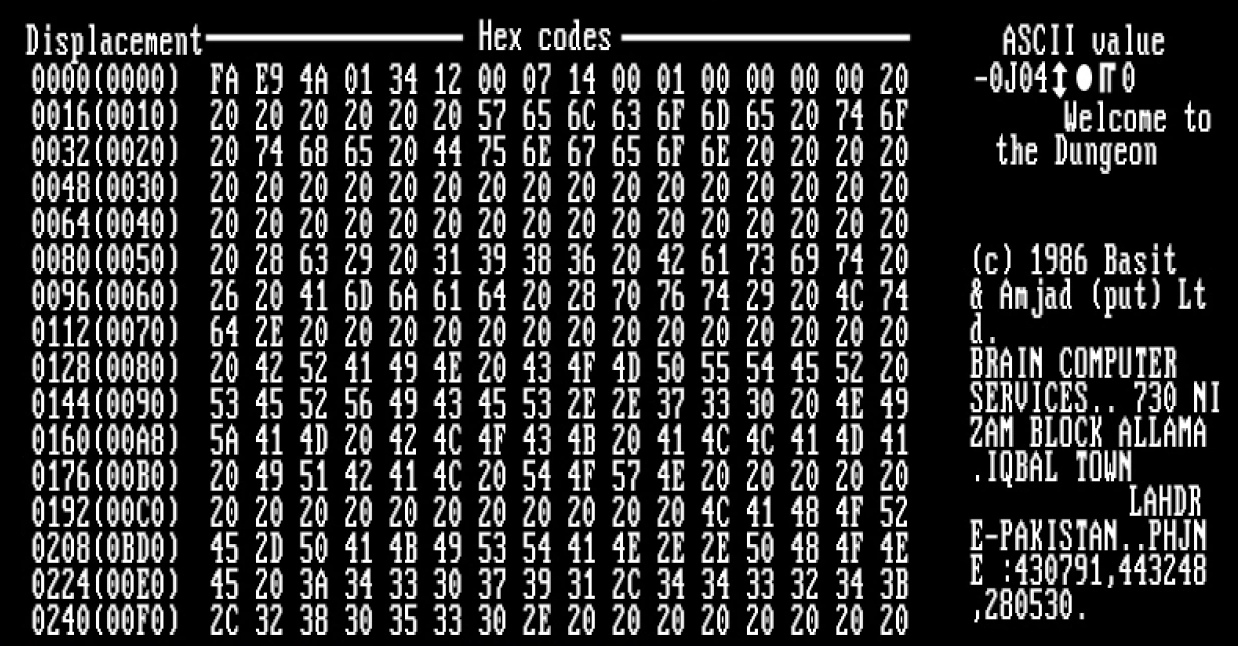
The boot sector of an infected floppy.

- A boot sector computer virus dubbed (c)Brain, one of the first computer viruses in history, was created in 1986 by the Farooq Alvi Brothers in Lahore, Pakistan, reportedly to deter unauthorized copying of the software they had written.
- Pakistani-Canadian inventor Naweed Syed invented the first Neurochip.

== Music ==
- The Sagar veena, a string instrument designed for use in classical music, was developed entirely in Pakistan over the last 40 years at the Sanjannagar Institute in Lahore by Raza Kazim.

== Economics ==
- The Human Development Index was devised by Pakistani economist Mahbub ul Haq in 1990 and had the explicit purpose "to shift the focus of development economics from national income accounting to people centered policies".

== Software Engineering ==
- Umar Saif created an early epidemic detection system during the 2011 dengue outbreak in Pakistan. This helped government officials predict outbreaks before they were going to happen using complex algorithms, and data regarding stagnant water bodies where dengue larvae breed. Government officials could clear the larvae before they could infect people in some cases.

== See also ==
- Category:Pakistani inventors
- Science and technology in Pakistan
- List of inventions and discoveries of the Indus Valley Civilization, of the Bronze Age culture that flourished from 3300 to 1300 BCE in what is now Pakistan and India
- List of Indian inventions and discoveries, covers inventions made in the Indian subcontinent
