= E-Rozgaar Program =

Punjabi Government young graduate project

e-Rozgaar Program
- ای روزگار
- Formation: March 2017; 9 years ago
- Founded at: Lahore, Pakistan
- Type: Government Organization
- Purpose: Empower youth of Punjab with digital skills and freelancing to make them able to earn online
- Headquarters: Arfa Software Technology Park
- Location: Punjab, Pakistan
- Website: www.erozgaar.pitb.gov.pk

e-Rozgaar Program is flagship project of Youth Affairs & Sports Department, Government of Punjab and Punjab Information Technology Board (PITB) which provides training to young graduates of Punjab province in digital skills and freelancing. e-Rozgaar Program offers courses like Technical (programming and tech), Content Marketing & Advertising, Creative Designing, E-Commerce, Mobile App Development, Digital & Social Media Marketing, and UI/UX Design while freelancing is taught will all courses.

== History ==
e-Rozgaar Training Program was inaugurated by Chief Minister Punjab, Shahbaz Sharif on March 28, 2017. As stated by Chairman PITB Umar Saif during launch, 40 training centers in 36 districts of Punjab will be established for the purpose to produce 10,000 freelancers per month to increase the foreign remittances in Pakistan under this project

== See also ==
- National Freelance Training Program (NFTP)
