= Eden Centre =

Eden Centre may refer to:

- Eden Shopping Centre, a shopping centre in High Wycombe, England
- Eden Centre, a tall building in Lahore, India

== See also ==
- Eden Project, a visitor attraction in Cornwall, England
