= NFTP =

NFTP may refer to:

- Niuatoputapu Airport, Tonga, ICAO airfield code NFTP
- National Freelance Training Program, online training program in Pakistan
