= Arfa Software Technology Park =

Building and technology park in Lahore, Pakistan

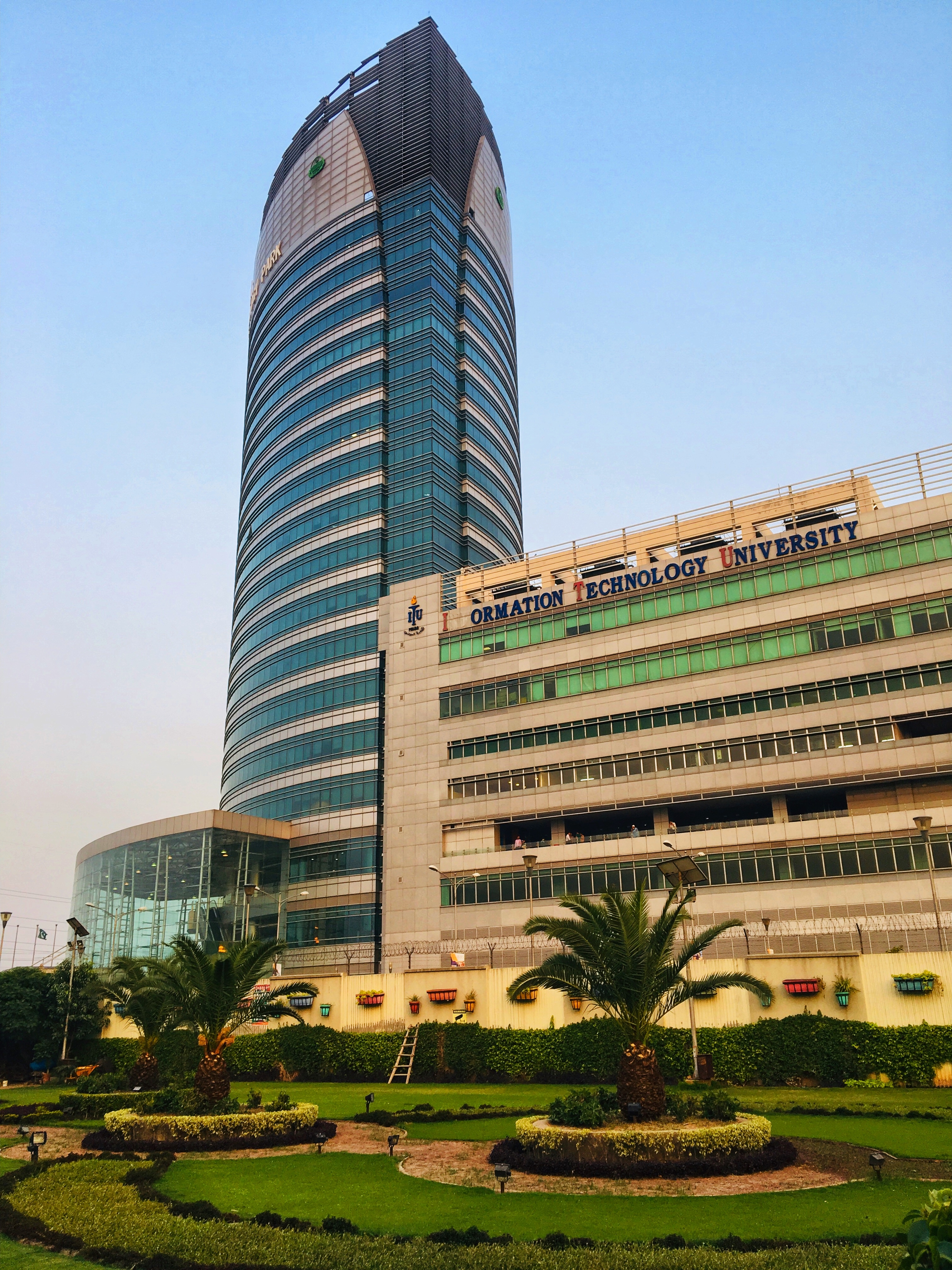
- Arfa Software Technology Park
- Interactive map of the Arfa Software Technology Park area
- Alternative names: Software Technology Park

General information
- Status: Completed
- Location: 346-B, Ferozepur Road, Lahore, Pakistan
- Coordinates: 31.475357°N 74.343064°E
- Groundbreaking: 3 July 2006
- Inaugurated: 9 February 2012
- Owner: Punjab Information Technology Board

Height
- Height: 106 m (348 ft)

Technical details
- Floor count: 17

Website
- Arfa Software Technology Park

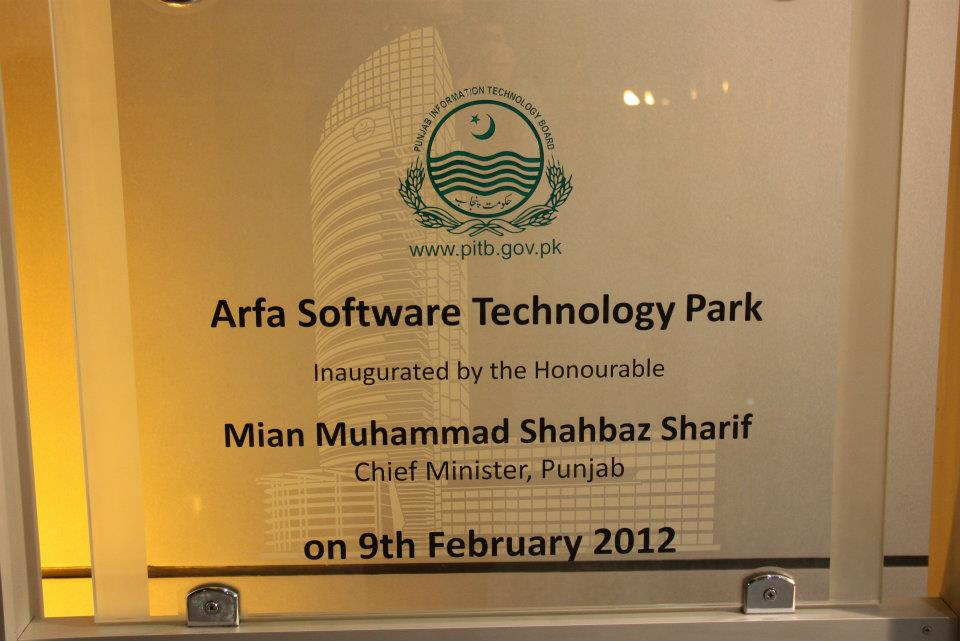
Inauguration plaque at Arfa Software Technology Park, 9 February 2012.

Arfa Software Technology Park (previously known as Software Technology Park) is a building and information technology park at Ferozepur Road, Lahore, Pakistan. Built in 2009, it is home to the Information Technology University and PITB. The main building consists of 17 floors and, at 106 metres (348 ft) tall, is currently the tallest building in Lahore.

On 15 January 2012, Chief Minister of Punjab Mian Shahbaz Sharif announced a name change of Software Technology Park to Arfa Software Technology Park after the youngest Microsoft Certified Professional Arfa Karim, who died at the age of 16.

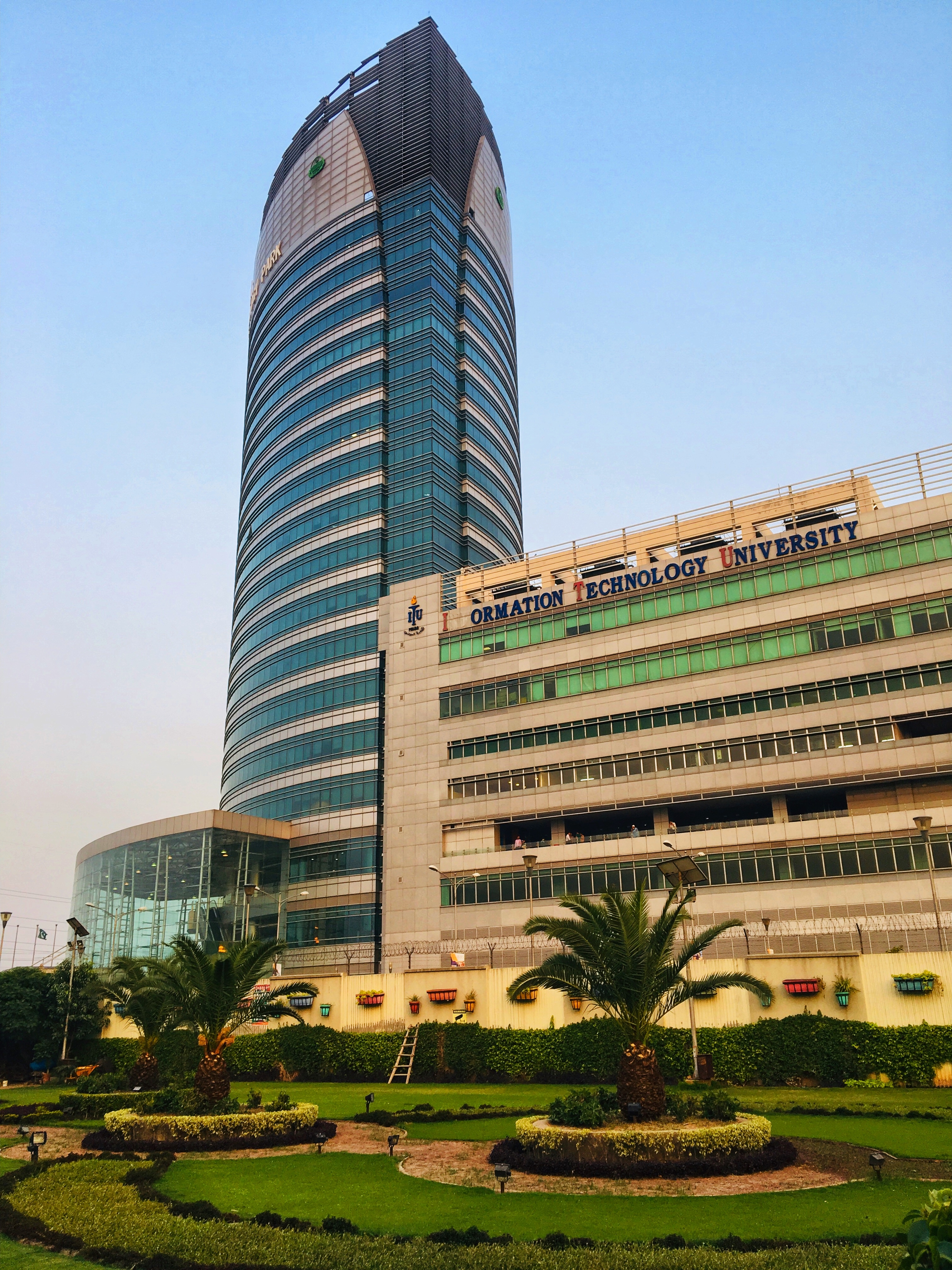

== See also ==
- List of tallest buildings in Pakistan
- List of parks and gardens in Lahore
- List of parks and gardens in Pakistan
