= Pakistan Railways Police =

Law enforcement agency within the jurisdiction of Pakistan Railways

- Common name: Railways Police
- Abbreviation: PRP

Agency overview
- Formed: 1977

Jurisdictional structure
- Operations jurisdiction: Pakistan
- Legal jurisdiction: Pakistan Railways
- Constituting instrument: Pakistan Railways Police Act, 1977
- General nature: Civilian police

Operational structure
- Overseen by Federal Ministry: Ministry of Railways (Pakistan)
- Headquarters: Lahore, Pakistan
- Agency executives: Muhammad Tahir Rai, Inspector General

Facilities
- Stations: 49

Website
- www.pakrailwayspolice.gov.pk

The Pakistan Railways Police is a federal law enforcement agency in Pakistan that is responsible for maintaining law and order within the jurisdiction of Pakistan Railways.

== History ==
The Pakistan Railways Police was founded according to the Pakistan Railways Police Act, 1977, which outlines the formation and governance of this law enforcement agency. The act along with the accompanying Rules, 1980, grant authority to the Chief Executive and the Inspector General, and these regulations are relevant to the employees within the Pakistan Railways Police, who are considered civil servants.

In February 2022, a decision was made by the government to enhance the pay scale of Pakistan Railways police personnel. This decision was unprecedented in the nation's history and was driven by the goal of reducing discrepancies in pay among officials from various departments and fostering a sense of professionalism within the Pakistan Railways police department.

== Achievements and initiatives ==
=== Digital Transformation ===
In the beginning of 2023, the Pakistan Railways Police initiated a digital transformation. Key police stations nationwide have implemented a digital system with support from the Punjab Information Technology Board (PITB). This endeavor is aimed at modernizing the work environment and enhancing service provision.

=== Advanced control room ===
In July 2023, Rao Sardar Ali Khan, the Inspector General of Pakistan Railways Police, officially opened a state-of-the-art control center at the Central Police Office Railways in Lahore. This control room is a vital component of the technology-driven efforts and encompasses various areas such as the Criminal Record Office (CRO), Criminal Record Management System (CRMS), Police Station Record Management System (PSRMS), Wireless Control, CCTV monitoring, and Social Media.

== e-Police mobile app ==
In December 2022 the Pakistan Railways Police introduced a contemporary E-Police mobile app for easy access to criminal records. This application was created in collaboration with the Punjab Information Technology Board (PITB) and linked to criminal records from various police services, such as the Punjab Police and Sindh Police.

== Crime prevention ==
The Pakistan Railways Police apprehended approximately 3,720 individuals for breaking rules and laws. They filed about 3,454 cases against them in a year across eight Railways divisions.

== Inspector Generals ==
- Muhammad Tahir Rai (21-02-2025 to Till Date)
- Rao Sardar Ali Khan (23-07-2022 to 20-02-2025)
- Faisal Shahkar (29-10-2021 to 23–07–2022)
- Inam Ghani (08-09-2021 to 29–10–2021)
- Arif Nawaz Khan (16-04-2020 to 27–08–2021)
- Mushtaq Ahmad Mehr (04-12-2019 to 29–02–2020)
- Wajid Zai (24-12-2018 to 30–11–2019)
- Dr. Mujeeb ur Rehman (15-09-2017 to 24–12–2018)
- Munir Ahmad Chisti (28-08-2014 to 30–07–2017)
- Syed Ibne Hussain (18-04-2011 to 27 -08-2014)
- M. Ali Mirza (01-07-2008 to 02–01–2009)
- Syed Asghar Raza Garadzi (02-01-2009 to 05–04–2011)
- Maj. R Mian Zaheer Ahmad (28-01-2006 to 15–11–2007)
- Asif Nawaz (26-11-2007 to 07–07–2008)
- Ahmad Naseem (12-12-2002 to 20–07–2005)
- Jahangeer Mirza (21-07-2005 to 30–12–2005)
- M. R. Zia (08-11-1999 to 23–07–2001)
- Shahid Hassan Quershi (23-07-2001 to 12–11–2002)
- Khalid Masud (02-12-1998 to 08–11–1999)
- M. Habib Khan (04-08-1998 to 28–11–1998)
- Ch. M. Amin (12-04-1997 to 01–08–1998)
- G Asghar Malik (11-11-1996 to 10–04–1997)
- Khawar Zaman (01-06-1994 to 11–11–1996)
- Nisaar Ahmad Cheema (03-01-1990 to 31–05–1994)
- Laiq Ahmad Khan (01-09-1986 to 07–01–1990)
- Arbab Mukhtair Ahmad (13-11-83 to 30–06–1986)
- M. M. Hassan (30-10-1977 to 03–11–1983)
- Sheikh Sageer Hussain (25-10-1976 to 30–10–1977)
