= Muhammad Tahir Rai =

Pakistani police officer

- رائے محمد طاہر

National Coordinator National Counter Terrorism Authority
- In office 29 July 2022 – 29 Aug 2024

Director General Federal Investigation Agency
- In office 20 April 2022 – 29 July 2022

Inspector General Balochistan Police
- In office 23 January 2021 – 28 February 2022

Director General of National Police Bureau (NPB)
- In office 15 May 2023 – 07 June 2023

Inspector General Pakistan Railways Police
- In office 21 Feb 2025 – 03 Feb 2026

Personal details
- Born: 2 February 1966 (age 60)
- Awards: Hilal-i-Shujaat, Sitara-i-Imtiaz
- Nickname: Rai Tahir

Military service
- Allegiance: Pakistan
- Rank: Inspector General Of Police Pakistan
- Unit: Police Services of Pakistan

Muhammad Tahir Rai, Hilal-i-Shujaat (Urdu: محمد طاہر رائے) is a retired Pakistani civil servant and police officer who served as the Inspector General Pakistan Railways Police from 21 February 2025 to 03 February 2026. Tahir has also served as the National Coordinator of the National Counter Terrorism Authority (NACTA), as Inspector General of Balochistan Police, and Director General of the Federal Investigation Agency.
