= Punjab Safe Cities Authority =

Government body in Punjab, Pakistan

Punjab Safe Cities Authority (PSCA)

Government agency overview
- Formed: 25 August 2015; 11 years ago
- Type: Punjab Police (Pakistan)
- Jurisdiction: Lahore, Multan, Faisalabad, Rawalpindi, Gujranwala, Bahawalpur, Sargodha - (Punjab, Pakistan)
- Headquarters: Lahore, Pakistan
- Motto: Beginning of a New Police Culture
- Employees: 1,200
- Government agency executives: Rao Sardar Ali Khan, Managing Director in 2020. Appointed Managing Director in 2020; Akbar Nasir Khan Chief Operating Officer in 2019. Appointed Chief Operating Officer in 2015
- Parent department: Government of Punjab, Pakistan
- Website: www.psca.gop.pk

The Punjab Safe Cities Authority (PSCA) (Urdu: پنجاب سیف سٹیز اتھارٹی ), established in 2015, is an autonomous government body that aims to improve public safety and security in Punjab, Pakistan. It is currently functioning in 7 major cities of Punjab: Lahore, Multan, Faisalabad, Rawalpindi, Gujranwala, Bahawalpur, and Sargodha. The main goal of the PSCA is to develop and maintain an integrated command, control, and communications (IC3) system throughout Punjab's major cities. Over 10,000 closed-circuit television cameras have been installed in Lahore, with plans to establish similar surveillance systems in the other 6 cities under the PSCA's jurisdiction.

== Integration of Safety and Security Administration Systems ==
In earlier security administration systems in Pakistan, separate offices and specialists were responsible for managing situations such as traffic congestion, urban violence, and natural disasters like floods and earthquakes. However, this system lacked a unified structure for crisis management. To address this, the Punjab Safe Cities Authority (PSCA) adopted the use of surveillance technologies for crisis response.

The PSCA functions as a central hub for data collection and dissemination, and serves as a platform for addressing a variety of urban security challenges, which are typically managed by central authorities. The "Safe City" concept is widely regarded as a comprehensive approach to improving public safety through integrated solutions.

This system allows various agencies and their respective technologies to coordinate and collaborate, boosting the efficiency of policing and urban management. Benefits include reduced emergency response times, faster service delivery, monitoring of potential security threats at important locations, resolution of traffic congestion, and effective management of crowds and civil disturbances.

== Establishment of the PSCA ==
To address the evolving security challenges of modern urban environments, the Government of Punjab established the Punjab Safe Cities Authority (PSCA) as an autonomous body under the Punjab Safe Cities Ordinance, 2015. The primary mandate of the Authority is to design, implement, and maintain the Integrated Command, Control, and Communication Program (IC3) across the province.

The ordinance was formally drafted and enacted on 7 July 2015, outlining the legal and operational framework for the Authority. It also provided for the appointment of a governing body, including a full-time Managing Director, to oversee the execution and administration of PSCA's strategic objectives. This organizational structure was created to ensure efficient, technology-driven, and coordinated public safety initiatives throughout Punjab..

=== The Working Model of Safe City Centre ===
The vision of the PSCA is to make an Integrated Command, Control, and Communication Program (IC3) that gathers and disseminates data and information about urban security from various sources. Some examples are government offices, executives of traffic management, intelligence agencies and other private and public entities. It utilizes this collected data to grow progressively successful and effective reactions to any sort of security risk. Utilizing cutting-edge technology, video surveillance and communication systems, it manages a variety of security threats progressively. Aside from upgrading the capacity to react rapidly to a crisis circumstance, it diminishes the pressure on the state and its assets as data is stored centrally and activities are coordinated through a central authority. The Safe City speaks to policing with the capability of cutting-edge innovations, and improves the ability of law administration groups to make urban environments safe.

== E-challan system ==
The PSCA launched an electronic ticketing system in Lahore on the directives of the Lahore High Court. This system, with the help of modern Automatic Vehicle Number Plate Recognition (ANPR) cameras, identifies the violators of traffic rules, which the PSCA installed across Lahore. The e-challan is sent to the violators' addresses registered against their vehicle IDs, containing the information along with pictorial evidence regarding how the driver violated traffic rules. Later on, the PSCA also launched an online portal for the citizens to check e-challan by giving vehicle registration number and CNIC.
