= Information Technology University =

Public university in Lahore, Pakistan

- جامعہ اطلاعیات
- Motto: Innovation
- Type: Public
- Established: 2012
- Affiliations: Higher Education Commission (Pakistan), Pakistan Engineering Council, National Computing Education Accreditation Council
- Endowment: $10 million
- Chancellor: Governor of the Punjab
- Vice-Chancellor: Adnan Noor Mian
- Students: 1500
- Location: Lahore, Punjab, Pakistan
- Campus: Urban
- Website: itu.edu.pk

The Information Technology University (ITU) (Urdu: جامعہ اطلاعیات) is a public university in Lahore, Punjab, Pakistan. Founded in 2012, the university was founded and headed by Umar Saif and is modeled after the MIT.

The university has two campuses. Its main campus on Barki Road, covering 74 ha (183 acres), is still under construction but operational, with classes held there and three departments relocated as of August 2024. The City Campus is located in the high-rise Arfa Software Technology Park. The university has varying degrees of partnerships with the Harvard University and also publishes the MIT Technology Review, Pakistan edition. The university is home to several tenured academics, Pakistan's largest startup incubator and maintains partnerships with EdX, IBM and the US State Department. It hosted International Development Design Summit, organised by IDIN and United States Agency for International Development (USAID).

== History ==
=== Foundation ===
ITU, located in Lahore, was founded in 2012.

== Faculty ==
The university was formerly led by Umar Saif (PhD from University of Cambridge) who has previously taught at the Cambridge–MIT Institute. Dr. Sarfraz Khurshid (PhD from MIT) was the second Vice Chancellor of the University. Prof. Dr. Adnan Noor Mian (PostDoc from University of Cambridge) is the current Vice Chancellor of the University.

It has four faculties:

- Faculty of Humanities and Social Sciences
- Faculty of Business and Management Sciences
- Faculty of Sciences
- Faculty of Engineering

== Offered Degrees ==
The university currently offers the following degrees:

- BS Economics with Data Science
- BS Management and Technology
- BS Financial Technology
- BS Computer Engineering
- BS Electrical Engineering
- BS Computer Science
- Executive MBA (EMBA)
- MS Public Policy and Society
- MS Management and Technology
- MS Development Studies: DEVELOPMENT, TECHNOLOGY AND POLICY
- MS Data Science
- MS Electrical Engineering
- MS Computer Science
- MS Cyber Security
- PhD Computer Science
- PhD Electrical Engineering

== Research ==
ITU is home to several research centers and labs:

- Center for Technology and Governance (CTG)
- Technology and Research in Emerging Networks and Distributed Systems (TRENDS)
- Neighborhood for Emerging World Technologies (NEWT)
- Abdus Salam International Center of Mathematics
- Center For Speech and Language Technologies
- National Centre For Academic Integrity
- Bio-Inspired Simulation & Modelling of Intelligent Life
- Embedded Computing Laboratory
- Scientometrics Lab
- Data Science Lab
- Business Analytics Lab
- Vision Processing Lab
- Innovations for Poverty Alleviation Lab (IPAL)

Between 2013 and 2016 the university has conducted PKR 700 million (approx. US$7 million) in research in science, technology, engineering and mathematics (STEM). It has received research funding from Higher Education Commission (Pakistan), Government of the Punjab, Deutsche Gesellschaft für Internationale Zusammenarbeit (GIZ), World Bank and Department for International Development (DfID).

== First Convocation ==
The university's first convocation was held on December 17, 2017. The university awarded its first Honorary Doctorate Degree awarded to Dr. Adil Najam, the inaugural Dean of the Frederick S. Pardee School of Global Studies at Boston University, and former Vice Chancellor of the Lahore University of Management Sciences (LUMS). 139 students of Computer Science and Electrical Engineering graduated in the first convocation.

== Lahore Technology Award ==
ITU gave Lahore Technology Award at its first convocation to the Massachusetts Institute of Technology’s Nergis Mavalvala for her work in the gravitational theory.
