= Non-invasive measurement of intracranial pressure =

Non-invasive intracranial pressure measurement methods
- Purpose: measure ICP

Increased intracranial pressure (ICP) is one of the major causes of secondary brain ischemia that accompanies a variety of pathological conditions, most notably traumatic brain injury (TBI), strokes, and intracranial hemorrhages. It can cause complications such as vision impairment due to intracranial pressure (VIIP), permanent neurological problems, reversible neurological problems, seizures, stroke, and death. However, aside from a few Level I trauma centers, ICP monitoring is rarely a part of the clinical management of patients with these conditions. The infrequency of ICP can be attributed to the invasive nature of the standard monitoring methods (which require insertion of an ICP sensor into the brain ventricle or parenchymal tissue). Additional risks presented to patients can include high costs associated with an ICP sensor's implantation procedure, and the limited access to trained personnel, e.g. a neurosurgeon. Alternative, non-invasive measurement of intracranial pressure, non-invasive methods for estimating ICP have, as a result, been sought.

== Correlation-based approaches ==
Many approaches to non-invasive ICP estimation are based on the idea that something in the human head's anatomical structure or in the intracranial and extracranial physiology correlates with ICP. "Correlation-based" approaches can reflect factors associated with ICP only with limited accuracy (expressed by systematic error) and precision (expressed by the standard deviation of random error). Measuring absolute ICP value is limited by the need for individual patient-specific calibration.

Absolute ICP values in mmHg or other units are needed to determine the correct patient treatment. The only accurate, precise, and patient-specific, calibration-free, non-invasive, absolute ICP value measurement method relies not on the correlation, but on direct ICP and extracranial pressure comparison principle.

== Two depth transorbital doppler (TDTD) ==
An innovative method using a two-depth transorbital doppler (TDTD) of intracranial pressure quantitative absolute (ICP) value measurement relies on the same fundamental principle that is used to measure blood pressure with a sphygmomanometer. A sphygmomanometer works using a pressure balance principle - an air-filled pressure cuff wrapped around the arm compresses the brachial artery to a point where blood can no longer flow. Externally applied pressure is equal to systolic blood pressure in this case. The examiner slowly releases the air from the cuff and uses a stethoscope to listen for the return of blood flow. At the pressure balance point, where the pressure in the cuff equals systolic artery pressure, a ‘whooshing’ noise can be heard as blood flows through the artery again. Pressure balance based a non-invasive blood pressure meter does not need a patient-specific calibration.

The TDTD method uses Doppler ultrasound to translate the pressure balance principle of blood pressure measurement with a sphygmomanometer to the measurement of ICP. The ophthalmic artery (OA), a unique vessel with intracranial and extracranial segments, is used as a pressure sensor and as a natural pair of scales for absolute ICP value in mmHg or mmH2O measurement. Blood flow in the intracranial OA segment is affected by intracranial pressure, while flow in the extracranial (intraorbital) OA segment is influenced by the externally applied pressure (Pe) to the eyeball and orbital tissues.

As with a sphygmomanometer, a special pressure cuff is used - in this case, to compress the tissues surrounding the eyeball and also intraorbital tissues surrounding the extracranial segment of OA. External pressure changes the characteristics of blood flowing from inside the skull cavity into the eye socket. In place of the stethoscope, a Doppler ultrasound beam measures the blood flow pulsations in intracranial and extracranial segments of the ophthalmic artery. The non-invasive ICP meter based on this method gradually increases the pressure over the eyeball and intraorbital tissues so that the blood flow pulsation parameters in two sections of the OA are equal. At this pressure balance point, the applied external pressure (Pe) equals the intracranial pressure (ICP).

This measurement method eliminates the main limiting problem of all other non-successful approaches to non-invasive ICP measurement, primarily the individual patient calibration problem. Direct comparison of arterial blood pressure (ABP) and externally applied pressure is the basic arterial blood pressure measurement principle, which eliminates the need for individual calibration. The same calibration-free fundamental principle is used in the TDTD non-invasive ICP absolute value measurement method.

The mean value of OA blood flow, its systolic and diastolic values, pulsatility and other indexes are almost the same in both OA segments in the point of balance when ICP equals Pe. As a result of that, all individual influential factors (ABP, cerebrovascular auto-regulation impairment, individual pathophysiological state of patience, individual diameter, and anatomy of OA, hydrodynamic resistance of eyeball vessels, etc.) do not influence the balance of ICP equaling Pe and, as a consequence, such natural “scales” do not need calibration.

Ragauskas A. et al. have already published the statistically significant results of a prospective clinical study on assessment of the accuracy and precision of proposed non-invasive absolute ICP value measurement method. The study shows that proposed method is the only quantitative noninvasive ICP absolute value (mmHg) measurement method which does not need an individual patient-specific calibration. High accuracy, precision, sensitivity and specificity of the proposed method are fully acceptable for clinical practice and for very wide applications in neurology, transplantology, intensive care, sports medicine, aerospace medicine, and combat casualty care.

This method was further developed by the Company Vittamed Ltd along with consortium partners in EU FP7 projects BrainSafe Brainsafe, Brainsafe II, and TBIcare.

== Ultrasound time of the flight techniques ==
The majority of patented methods for noninvasive monitoring of ICP are based on an assumption that changes in ICP affect the physical dimensions and/or acoustic properties of the cranial vault or intracranial structures (dura, brain tissue, brain ventricles, and/or intracranial vessels). The common drawback of all these methods is that they measure only relative changes of ICP as referenced to a baseline measurement during which absolute ICP is known, i.e. the ultrasound readouts need to be calibrated on each subject against an invasive measurement. Ultrasound ‘time of the flight’ methods for non-invasive ICP monitoring have not been extensively validated and currently, the majority of them do not seem to be accurate enough for a routine clinical use. Their original formulations usually do not specify locations for the transducer's placement and do not address how the intentional or accidental use of different locations and/or angles of the transducers will affect the reliability of ICP estimates. It has also remained unexplored how the measurements are affected by the presence of intracranial pathological masses on the path of the ultrasound wave, or by brain masses shifts.

=== Cranium diameter ===
Dimensions of the cranium or its structures are determined with the ultrasound “time-of-the-flight” technique that measures the transit time of an ultrasound wave and its (potentially multiple) echoes on their path through the cranium and calculates the corresponding distance(s) using known ultrasound propagation velocities in different tissues (e.g. bone, brain, or fluid). Unfortunately, a reproducible quantitative relationship between the diameter of the cranium and ICP could not be established because ICP-induced changes in the cranium diameter are very small compared to the inter-individual variability of skull sizes, shapes and thicknesses.

=== Thickness of the dura ===
The method claims that ICP can be inferred from the thickness of the dura mater that is estimated from interference echoes of an ultrasonic wave. The utility of the method was successfully confirmed on four healthy subjects and four patients with intracranial hypertension, but larger validation studies have never been conducted as the method failed to attract enough interest among clinicians. This method also needs a calibration to the individual patients.

==== Cerebral ventricle ====
Michaeli proposed that ICP should be inferred from the magnitude and shape of pulsations of the third ventricle synchronous with the cardiac cycle or respiration, where the pulsations are measured along the propagation axis of an ultrasound wave. The method so far has not been independently validated, and the author provides no exact data from which one could estimate the accuracy of the method. However, the discussion in the body of the patent document suggests that the method is able to distinguish among three ranges of ICP (<20, 20–40 and >40mmHg) but cannot provide an exact value of ICP within the range because of the impossibility of the calibration to the individual patient.

Method and device for non-invasive (NI) ICP measurement according to inventions of David Michaeli MD, PhD, based to the TRA (tissue resonance analysis) have 2 options: (1) The qualitative method makes an evaluation of mild (10-20mm.Hg), moderate (20-40) and severe (above 40mmHg) ICP elevation. These method is using NI, long-term recording of ICP waves patterns, Like Lundsbergs ICP waves. (2) Quantitative measurement OF ICP WAVES with special ICP formulation in mm.Hg., Developed new device and method for calibration of ICP for each patient; see patent description.

=== Brain parenchyma ===
More recently, multivariate methods have been proposed that derive ICP by combining the transit times with measured acoustic impedance, resonant frequency and ultrasound velocity, or with a dispersion of the ultrasound wave on its way through the brain parenchyma.

Ultrasound ICP monitors based on the latter approach, which were developed at Vittamed Technologijos (Kaunas, Lithuania), have shown an impressive agreement with invasively measured ICP, with an average difference of only 2–3 mmHg in a small clinical population. However Vittamed Technologijos time-of-flight technologies were developed further for other applications of neuro-monitoring technologies (including cerebral Autoregulation and Cerebral Compliance).

== Transcranial Doppler ultrasonography ==
The TCD measures the velocity of blood flow through the major intracranial vessels by emitting a high frequency (>2MHz) wave from an ultrasound probe and detecting a frequency shift between the incident and reflected wave which directly correlates with the speed of the blood (the so-called Doppler effect). The measurement is taken over the regions of the skull with thinner walls (temporal region, back of the head, or through the eye), as the bones strongly attenuate the transmission of the ultrasound at these frequencies. TCD is primarily a technique for diagnosing various intracranial vascular disorders such as emboli, stenosis, or vasospasm, and can be used to identify patients who are at risk of developing cerebral ischemia in early phases of traumatic brain injury or stroke.

ICP can be estimated from the TCD measurements because it impedes the blood flow and consequently decreases the velocity of blood flow. Besides the mean velocity, pulsatility index (which is the difference between peak systolic and end diastolic velocity, divided by mean flow velocity), a fraction of the cycle in systole and slopes of the TCD waveforms have been correlated with ICP. The estimates are however insufficiently accurate with the margin of error of ±10 - 15 mmHg.

Physiosonics, Inc. used transcranial Doppler ultrasound to measure ICP indirectly by assessing the elasticity of the biological material in a defined part of the brain. However, the elasticity in the brain is highly dependent on many other variable individual factors apart from ICP, including arterial blood pressure, state of cerebral blood flow auto-regulation, and the level of edema. Therefore, this approach would require calibration and expert positioning.

== Skull bones ==
Methods from this group attempt to derive ICP from mechanical properties of the skull bones rather than of the intracranial content. The underlying assumption is similar to that of the ultrasound time of the flight techniques: that the skull is not completely rigid so that changes in ICP result in a small but measurable skull expansion which creates additional stress within the skull bones and modifies their mechanical properties. The transfer function is derived by applying a wide-band, low frequency (<100 Hz) mechanical excitation at one location on the skull (via a piezo-transducer or an impact hammer) and comparing its spectrum to that of a signal received at another location on the upper half of skull. It is proposed that the measurement to be self-calibrated by obtaining the frequency response spectrum from a point on the base of the skull of the same subject, which is assumed not to be affected by ICP, or alternatively, pre-calibrated on subjects with normal ICP.

Other methods from this group vary this basic approach of Mick in different ways. In Sinha's method resonant frequency of the skull bones is determined first, then a sinusoidal excitation at the resonant frequency is delivered through a piezo-transducer, and ICP is calculated directly from the phase difference between the excitatory signal and response detected with a second transducer. Yost and Cantrell divided the process into two steps. In the first step, changes in the circumference of the cranium are calculated from the phase difference between a sinusoidal excitatory signal, delivered with a piezo-transducer, and the response that is received at a distance with another piezotransducer. In the second step, changes in ICP are calculated as a product of the changes in the cranium circumference and the elasticity constant of the skull that has been determined earlier by causing known changes in ICP while measuring the cranium circumference.

Luna Innovations Incorporated (NASDAQ: LUNA) developed EN-TACT system, an ultrasound device for monitoring compartment syndrome. The technology was claimed to have applications for raised intracranial pressure. Based on research from the NASA Ames research center, the company used ultrasound to measure skull diameter changes caused by ICP changes.

None of the aforementioned methods has been properly validated in relevant clinical populations, and their accuracy is unknown. One may assume however that it would be comparable to the ultrasound time-of-the-flight methods, and thus insufficient for a routine clinical use.

On the other hand, Mascarenhas et al. conducted a study using an empty skull with an attached strain gauge, where they induced variations in intracranial pressure (ICP) by inflating a balloon. They observed a linear correlation between micrometric skull bone expansion (measured in mV) and ICP, demonstrating that the Monro-Kellie doctrine was not applicable. As consequence of this research, a non-invasive system (brain4care, São Carlos, Brazil) was developed. This system was initially validated in living animal models and subsequently in patients with brain injuries. The system demonstrated a high-fidelity reproduction of ICP pulse slopes (ICP waveforms) by comparing noninvasive skull pulse waveforms with those obtained invasively through ventricular and parenchymal probes. The system is entirely noninvasive and safe, acquiring raw skull pulse waveform data and transmitting it to cloud-based processing. It returns real-time processed parameters, such as the P2/P1 ratio and time-to-peak, directly to clinicians. These parameters are correlated with intracranial compliance and, by extension, intracranial pressure. The brain4care system has been FDA cleared and is currently deployed in numerous healthcare facilities across Brazil and the United States, where it is used in the care and research of patients with various neurological and non-neurological conditions, regardless of disease severity.

== Tympanic membrane displacement ==
Tympanic membrane displacement (TMD) technique, proposed nearly twenty years ago by Marchbanks exploits the effect of intracranial pressure on the acoustic reflex, i.e. a reflex contraction of the stapedius and tensor tympani muscles in response to a sound. Normally, vibrations of the tympanic membrane (eardrum) elicited by acoustic stimuli are transmitted through the chain of ossicles (malleus, incus, and stapes) in the middle ear to the oval window of the cochlea. Vibrations of the footplate of stapes transmit through the oval window to the perilymph, which in turn causes the endolymph, the basilar membrane, and the organ of Corti to vibrate, activating ultimately the acoustic sensor cells, the inner hair cells of the organ of Corti. The transfer function of this complex mechanical system under physiological conditions is modulated by the action of two small muscles of the middle ear, the tensor tympani, and stapedius. The tensor tympani arises from the cartilaginous portion of the auditory tube and the osseous canal of the sphenoid and, having sharply bent over the extremity of the septum, attaches to the manubrium of the malleus (hammer); its contraction pulls the malleus medially, away from the tympanic membrane, which tenses the membrane. The stapedius, which emerges from the posterior wall of the tympanic cavity of the middle ear and inserts into the neck of the stapes (stirrup), prevents excess movements of the stapes by pulling it away from the oval window. The action of either muscle, therefore, dampens vibrations of the ossicles and reduces the amplitude of transmitted sounds for up to 20 dB. The muscles normally contract in response to vocalization, jawing and loud external sounds, which is accompanied by a small but measurable displacement of the eardrum from its initial position. Because cerebrospinal fluid and perilymph communicate through the cochlear aqueduct, an increase in intracranial pressure is directly transmitted to the footplate of the stapes, changing its initial position and affecting thereby the direction and magnitude of the displacement of the eardrum in response to a sound. The displacement can be measured with common tympanometers used for impedance audiometry that are portable and relatively inexpensive and easy to use (particularly the modern, computerized tympanometers with fully automated measurement procedure). Inward displacement (negative peak pressure on an audiogram) is suggestive of high, and outward of normal or low ICP. The direction and magnitude of TMD, however, depend not only on the initial position of stapes but also on numerous other factors that affect the acoustic impedance (integrity of the eardrum, condition of the ossicles, patency of the Eustachian tube, pressure and eventual presence of fluid or other masses in the middle ear) or the strength of the acoustic reflex (physiological variability of the reflex threshold, functional integrity of the cochlear and facial nerves, degree of eventual sensory hearing loss). In addition, the assumption that the pressure of perilymph is equal to ICP does not hold if the patency of the cochlear aqueduct is compromised, which is often the case in elderly subjects. Accuracy of TMD estimates of ICP was found to be at the order of ±15mmHg, which is not sufficient for a reliable quantitative assessment of ICP in clinical practice.

An interesting method that involves direct manipulations on the tympanic membrane rather than relying on the acoustic reflex was proposed as one of the embodiments of a US patent by Ragauskas. First, a measurement of the position of the tympanic membrane needs to be obtained while ICP is zero (denoted as the baseline position). Equalization of ICP to the atmospheric pressure according to the inventor can be achieved non-invasively by tilting the head up, or the measurement can be taken during a neurosurgical operation. Later on, ICP can be measured by exerting an external pressure to the tympanic membrane and applying simultaneously the same pressure onto the oval window and inner ear (e.g. through the Eustachian tube) until the eardrum is moved back to the baseline position, which will happen when the exerted external pressure equals ICP. No data is provided in the patent nor is available from other sources that could support the utility of the concept in clinical practice.

== Otoacoustic emission ==
TMD fails to provide accurate estimates of ICP mostly because the acoustic impedance and its changes due to the acoustic reflex are dominantly determined by the structures and functional properties of the middle ear, and only marginally influenced by changes in ICP. A measurable acoustic phenomenon that originates in the inner ear would, at least in theory, allow for more precise assessment of the pressure of the peri- and endo-lymph, and consequently, of ICP. Otoacoustic emission (OAE), which is a sound generated by subtle oscillations of the endo- and perilymph caused by contractions of the outer hair cells of the inner ear in response to a loud sound, seems to offer such a possibility. The sound is transmitted to the stapes, and further through the ossicles, to the tympanic membrane from which it can be detected with a sensitive microphone inserted into the ear canal. OAE is used in clinical practice to test for hearing deficits in babies and children who are too young to cooperate. The equipment can be made portable and is relatively easy to use. Two approaches have commonly utilized that increase the unfavorable signal-to-noise ratio and facilitate extraction of the OAE waveform: transient evoked otoacoustic emission (TEOAE) and distortion product otoacoustic emission (DPOAE). In a recent US patent issued to Meyerson and colleagues proposed the use of both the TEOAE and DPOAE for measurement of ICP. TEOAE is used first to determine the optimum OAE response frequency, after which the pair of pure tones is deployed in a DPOAE paradigm such that the cubic distortion product frequency equals the optimum response frequency while the ratio of frequencies f2/f1 is set to 5:4, and of intensities I2/I1 to 6:5. The inventors also proposed formulae that relate ICP to the intensity or phase of the measured OAE signal, and described how the other physiological signals or behaviors that are known to affect ICP such as small oscillations of ICP with each heartbeat, respiration, or posture changes, can be used to confirm the validity of the obtained measurements (e.g. the absence of modulation of the measured OAE phase with respiration may indicate occlusion of the cochlear aqueduct, in which case OAE cannot provide any information about ICP). There is little data up to date about the clinical utility or accuracy of otoacoustic emission as a measure of ICP. A pilot study of Frank and colleagues that evaluated different modalities of OAE in 12 healthy volunteers and 5 patients with implanted ventricular catheters for direct ICP monitoring revealed that increased ICP or conditions known to increase ICP (e.g. posture changes, abdomen compression, coughing) were associated with notable decreases (between -2.1 and -7.9SPL) in intensity of the evoked OAE. All results were however reported only as group averages, and no attempt was made to derive a quantitative one-to-one relation between the OAE intensity and ICP. This method as all other correlation-based approaches cannot be used for absolute ICP value measurement because of the impossibility of individual calibration.

== Ocular measurements ==
Eye provides another possible window into the pressure changes in the intracranial compartment thanks to the fact that the space between the optic nerve and its sheath is a continuation of the subarachnoid space, and is consequently filled with cerebrospinal fluid whose pressure is equal to intracranial pressure. Intracranial hypertension will thus manifest in an increased diameter of the optic nerve sheath and will impede the blood flow through the central retinal vein that courses within the sheath, along and in part inside of the optical nerve. The impediment of venous return causes visible changes in the eye fundus (venous engorgement, and papilledema, i.e. swelling and elevation of the optic nerve disc) that can be observed with an ophthalmoscope and have therefore been used by clinicians for more than a century as signs of increased ICP. Quantitative assessment of ICP can be made noninvasively in two different ways: by measuring changes in diameter of the optic nerve sheath with an appropriate technique (ultrasound or MRI), or by using ophthalmodynamometry to determine the pressure in the central retinal vein, which is normally slightly higher (1- 2mmHg) than ICP. Intracranial hypertension also induces changes at the cellular or axonal level such as the swelling of the fibers of the optic nerve that form the innermost layer of the retina (so-called nerve fiber layer – NFL). The information provided by the classic ophthalmoscopy is however only qualitative and may be inconclusive during early phases of intracranial hypertension since it usually takes between two and four hours from the onset of ICP elevation for a papilledema to develop.

A patented method that utilizes optical coherence tomography to measure the thickness of the nerve fiber layer and infers ICP from it laid claims of being able to detect the IH-induced thickening of the retina shortly after the onset of IH, but there has been no data that would support the claims or clarify the relationship between the NFL thickness and levels of ICP.

=== Optic nerve sheath diameter ===
The use of optic nerve sheath diameter (ONSD) for the assessment of ICP dates back to 1987 when Cennamo and colleagues demonstrated a linear relationship between ICP and the sheath diameter measured with a trans-orbital ultrasound probe in an A-scan mode (principally equivalent to the time-of-the-flight measurements of the cranium diameter). The original measurement method was technically difficult and unreliable because of the nearly coaxial alignment of the optic nerve and propagation axis of the ultrasound wave, but the precision was significantly improved with the use of B-scan (or planar) ultrasound which provided longitudinal cross-section images of the optic nerve and its sheath. Since then, the method has been successfully validated in several relatively large studies that included patients with severe head trauma, hydrocephalus, intracranial hemorrhage or stroke, liver failure, and climbers with acute mountain sickness. While the ONSD can at any given point along the optic nerve be measured with a precision of <1mm, the reliability of derived ICP levels is plagued by inter-individual variability and the dependence of ONSD magnitude on the point along the nerve at which the measurement was taken. Almost all validation studies so far have recommended that ONSD to be used for identification of patients with intracranial hypertension that requires treatment (ICP>20mmHg, i.e. ONSD>5mmHg) rather than for a measurement of ICP.

ONSD measurement by ultrasound is not as precise as invasive ICP measurement but may be useful if invasive measurement is not available.

=== Ophthalmodynamometry or the measurement of the retinal venous outflow pressure (VOP) ===
Performed by applying external pressure on the sclera, for example with a spring plunger, while observing the retinal vessels through an ophthalmoscope. The pressure is gradually increased until the central retinal vein begins to pulsate, which happens at the point when the applied external pressure nears the VOP and is approximately equal to ICP. The original method was described in 1925 by Baurmann and belongs to the public domain, but several modifications have been recently patented that combine the classic ophthalmodynamometry with reflectance oximetry of the retina or ultrasound measurement of blood flow in the central retinal artery, or automate the method by adding a camera and an image processing software capable of recognizing venous pulsations from a sequence of images of the eye fundus. Evaluation in patients confirmed a strong linear relationship and clinically negligible differences (2-3mmHg) between VOP and the invasively measured ICP. Ophthalmodynamometry requires dilated pupils, a skilled physician or medic, and collaboration of the patient, which all hampers its applicability in the field. It cannot be applied in cases of ocular trauma or conditions that selectively affect the optic nerve and gives erroneously high readings in the presence of a papilledema, which may persist long after ICP has returned to normal.

Neurolife Non-invasive Solutions Inc. developed technology based on Braxton's patent. They won Purdue University's business plan competition in 2006 and were using the funds to develop iScan, its initial prototype. The approach worked on measuring ICP non-invasively by assessing changes in the retinal blood flow. However this is dependent on other factors apart from ICP, so it will be difficult to generate accuracy sufficient for clinical practice.

Third Eye Diagnostics, Inc. is developing the Cerepress™, a non-invasive, hand-held intracranial pressure monitor that gathers information from the patient's un-dilated eye. The Cerepress™ measures blood pressure in the eye's central retinal vein (CRV) and blood velocity in the ophthalmic artery, which taken together highly correlate to intracranial pressure. To obtain CRV pressure, 3ED has developed a novel apparatus that simultaneously record images of the CRV and measures intraocular pressure (IOP) while the pressure in the eye is increased. A medical technician aligns the system by easily centering the field of view to patient's pupil eye. The system then contacts the patient's cornea and simultaneously collects images of the cornea and the retinal fundus. The contact force increases the IOP and momentarily compresses the CRV. At the instant of complete CRV compression, the Cerepress™ records the eye pressure, which is equivalent to CRV pressure. CRV pressure is a known to be a good correlate to ICP. This method requires an individual patient-specific calibration as every other "correlation-based" method.

== See also ==
- Intracranial pressure
- Intracranial hypotension
- Intracranial pressure monitoring
- Headache
- Meningitis
- Space adaptation syndrome
- Traumatic brain injury
- Cushing's triad
