= Rao Sardar Ali Khan =

Pakistani police officer (born 1965)

- راؤ سردار علی خان

Inspector-General of the Punjab Police
- In office 8 September 2021 – 22 July 2022
- Governor: Chaudhry Mohammad Sarwar; Omer Sarfraz Cheema; Muhammad Baligh Ur Rehman
- Chief Minister: Usman Buzdar; Hamza Shahbaz
- Preceded by: Inam Ghani
- Succeeded by: Faisal Shahkar

Personal details
- Born: Rao Sardar Ali Khan; 21 February 1965 (age 61) Lodhran, West Pakistan, Pakistan (now Punjab, Pakistan)
- Education: King Edward Medical College
- Occupation: Civil servant; police officer
- Known for: IGP Punjab
- Police career
- Country: Pakistan
- Allegiance: Police Service of Pakistan
- Department: Punjab Police; Intelligence Bureau
- Branch: Punjab Safe Cities Authority
- Service years: 1990–present
- Rank: Inspector-general

Rao Sardar Ali Khan (Urdu: راؤ سردار علی خان; born 21 February 1965) is a Pakistani civil servant and police officer who served as inspector-general of police (IGP) of the Punjab Police. He served from 8 September 2021 to 22 July 2022. Prior to his retirement, he served as IG of Railway Police of Pakistan. On 29 June 2025, he was appointed as a Member of the Federal Public Service Commission (FPSC) of Pakistan.

== Early life and education ==
Rao Sardar Ali Khan was born on 21 February 1965, in Lodhran, Pakistan. His family migrated from Julana, Jind District, Haryana, in 1947. Prior to joining the civil service, he graduated with an MBBS from the King Edward Medical College in Lahore.

== Career ==
Rao Sardar is a graduate of the 18th Common batch of the Civil Service. He was commissioned in the Police Service of Pakistan in 1990 at the age of 25, as an assistant superintendent of police (ASP). As ASP, he held postings in Quetta and Bannu, before discharging duties as a sub-divisional police officer (SDPO) in Quaidabad, Quetta, Samhari, Jafarabad, and Ferozewala. He was promoted to the rank of superintendent (SP), following which he served in various districts of the Punjab including Faisalabad, Bahawalpur, Sargodha, Rahim Yar Khan, Chakwal, and Mianwali. Later, he was appointed as the additional inspector-general (AIG) for Development and for Logistics, before being transferred to the Establishment Division in Islamabad.

Rao Sardar was then promoted to the rank of deputy inspector-general (DIG), served as DIG for Operations in Lahore, City Police Officer (CPO) in Faisalabad, and Regional Police Officer (RPO) in Sargodha and Bahawalpur. He also worked in the Intelligence Bureau for five years, during which he headed its Punjab branch, and served on a United Nations mission in an official capacity for eight months as well as in Australia for two years. In April 2020, Rao Sardar was given charge of leading the Punjab Safe Cities Authority as its Managing Director.

=== Inspector-general ===
In September 2021, it was announced that Rao Sardar had been selected to head the Punjab Police force, after his name was approved by prime minister Imran Khan and the federal cabinet for the slot of inspector-general of police. It was noted that he was the seventh police chief to be appointed in Punjab within three years during the tenure of the incumbent PTI-led Usman Buzdar ministry, which came into power in 2018. He replaced the outgoing IGP, Inam Ghani, who was transferred as the inspector-general for Pakistan Railways Police.

Sardar's name had reportedly remained in contention for the post of IGP earlier in September 2020 as well, when Ghani was nominated. At the time of his appointment, Sardar was a senior Grade 21 officer. He was shortlisted for the position amongst three candidates. According to sources in the police, he enjoyed a "highly professional, competent, and honest" reputation and was considered by his peers as someone capable of turning around the police department and tackling crime rates in the Punjab. However, they maintained that his success depended upon how much of a "free hand" he would be allowed by the Chief Minister to run his team, and whether there would be any political interference from the provincial government.

Rao Sardar took office as the 53rd inspector-general of Punjab Police on 8 September 2021. On the day of his appointment, he met Chief Minister Buzdar and held a press briefing with the media outlining his priorities as police chief. He shared his views on stemming corruption within the police department, taking action against fake FIRs, enforcing crackdowns against land mafia, tackling crimes against women, children and minorities, and transforming the police from a "force-oriented to service-oriented" department. In May 2022, Sardar was promoted to Grade 22 following a meeting of the High Powered Selection Board (HPSB). In July 2022, he was transferred to Railway Police as Inspector General of Railway Police. In February 2025, he retired from Punjab Police.

=== Federal Public Service Commission ===
On 29 June 2025, following a brief retirement, he was appointed as Member of the Federal Public Service Commission of Pakistan. This appointment is for a period of three years.

Police appointments
Preceded by Inam Ghani	Inspector-General of the Punjab Police	Incumbent
