= List of tallest buildings in Lahore =

This list of tallest buildings in Lahore ranks skyscrapers located in the city of Lahore, Pakistan.

== Tallest buildings ==
Name	Height	Floors	Year
Arfa Software Technology Park	106 m (348 ft)	17	2008
Madison Square Tower	95 m (312 ft)	25	2026
Pace Tower	90 m (295 ft)	24	2018
Indigo Heights	90 m (295 ft)	22 (including 3 underground basements)	2020
The Skyscraper	84 m (276 ft)	21	2026
Tricon Tower	80 m (262 ft)	19	2015
Al Hafeez Executive Tower	78 m (256 ft)	21	2021
Pentasquare	72 m (236 ft)	19	2020
Hi Q Tower	70 m (230 ft)	21 (including 3 underground spacious basements)	2020
Gold Crest Souq DHA	70 m (230 ft)	18	2021
Boulevard Heights	70 m (230 ft)	16	2018
Hyatt Regency	70 m (230 ft)	16	2019
Askari Tower	70 m (230 ft)	15	2020
Al Hafeez Heights	70 m (230 ft)	15	2018
Chughtai Lab Tower	70 m (230 ft)	15	2020

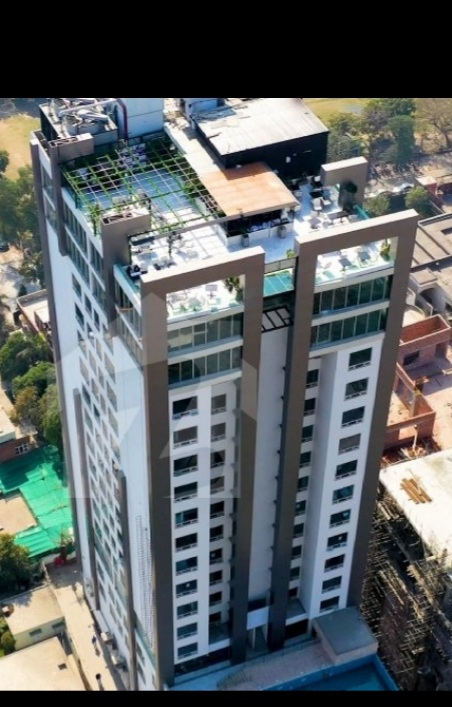
Indigo Heights

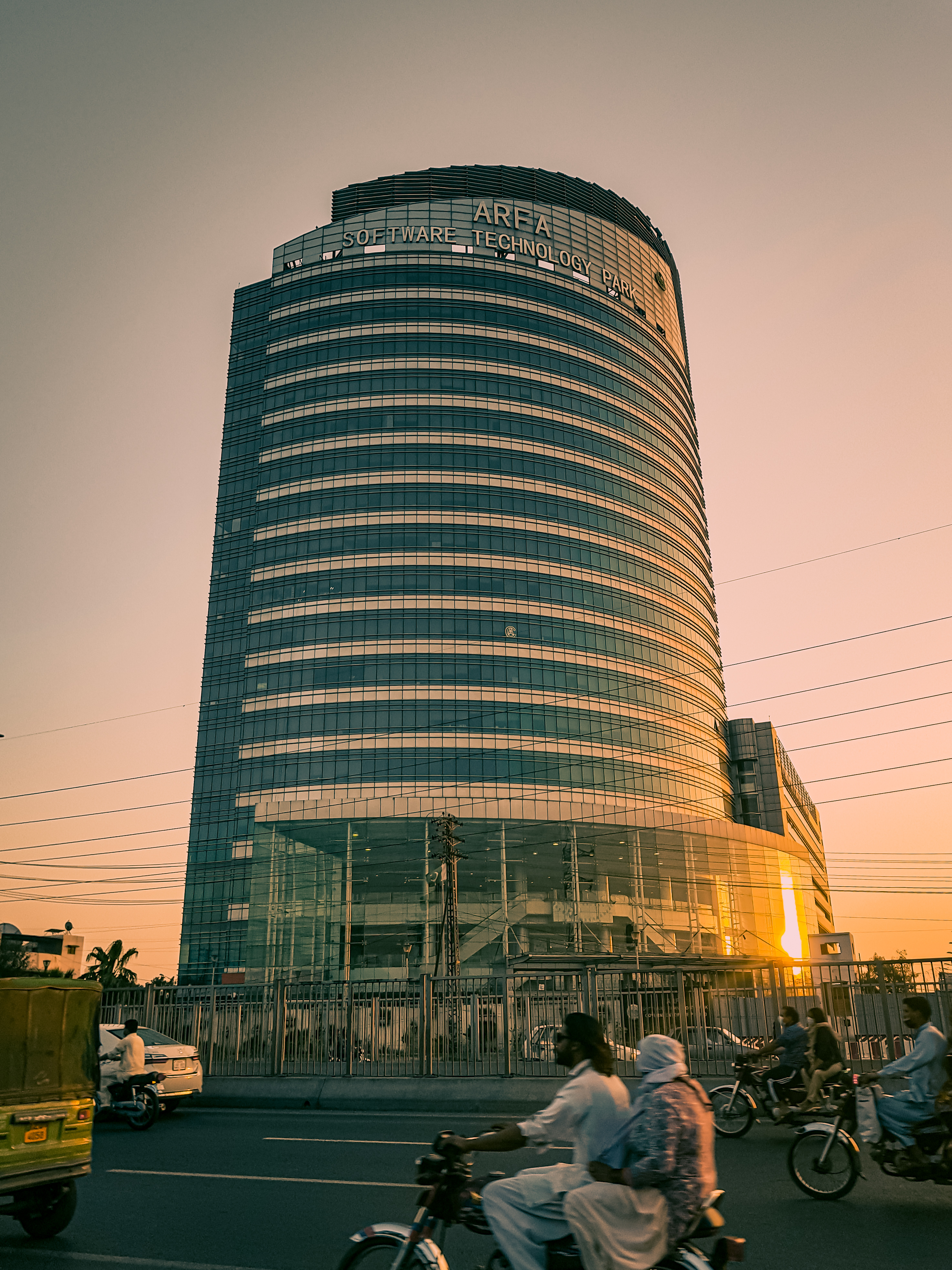
Arfa Karim Tower

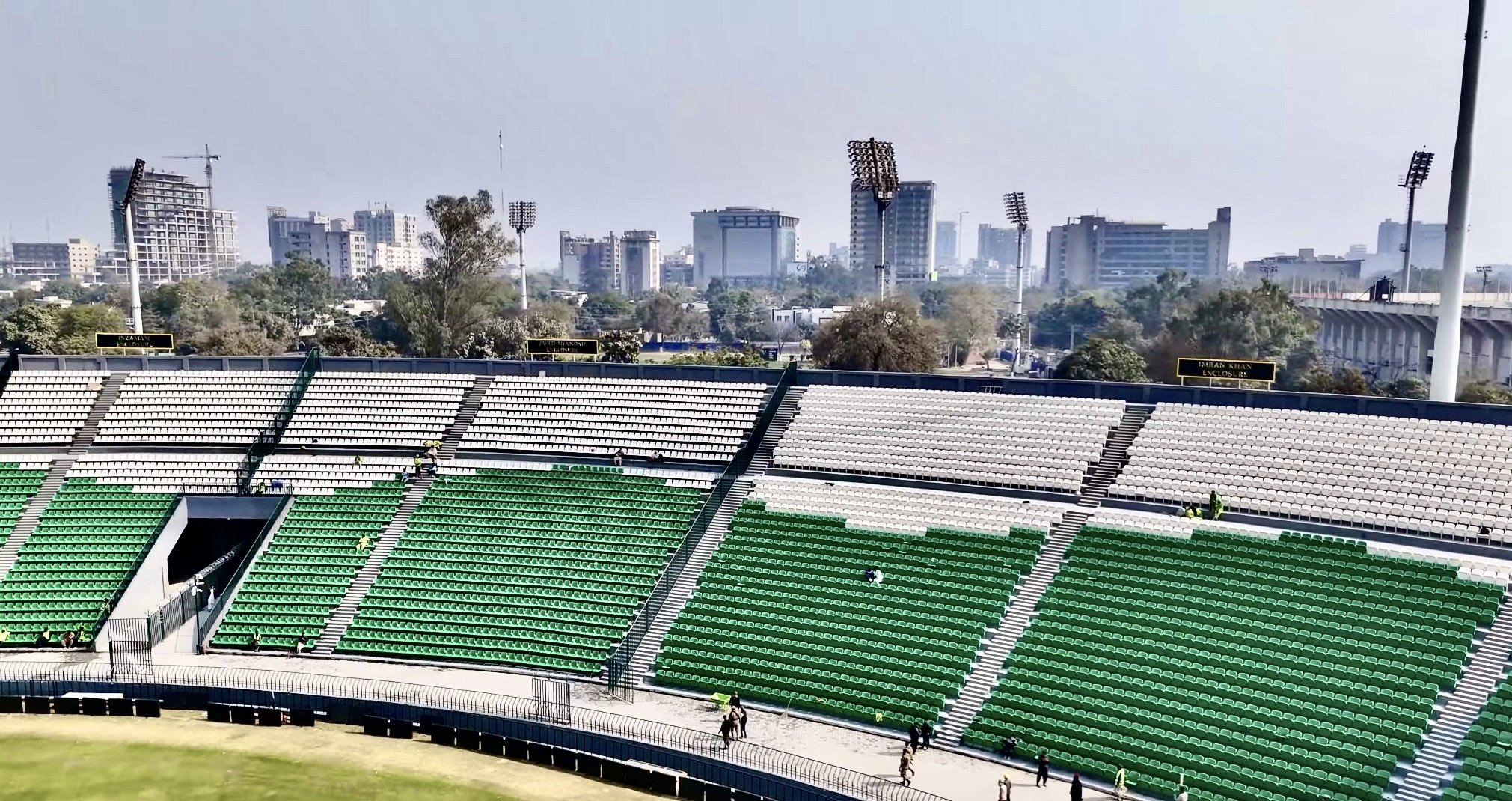
Lahore Skyline from Gaddafi Stadium

== Under construction ==
Many skyscrapers and around 150 high-rise buildings were being constructed under the Lahore Development Authority (LDA) in Lahore.

Name	Floors	Height	TBC	References
Zameen Vault	38	137m (450ft)	2030	
Celestia IT & Office Tower	19	76-88m (250-290ft, 450 ft height allowed)	2027	
Orient Square	45	170 m (558 ft)	2022	
Nova- Prime 1	40	158 m (518 ft)	2026	
Autograph Signature suites	28	92 m (300 ft)	2027	
Prime 2	38	150 m (492 ft)	2026	
Prime 3	32	140 m (459 ft)	2026	
Gulberg City Center	30	130 m (427 ft)	2026	
Prime 4	28	110 m (361 ft)	2026	
Prime 4	28	110 m (361 ft)	2026	
Galleria Residences	25		2024	
T21		90		

== See also ==
- List of tallest buildings in Islamabad
- List of tallest buildings in Pakistan
