= National Freelance Training Program =

Pakistani governmental training program

- National Freelance Training Program
- Nickname: NFTP
- Legal status: Government Owned
- Purpose: Empowering youth across Pakistan
- Location: Pakistan
- Website: nftp.pitb.gov.pk

National Freelance Training Program (NFTP) is a training program by the Ministry of Information Technology and Telecommunication (MoITT) and Punjab Information Technology Board (PITB). NFTP offering course includes freelancing, Technical, Content marketing and advertising and Creative design across the country in 18 cities having 20 centres.
