= Umar Saif =

Pakistani computer scientist and entrepreneur

Umar Saif SI
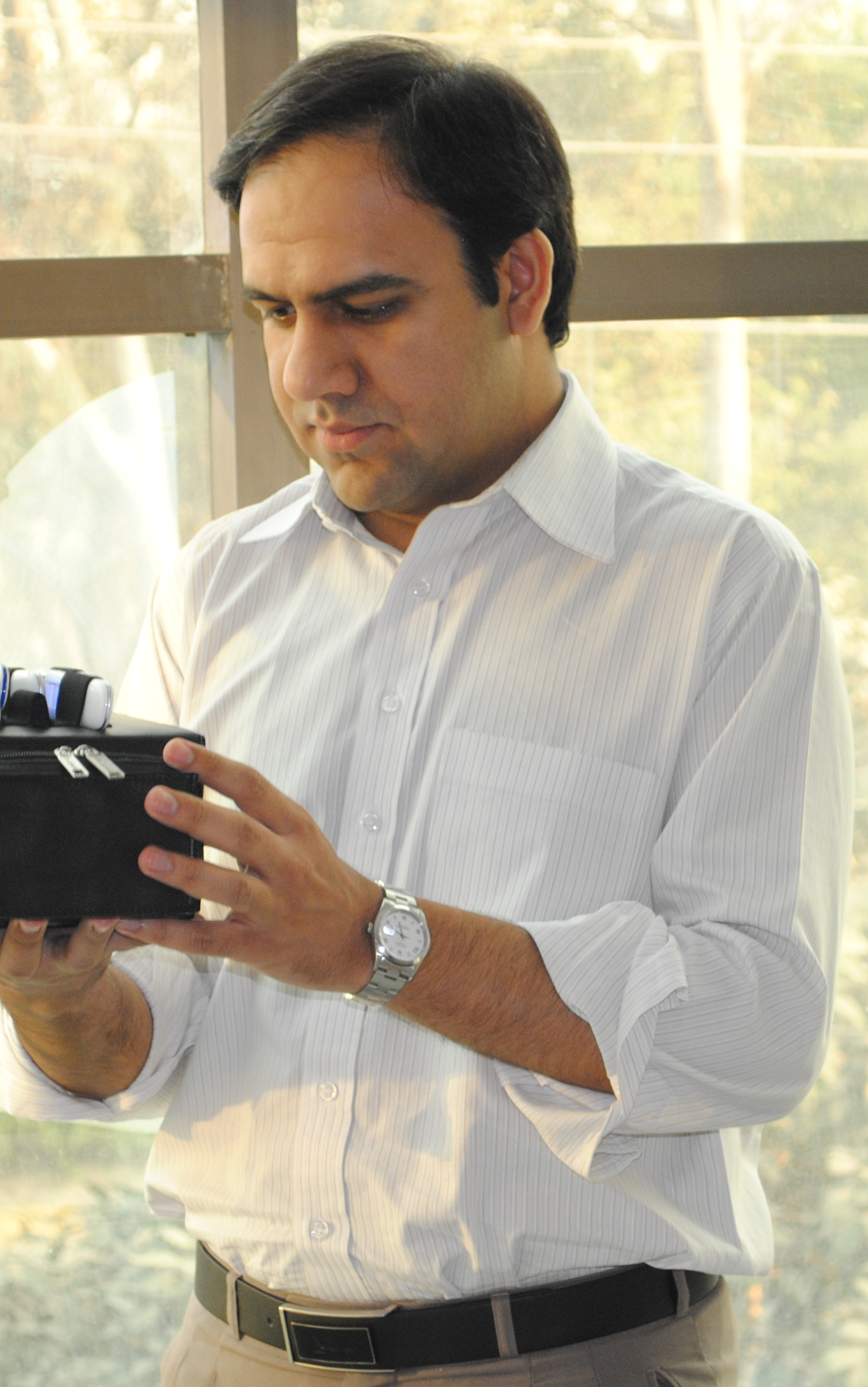

Federal Minister for Science & Technology, and Ministry of Information Technology and Telecommunication (Pakistan)
- Caretaker
- In office 17 August 2023 – 4 March 2024
- President: Arif Alvi
- Prime Minister: Anwaar ul Haq Kakar
- Preceded by: Syed Aminul Haque
- Succeeded by: Khalid Maqbool Siddiqui

Chairman of Punjab Information Technology Board
- Preceded by: Agha Hassan Baloch
- Succeeded by: Habib-ur-Rehman Gilani

Personal details
- Education: Lahore University of Management Sciences; University of Cambridge; Massachusetts Institute of Technology
- Website: umarsaif.org

Umar Saif (Urdu: عمر سیف; born 1979) is a Pakistani computer scientist and academic. He is known for his contributions to the tech ecosystem in Pakistan. He is the founder and CEO of aiSight.ai (formerly SurveyAuto Inc.), Chief Digital Officer of the Jang Group and CEO of Khudi Ventures. He served as interim Federal Minister For Science and Technology, as well as Minister of IT from August 2023 to March 2024. He is also serving as an advisor to the United Nations Development Programme in Pakistan.

After studying computer science at the Lahore University of Management Sciences (LUMS), Saif received his doctorate from the University of Cambridge at the age of 22. He then moved to the Massachusetts Institute of Technology where he did his postdoc. He returned to Pakistan in 2005 and joined LUMS where he taught as an associate professor of computer science between 2006 and 2013.

In 2011, Saif was appointed as chairman of the Punjab Information Technology Board (PITB) and also became a cabinet member in Government of Punjab. During his tenure as a chair of the PITB between 2011 and 2018, he founded Pakistan's first technology incubator, Plan 9 and carried out more than 300 projects. Simultaneously, he served as the founding vice-chancellor of the Information Technology University from 2013 to 2018.

For his research, entrepreneurial ventures, and for being one of the key architects behind digital governance of Punjab and one of the main driving forces behind the IT ecosystem in the country, he was awarded numerous notable awards and titles such as Young Global Leader by the World Economic Forum, Google's Faculty Research Award, Sitara-i-Imtiaz, UNESCO Chair for using ICT for Development, and was named as one of the top 35 young innovators in the world by the MIT Technology Review (TR35). He was named among The 500 Most Influential Muslims consecutively between 2015 and 2025.

== Early life and education ==
Saif was born in Pakistan. He attended Aitchison College before enrolling at Lahore University of Management Sciences where he obtained a Bachelor of Science degree in computer science in 1998. He received a doctor of philosophy degree in computer science from the University of Cambridge at the age of 22 in 2001. In 2002 he did his postdoc at MIT, also in computer science. From 2001 to 2005 he taught at MIT and worked at the MIT Computer Science and Artificial Intelligence Laboratory (CSAIL) as a research scientist, becoming part of the team which developed Project Oxygen.

== Career ==
Upon returning to Pakistan in 2005, Saif joined LUMS where he worked as an associate professor of computer sciences between 2006 and 2013. He became one of the youngest tenured professors at LUMS in 2009. While teaching full-time, Saif carried out several research projects.

In 2010 Saif was named as Young Global Leader by the World Economic Forum. In 2011 he was placed on MIT's TR35 list, naming him as one of the world's top 35 young innovators for developing a bittorrent client, BitMate, and a text message-based social network, SMSall. The same year he became the first Pakistani to receive the Google's Faculty Research Award. Upon learning of his achievements the Chief Minister of the Punjab, Shahbaz Sharif, invited Saif to head the Punjab Information Technology Board (PITB). In November 2011 he was appointed Chairman of the PITB. In his role as Chairman of the PITB Saif was made responsible for all public-sector information technology projects in Punjab. In 2012 he established Pakistan's first technology incubator, Plan 9, with financial support from the government and became known for introducing the startup culture to Pakistan. During his tenure as Chairman of the PITB, he also established E-Rozgaar programme.

He also founded Pakistan's first start-up incubator, SCI. In response to the 2011 outbreak of dengue fever in Pakistan PITB, under Saif's supervision, developed a smartphone-based early warning system to assist medical teams in curbing the outbreaks which received extensive recognition. He played a vital role in digitalising the land records in Punjab as well those of police, and other departments of the Punjab government.

Saif established Pakistan's first IT university Information Technology University (ITU) and on 20 January 2013, he was appointed as the first and founding Vice Chancellor of the ITU by the Government of Punjab. At the age of 34, he became the youngest vice chancellor of a university in Pakistan at the time. In November 2016 he was inducted into the Punjab provincial cabinet of Chief Minister Shahbaz Sharif and was appointed as an adviser to the Chief Minister. In March 2017 Saif began co-hosting the reality television series Idea Croron Ka as a business expert.

On 12 November 2018, the government of Punjab asked Saif to step down from the office of chairman of the PITB and Vice Chancellor of Information Technology University.

He is credited for being the brains behind digital governance of Punjab and one of the main driving forces behind the IT ecosystem in the country. During his term as chairman of the PITB, more than 300 projects were carried out.

In January 2019, Saif joined Jang Group as Chief Digital Officer. In February 2019, Saif founded his new startup called SurveyAuto and also announced to start his own venture capital firm called Khudi Ventures.

In August 2023, Saif joined cabinet of caretaker prime minister Anwar ul Haq Kakar, taking offices of IT And Science Minister.

In December 2023, In his role as the Caretaker Minister for Information Technology and Telecommunications, Saif announced that the caretaker federal cabinet had given approval for Pakistan's inaugural National Space Policy. Additionally, he also revealed plans to establish the National Cyber Crime Investigation Agency (NCCIA) to supplant the Federal Investigation Agency (FIA) in handling cybercrimes, alongside the creation of a specialized telecom tribunal. In January 2024, Saif initiated the Pakistan Startup Fund, a government initiative aimed at investing Rs2 billion annually in Pakistani startups. Additionally, he claimed that the nation's IT exports had risen by 32 percent in the preceding 60 days. The same month, Saif inaugurated the Pakistan Internet Exchange during his tenure as Caretaker Minister for IT. In February, The International Telecommunications Union (ITU) has appointed Dr. Umar Saif to the Digital Innovation Board of the Innovation and Entrepreneurship Alliance for Digital Development.

He stepped down from his positions as Minister for Information Technology and Telecommunication and Minister for Science and Technology when the caretaker cabinet of PM Kakar was dissolved on 4 March 2024. Dr Umar Saif launched Dil Ka Rishta app, which is Pakistan's largest matrimonial app in 2022 .

== Recognition ==
In 2006, Saif received the Digital Inclusion Award from Microsoft Research. The same year he received the IDG CIO Technology Pioneer Award. In August 2014 Saif was awarded the Sitara-i-Imtiaz by the Government of Pakistan for his services in the field of education and information technology. In 2015 and again in 2016 he was named as one of the 500 most influential Muslims. In March 2017 he was awarded the Alumni Award in the professional achievement award category by the British Council. In April 2018, he was appointed UNESCO chair for using Information and Communication Technology for Development.

In May 2018, Bill Gates commended Saif for enabling Pakistan to use technology for immunisation coverage.

In 2023, he was again named as one of the 500 most influential Muslims.
