= Intracranial pressure monitoring =

- ICD-9-CM: 01.10
- MedlinePlus: 003411

The monitoring of intracranial pressure (ICP) is used in the treatment of a number of neurological conditions ranging from severe traumatic brain injury to stroke and brain bleeds. This process is called intracranial pressure monitoring. Monitoring is important as persistent increases in ICP is associated with worse prognosis in brain injuries due to decreased oxygen delivery to the injured area and risk of brain herniation.

ICP monitoring is usually used on patients who have decreased score on the Glasgow Coma Scale, indicating poor neurologic function. It is also used in patients who have non-reassuring imaging on CT, indicating compression of normal structures from swelling.

Most current clinically available measurement methods are invasive, requiring surgery to place the monitor in the brain itself. Of these, external ventricular drainage (EVD) ventriculostomy is the current gold standard as it allows physicians to both monitor ICP and treat if necessary. Some non-invasive intracranial pressure measurement methods are currently being studied, however none are currently able to deliver the same accuracy and reliability of invasive methods.

Intracranial pressure monitoring is just one tool to manage ICP. It is used in conjunction with other techniques such as ventilator settings to manage levels of carbon dioxide in the blood, head and neck position, and other therapies such as hyperosmolar therapy, medications, and core temperature. However, there is no current consensus on the clinical benefit of ICP monitoring in overall ICP management, with evidence both supporting its use and finding no benefit in reducing mortality.

== Pathophysiology ==
Injury to the brain will often result in brain swelling. As the brain is encased in the skull, limited swelling can be accommodated until the brain is no longer able to maintain normal function. There are two potential negative consequences from this swelling: ischemia due to compression of the brain tissue resulting in lack of blood and oxygen, and herniation of the brain.

The three main components in determining ICP is the blood circulation in the brain, cerebrospinal fluid (CSF), and the brain tissue itself. This relationship is dictated by the Monro-Kellie doctrine, which states that as the brain swells, intracranial pressure (ICP) rises and cerebral perfusion decreases. As the brain swelling exceeds a certain point called the critical closing pressure (CrCP), the arterioles feeding the brain oxygen-rich blood will collapse, and the brain becomes deprived of blood. This secondary injury can cause permanent brain damage from lack of oxygen.

Herniation of the brain can occur when the pressure inside the skull exceeds the pressure of the spinal canal. This is dangerous as it can result in the compression of important areas like the brainstem that regulate breathing leading to significant neurological impairment or death.

== Methods ==
Under normal conditions, regular movements such as leaning forward, normal heartbeat and breathing can cause changes to the ICP. Intracranial monitoring accounts for this by averaging measurements over 30 minutes in non-comatose patients. Readings between 7-15mmHg are considered normal in an adult, 3-7mmHg in children, and 1.4-6mmHg in infants.

=== Invasive ===
==== External ventricular drainage ====
The external ventricular drainage (EVD) method of intracranial pressure monitoring is the current gold standard. The placement of an EVD requires a catheter placed into one of the lateral ventricles from a burr hole made into the skull. Benefits of an EVD include its ability to not only measure changes in pressure but also drain CSF as needed, thus making it both diagnostic and therapeutic. Significantly, an EVD can also be re-calibrated after placement which is particularly useful clinically to manage measurement drift. Risks in the operation to place the EVD are minimal but include infection, brain bleeds, pneumocephalus or pneumoventriculi, and CSF leakage. Drawbacks to EVDs are the difficulty to place in comparison to other methods -- especially in the setting of brain swelling or anatomical variation in ventricle size – and once placed, are at increased risk of blockage from blood, air bubbles, or other debris.

==== Intraparenchymal pressure monitor ====
There are three types of intraparenchymal pressure monitors (IPM), also called bolts: fiber optic, strain gauge, and pneumatic sensors. Fiber optic monitors use changes in light reflected back from a mirror at the end of the cable to reflect changes in the ICP. Strain gauge monitors use a diaphragm that is bent by surrounding pressure, which is then converted into electrical signals used to calculate changes in ICP. Pneumatic sensors are fitted with a balloon which measures the surrounding pressure, thereby measuring the ICP. IPMs are as equally accurate as EVDs, but cannot be recalibrated after placement, which is a major clinical limitation of this method of intracranial pressure monitoring. Risks of IPMs are similar to risks of EVDs as both require a surgical procedure. However, placement of IPMs is still considered less invasive than placement of EVDs. Additionally, placement of IPMs do not require the precision needed for EVD placement, and they are less affected by structural changes to the brain such as brain swelling or midline shift. IPMs can be placed not only in the parenchyma but also in the ventricular, subarachnoid, subdural, or epidural spaces. Generally, IPMs are chosen when EVD placement is unsuccessful or if CSF drainage is determined to likely not be necessary.

==== Continuous brain tissue oxygen tension (PbO2) ====
This method of intracranial pressure monitoring requires placement of an oxygen probe into the penumbra, the area surrounding the injury that is most at risk of secondary injury from hypoxia. The probe measures levels of oxygen in the area, with levels under 15mmHg treated with increasing oxygen levels in the body.

=== Non-invasive ===
There are many noninvasive methods for intracranial pressure monitoring such as transcranial doppler (TCD), and optic nerve sheath diameter (ONSD). While none of these methods have been able to have the accuracy, reliability, and independent validation of invasive methods, they may eventually be used in determining the severity of injury and if there is a need for more invasive measures.
