= Punjab Information Technology Board =

Govt Organization in Pakistan

The Punjab Information Technology Board (PITB) is a department of the Government of Punjab. It was established in 1999 by the Government of the Punjab as an autonomous body under the Department of Industries, operating under the administration of Information Technology Department from 2001 to 2011. The key focus of the department was to monitor global opportunities, cater to the growing need for IT, develop policy initiatives, planning and implementation of initiatives to increase the competitiveness of the IT industry in the Punjab province. The Information Technology department was dissolved in 2011, and PITB was attached under the Planning & Development Department Punjab. Humjkkk

== Budget ==
	=== Non Development Budget ===			=== Development Budget ===		
Fiscal Year	Allocated (PKR)	Modified (PKR)	Expenditure (PKR)	Allocated (PKR)	Modified (PKR)	Expenditure (PKR)
2019 - 2020	558,751,000	-	-	1,939,168,000	-	-
2018 - 2019	947,985,000	788,579,101	776,927,159	1,093,494,000	1,365,584,236	1,291,816,507
2017 - 2018	694,903,000	890,252,564	793,622,109	2,573,325,000	2,701,464,290	1,663,110,016
2016 - 2017	399,656,000	850,161,000	472,036,000	1,790,343,000	1,661,488,000	1,277,161,000
2015 - 2016	308,842,000	901,655,000	591,370,629	1,093,631,000	1,125,225,000	938,010,000
2014 - 2015	173,574,000	257,854,000	240,638,902	1,141,045,000	1,300,819,000	1,093,349,295
2013 - 2014	139, 478, 000	228, 707, 000	217, 598, 697	932, 968, 000	-	611, 708, 632
2012 - 2013	125,673,500	169,921,700	166,366,497	1,462,848,000	1,489,111,000	1,124,677,841
2011 - 2012	96,540,000	166,990,956	157,863,009	750,869,000	594,012,000	544,054,324
