= Pakistan Navy Engineering College =

Pakistan Navy's detachment/school for marine engineering

- دانشکدہ بحریہ برائے علومِ مہندسی ، پاکستان
- Constituent College of
- National University of Sciences & Technology
- Crest of the Pakistan Navy Engineering College
- Location: Karachi, Sindh, Pakistan
- Abbreviation: PNEC
- Motto in English: Committed to Excellence
- Established: 1962; 64 years ago
- Colors
- Sister college: College of Electrical & Mechanical Engineering; College of Aeronautical Engineering
- Freshman dorm: Companies
- Rector: Captain Irfan Nadeem
- Dean: Captain Zulfiqar Ahmed Khan
- Membership: PEC, HEC
- Website: pnec.nust.edu.pk

The Pakistan Navy Engineering College (reporting name: PNEC/PNS Jauhar) is a direct reporting detachment and a military engineering college located in Karachi, Sindh, Pakistan.

Operated under administration of the Pakistan Navy, it is also a constituent college of the National University of Sciences and Technology, Pakistan and the only technical school that provides education on naval architecture in Pakistan with undergraduate, post-grdaute, and doctoral degree programs.

== Overview ==
The school offers fellowships and research through the Pakistan Science Foundation at the postdoctoral level and maintains a research associateship program for both civilians and military officers. While the majority retains cadets and active-duty officers active-duty officers from all branches of the Pakistan Military, Pakistan Government civilians and civilian students can also attend the school; the faculty of school are civilians employed by the Pakistan Navy. The student body and the faculty consist of both civilians and naval officers. The Air Force Institute of Aviation Technology (AFIAT) served as the same purpose. The Pakistan Army also operates College of Electrical and Mechanical Engineering and Military College of Engineering also is counterpart of this institution.

The school does not offer military staff or war courses but instead, the school concentrates to develop the science and technological applications for the government and the armed forces of the country. Previously, the school was referred to as PNS Jauhar but it gained university-level accreditation and was renamed as "Navy Engineering College" by the Pakistan government.

== History ==
The Pakistan Navy felt a need of establishing the science and engineering school to manage its engineering and science facilities apart from the using the personnel of Pakistan Army. Therefore, Defence Minister of Pakistan Admiral Afzal Rahman Khan signed Naval Order, establishing the school of naval engineering at Karachi. Chief of Naval Staff (Pakistan) Admiral Syed Mohammad Ahsan took personal initiatives to establish the school. The Order established the courses on ordnance and gunnery, electrical engineering, radio telegraphy, naval construction and civil engineering as well as continuing the original program in marine engineering. The PNEC is intended to function as equivalent to as United States Navy's Naval Postgraduate School (NPS) where, during its time of establishment, the military faculty member of NPS also took participation to help established and courses in the school after serving as the visiting faculty member of the school.

The school was first established as Officers Training Section (OTS) in 1962 as part of Pakistan Navy by then-Chief of Naval Staff (Pakistan) Admiral Afzal Rahman Khan who signed the naval decree to review the role of graduate education in the Navy. In 1966, Admiral Khan gained the status of OTS and helped the school to upgrade to that of a college and given the name of "Pakistan Navy Engineering College" (PNEC). In the most 1960s, the civilian faculty was employed by Ministry of Defense (Pakistan) and the PNEC was directly affiliated with Karachi University in the same year. In 1977, the affiliation of PNEC was transferred to NED University of Engineering and Technology after the NED University's faculty joined the PNEC's engineering faculty. During this time, the military members of Navy and other branches continued to attend the college while civilians taught courses. The PNEC was shifted to its present location in 1982 and commissioned as PNS Jauhar as an independent unit of Pakistan Navy. In 1995, Pakistan Parliament passed legislation to rename the school as "Pakistan Navy Engineering College (PNEC)", making the school a constituent college of National University of Sciences and Technology, Pakistan (NUST) based in Rawalpindi. The college conducts undergraduate, postgraduate and doctoral courses in Electrical, Mechanical and Manufacturing Engineering disciplines – leading to the award Graduate and Postgraduate Degrees by the National University of Sciences and Technology. The college awarded separate degrees in Electrical and Electronic Engineering up till 2010. Following the worldwide standard, the courses have been merged.

The primary role of the Pakistan Navy Engineering College (PNEC) is to educate and train engineers for the Pakistan Navy and the Government of Pakistan. To fulfil this mission, the college offers undergraduate degree programs in Mechanical, Electrical, and Industrial and Manufacturing Engineering. It also provides postgraduate education through M.S. and Ph.D. programs in Mechanical, Electrical, and Manufacturing Engineering.

The Pakistan Army's officers from Pakistan Army Corps of Electrical and Mechanical Engineering (EME Corps) have done their science and engineering programs from PNEC from 1982 to 1988, during this time period Army's college of EME was rebuilding and shifting from Quetta to Rawalpindi.

Since 1987, civilian students have also been enrolled in these courses each year. Apart from BS and MS/PhD degree courses, the college also provides specialized mid career courses for Navy's technical engineer and science officers after they have obtained competency certificate on board Naval service. These include courses on Marine Engineering, Weapon Systems Management and Weapons Engineering Systems, specially designed to meet the service requirements of the officers in their career.

The college achieved ISO 9001 certification in May 1999 as per 1994 standard. In June 2002, the college shifted to the new quality standards for instance, the ISO 9001: 2000. It was the first college to gain ISO 9001:2000 certification in Asia.

== Programs ==
The university offers undergraduate and graduate programs.

Undergraduate programs are offered in the following fields

- Mechanical Engineering
- Electrical Engineering
- Naval Architecture^{[5]}
- Computer Science

The department of Electrical and Power Engineering offers the following graduate courses:

- MS Control Engineering
- MS Communications Engineering
- PhD Electrical Engineering

The Mechanical Engineering department offers the following

- MS Thermal Power
- MS Thermo-Fluids
- PhD Mechanical Engineering and Robotics

In addition evening courses, under the title Professional Development Courses, are offered.

While the above courses are open to all students, the following courses are offered to officers of the Navy exclusively.

- Marine Engineering Systems Management Course (MESMC)
- Weapon Engineering Systems Management Course (WESMC)

Certain courses are also offered to officers of allied countries. These are Saudi Arabia, UAE, Qatar, Oman, Sri Lanka, Bangladesh, Bahrain, Malaysia and Myanmar.

== Campus ==
The college campus is spread over an area of about seventy five acres comprising the administration block, four academic blocks, postgraduate studies center, labs and workshops, professional development center, hostels and dining facilities.

Campus facilities include:

- Laboratories and workshops
- Computer Aided Designing and Manufacturing (CADAM) Centre
- Computing facilities/IT infrastructure
- Professional Development Centre
- Accommodation and dining facilities
- Mosque
- Convocation hall/auditorium
- Sports facilities
- Transport
- Dispensary (sickbay)
- Cafeteria

Due to the recent increase in the number of students being admitted to PNEC, a new Hostel facility has been approved and construction has already started. The new building will increase the on-campus student accommodation capacity manifold. Off-campus housing is also available.

=== Campus life ===
Unlike most Pakistani universities, students at PNEC are required to wear uniforms and maintain a high level of discipline which is kept in check with a system of fines and punishments. Internet facility is also provided to the students at the hostels. The movement of in-living students is also kept in check and they are only allowed to go outside within scheduled timings provided they have the proper permits.

=== Student societies ===
PNEC has several student-managed societies. ASHRAE (American Society of Heating, Refrigeration and Air-Conditioning Engineers), IEEE (Institute of Electrical and Electronics Engineers), MACS (Media and Communications Society), AIR (Alumni and Industrial Relations) Society, AIESEC, IMechE and ASME (American Society of Mechanical Engineers) are among the known ones.

=== Automotive Club ===
In the recent years, a number of automotive teams have been formed. The oldest, Team PNEC-NUST, formed in 2009, represents Pakistan in Shell Eco-Marathon Asia where they compete against teams from all over Asia on various metrics like Mileage, Design and Media Campaign. The NUST Formula Student (NFS) Team, formed in 2012, represents Pakistan in the Formula Student UK and Formula Student Germany in the Internal Combustion (IC) category while Formula Electric Racing-NUST (FERN), formed in 2014, raises the national flag in Formula SAE Electric, USA and Formula Student UK, in the Electric Vehicle (EV) category. As suggested by the name of their competitions, the primary metrics used for the Formula teams are Design, Acceleration and Lap Time with Cost and Business Presentation as other important events. The three teams are collectively not referred to as the Automotive Club. These teams are held in very high regard in the college, drawing the most talented minds available and have become the epitome of students' capability to conceive, challenge, manage and achieve as these teams are almost entirely student-run and their tasks range from finding sponsors, building a race car, shipping the car and representing the country.

=== Library ===
Computers with Internet connectivity are available for registered students. The library issues books on short-term loan. A section known as the "Book Bank" stocks used textbooks. The Book Bank loans out text-books to undergraduate students for a whole semester, charging 10% of the original cost of the book.

=== Professional Development Center ===
For engineering industry professionals and students alike, a wide variety of courses are offered for continuous learning, taught by industry professionals.

== Laboratories and workshops ==
- Applied Chemistry Laboratory
- Advance Physics Laboratory
- Gas Turbine Laboratory
- Thermodynamics Laboratory
- Fluid Mechanics Laboratory
- Control Engineering Laboratory
- Mechanics Laboratory
- Metallurgy and Fuel Laboratory
- Electronics Laboratory
- Electrical Engineering Laboratory
- Telecommunication Laboratory
- Microprocessor Laboratory
- Microwave and Radar Laboratory
- PCB Laboratory
- Power Electronics Laboratory
- Applied Chemistry Laboratory
- Bench Fitting Workshop
- Machine Workshop
- Welding Workshop
- Woodwork Workshop
- Boiler Workshop
- Engineering Drawing Section
- Computer Integrated Manufacturing (CIM) Laboratory
- Innovative Product Laboratory
- Robotics and Automation Laboratory
- Atomic Force Microscope (ATF) Laboratory
- Materials Testing Laboratory
