= Nassar Ikram =

Pakistan Navy retired rear admiral

Rear Admiral Nassar Ikram

Vice-Chancellor Iqra University
- Incumbent
- Assumed office September 2023
- Preceded by: Wasim Qazi

Vice-Chancellor University of Central Punjab
- In office April 2021 – September 2023
- Preceded by: Mohammad Nizamuddin
- Succeeded by: Hadia Awan

Vice President NSTP
- In office December 2019 – April 2021
- Succeeded by: AVM Rizwan Riaz

Pro Rector NUST
- In office April 2017 – April 2021
- Succeeded by: AVM Rizwan Riaz

Commandant Pakistan Navy Engineering College
- In office July 2015 – April 2017
- Preceded by: Cdre Zahid Iqbal
- Succeeded by: Vice Admiral Imran Ahmad

Personal details
- Born: 7 February 1963 (age 63) Gujranwala, Punjab, Pakistan
- Relations: Saad Bin Zafar (Nephew)
- Education: Pakistan Naval Academy; PNEC; Royal Naval Engineering College; Cranfield University; Bradford University; National Defence University
- Awards: Hilal-i-Imtiaz (military); Sitara-i-Imtiaz (military); Sword of Honour

Military service
- Allegiance: Pakistan
- Branch/service: Pakistan Navy
- Years of service: 1981 - 2021
- Rank: Rear Admiral
- Commands: Deputy Director General Inter-Services Intelligence; Deputy Chief of the Naval Staff; Assistant Chief of the Naval Staff (C4I); Commandant Pakistan Navy Engineering College
- Battles/wars: Kargil War; Operation Parakaram; 2008 Indo-Pakistan standoff War in North West-Pakistan; 2015 India-Pakistan border skirmishes 2016 India-Pakistan Standoff; 2019 India–Pakistan standoff

Nassar Ikram, HI(M) SI(M) is a retired two-star admiral of the Pakistan Navy who was appointed as Pro-Rector, Research Innovation and Commercialization at NUST. He is currently serving as the vice chancellor of Iqra University.

== Military career ==
Ikram joined Pakistan Navy in 1979 and was commissioned to the Weapon Engineering branch in December 1983 winning the Sword of Honor. He graduated in Electrical Engineering from Pakistan Navy Engineering College in 1985, then affiliated with NED University, Karachi. He did his Weapon Engineering Application Course from Royal Naval Engineering College, UK in 1989. He obtained Masters in Electronics Systems Engineering from Cranfield University, UK in 1995. He is a graduate of National Defence University, Islamabad in National Security and War Studies and holds Master's degree in National Security & War Studies from Quaid-e-Azam University, Islamabad and Doctorate Degree in Cryptography from Bradford University, UK in 1999.

Ikram served onboard PNS Tughril, PNS Dacca, PNS Shamsher and PNS Munsif as Weapon Engineering Officer / Deputy Weapon Engineering Officer. He also served at PN Dockyard. He was an instructor at Electronic Warfare Training Centre, PNS Bahadur. His appointments include Deputy Director General Inter-Services Intelligence, Deputy Chief of Naval Staff at Naval Headquarters (NHQ), Assistant Chief of the Naval Staff at Naval Headquarters (NHQ) and Commandant Pakistan Navy Engineering College. He served as Pro-Rector, Research Innovation and Commercialization at NUST and played a pivotal role in the establishment of Pakistan’s first Science and Technology Park the National Science and Technology Park (NSTP). He served as NSTP's founding Vice-President.

== Academic career ==
Ikram has 83 publications in refereed journals and Conferences and three book chapters. He won the HEC Best University Teacher award in 2002. He led the team that authored Pakistan National Security Standard for testing of Crypto and IT products for Government of Pakistan. Ikram represents Pakistan in Asiacrypt and IT Security Common Criteria Recognition Arrangement (CCRA). A recipient of the President Technology Medal in 2015. In April 2021 he was appointed as the Vice-Chancellor at University of Central Punjab. He is currently serving as the President/Vice-Chancellor at Iqra University

== Awards and decorations ==
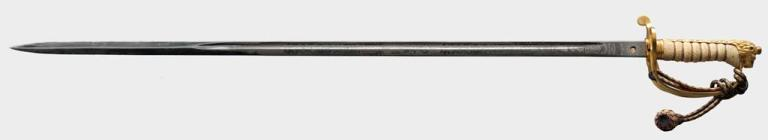

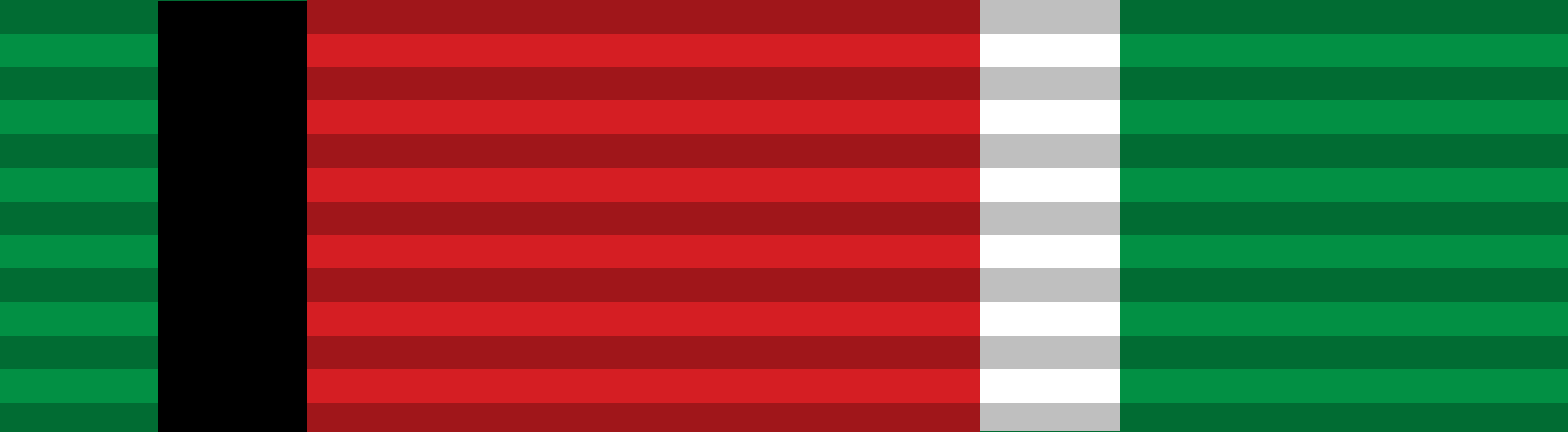

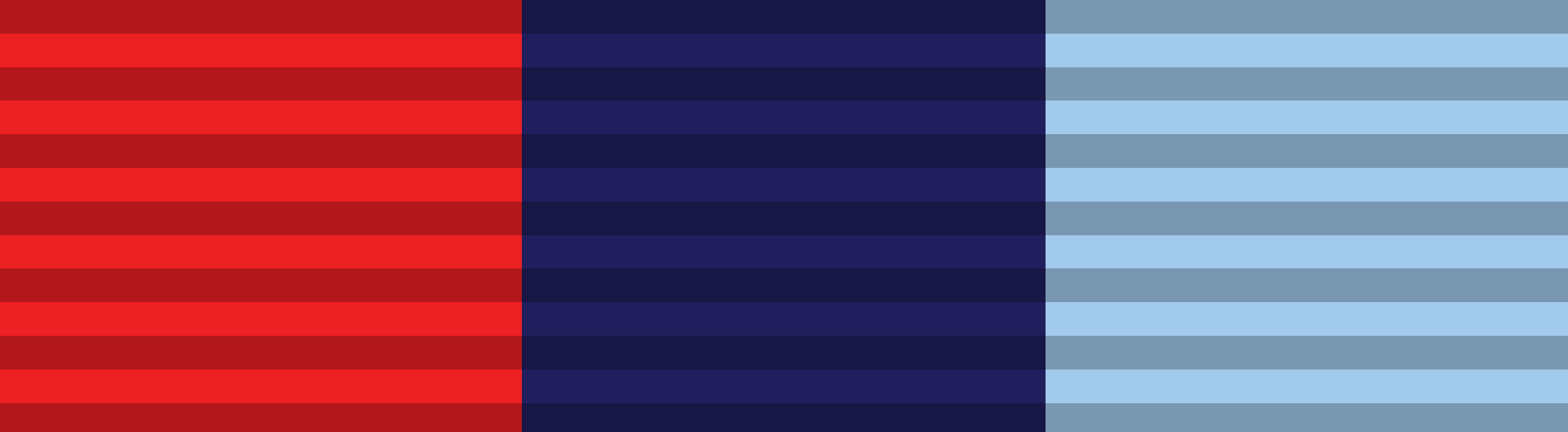

Sword of Honour
Surface Warfare Officer Pin
Command at Sea insignia
Hilal-e-Imtiaz (Crescent of Excellence)	Sitara-e-Imtiaz (Star of Excellence)	Tamgha-e-Diffa (General Service Medal)	Tamgha-e-Baqa (Nuclear Test Medal)
Tamgha-e-Istaqlal Pakistan (Escalation with India Medal)	Tamgha-e-Azm (Medal of Conviction)	Tamgha-e-qayam-e-Jamhuria (Republic Commemoration Medal)	10 Years Service Medal
20 Years Service Medal	30 Years Service Medal	35 Years Service Medal	40 Years Service Medal
Hijri Tamgha (Hijri Medal)	Jamhuriat Tamgha (Democracy Medal)	Qarardad-e-Pakistan Tamgha (Resolution Day)	Tamgha-e-Salgirah Pakistan (Independence Day)
