= Raja Muhammad Sarwar =

Pakistani army officer (1910–1948)

Captain Raja Muhammad Sarwar NH
- Sarwar, drawn posthumously in 1967
- Born: 10 November 1910; Singhori village, Rawalpindi District, Punjab, British India (Present day Punjab, Pakistan)
- Died: 27 July 1948 (aged 37); Uri, Jammu and Kashmir, India.
- Burial place: Hill of Tilpatra near Uri, Jammu and Kashmir in India
- Alma mater: Indian Military Academy; Military College of Signals
- Military career
- Allegiance: British India (1929–1947); Pakistan (1947–1948)
- Branch/service: British Indian Army; Pakistan Army
- Service years: 1929–1948
- Rank: Captain
- Units: 2/1st Punjab Regiment; 2 Punjab Regiment
- Conflicts: Second World War; Burma campaign; Indo-Pakistani War of 1947; Battle of Pandu †
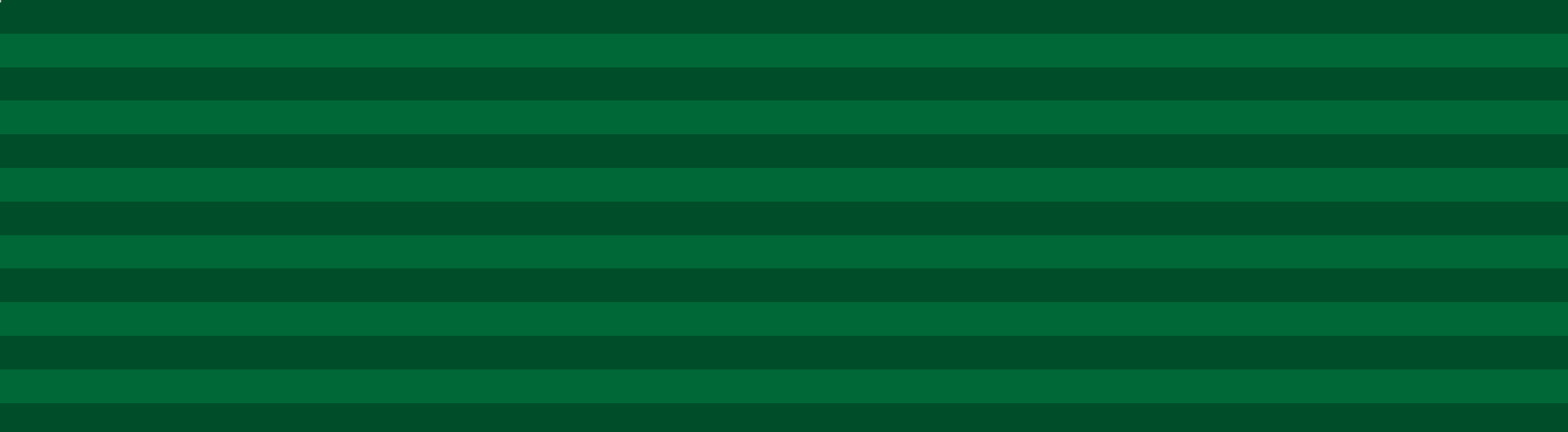
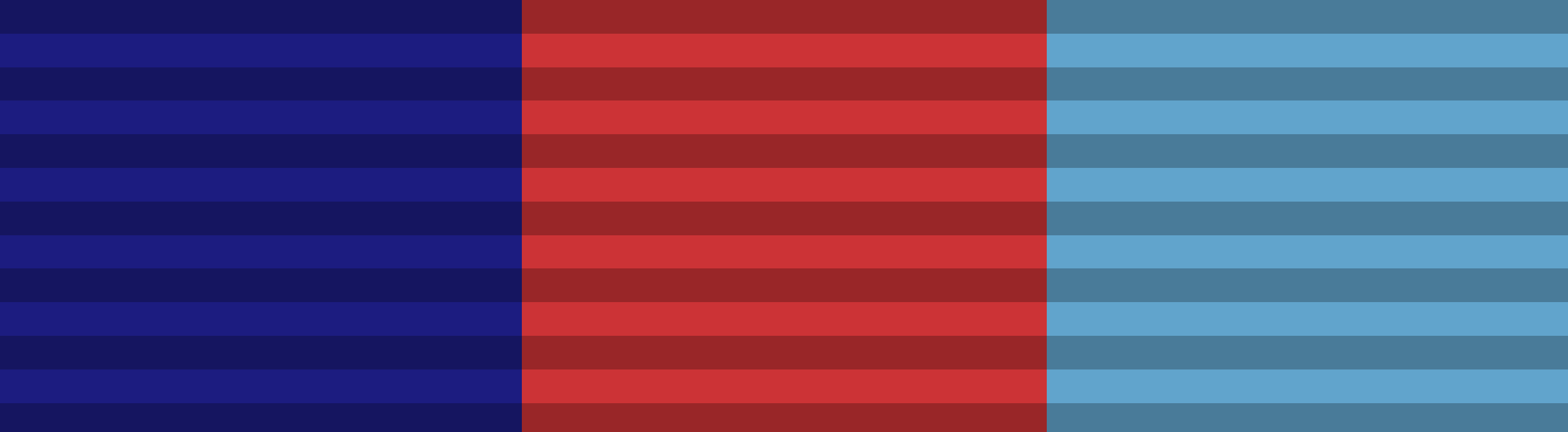
- Awards: Nishan-e-Haider Pakistan Medal 1939-1945 Star Burma Star War Medal 1939-1945
- Memorials: G.T. Road near the Gujar Khan Tehsil, Tehile chowk sarwer shaheed Rawalpindi District, Punjab in Pakistan

Captain Raja Muhammad Sarwar (Urdu: راجہ محمد سرور; 10 November 1910 – 27 July 1948) NH, better known as Muhammad Sarwar Bhatti, was a Pakistani military officer who was cited as the first recipient of Pakistan's highest military award, Nishan-e-Haider, for his gallantry and actions of valor during the First Indo-Pakistani War of 1947–48.

== Biography ==
Raja Muhammad Sarwar was born on 10 November 1910 to a Punjabi Muslim Bhatti Rajput family in a small village, Singhori, that was located in the vicinity of the Gujar Khan Tehsil, Rawalpindi District, Punjab, British India in British Indian Empire. He was a military brat whose father, Raja Muhammad Hayat Khan, was an enlist in the British Indian Army, retiring at the rank of Havildar.

He was educated in government-run schools in Rawalpindi District and secured his matriculation from a local school in Faisalabad in 1928. After graduation, he followed his father, Havildar Muhammad Hyatt, path and enlisted in the British Indian Army in 1929 as a Sepoy, where he was posted with the 2nd Battalion of the 10th Baloch Regiment (2/10th Baloch Regiment) of the Baloch Regiment (present 7th Battalion The Baloch Regiment (Steadfast Battalion)). From 1929 until 1939, he worked hard towards reaching one of the highest enlisted ranks and was eventually promoted to Naib Subedar and posted in supply and ammunition with the Pakistan Army Service Corps in 1939.

In 1939, Sarwar was invited to attend the Indian Military Academy in Dehradun and completed his military training before gaining a commission in the 2nd Battalion of the 1st Punjab Regiment (2/1st Punjab Regiment) of the British Indian Army in 1943. In 1944, 2nd-Lt. Sarwar briefly served in Burma with distinction during military operations there that earned him the Burma Star from the British administrations in Delhi in India.

In 1944, 2nd-Lt. Sarwar was posted to an administrative position in the Punjab Regiment — he was promoted to Lieutenant in 1945–46. In the British Indian Army personnel accounts, Sarwar was known to be "a serious man with a no nonsense attitude and was deeply religious who would practice his religion, Islam, devotedly and offered five prayers everyday ... "

=== Indo-Pakistani war of 1947-1948 ===
In 1946–47, Lt. Sarwar was promoted to army captain and decided to attend the signal course before he was recommissioned in the Pakistan Army Corps of Signals in 1947, and directed towards attending the Military College of Signals. After hearing the news of the First Kashmir War between India and Pakistan over Jammu and Kashmir, Sarwar immediately wanted to volunteer. He refrained due to his officers wanting him to complete his studies in military signals, which he completed after a year. In 1948, Captain Sarwar took command of the 2nd Battalion of the Punjab Regiment of the Pakistan Army and was deployed on the frontline.

A march towards Uri town of Jammu and Kashmir was commenced under Sarwar, and he led an attack on the organized Indian Army's troops, forcing them to retreat from Gilgit-Baltistan to Ladakh on 26 July 1948. Sarwar's company followed the Indian Army's troops to the Uri region where his unit faced off the strongly fortified enemy position located in that sector. His company was only 50 yards away from the fortified enemy position as the Indian Army's soldiers begin mortar shelling his positions, and received instructions on leading the attack on the left side of the bunker where the shelling was taking place. Moving towards the new position, his passage was blocked due to barbed wire and he decided to advance to cut the wire, taking six men with him. During the firefight, Sarwar used a bolt cutter to cut the wire, and took a bullet from machine gun fire.

On 27 July 1948, Captain Sarwar was killed while clearing the passage. He was 37 years old at the time.

=== Family background and personal life ===
Muhammad Sarwar's father, Raja Muhammad Hayat Khan, had served in the British Indian Army and was decorated with the British war medal for his services in World War I. Muhammad Hayat retired as a Havildar Sergeant and died on 23 November 1932. Muhammad Sarwar had three brothers and one sister. He is the 4th one among his brothers, his brothers' names were Raja Muhammad Mirza Khan, Raja Muhammad Sardar Khan, Raja Muhammad Afsar Khan and his sister's name was Gulzar Begum. His marriage was performed on Sunday 15 March 1936 in Sanghori, with Karam Jan. Allah blessed him with a son and a daughter, whom he named Raja Muhammad Safdar and Gulzar Begum, respectively.

== Nishan-e-Haider ==
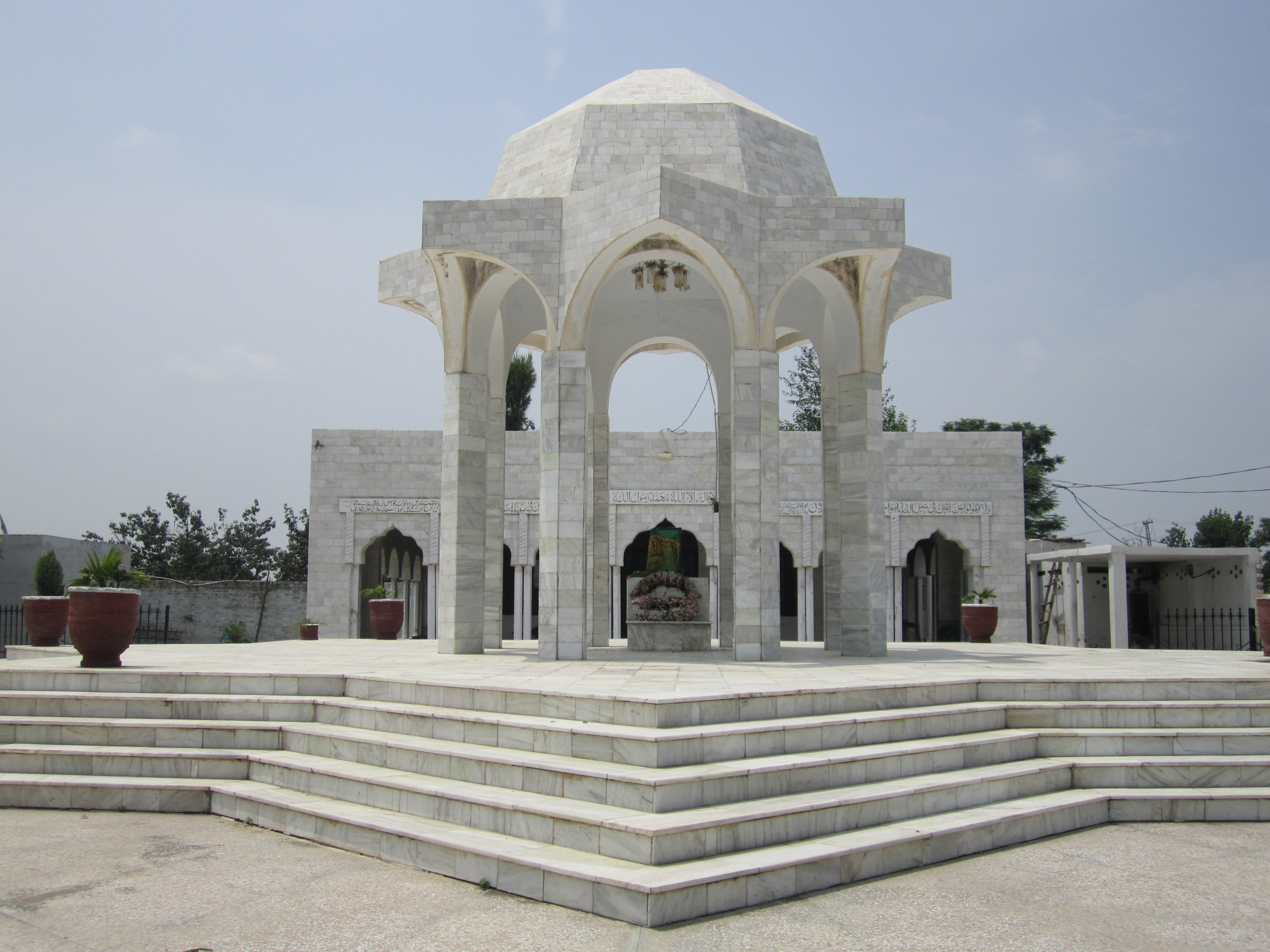
The monument to Raja Muhammad Sarwar near the Grand Trunk Road, near Mandra

The body of Sarwar is buried at the Hill of Tilpatra which is near the Uri in Indian Kashmir where he was buried on 27 July 1948. It was on 23 March 1956 when the Government of Pakistan recognized his services as the Parliament of Pakistan authorized to posthumously award the Nishan-E-Haider (Eng. lit. Emblem of the Lion) for his meritorious services, which was awarded to him by the President of Pakistan. The Presidential Nishan-e-Haider citation on his grave is written in Urdu; and it reads with translation as:

=== Citation ===
Battle of Pandu at Tripatra hill in Uri:

CITATION

CAPT RAJA MUHAMMAD SARWAR

2 PUNJAB REGIMENT

Battle of Tilpatra in Uri: When Quaid-e-Azam Muhammad Ali Jinnah declared Jihad in Kashmir and ordered Pakistan Army to participate in it. Captain Sarwar were participating in a course in GHQ's School of Signals. His unit 2 Punjab Regiment entered Kashmir to face the enemy. As soon as the course ended he persisted to take permission to participate in Jihad of Kashmir, with his unit which was granted. He was appointed as the signals officer. He offered to fight the enemy at Tilpatra hill. On 27 July 1948, he took his men with him and attacked the enemy. The enemy opened fire with machine guns, artillery and mortars. He kept on advancing. His machine gunner got killed. He took hold of his gun and attacked. When a second gunner arrived he handed over the machine gun to him. He, along with some soldiers, advanced from another side and destroyed a machine gun of the enemy and advanced There was barbed wire, which he cut himself and let the soldiers pass through it and led the assault on the enemy. During this time, a burst from the automatic machine gun of the enemy injured him. His actions in the battle of Tipatra led him to be posthumously presented with the Nishan-e-Haider.

In 1967, the Government of Pakistan established a marble tomb in his memory to offer remembrance of his military career highlights and martyrdom to Pakistani society. Additional funding was secured in 1990 by Imtiaz Warraich, the MP to expand the facility in Sarwars' memory.

== In memory ==
On 22 April 1968, a paintings exhibition was inaugurated in Lahore, Pakistan depicting Pakistani war heroes including the first sketched portrait of Muhammad Sarwar.

=== Gallery ===
Tomb and memorial of Capt. Muhammad Sarwar
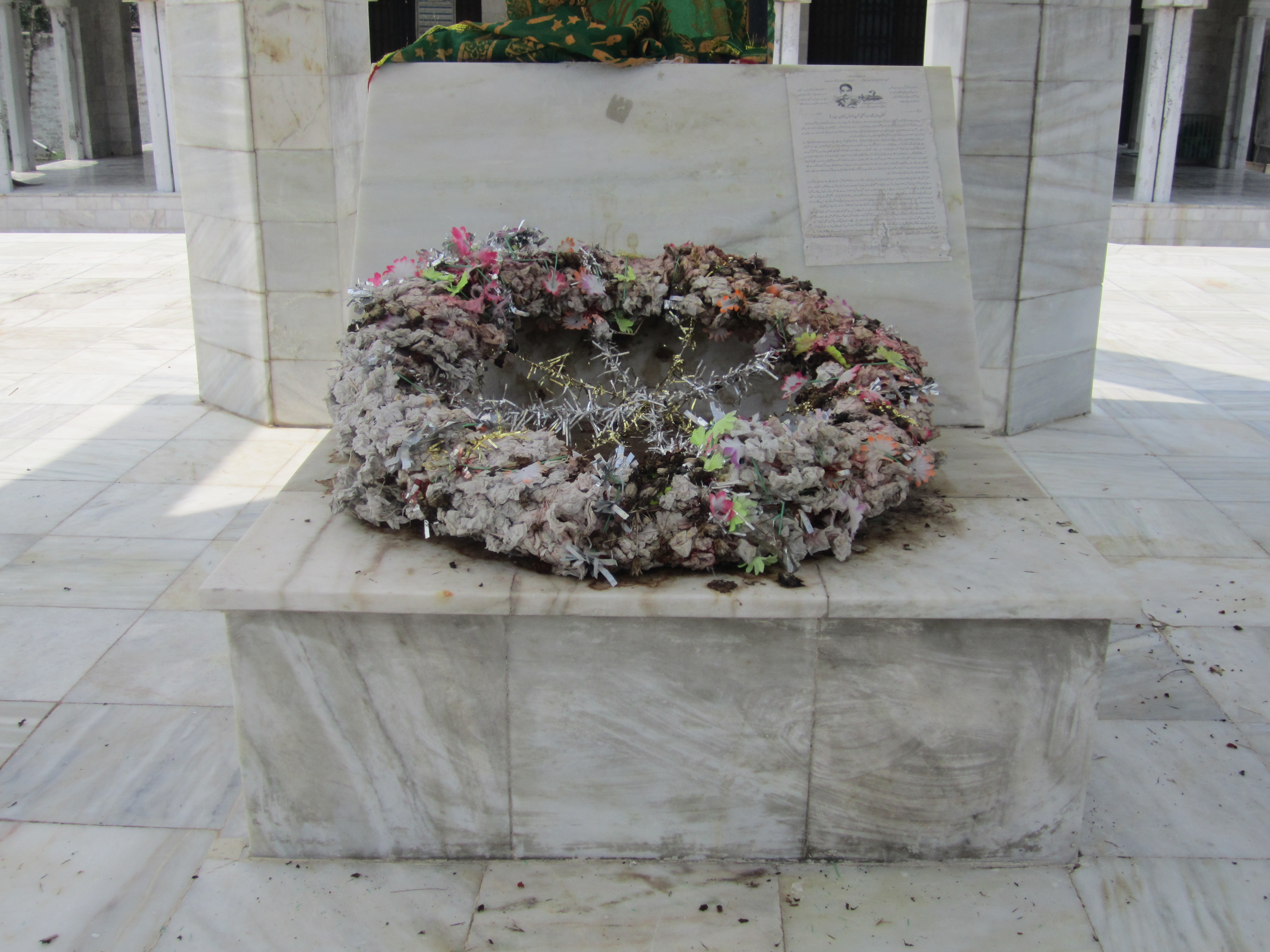
Inscription about the life of Muhammad Sarwar on his tomb.

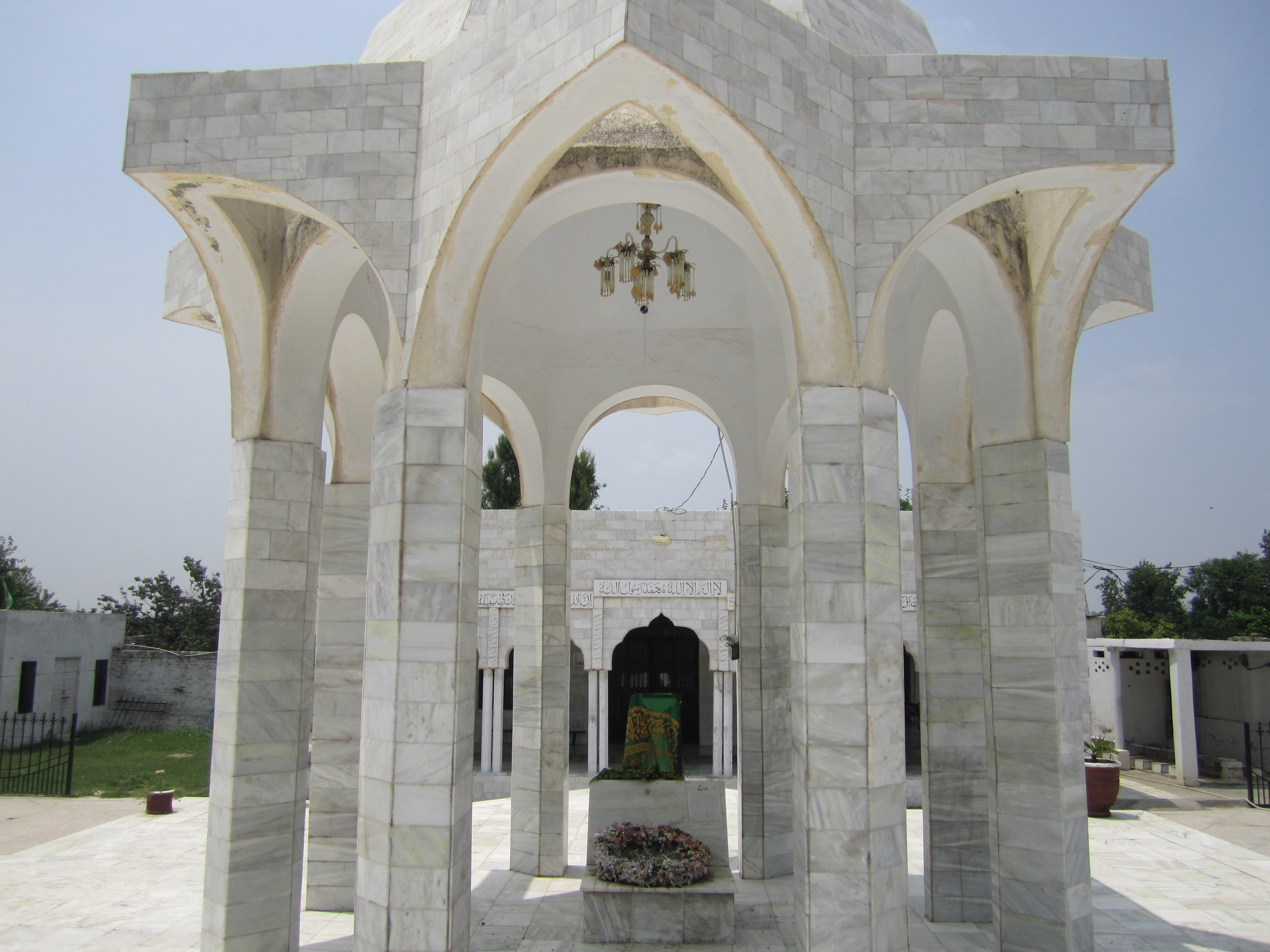
The memorial to Muhammad Sarwar Shaheed (Nishah e Haider) at his tomb.

== Awards and decorations ==
Nishan-e-Haider Recipient
- Date: Awarded in 1956
- Country: Islamic Republic of Pakistan
- Presented by: President Iskandar Mirza

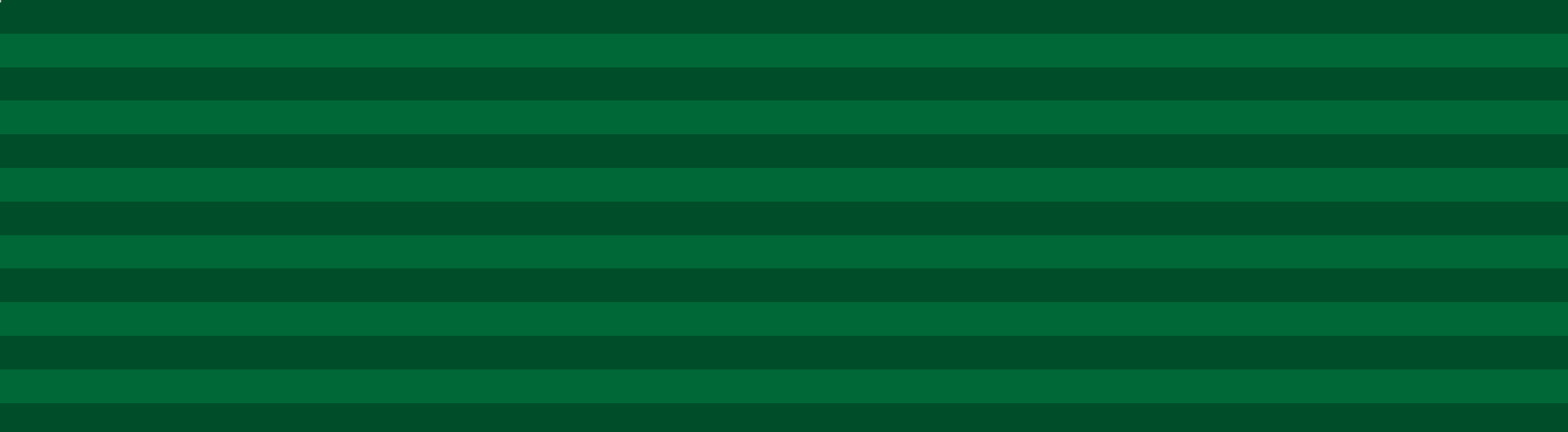

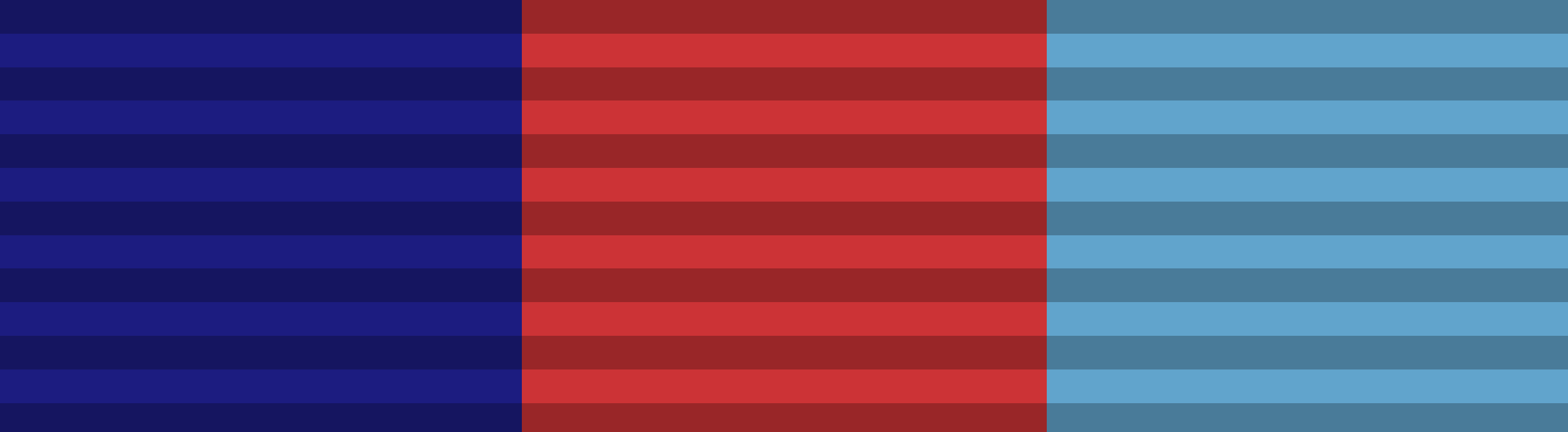

Nishan-e-Haider (Emblem of the Lion) 1947-48 War Posthumously		Pakistan Tamgha (Pakistan Medal) 1947	
1939-1945 Star	Burma Star	War Medal 1939-1945	India Service Medal 1939–1945

=== Foreign decorations ===
Foreign Awards
UK	1939-1945 Star
UK	Burma Star
UK	War Medal 1939-1945
UK	India Service Medal 1939–1945

== See also ==
- Sawar Muhammad Hussain Shaheed
