= School of Electrical Engineering and Computer Science =

School of Electrical Engineering and Computer Science may refer to:

- School of Electrical Engineering and Computer Science (University of Ottawa), Canada
- NUST School of Electrical Engineering and Computer Science of the National University of Sciences and Technology, Pakistan
