= Institute of Management Sciences =

Institute of Management Sciences may refer to:

- Institute for Operations Research and the Management Sciences, an American professional organization, which in 1995 became part of INFORMS, the Institute for Operations Research and the Management Sciences
- Institute of Management Sciences (Lahore), Pakistan, formerly known as The Pak-American Institute of Management Sciences
- Institute of Management Sciences (Peshawar), Hayatabad, Peshawar, Pakistan
- NUST Business School, Rawalpindi, Pakistan
- KIMS Keynesian Institute of Management and Sciences, Lahore, Pakistan
