= Pakistan Army Corps of Signals =

Pakistan Army's staff corps for computers & communications

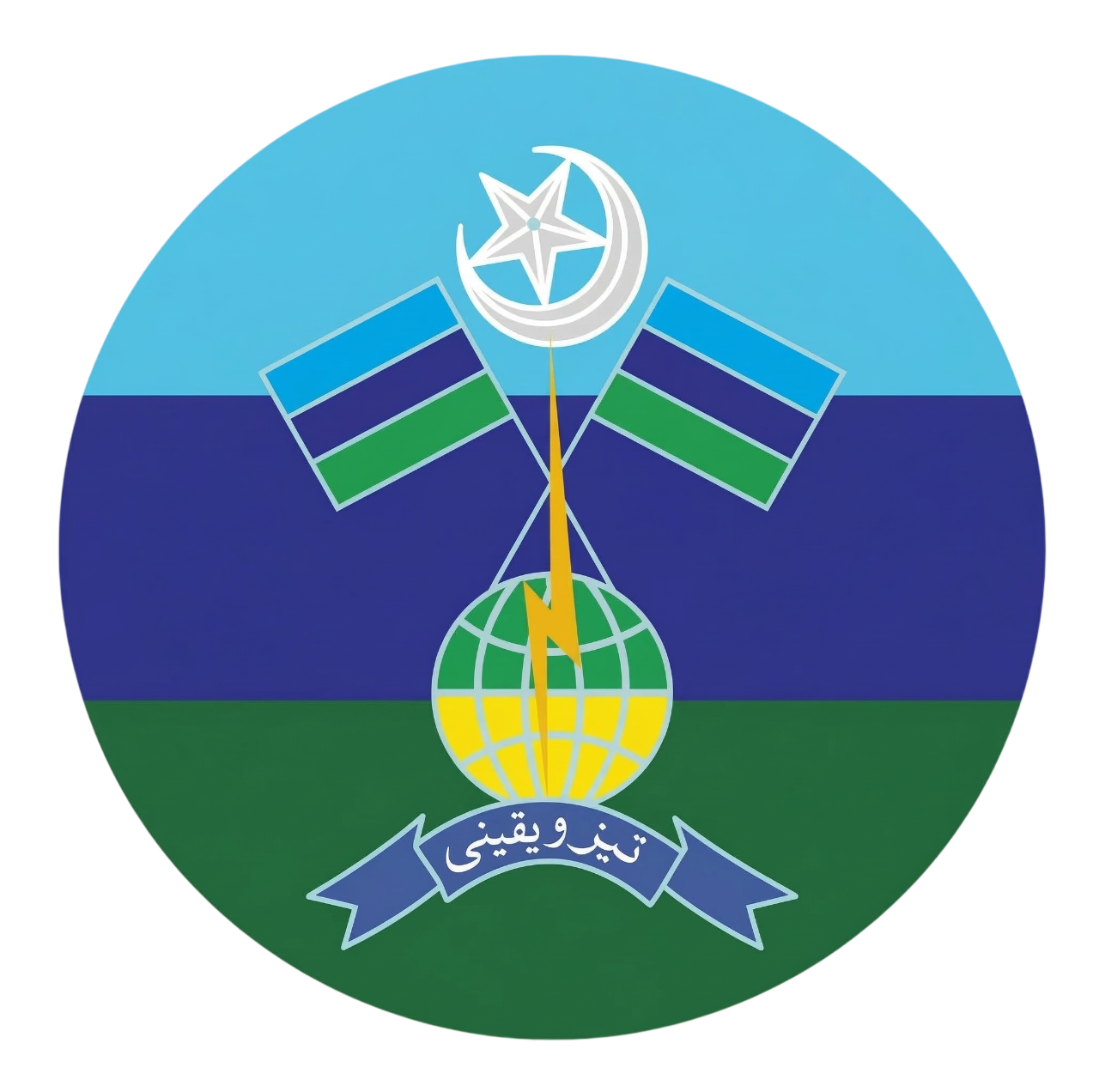
- Insignia of Pakistan Army Signal Corps
- Active: 1947; 79 years ago
- Country: Pakistan
- Branch: Pakistan Army
- Type: Combined and combat service support
- Role: Administrative and staffing oversight.
- Size: Varies
- HQ/Garrison: Army GHQ in Rawalpindi, Punjab, Pakistan
- Nickname: SIGS
- Mottos: Speedy and Reliable
- Colors Identification: Light blue, dark blue and green
- Anniversaries: 1947
- Engagements: Military history of Pakistan
- Decorations: Military Decorations of Pakistan military

Commanders
- Signal Officer-in-Chief (SO-in-C): Maj-Gen. Muhammad Ali Khan
- Notable commanders: Lt-Gen. Naseem Rana; Maj-Gen. Walter Cawthorn

Insignia
- Flag

The Pakistan Army Corps of Signals is a military administrative and a combined arms branch of the Pakistan Army. Headquartered in the Army GHQ, the Corps of Signals oversees the communications, information system, and computer security for the command and control of the joint and combined arms uniformed forces of the Pakistani military.

Since 2023 the Corps has been overseen by its Signal Officer-in-Chief, Major-General Muhammad Ali Khan.

== History ==
The Corps of Signals was one of the first administrative branches that was established on 14 August 1947 from the partitioning of the Indian Army. Its first signal officer-in-chief was Major-General Walter Cawthorn— an exchange officer from the British Army who was also a brainchild of the establishment of the Inter-Services Intelligence (ISI) in 1948. From the earliest years, the British Army's contribution to the Corps of Signals was vital when it assisted in building the Corps to working strength. Further training from the United States also strengthened the scope of the Corps through its interaction with the U.S. Army Signal Corps. With reorganization taken place on 23 March 1956, Major-General Obedur Rahman became its local first signal officer-in-chief.

The Corps also saw its first notable member when Captain Muhammad Sarwar was honoured for his actions against the Indian Army in 1947.

The Military College of Signals provides the necessary personnel to the Corps. The Signals Corps is structured with the numbers of regiments and battalions. As of its mission, the Signal Corps oversees the communications, information system, and computer security for the command and control of the joint and combined arms uniform forces of the Pakistani military.

The Signal Officer-in-Chief (SO-in-C)— the lead and reporting officer– works directly under the Chief of the General Staff (CGS) in its administrative capacity, directly reporting from the Army GHQ in Rawalpindi, Punjab.

== Units ==
BMT TRG: 1 TRG BN 2 TRG BN 3 TRG BN

- 1 Signals (Eman Ittehad Tanzeem)
- 2 Signals (Sab Say Awwal)
- 3 Signals (Barq Ul Basaas)
- 5 Signals Battalion (Voice of Valor)
- 6 Signals Battalion (Blitaz Bn)
- 8 Signals (Voice of Victory)
- 9 Signals (The Niners)(Voice Of Commd)
- 11 Signals (Poona 1930)(Al Yartad)(The Oldest)
- 12 Signals (Qasidan-e-Azb)
- 13 Signals (Thirteen Behtreen)
- 15 Signals (The Best).
- 16 Signals (F 16)(Raised at lahore)(Solah)
- 17 Signals (Qasdan E Kohsar)
- 19 Signals (Nineteen Behtareen)(Voice of Victory)(Voice of Independence)
- 20 Signals (Twenty The Trustworthy)
- 21 Signals (Patcom Pioneers)
- 22 Signals (Pascom Pioneers)
- 23 Signals ( Twenty Three Tension Free)
- 24 Signals (Shahsawar Signals)
- 25 Signals (Silver Streak)
- 26 Signals (CHABEES)(Fazl e Rabi)
- 27 Signals (Sawt-al-Qimam, Voice of Peaks)
- 28 Signals (Qasidan e Alamgir)(28 The Great)(ATHAEES)
- 29 Signals (Twenty Nine At

Glance)

- 32 Signals (Surkhru)
- 41 Signals (Qasidan e Chamb)
- 42 Signals (CPEC Communicators)
- 43 Signals (Har Waqt Bar Waqt)
- 44 Signals
- 45 Signals(Assaria)
- 47 signals (teezo yaqini)
- 49 Signals (Qasidan e Siachen)
- 50 Signals Battalion (Har Dam Tayyar)
- 51 Signals (A1)
- 52 Signals (Qasidan E Sehra)(Chattakh Bawanja)
- 61 Signal
- 62 Signal
- 63 Signal
- 64 Composite Signal
- 69 Signals
- 71 Signals
- 74 Signals (Silent Warrior)
- 76 Signals (Voice Hunters)
- 77 Signals
- 80 Signals
- 81 Signals (Jarrari)
- 82 Signal ( Qasidan e Johar )
- 83 Signals (Qasidan E Baqa)
- 84 Signals (MECH Communicators)(Voice of Desert)
- 86 Signals
- 91 Signals (Strike Sensor)
- 92 EW Signals
- 93 Signals

=== Independent Companies ===
- 367 Sig Coy
- 368 Sig Coy
- 369 Sig Coy
- 370 Sig Coy
- 207 Sig Coy
- 219 Sig Coy
- 245 sig coy
- 223 sig coy
- 423 Sig Coy
