= College of Electrical & Mechanical Engineering =

College in Rawalpindi, Punjab, Pakistan

Coordinates: 33.6°N 73.0333°E

- Other name: EME
- Motto: اپنا مقام پیدا کر
- Type: Engineering college
- Established: 1957
- Academic affiliations: National University of Sciences and Technology, Pakistan; Pakistan Engineering Council; Washington Accord
- Commandant: Asheer Mahmood Khan
- Faculty: 122
- Students: 2437 (~305 Cadets)
- Location: Rawalpindi, Punjab, Pakistan
- Campus: 124 acres (50 ha)
- Website: ceme.nust.edu.pk

The College of Electrical & Mechanical Engineering (CEME) (Urdu: برقی اور میکانی کالج) is a constituent college of the National University of Sciences and Technology, located in Rawalpindi, Pakistan. The campus is on the main Peshawar Road, near the M-2 motorway terminal.

The college is the main training institute for the Pakistan Army Corps of Electrical and Mechanical Engineering officers and enlisted ranks.

== Overview ==
The college is divided into two sections: Academic and Military. The Academic section falls under the supervision of the Engineering Services Group (ESG) - they are responsible for assembling the curriculum, making class schedules, and appointing teaching staff for Undergraduate, Post Graduate, and Doctoral Studies.

== History ==
On 1 April 1957, the College of Electrical and Mechanical Engineering was established at Quetta as EME School. In 1969, EME School was given the status of a college and civilians were also admitted. In 1981, a BSc program started at EME and a few years later in April 1984, EME moved to its current location in Rawalpindi from Quetta. From 1984 to 1993, it was affiliated with the University of Engineering & Technology, Lahore.

In 1977, the polytechnic institute at Peshawar Road, Rawalpindi, was closed down by Gen Zia-ul-Haq, and was converted into EME College.

In 2003, EME received ISO 9001-2000 certification. Its Ph.D. program started in 2006.

== Location ==
The campus is located on Peshawar Road, 13 km from the heart of Rawalpindi and 15 km from the center of Islamabad. It spans an area of 0.50 square kilometres (124 acres). The campus consists of training blocks, living accommodations for students, faculty, and staff, a stadium, auditorium, cafe, mess, sports complex, gymnasium, swimming pool, assault course, mosque, post office, bank, grocery store, and a welfare shop.

== Departments ==
- Department of Electrical Engineering
- Department of Mechanical Engineering
- Department of Computer & Software Engineering
- Department of Mechatronics Engineering
- Department of Basic Sciences & Humanities
- Department of Engineering Management

== Events ==
=== NERC ===
The Department of Mechatronics Engineering hosts the National Engineering Robotics Contest (NERC) each year. Students, enthusiasts, and hobbyists from all over Pakistan participate in NERC and compete using their robots in different categories. NERC is considered as the biggest robotics competition in Pakistan.

=== COMPPEC ===
The Computer Project Exhibition and Competition (COMPPEC) is hosted by the Department of Computer Engineering each year. It is a national level event with students participating from all over Pakistan.

== Student achievements ==
The Devrim II is the first-ever hybrid car in Pakistan, designed and fabricated by students of the National University of Sciences and Technology, Pakistan (NUST), in 2010. In 2012, students from the Department of Mechanical Engineering recorded a 72 km/L mileage for a road-acceptable mini-car at the Eco-marathon held in Kuala Lumpur, Malaysia.

The "Lipton Talent Hunt" contest organized by Unilever in 2013 was won by students of the Electrical Engineering department. In 2019, Team Pagri participated in the Agriculture Robotics Competition in China and stood second on a national level.

In August 2019, a startup called Respond.io, with offices in 4 different countries, with the Department of Computer Engineering as the CTO, along with two other co-founders from El Salvador and Canada respectively - raised $1.8 million (USD) to fund the development and innovation of their eponymous SaaS-based business messaging platform used by more than 40,000 organizations worldwide.

== See also ==
- National University of Science and Technology, Pakistan
- Pakistan Military Academy
- Army Medical College
- College of Aeronautical Engineering
- Military College of Engineering (Pakistan)
- Military College of Signals
