= Iqra University =

University in Pakistan

Iqra National University
- دانش گاہِ اقراَ
- Former name: Asian Management Institute (AMI)
- Motto: We are what we consistently do; excellence, therefore, is not an act but a habit. (Aristotle)
- Type: Private
- Established: 1998
- Affiliations: Pakistan Engineering Council, Higher Education Commission (Pakistan)
- Chairman: Hunaid H. Lakhani
- Chancellor: Erum Asad
- Vice-Chancellor: Nassar Ikram
- Registrar: Aseem Majid Rizvi
- Academic staff: ~250
- Administrative staff: ~500
- Students: ~85,000
- Location: Karachi, Sindh, Pakistan
- Colours: Klein, Denim, White
- Nickname: IU
- Website: www.iqra.edu.pk

Iqra University (Urdu: دانش گاہِ اقراَ) is a private university primarily with its main campus located in the Defence View area of Karachi, Pakistan. It has additional campuses in other parts of the city, in Islamabad and Hyderabad. Iqra University was ranked as the number 1 business school in Pakistan by the Higher Education Commission of Pakistan in the rankings announced in 2016. Iqra University also collaborates with universities of international repute for student exchange program.

== History ==
Chartered by the Government of Sindh, Iqra university was founded as Asian Management Institute (AMI) in 1998, by a group of Karachi-based industrialists. Later, the university name was updated to "Iqra University" after being granted the status of university by HEC in 2002. In 2015, Iqra University inaugurated its North Campus (named Iqra University North Campus).

It was ranked in the top three business higher education institutions by HEC in 2015. Also, the university has the largest research publication output of other higher learning institutions of the country.

== University management ==
The university was founded by Pakistani businessman Hunaid Lakhani, founding chancellor and Chairman, who served as the president of Pakistan Bait-ul-Maal Sindh.

Co-founder: Mrs. Erum Asad

Vice Chancellor / President: Dr. Nassar Ikram

Registrar: Mr. Aseem Majid Rizvi

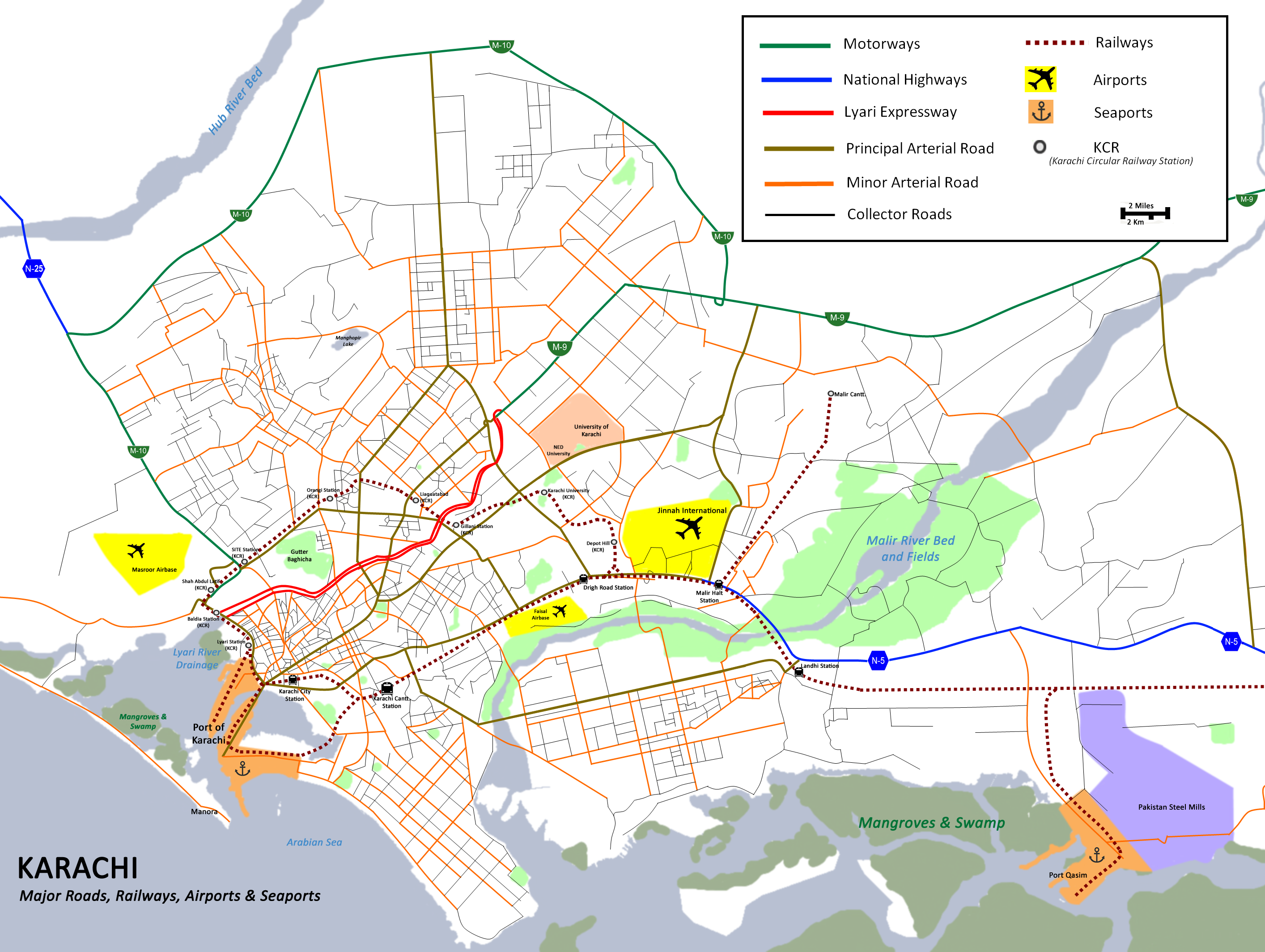
Location of Iqra University campuses in Karachi

== Campuses ==
=== Karachi ===
- Main Campus - Defence view, Shaheed-e-Millat Road
- Gulshan Campus 2 - Block 7, Gulshan-e-Iqbal
- Gulshan Campus Extension - Block 7, Sector 8 B Gulzar E Hijri Scheme 33
- Bahria Town Campus - Bahria town
- North Campus - Sector 7-B/1, North Karachi, opposite Muhammad Shah Graveyard.
- Malir Campus - Malir Halt, Airport road

=== Islamabad ===
- 5 Khayaban-e-Johar, Sector H-9/1
- Chak Shahzad Campus

=== Hyderabad ===
- A-26, Main Auto Bahn Rd, near Boulevard Mall, Hyderabad, 71000, Pakistan

== Programs offered ==
The university offers undergraduate, postgraduate, and doctoral studies programmes in engineering, film studies, management sciences, administration, and related social and natural sciences disciplines. University also offers associate degrees in different disciplines.

== Academics profile ==
University offers degrees in different departments.

=== Business Administration ===
==== Associate Degrees ====
- Digital Marketing
- Entrepreneurship
- Islamic Banking & Finance
- Tourism & Hospitality Management
- Accounting & Finance
- Commerce
- Sales & Marketing

==== Undergraduate programs ====
- Bachelor of Business Administration
- BS Entrepreneurship
- BS Accounting & Finance
- BS Economics & Finance
- BS Islamic Banking & Finance
- BS Media Studies

==== Graduate programs ====
- Masters in Business Administration
- Master of Philosophy

==== Doctor of Philosophy ====
- Ph.D. in Business Administration

=== Computer Science ===
==== Associate Degrees ====
- Artificial Intelligence
- Computer Networking
- Cyber Security
- Database Management System

==== Undergraduate programs ====
- BS Computer Sciences
- BS Software Engineering
- BS Artificial Intelligence

==== Graduate programs ====
- MS Computer Science

==== Doctor of Philosophy ====
- Ph.D. Computer Science

=== Engineering ===
==== Undergraduate programs ====
- BE Electrical
- BE Electronics
- BE Software Engineering

=== Health Sciences ===
==== Associate Degrees ====
- Counselling Psychology

==== Diploma programs ====
- Certificated Nursing Assistant
- Post RN BSN

==== Undergraduate programs ====
- Doctor of Pharmacy
- Doctor of Physical Therapy
- BS Human Nutrition & Dietetics
- BS Psychology
- BS Nursing
- BS Medical Lab Technology
- BS Anesthesia Technology
- BS Radiology Technology
- BS Optometry
- BS Ultrasound Technology
- BS Dental Technology

=== Education ===
==== Associate Degrees ====
- Education
- English Language Teaching

==== Undergraduate programs ====
- Bachelors of Education
- Bachelors of Science in English

==== Graduate programs ====
- Masters of Philosophy in Education
- Masters of Philosophy in English

==== Doctor of Philosophy ====
- Ph.D. in Education

=== Fashion & Textile ===
- BFD (HONS)
- BTD (HONS)
- BS FMM (HONS)
- M-DMM

=== Media Studies ===
==== Undergraduate programs ====
- Bachelors in Media Studies (Film & TV)
- Bachelors in Media Studies (Animation)
- Bachelors in Media Studies (Advertising)

==== Graduate programs ====
- Masters in Media Sciences (Film & TV)
- Masters in Media Sciences (Advertising)

== Information Resource Center ==
The Information Resource Centre (IRC) at Iqra University has around 80000 volumes on various themes, including all curriculum topics, professional reading material, and general reading material. One of the greatest sources of secondary data is the Information Resource Centre, which keeps an up-to-date database of government publications related to the curriculum.

== Rankings ==
Iqra University was ranked at no.01 in Business as per Higher Education Commission of Pakistan (HEC) rankings 2012. According to the HEC 2015 ranking, Iqra University was in the first position in Pakistan in the Business category.

Latest figures from ISI Thompson shown that IQRA University has published more research papers than the other top business schools of Pakistan. In 2011, Iqra University was ranked as the no. 1 among all private institutions.

In a meeting held on July 13, 2012, NCEAC-HEC (National Computing Education Accreditation Council of Higher Education Commission) has granted accreditation to the Computer Science Program of Iqra University for the batches graduating in the academic years 2008–12, 2009–13 and 2010–14. NCEAC-HEC also evaluated the quality standard of the said program and placed it into the top most ranking (W-Category).
