= School of Mechanical and Manufacturing Engineering =

Pakistani university

- Motto: Defining future
- Type: Constituent school
- Established: 2007
- Affiliations: National University of Sciences and Technology, Pakistan, Pakistan Engineering Council, Washington Accord
- Principal and dean: Javaid Iqbal
- Faculty: 41
- Students: 1274
- Location: Islamabad, Pakistan
- Campus: Urban
- Nickname: Bolts
- Website: smme.nust.edu.pk

The School of Mechanical and Manufacturing Engineering (SMME) located in Islamabad, Pakistan, is a constituent school of National University of Sciences and Technology, Pakistan. It was founded in 2008.

== History ==
In January 2007 the school started as Institute of Manufacturing Engineering (IME) in a hired accommodation in Sector F-11, Islamabad. The institute was established with funding from Islamic Development Bank. Fazal Ellahi was named acting director of the institute, and was charged with procuring the laboratory equipment. In May 2007, Dr. Abid Pervaiz Ghuman was appointed as head of the institute. The pioneering team included Dr Asar Khan, Dr Khalid Akhtar, Dr Shahid Ikramullah Butt and Dr Riaz Ahmed Mufti. The institute was renamed as School of Mechanical and Manufacturing Engineering in 2009.

Anticipating delivery of the laboratory equipment and realizing the need for space, the school was allocated a building in H-12 Campus of NUST in 2008, and SMME was also partly moved to the new location. Meanwhile, planning for the launching of Mechanical Engineering at undergraduate and Industrial and Manufacturing Engineering at postgraduate levels were undertaken. The approval of the curriculum was obtained from the Academic Council in 2008. MS in Industrial & Manufacturing Engineering and Bachelor on Mechanical Engineering curriculum was a combined effort of the team. Dr Khalid Akhtar headed the postgraduate curriculum and Dr Shahid Ikramullah Butt headed the undergraduate mechanical curriculum.

In August 2009, Dr Abdul Ghafoor was appointed as the head of the school and fully established in the H-12 campus of NUST. That October, with the induction of 40 undergraduate students of Mechanical Engineering and 13 postgraduate students of Industrial and Manufacturing Engineering, SMME became fully functional.

Since its founding, the school has added more programs and renamed others. SMME has four degree-awarding departments: the Department of Mechanical Engineering, the Department of Design and Manufacturing, the Department of Robotics and Intelligent Machine Engineering, and the Department of Biomedical Engineering. The school offers undergraduate programs in Mechanical Engineering and postgraduate programs in Mechanical, Design and Manufacturing Engineering, Robotics and Intelligent Machine Engineering, and Biomedical Engineering and Sciences. The school faculty is actively engaged in academic and industrial research.

Dr Abdul Ghafoor left in 2018 and the school was led by Dr Shahid Ikramullah Butt as dean/principal. Currently, Dr Javaid Iqbal is a working as dean/principal of SMME.

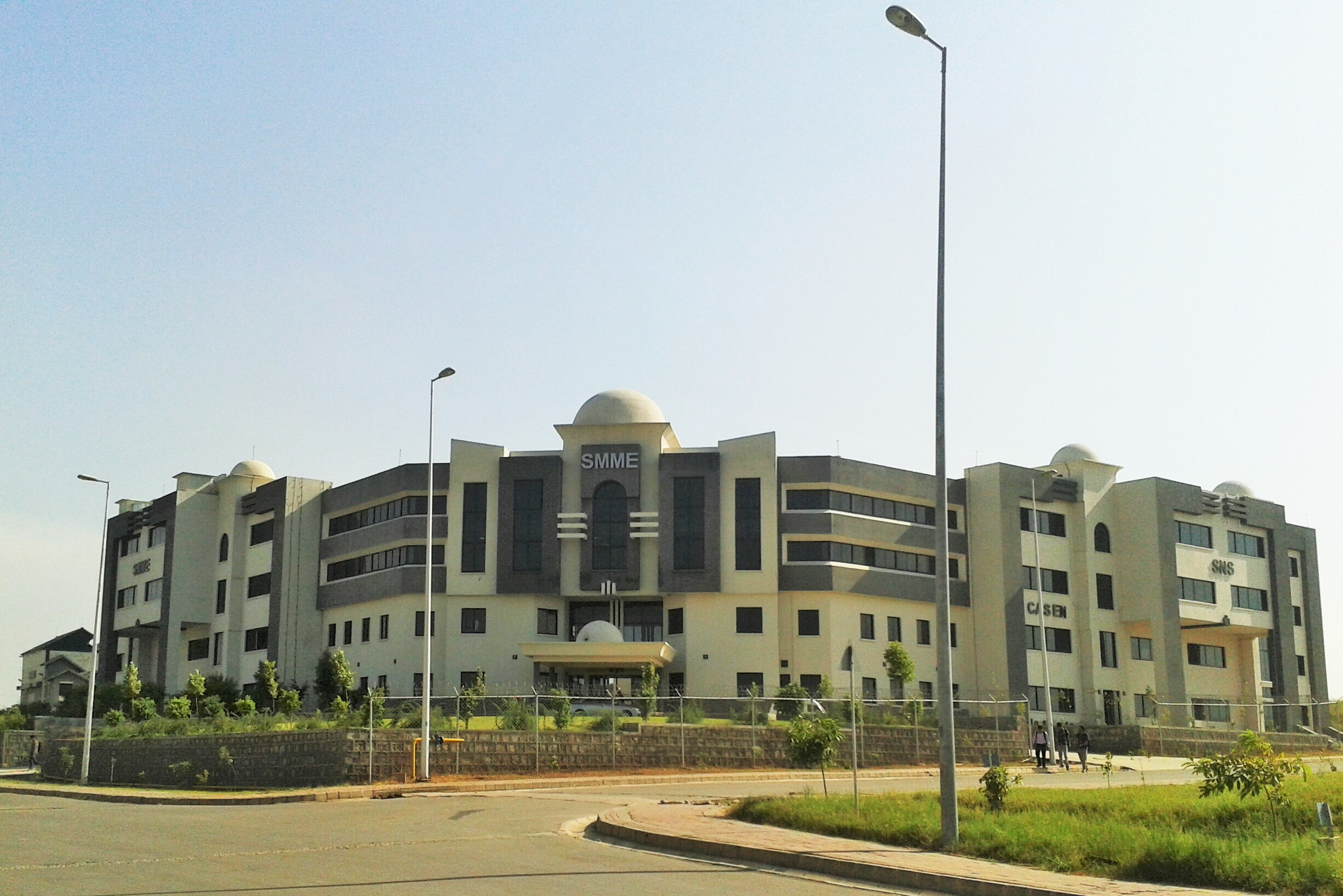
SMME, NUST, Islamabad

== Departments ==
The school consists of five main departments: Mechanical Engineering, Design & Manufacturing Engineering, Robotics & Artificial Intelligence Engineering, Biomedical Engineering & Sciences, and Aerospace Engineering.

The Mechanical Engineering department consists of 30 faculty members and approximately 600 undergraduate students and 120 postgraduate students. The mission of the mechanical engineering program is to provide students with the fundamental knowledge, skills and professional experience necessary for successful careers in industrial or academic roles. This provides a platform for students to study and perform in a challenging environment. The department is equipped with almost all laboratory equipment necessary for undergraduate and postgraduate studies in the area of mechanical design and thermal fluids.

The department of Design & Manufacturing Engineering started in 2009 with only 15 PG students. The department has Research labs including Rapid Prototyping having SLA abd FDM setups with reverse engineering technology with equipments loke Creaform 3D laser scanner, Minolta scanner, Faroarm with advanced software for designing and analysis. Digital Microscope is state of the equipment hiving results close to SEM. Metallograpfhy lab has all facilities for sample preparation to analyze meral structure. Laser engraving is an eddge along with CNC Lathe and CNC Milling machines for all kinds of jobs and research. Thermoforming machine along with Heat Treatment lab help to perform research and commercial jobs. Robotics and Artifial Intelligence engineering department was established in September 2011 as Pakistan's first academic initiative in the field of robotics and artificial intelligence. Mainly focused on postgraduate studies and research in robotics, mechatronics, machine intelligence, control systems, machine vision, and industrial automation, department faculty offer masters and doctoral degrees in the field. The department houses dedicated laboratories of robotics and intelligent systems engineering, machine vision, UAVs/aerial robotics, control systems, industrial automation, electronics, embedded systems, and computer-aided engineering whereas it is supported by the manufacturing resource center, rapid prototyping lab, and computer numerical control lab which facilitates mechanical fabrication of indigenously-designed robot prototypes at the school. These laboratories comprise equipment both for research as well as teaching purposes including mobile and humanoid robots, robotic arms of various types, stereo vision camera systems, robot designing kits, advanced microcontroller instrumentation, human brain–computer interface equipment, remote piloted helicopters, pneumatic/hydraulic workstations, PCB precision prototyping facilities as well as various models for experimentation into non-linear and adaptive control systems. These enable the student to get practical exposure to robotic technology.

The biomedical sciences and engineering department has masters of science degrees in biomedical sciences and biomedical engineering.
