= Hunaid Lakhani =

Pakistani politician and educationalist (died 2022)

Hunaid Lakhani (died 8 September 2022) was a Pakistani politician, renowned philanthropist, visionary leader and the founder of Iqra University.

Lakhani was a Pakistan Tehreek-e-Insaf (PTI) leader, and the chairman of Baitul Mal Sindh.

He died on 8 September 2022 at 49 years of age in Karachi.
