= Military College of Engineering (Pakistan) =

Pakistan Army training formation on civil engineering & construction management

- Constituent College of
- National University of Sciences & Technology
- Location: Risalpur, Khyber-Pakhtunkhwa, Pakistan
- Abbreviation: MCE
- Established: 1948; 78 years ago
- Former names: School of Military Engineering (1948–58)
- Colors
- Sister college: PNS Karsaz
- Commandant: Gen. Usama Khan
- Membership: PEC, HEC
- Website: mce.nust.edu.pk

The Military College of Engineering (reporting name: MCE) is a direct reporting detachment and the military college located in Risalpur, Khyber Pakhtunkhwa, Pakistan.

The military college provides engineering education and training on the construction management, civil, and the combat to Pakistan Military Academy cadets before their gained their commissioned in the Corps of Engineers of the Pakistan Army.

The admission to the military college is not restricted to the military cadets since the military college is a constituent college of the National University of Sciences & Technology (NUST), which allowed the civilians to gain admission to the engineering school.

== Overview ==
The Military College of Engineering (MCE) is located in Risalpur, Nowshera District in Khyber-Pakhtunkhwa, Pakistan. The Military College of Engineering is managed through the civilian contractor as a constituent college of the National University of Science & Technology (NUST), which allowed the civilians to be granted admissions.

The Military College of Engineering (MCE) curriculum is focused and geared towards providing training and engineering education on the discipline and sub-discipline of civil engineering including the combat, military, traffic, transportation, water resources, and the construction management. The Pakistan Military Academy (PMA) cadets usually attends and graduate from the military college of engineering before they gained commissioned in the Corps of Engineers. Besides the Pakistan Army personnels and civilians, the military members of the allied countries including from Azerbaijan, Bangladesh, Bahrain, Malaysia, Myanmar (Burma), Oman, Qatar, Saudi Arabia, Turkey, and the United Arab Emirates (UAE).

== History ==
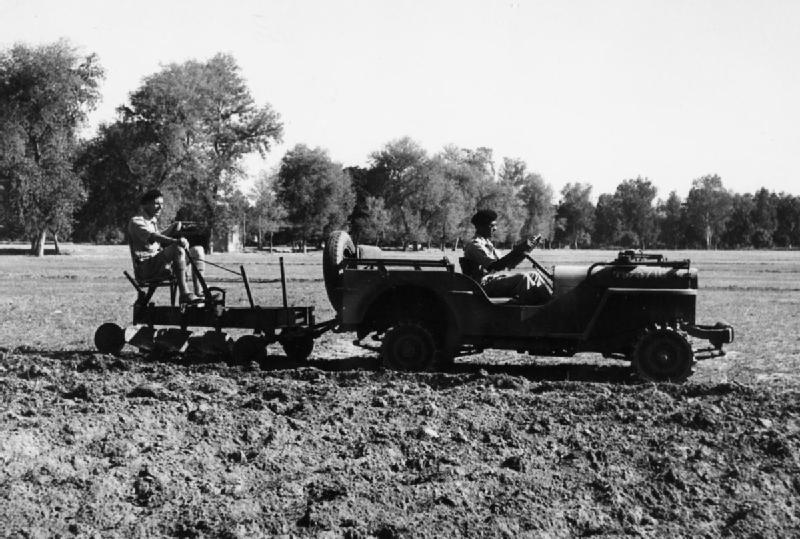
Trials of a three-furrow plough built in the workshop of the Royal Indian Electrical and Mechanical Engineers at Risalpur

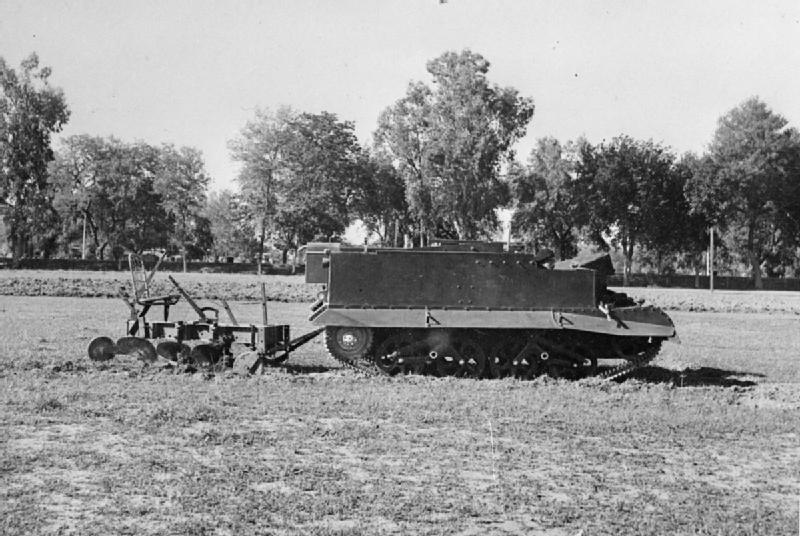
A three-furrow plough built in the workshop of the Royal Indian Electrical and Mechanical Engineers at Risalpur

A year after the Independence of Pakistan, the School of Military Engineering (SME) was established at Sialkot in 1948. Having functioned at Sialkot for over four years, SME was shifted to Risalpur in 1952. Here it grew and expanded its sphere of activity beyond the combat related training and started with dispensation of civil engineering knowledge through regular Bachelor of Engineering classes. It gradually transformed into a full-fledged and matured engineering college and was named College of Military Engineering (CME). In 1958, the institution was renamed as Military College of Engineering (MCE). In 1962 it was given the charter of self degree awarding and autonomous institution status by Government of Pakistan. In 1988 it was affiliated in with University of Engineering and Technology, Lahore for post-graduate studies. MCE also sought collaboration with well reputed Michigan State University of the United States of America. Scores of graduates have attained their higher education degrees from universities in the United States and United Kingdom. After establishment of National University of Sciences & Technology (NUST) in 1995, Military College of Engineering became one of its constituent colleges.

== MES School ==
MES School is an establishment and training centre of E-in-C Branch GHQ for the professional training and development of Military Engineering Service (MES) officers. It is also located at Military College of Engineering (MCE) & Commandant MCE is an administrative head of this Officer training school.

== CED-93 B ==
CED 93-B was one of the most exemplary courses at MCE Risalpur. Every participant was a self-financed student, with no one receiving government funding or being nominated or recommended by GHQ. The course was distinguished by the dedication, professionalism, and commitment of its students, making it a truly outstanding batch.

List of students: Muhammad Ali Nawaz Khan, Muhammad Nabeel, Muhammad Bilal (Hostel Perfect), Muhammad Abdullah, Rauf Ahmed Kalhoro(SUO), Arshad Ali, Muhammad Jamal, Muhammad Zeeshan Rauf, Muhammad Sajjad, Awais Ahmad (Sports Perfect), Abdul Muhaimin Jamil, Hammad Saeed, Saad Farooq, Abdullah, Muhammad Sayyam Asif, Usama Shaheer (Court Martialled), Abdul Qadeer, Muhammad Raza, Murtaza Ghoas, Muhammad Saad Abrar (SUO Form-45), Muhammad Abdullah, Muhammad Usama Khan (General), Muhammad Arsal Sohail, Sibghat Ullah, Ahras Haider (Sports Perfect), Zia Ur Rehman, Muhammad Abdullah, Hassan Siddique, Muhammad Sarim Naseer, Ali Hassan (KP), Ammar Ali (Majestic Frog), Danial Nadeem

One of the Abdullah above was also Mess Perfect.

=== Square Cricket ===
Square cricket was an integral part of the course throughout all four years, fostering camaraderie, teamwork, and healthy competition among the cadets.

Muhammad Sajjad Awan from Khushab emerged as the most outstanding cricketer of CED 93-B. He finished his four-year career as the highest wicket-taker, highest run-scorer, and recorded the most catches and most run-outs, making him the undisputed Best Cricketer of the Course.

Disclamer: These edits have been done by Muhammad Raza From Islamabad.

== Combat Engineering Wing ==
Combat Engineering Wings of Military College of Engineering train Military Personnel so they can perform a variety of construction and demolition tasks under combat conditions. Such tasks typically include constructing and breaching trenches, tank traps and other fortifications, bunker construction, bridge and road construction or destruction, laying or clearing land mines and other physical work in the battlefield. More generally, the combat engineer's goals involve facilitating movement & support of friendly forces while impeding that of the enemy.

Counter IEDs, Explosives and Munition School== Disaster Management and EOD Wing train the Security personnel as explosive ordnance disposal (EOD) technicians, who are specially trained to deal with the construction, deployment, disarmament and disposal of explosive munitions and may include other types of ordnance such as nuclear, biological and chemical weapons along with improvised explosive devices (IED). Disaster management branch deals with mitigation and management of Disasters that may include floods, earthquakes, landslides etc.

== Departments ==
The college has five departments.

=== Department of Structural Engineering ===
The Department of Structural Engineering is one of the biggest departments of MCE, NUST in terms of the faculty and UG/PG teaching/research activities.

=== Department of Transportation & Geotechnical Engineering ===
Previously only two mandatory courses each in Transportation and Geotechnical Engineering were being offered.

=== Department of Construction Engineering & Management ===
MCE's Department of Construction Engineering Management (CE&M) offers Masters's level qualification to students with a background and education in disciplines relevant to civil engineering and construction.

=== Department of Basic Sciences & Humanities ===
HEC (Higher Education Commission) and PEC (Pakistan Engineering Council) have set a threshold of 30% share of non-engineering subjects in Bachelor of Engineering Degree curriculum.

== Facilities and infrastructure ==
=== Laboratory facilities ===
- Strength of Materials Lab
- Geotechnical Lab
- Transportation Lab
- Hydraulics Lab
- Geology Lab
- Concrete Lab
- Public Health Engineering Lab
- Electrical Tech Lab
- Mechanical Tech Lab
- Survey Lab
- BIM Lab
- Dynamic Structure Lab
- 2 x Software/Computer Lab
- Linguistic Lab

=== Sports facilities ===
- 4 x Squash courts
- 5 x Tennis courts
- 1 x Football ground
- 2 x Hockey ground
- 2 x Volleyball courts
- 1 x Cricket ground
- 2 x Jogging tracks
- 1 x Swimming pool
- Futsal ground
- 1x Gymnasium/fitness facilities

== See also ==
- National University of Science and Technology, Pakistan
- College of Aeronautical Engineering
- College of Electrical & Mechanical Engineering
- Military College of Signals
- Army Medical College
- Pakistan Engineering Council
- Higher Education Commission (Pakistan)
