= Military College of Signals =

Pakistan Army training formation on signals & computers

- Constituent College of
- National University of Sciences & Technology
- Location: Rawalpindi, Punjab, Pakistan
- Abbreviation: MCS
- Established: 1947; 79 years ago
- Former names: Army School of Signals (1947–77)
- Colors
- Sister college: Navy School of Signals
- Freshman dorm: Companies
- Colonel-Commandant: Sajjad Haider
- Membership: PEC, HEC
- Website: mcs.nust.edu.pk

The Military College of Signals (reporting name: MCS) is a direct reporting detachment and the military college located in Rawalpindi, Punjab, Pakistan.

The military college provides training and engineering education on signals intelligence and processing, cryptography, cyber security, computers, electronics, and telecommunication engineering for its cadets to be commissioned in the Corps of Signals of the Pakistan Army.

However, the admission to the college is not restricted as civilians can also apply and granted admissions to the college as the Military College of Signals is also a constituent college of the National University of Sciences & Technology.

== Location ==
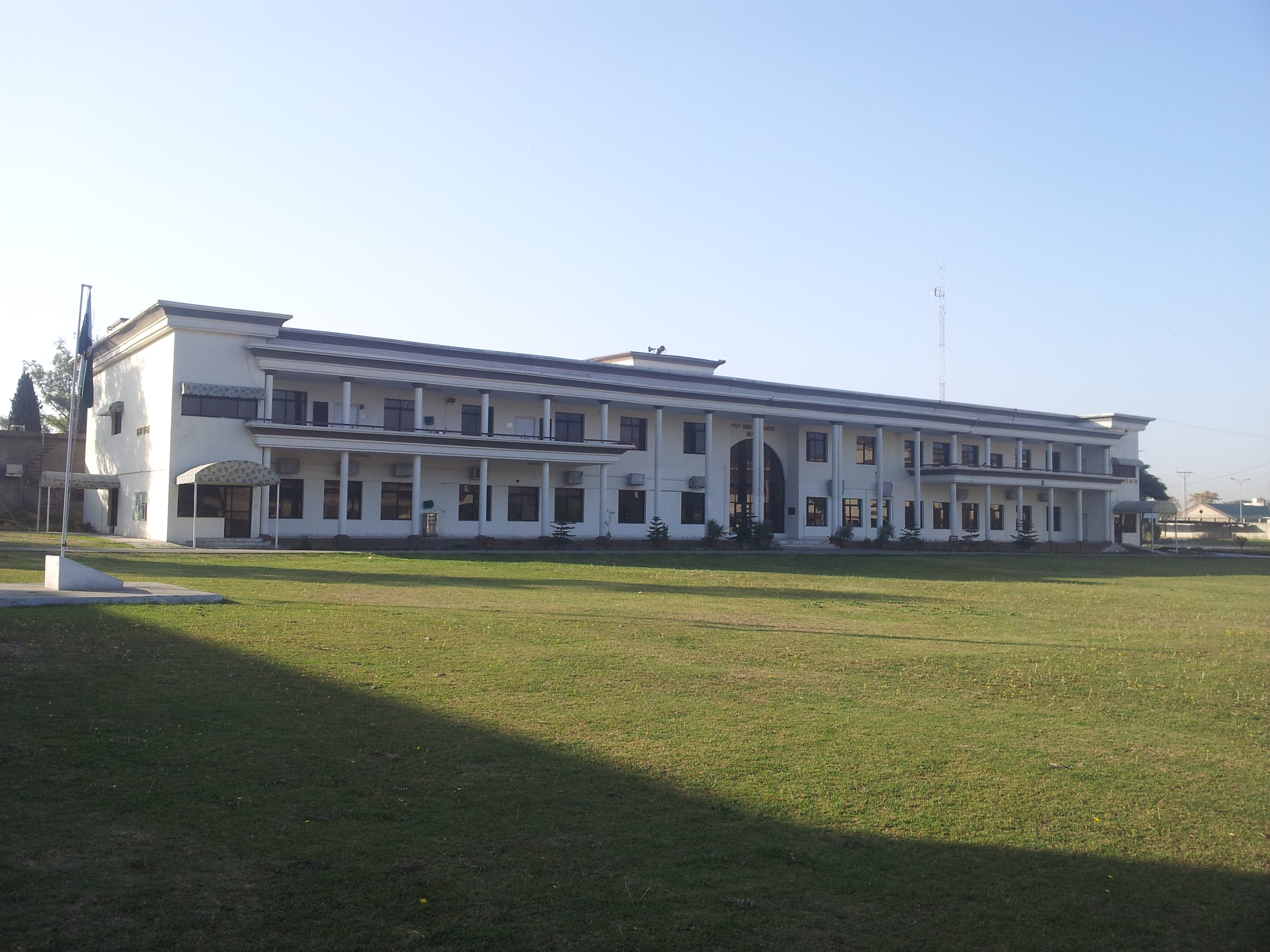
Military College of Signals

The Military College of Signals (MCS) is located in the suburbs of the Rawalpindi Cantonment, near the close proximity of the Chaklala Cantonment where the JS HQ is currently based in. The college is approximately 3 km (1.9 mi) from the Rawalpindi Railway Station with the nearby shopping center which is about 2 km (1.2 mi)

== History ==
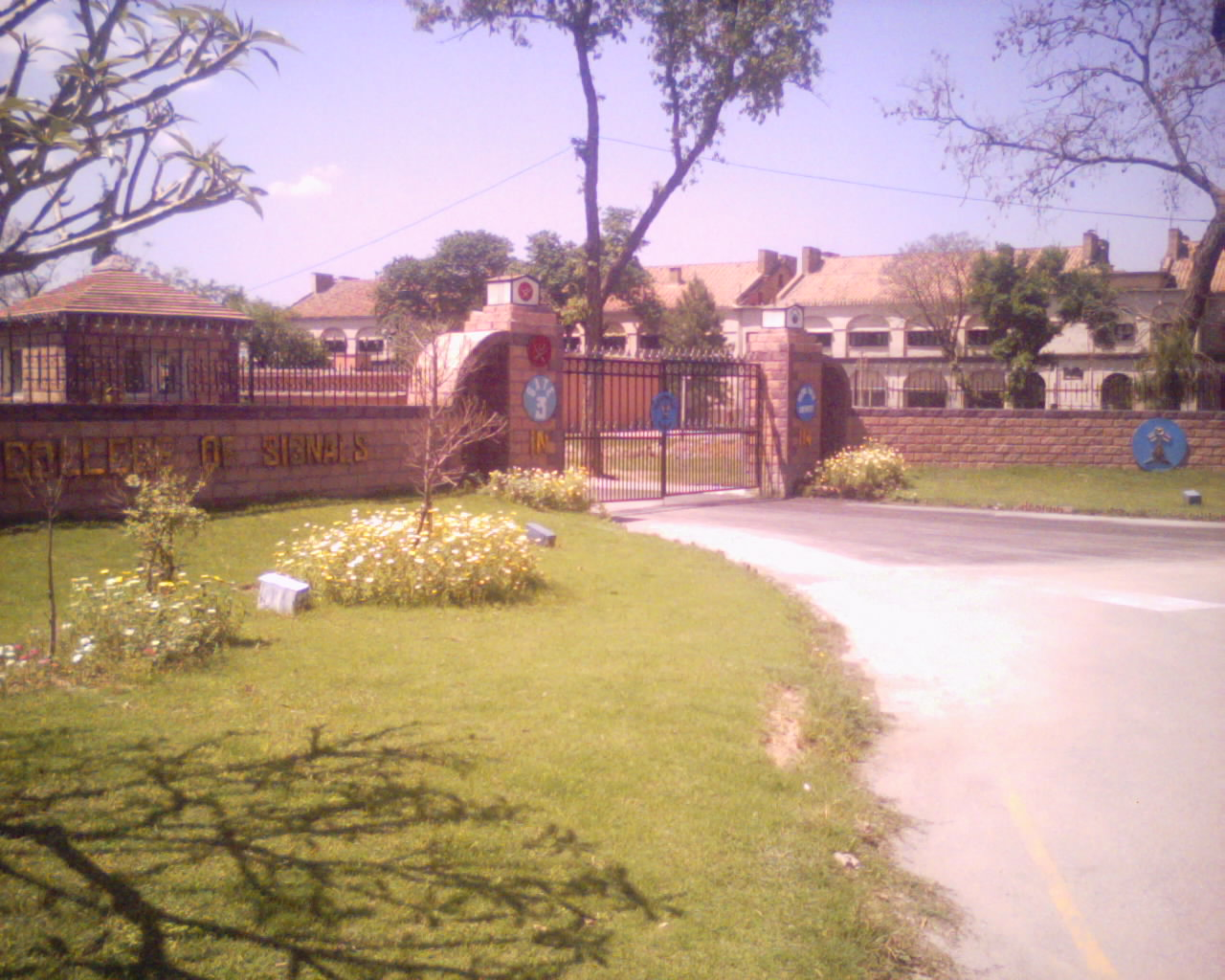
The famous Humayun Road entrance of the college.

The British Army administrators in the Pakistan Army established the direct reporting detachment to provide education and training on the signal intelligence in 1947 in Rawalpindi. Originally, it was established as "Army School of Signals" which was mandated with providing training to the enlisted army personnel before gaining commissioned in the Corps of Signals. It was one of the two school of signals in the country; other detachment known as the Navy School of Signals based in PNS Himalaya in Karachi coast.

The first commandant of the school was Lt-Col. C.W.M. Young from the Royal Corps of Signals of the British Army. Due to the absence of the training facilities in its early years, the Pakistan Army's enlisted members had to be educated in United Kingdom and subsequently in the United States Army's U.S. Army Signal Center at the Fort Monmouth, New Jersey, United States.

Since then, the Military College of Signals has gone various expansion phases to meet the service requirements of the Corps of Signals. In 1977, the Pakistan Army's Corps of Education upgraded its status from school to staff college when the military signed a contract with the University of Engineering & Technology in Lahore (UET Lahore) to help start the accrediting of degree programs in electrical engineering with sub-disciplines in signal intelligence, digital signal processing, electronics and telecommunication engineering as well as starting the teachings on the electrical and computer engineering to the army officers.

In 1991, the Military College of Signals became a constituent college of the National University of Sciences & Technology (NUST) and since then it has progressed phenomenally as a center of quality education. Today the curriculum is not only confined to merely undergraduate level but also MS and PhD level.

== Campus life ==
The Military College of Signals is managed through the civilian contractor through the National University of Sciences and Technology, Pakistan (NUST) though military discipline is evident in the Military College of Signals. It provides opportunities to participate in a variety of co-curricular activities. There are students' societies and clubs which organize different activities. Presently, the college has three societies, established in June 2001.

- Telecom Society comprises the President, General Secretary, Treasurer, Project Coordinator and Media Coordinator. Elections are held every year.
- Software Society comprises the President, Vice President, General Secretary, General Manager, Girls Representative, Extra-Curricular Activities Manager, Sports Manager, Finance Secretary, Event Secretary and EIT. This society on one hand has generated various extra curricular activities while on the other by organizing different seminars, workshops, lectures and short duration courses has contributed effectively to academic development.
- Information Security Society. This Society has been founded by the pioneer batch BEIS-01. This society comprises the President, General Secretary, Sports Secretary, Finance Secretary, Event Secretary. The main purpose of this society is to illustrate the importance of Cyber Security in this modern era. Society deals with all types of cyber-related seminars, workshops, and events held in MCS. In addition to this, the society's key focus is to help all the students of MCS to participate actively in all events organized by ISS.
- Community Service Society:

=== Companies (Dorms) ===
There are two military Companies for the Gentleman Cadets (GC)- the Liaqat Company and the Iqbal Company. For civilians, the Jinnah Company and GK hostel are for male students; the ]Fatima Company is designated for the female students.

== Students ==
There are seven different categories of students at college.

- Gentleman Cadets (GC)— the Pakistan Military Academy (PMA) cadets who are seeking commissioned in the Pakistan Army. Admission is given to the College after the cadets selection by the Inter-Services Selection Board and upon graduation, the cadets spend one year at the Pakistan Military Academy to complete their military training before commissioning to their ranks.
- NUST Cadets (NC)– The civilian students selected through the NUST entrance test (NET). No military training is required for civilians in this category.
- Paying Cadets (PC) — the Pakistan Army's enlisted Military person's off-springs have a special quota and they study in these institutions with some special discount and rebate. No military training is required.
- Additional Selected Cadets (ASC)– the retired military personnel or active-duty army personnel who later switched their careers in the military.

== Organization and Administration ==
The College of Signals is functionally and administratively controlled by the General Headquarters through Signals Directorate. It is headed by Major General/ Brigadier and is sub-divided into four functional groups.

- Administrative Wing (Adm Wing) Comprises Administrative Branch (Administration and Quartering Sections), Training Branch, NUST Branch, Examination Branch and MCS Training Battalion.
- Combat Wing (Cbt Wing) Comprises Tactical Branch, Telecommunication Branch, Security and Research Branch and Information Technology Branch.
- Engineering Wing (Engg Wing) Comprises Electrical Engineering, Computer Software Engineering, Information Security, Humanities and Basic Sciences Departments and Library.
- Research and Development Wing (R&D) Mostly focuses on research and development activities of the college.

== Academics ==
=== Undergraduate program ===
The Military College of Signals offers the undergraduate programs in three streams, namely electrical (signal processing), computer, software engineering signals intelligence (military-only), and the information and computer security. Before the fiscal year of 2019, the college was only offering the electrical engineering degree with telecommunications concentration; followed by introduction of the undergraduate degree in computer and information security in 2020. Each year a standard NET (NUST Entrance Test) is conducted for undergraduate enrollment in these courses, only open for the civilian prospects which they have an option to take the American SAT subject tests.

=== Graduate program ===
The Military College of Signals offers graduate studies in computer and information security besides marketing its graduate programs in electrical (telecommunications and signal processing concentration), software, computer, signal intelligence, and the system engineering. The College also offers the doctoral program (PhD) in electrical engineering. The civilian students are enrolled after passing the GAT (Graduate Assessment Test).

=== Departments ===
The college has four departments.

- Department of Computer Software Engineering (Al-Khawarizmi Block)
- Department of Electrical and Computer Engineering (Shuja-ul-Qamar Block)
- Department of Information Security (Naseem Rana Block)
- Department of Humanities and Basic Sciences (Sharif Block)

=== Faculty ===
The MCS has about seventy faculty members who are responsible for teaching both graduate and undergraduate courses. As of May 2024, Dr. Asif Masood is the acting dean of MCS. Dr. Adil Masood Siddiqui is the current Head of Electrical Department while Dr. Adnan Ahmad Khan heads the Department of Computer Science and Dr. Abdul Razzaque is responsible for heading the Department of Humanities and Basic Sciences. Dr. Shahzaib Tahir heads Department of Information Security while Dr. Naima Iltaf heads the Research department.

== See also ==
- National University of Science and Technology, Pakistan
- Pakistan Military Academy
- Army Medical College
- College of Aeronautical Engineering
- College of Electrical and Mechanical Engineering
- Military College of Engineering (Pakistan)
