= National University of Sciences and Technology (Pakistan) =

Independent Public Research University in Islamabad, Pakistan

Coordinates: 33°38′41″N 72°59′22″E

- Motto: Defining Futures
- Type: Public Research university
- Established: 1991
- Affiliations: Pakistan Engineering Council; Higher Education Commission (Pakistan); Washington Accord
- Chancellor: President of Pakistan
- Rector: Dr Muhammad Zahid Latif
- Faculty: 1,637
- Students: 12,468
- Undergraduates: 8,728
- Postgraduates: 3,740
- Location: Islamabad, Pakistan
- Campus: H-12, Islamabad (707 acres)
- Website: nust.edu.pk

The National University of Sciences and Technology (NUST) (Note: Urdu: قومی جامعہِ سائنس و ٹیکنالوجی, romanized: Qaumī Jāmi'ā Sā'ins va Ṭêknālōjī) is a Pakistani multi-campus public research university with its main campus in Islamabad and six other campuses in four cities (Rawalpindi, Risalpur, Quetta, and Karachi), covering all provinces, as well as 18 constituent institutions in total. The university offers degrees in multiple disciplines e.g., engineering, computer sciences, natural sciences, business studies, humanities, architecture, law, and health sciences.

The university offers undergraduate and postgraduate degrees, including doctoral and professional degrees. NUST was established in March 1991 to promote higher education in the country, especially in the fields of science and technology, and its charter was granted in 1993. All of its engineering programmes are accredited under the Washington Accord, as well as by the Pakistan Engineering Council (PEC). The main campus in Islamabad also contains Pakistan's first National Science and Technology Park, certified by International Association of Science Parks (IASP). As of 2025, NUST has over 12,000 full-time students enrolled and over 20 departments with over 1,637 academic faculty staff.

== History ==
=== Pre-Inception ===
After the independence of Pakistan in 1947, the training of military corpsmen became one of the top priorities of the new Government. In 1947, Military College of Signals (MCS) was established as the School of Signals. A year later, in 1948, the School of Military Engineering (SME) was established at Sialkot to train the corps in the field of engineering. In 1951, it was given the status of college as Military College of Engineering (MCE) and was shifted to its present location in Risalpur. On 1 April 1957, EME School was established at Quetta and in 1969, it was given the status of College of Electrical & Mechanical Engineering (CEME) and civilians were admitted. In 1962, Pakistan Navy Engineering College (PNEC) was established in Karachi. To train the members of the Pakistan Air Force, the College of Aeronautical Engineering (CAE) was established at Korangi Creek, Karachi in 1965. In the same year, the School of Signals was upgraded to a college. In 1981 an undergraduate program was launched at CEME giving it the status of a university. A few years later in April 1984, CEME moved to its current location in Rawalpindi from Quetta. In May 1986, CAE was shifted to the PAF Academy in Risalpur.

=== Inception ===
In March 1991, the Government of Pakistan established the National University of Sciences & Technology (NUST) for the promotion of higher education in the country, especially in the fields of science and technology. The first college to be affiliated with NUST was MCS in 1992. In 1993, the university was granted a Charter through a Presidential Ordinance, and CEME and MCE became part of the university. In December 1994 and November 1995, College of Aeronautical Engineering and Pakistan Navy Engineering College became constituents of NUST respectively. In 1997, the charter was converted into the National University of Sciences and Technology Act (Act No. XX of 1997) by the Parliament of Pakistan. In 1999, CEME and CAE attained ISO 9001 Certification, the School of Electrical Engineering and Computer Sciences (SEECS) and NUST Business School (NBS, formerly known as NIMS) were established. In 2003, the Center for Cyber Technology and Spectrum Management was launched in Islamabad. In May 2004, the Center for Advanced Mathematics and Physics was created. The School of Chemical and Materials Engineering (SCME) was established in 2006. In 2007, the Center of Virology and Immunology was developed to increase research in the field of medical sciences in Pakistan.

=== Establishment of main campus ===
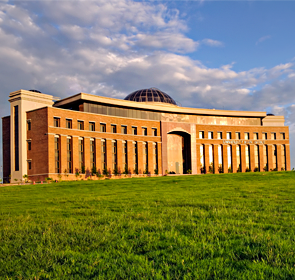
NUST Main Office at Islamabad Campus

In 2008, a new campus was developed in Sector H-12, Islamabad. Some old colleges such as SEECS and NBS were shifted to this campus and new schools were established such as School of Civil and Environmental Engineering (SCEE) and the School of Mechanical and Manufacturing Engineering (SMME). The School of Civil and Environmental Engineering comprises four constituent institutes: the NUST Institute of Civil Engineering (NICE), the Institute of Environmental Sciences and Engineering (IESE), the Institute of Geographical Information Systems (IGIS), and the National Institute of Transportation (NIT).

In 2012, NUST renamed the Center of Virology and Immunology as Atta-ur-Rahman School of Applied Biosciences to honor Prof. Atta ur Rehman, a highly distinguished scientist from Pakistan who has received several prestigious awards including Hilal-i-Imtiaz (HI), Tamgha-i-Imtiaz (TI), and Fellow of Royal Society (FRS) for his exceptional contributions in the field. In 2013, School of Social Sciences & Humanities (S3H) was established by combining departments of economics, mass communication, behavioral sciences and public policy. In 2020, Bachelor of Laws (LL.B.) degree was offered at S3H department in Islamabad, which was eventually established into a separate school i.e. NUST Law School.[11] In 2024, NUST School of Health Sciences (NSHS) was launched in its main Islamabad campus, with Bachelor of Medicine, Bachelor of Surgery (MBBS) and Bachelor's in Human Nutrition and Dietetics being offered.[12] In the same year, SMME also introduced Bachelor's in Aeronautical Engineering.[11]

== Campuses ==
NUST is a multi-campus university with the main campuses located in Islamabad. Campuses of NUST are located in the following cities:

=== Islamabad ===
Sector H-12 Campus

The campus in Sector H-12 Islamabad was initiated in 2008. Besides NUST Headquarters, the schools and institutes that were relocated to this campus include School of Civil and Environmental Engineering, School of Mechanical and Manufacturing Engineering, School of Electrical Engineering and Computer Science, School of Chemical and Materials Engineering, Research Center for Modeling and Simulation, School of Natural Sciences (formerly known as Center for Advanced Mathematics and Physics), Atta-ur-Rehman School of Applied Biosciences, School of Art Design and Architecture, NUST Business School, School of Social Sciences and Humanities, Professional Development Center, Technology Incubation Center, Marketing and Industrial Relations Organization, NUST Publishing and NUST Outreach and Talent Hunt Initiative. It also has a department for career counselling named Centre for Counselling and Career Advisory (C3A) that helps provide primary mental health facilities.

The campus is spread over 3.2 square kilometres (800 acres) of land. Sports facilities such as cricket, volleyball courts, basketball, football and squash courts are present while hockey stadium and tennis courts are under construction. Hostels for both male and female students are present inside the campus. Facilities in the hostels include badminton courts, basketball and gymnasiums. Some hostel rooms have attached baths while others have community baths. The campus recently inaugurated a central library next to the Headquarters, along with a race course track and a horse riding club. In 2017, a small hiking trail was also opened up for students in order to promote physical well-being. Various cafeterias are constructed on the campus to facilitate the students, along with a tailor shop, a barber shop and various bakeries and shopping marts. A Separate housing facility for the university staff is also present in the campus. Moreover, the campus also houses the NUST Science and Technology Park (NSTP). It also has a central gymnasium (along with several others in hostels) and a lake.

==== National Science and Technology Park ====
The National Science and Technology Park (NSTP) is located in SINES department. It was inaugurated in December 2019.

=== Rawalpindi ===
College of Electrical and Mechanical Engineering (CEME):

Located on Grand Trunk Road in Rawalpindi, College of Electrical and Mechanical Engineering (CEME) is the largest military constituent college of NUST. CEME's journey began in 1957, when it was established as the Electrical and Mechanical Engineers School in Quetta for the training of Pakistan Army's EME Corps. In April 1984, having stayed for 26 years at Quetta, the College moved to its present premises in Rawalpindi. CEME offers different undergraduate and postgraduate programs in mechanical, electrical, mechatronics and computer engineering fields. As of 2025, it has 2400+ enrolled students and 122 faculty members.

The campus includes all on-campus facilities, auditorium and conference hall, accommodation and mess facilities. The library is fully computerized, with a collection of 70,000 volumes. Sports facilities at EME includes three tennis courts, a basketball court, a squash court, a badminton court, football ground, cricket pitch, a swimming pool and two gymnasiums.

Military College of Signals (MCS):

Located on Hamayun Road in Rawalpindi Cantt, it is the oldest constituent college of NUST, founded in 1947 after the independence of Pakistan to train the members of Pakistan Armed Forces. It has three departments, namely Electrical, Computer Software and Information Security departments. The MCS library is computerized, with over 55,000 volumes. It spreads over 50 acres of area and is located in the heart of Rawalpindi Cantt.

=== Risalpur ===
College of Aeronautical Engineering (CAE):

The college comprises four departments; Aerospace Engineering Department, Avionics Department, Industrial Engineering Department and Humanities and Sciences Department.

Aerospace Engineering Department has five major labs; aerodynamics lab, structure lab, propulsion and heat transfer lab, material science lab and numerical analysis lab. Avionics Department has six labs which include guidance lab, navigation and control system lab, antenna lab, communication lab, radar, microwave and digital system lab and embedded system lab.

The campus is equipped with a library, auditorium, conference hall, dining facilities and hostel facilities, although more hostel accommodation is required for a conducive study environment. The college library has a collection of 80,000 technical and reference books. Sports facilities at the campus include table tennis, badminton, basketball, tennis, volleyball, football, hockey, swimming, golf and cricket.

Military College of Engineering (Pakistan) (MCE):

College of Civil Engineering and National Institute of Transportation are located on this campus. MCE is one of the oldest constituent colleges of NUST, founded in 1948. The campus houses laboratories, a computer centre, library with 41,000 books, sports facilities and hostels.

=== Karachi ===
Pakistan Navy Engineering College (PNEC)

The college campus is spread over an area of about 300,000 square metres (75 acres) comprising the administration block, four academic blocks, postgraduate studies center, labs and workshops, professional development center, an auditorium, a mosque, a dispensary, hostel and dining facilities. The campus is home to the Computer Aided Designing and Manufacturing Center and the Professional Development Center. While majority of the students are active-duty naval officers from all branches of the Pakistan Military, civilian students can also attend the school on merit-based admission.

=== Quetta ===
NUST Balochistan Campus (NBC)

NBC is located on Kuch Road, Quetta and was Inaugurated by Chief of the Army Staff General Qamar Javed Bajwa in September 2019. The concept of establishing NBC is to help the Government and people of Balochistan in the development of human resources by producing a quality workforce in the fields of Civil engineering, computer sciences, mining and mineral resources and, artificial intelligence.

The campus currently has 315 undergraduate students, 30 postgraduate students and 33 faculty members.

== Academics ==
=== Research ===
A Research and Development (R&D) Directorate is established at the NUST headquarters which encourages the growth of research in the university. All efforts of R&D Directorate are coordinated through an organizational structure consisting of NUST headquarters, R&D Cells at each constituent college and NUST's commercial arms. The mission of Research Directorate is to facilitate and co-ordinate research activities of NUST constituent institutions and to liaise with other national as well as international academics, research and industrial organizations to facilitate research at NUST. It has collaboration with various International agencies such as, USAID, British Council, UKAID, QNRF, TWAS, BP, NRG Bio-fuel Canada, German Academic Exchange Service (DAAD) and many others.

==== R&D cells ====
Each college, institute and center has an R&D Cell headed by a PhD qualified faculty member who co-ordinates, monitors and records all the R&D activities of the college. The head coordinates all the activities among departments, faculty members, researchers, students and industries identifying potential projects and sources of funds. Many innovations from NUST students are finding practical use in Pakistan.

==== NUST Consulting ====
NUST Consulting helps researchers undertake consultancy services with external agencies. In this regard, all centers are involved with NC to improve efficiency, reduce of wastage, increase productivity and improve quality.

==== Technology Incubation Centre ====
NUST has established a Technology Incubation Centre with an aim to combine industrial development and technological research together and establish the linkages between institutes and the industry. The Incubation Centre has been mentoring and hosting startups since 2005. TIC will also help faculty members in identifying the end users apart from commercializing of R&D output.

==== University research journals ====
The university publishes the following journals:

1. NUST Journal of Engineering Sciences, ISSN 2070-9900
2. NUST Journal of Business and Economics, ISSN 2073-994X
3. NUST Journal of Natural Sciences, ISSN 2072-4659
4. Pakistan Armed Forces Medical Journal, ISSN 0030-9648
5. TECHNOCRAT - Journal of Science and Technology, ISSN 1728-5690

==== University-industry linkages ====
The new campus established in Islamabad is co-located with Tech Town in Sector I-12 where IT and electronics related industries and technology parks are planned to be set up, so as to promote university and industry linkages. Apart from this, NUST is providing training and consultancy services to the industry and other business organizations.

NUST has also bought lab equipment needed for doctoral and postdoctoral research work, with financing through Islamic Development Bank (IDB). IDB has provided 26 Million US$ as grant for buying the services of researchers from abroad, over and above the programs of Ministry of Science and Technology, Pakistan.

=== Rankings and awards ===
University rankings

Global – Overall
- QS World: 334 (2023)
- THE World: 601-800
- USNWR Global: 950

Regional – Overall
- QS Asia: 74
- THE Asia: 150-200

NUST was the first university in Pakistan to achieve ISO 9000 certification. The constituent colleges that have been certified for ISO Quality Management System include College of Aeronautical Engineering, Military College of Engineering (Pakistan), College of Electrical and Mechanical Engineering, Pakistan Navy Engineering College and Military College of Signals. NUST won two gold and a silver medal out of three gold and three silver medals awarded by the Pakistan Engineering Council for 2005, 2006 and, 2007 for Best Graduate of the Year Award. NUST faculty members won seven awards, including President's gold medal, Best Researcher, Distinguished Scientist and Best University Teacher awards during 2007.

According to a survey, NUST is the most popular choice for engineering students in Pakistan. Google Trends show that NUST is the most searched Pakistani university ever since 2004 outranking some of the famous international universities as Sabancı University of Turkey.

In 2013, SCImago ranked NUST as 1568 in the world, 480 in the region and 6th in the country for the reporting period of 2007–11. In 2014, Webometric world university rankings ranked it at 150 in the world, 3rd in the country and 22nd in South Asia.

Higher Education Commission of Pakistan ranked NUST as the number one university in the category of 'General University: Large' in 2013 and in the category 'Engineering and Technology' in 2014 and 2015.

It was ranked by QS World Ranking's as among the 'Top 50 under 50' in 2021, and is ranked by QS as #353 in World University Rankings 2025, and #2 in Pakistan. It is also ranked by QS as #127 in the world in Engineering & Technology (#143 in Electrical, #164 in Computer Science, top 200 in Chemical, top 250 in Mechanical & Aeronautical, top 375 in Civil) and top 350 in Business Studies and Mathematics. In comparison to Pakistani universities, it is #1 in all Engineering subject rankings, #2 in Natural Sciences behind QAU, and #2 in Social Sciences & Management behind LUMS.

=== Foreign collaborations ===
International universities

NUST has developed collaborations with international universities to ensure two-way flow of knowledge. These include Stanford University, Iowa State University, University of Michigan, University of Central Florida, University of North Carolina at Charlotte, California Institute of Technology (Caltech), Cranfield University, University of Manchester, University of the West of England, University of Southampton, University of Surrey, Charles Darwin University, University of Melbourne, University of New South Wales, University of Queensland, Beijing University of Aeronautics and Astronautics, Nanjing University, Beijing Institute of Technology, Tokyo Institute of Technology, Technical University of Munich and Technical University of Denmark (DTU).

NUST has collaborations with universities in the field of medical sciences, such as Harvard University Medical School, New York Medical College, Virginia Cancer Institute, King's College London (University of London), Queen Mary, University of London, Imperial College London, University of New South Wales, University of Sydney, University of Queensland, Edith Cowan University and Trinity College Dublin (St. James Hospital, School of Pharmacy), Ireland.

Quality networks and associations

NUST is a member of the International Network for Quality Assurance Agencies in Higher Education (INQAAHE) and Asia-Pacific Quality Network (APQN). NUST has also been granted the membership of Association of Commonwealth Universities and International Association of Universities.

Other entities

NUST has the following international collaborations:

- Collaboration with CERN since December 2001. NUST has been awarded Associate Membership of CERN.
- Collaboration with Caltech on a project titled 'Interactive Grid Analysis Environment'. Research funding of US$0.18 million has been approved under Pak-US collaboration for this project.
- Collaboration with Stanford University since February 2004 in a project titled 'Measurement and Analysis for the Global Grid and Internet End-to-End Performance (MAGGIE)'. Research funding of US$0.162 Million has been approved under Pak-US collaboration for this project.
- NUST School of Electrical Engineering and Computer Science (formerly NUST Institute of Information Technology) has been declared Microsoft Authorized Academic Training Program Institute (AATPI) by Microsoft Corporation, USA.
- Intel Corporation has established a computer lab at SEECS.
- NCR Corporation has established their Data warehouse and Data mining lab at SEECS.
- IBM has registered NUST on worldwide offering for higher education to selected universities.
- Artificial Intelligence R&D Lab has been set up in NUST School of Electrical Engineering and Computer Science (SEECS) in collaboration with German Research Centre for Artificial Intelligence (German DFKI) and University of Kaiserslautern (TUKL), Germany.

== Student life ==
The institute offers opportunities for students to participate in technical and professional societies. Study trips to industries and organizations are arranged, guest speakers from institutes and industry are invited and seminars and workshops are held. Sports facilities are available in all campuses.

Student Bodies

Student run organizations, societies and clubs are present in almost all the NUST campuses. These include Computer Society of Pakistan - NUST Chapter, NUST Community services club, a community service student-run body TABA - NUST Chapter, NUST Skill Development Club, NUST Volunteer Club, NUST Science Society, NUST Deep Learning Society, NUST Adventure Club, Literary Circle, Book Club, Fine Arts Club, Innovation and Entrepreneurship Society, Media (Photography) Club, Pakistan, Innovation Society, Debating Society, Aeromodelling Club, NUST Environment Club, Telecom Society, Software Society, IT Club, Automobile Club and Sports Club. Deep Sea Diving and Sailing Club is available for the students of the Pakistan Navy Engineering College in Karachi.

Sports facilities

All the campuses have their own sports facilities. Courts for indoor games and activities such as table tennis, badminton and squash are available in almost all campuses. Tennis, basketball and volleyball courts, hockey, football and cricket grounds are also present in all the main campuses. Some colleges have swimming pools and gymnasiums.

Student residence

Separate hostels for boys and girls are available in most colleges and is at various stages of completion in the rest. Students of College of Aeronautical Engineering (CAE) are provided separate accommodations, while students at Military College of Signals (MCS), College of Electrical and Mechanical Engineering (CEME) and Army Medical College (AMC) are placed in the newly constructed dormitories at the campus. Pakistan Navy Engineering College has sufficient hostel facilities for both male and female students. The H-12 campus of NUST also has separate hostels for boys and girls. These include Attar, Ghazali, Razi, Rumi, Zakria and Hajweri hostels for boys and Fatima, Zainab, Khadija and Ayesha hostels for girls. Dining and mess facilities are located in all campuses.

Cafeterias

There are four main cafeterias on the main campus built to accommodate the student's need to refuel themselves namely C-1, C-2, C-3 and C-4. C-1 (Concordia-1) & C-2 (Concordia-2) are properly built round structures that have everything from a cafeteria to a juice shop, a stationery shop, a bakery, a print shop etc. C-3 provides scenic views of the sports complex at NUST. C-4 is mostly limited to students of SNS and SMME who are farthest away from all other cafeterias. Other cafes include 'Margalla Cafe', which is an outdoor space just besides SADA, 'Coffee Lounge', famous for its Chinese food and Arabic-style shawarma, 'Retro Cafe', situated next to the boys' hostels, among various others.

== People ==
=== Faculty ===
Notable faculty of NUST is as follows:

- Dr. Usman Qamar, a recipient of Tamgha-i-Imtiaz.
- Dr. Salman Raza Naqvi, a recipient of Tamgha-i-Imtiaz.
- Dr. Usman Akram, a recipient of Tamgha-i-Imtiaz.
- Dr. Haider Abbas, a recipient of Tamgha-i-Imtiaz.
- Dr. Rafia Mumtaz, a recipient of HEC Best Teacher Award in 2022 and member of Prime Minister's Task Force.
- Dr. Yasar Ayaz, a recipient of Pride of Performance award which is the highest literary award of Pakistan.
- Dr. Faisal Shafait, a recipient of Pride of Performance award.
- Dr. Umar Shahbaz, a recipient of Pride of Performance award.

=== Notable alumni ===
NUST has a strong alumni network of more than 41,000 graduates (31,000+ undergraduate, 10,000+ master's and 400+ PhD graduates). Notable alumni are as follows:

- Dr. Sarah Qureshi (Graduate of CEME. 2000), recipient of Tamgha-i-Imtiaz and CEO of Aero Engine Craft.
- Abdullah Qureshi (Graduate of S3H), Pakistani singer.
- Yashal Shahid (Graduate of SCME, 2019), Pakistani singer.
