= NUST Business School =

- Motto: "Educating Tomorrow's Business Leaders"
- Type: Business school
- Established: 1999
- Affiliations: National University of Sciences and Technology, Pakistan
- Dean: Dr. Naukhez Sarwar
- Location: Islamabad, Pakistan
- Campus: Urban
- Nickname: NBS
- Website: nust.edu.pk/INSTITUTIONS/Schools/NBS

The NUST Business School (NBS), formerly known as the National Institute of Management Sciences (NIMS), is the business school of National University of Sciences and Technology, Pakistan (NUST).

It was established in 1999 as the National Institute of Management Sciences (NIMS) and was later renamed to NUST Business School (NBS) in 2008.

== Departments ==
- Department of International Business and Marketing
- Department of Finance and Investment
- Department of Human Resource Management
- Department of Operations & Supply Chain

== Degree programs ==
NBS offers degrees at undergraduate, graduate and postgraduate level.

- Undergraduate Programs
  - Bachelor of Business Administration (BBA)
  - BS Accounting and Finance
  - BS Tourism and Hospitality Management
- Graduate Programs
  - Master of Business Administration (MBA)
  - Executive MBA
  - MS Human Resource Management
  - MS Innovation and Entrepreneurship
  - MS Marketing
  - MS Logistics and Supply Chain Management
- Postgraduate Programs
  - PhD Business Administration
  - PhD Business Finance
