= NUST School of Electrical Engineering and Computer Science =

Engineering institute in Pakistan

- Motto: A Center of Excellence for Quality Education and Research
- Type: constituent school
- Established: April 1999
- Principal: Dr. Muhammad Ajmal Khan
- Location: Islamabad, Pakistan
- Affiliations: National University of Sciences and Technology, Pakistan, Pakistan Engineering Council, Washington Accord
- Website: seecs.nust.edu.pk

NUST School of Electrical Engineering and Computer Science (NUST-SEECS), formerly NUST Institute of Information Technology, is a constituent school in Islamabad, Pakistan. It was created on a self-financed basis in April 1999 as a constituent college of National University of Sciences and Technology, Pakistan (NUST). The formation of NUST was prompted by the growing need for high-caliber IT instruction in the country and the necessity for the institution to establish its own IT division.

== Degree programs ==
The school is split into two departments offering programs in both graduate and undergraduate levels.

- Department of Electrical Engineering
  - Bachelor's in Electrical Engineering
  - Master's in Communication and Computer Security
  - MS/Ph.D in Electrical Engineering
- Department of Computing
  - Bachelors in Software Engineering
  - Bachelors in Computer Science
  - MS/Ph.D in Computer Science
  - MS in Information Security
  - Master's in Information Technology
  - Ph.D in Information Technology

== Research Groups and Labs ==
=== Information Processing and Transmissions Lab (IPT) ===
IPT Lab focuses on the intersectional areas of communications theory, signal processing theory and applied mathematics. The current focus of the IPT lab is the design of 5G/6G Wireless communication algorithms with a variety of allied areas such as IOT, networking, statistical signal processing and estimations & detection etc.

=== System Analysis and Verification Lab (SAVe) ===
System Analysis and Verification Lab, SAVe, focuses research on using formal methods, which are based on mathematical techniques and, thus, unlike simulation, ensure complete results, for the analysis and verification of hardware, software, and embedded systems.

=== Data Engineering for Large-Scale Applications (DELSA) ===
The Data Engineering for Large-Scale Applications, DELSA, research group explores semantics, databases, and interoperable systems in scientific and business domains. The research group aims at broadening the focus of database and data management techniques beyond their traditional scope.

=== Smart Machines And Robotics Technology (SMART) Lab ===
SMART Lab is currently working on developing a training system for laparoscopic and robotic surgery together with Holy Family Hospital, Pakistan. Other areas of research include simulator design, intelligent robots and vision-based algorithms for mobile robots. Some projects include a speech controlled robotic arm, an autonomous robotic platform and a robotic soccer environment for LEGO Mindstorms.

=== Research laboratory for Communication, Networks & Multimedia (Connekt) ===
Research laboratory for Communication, Networks & Multimedia, Connekt, addresses research problems arising in three areas: Multimedia Communications, Wireless Networks and the Internet. Areas of particular interest include networking, Applied Information Theory and Network Performance Analysis. The Lab's current research interest spans the theory and design of novel algorithms and frameworks for reliable multimedia transmission, processing and ubiquitous communication over Internet and wireless networks.

=== TUKL NUST Research and development lab ===
Established on the model of German Research Center for Artificial Intelligence (DFKI), which serves as a role model for creating world-class on-campus research center.

== International Collaborations ==
SEECS has developed partnerships with a number of international companies including Microsoft which has awarded NUST the status of Authorized Academic Training Program Institute (AATPI), Intel and other educational organization such as ACM (Associate of Computing Machinery), IEEE and IAESTE.

SEECS also has been awarded the status of "Associate Research Institute" of CERN, the European Organization for Nuclear Research in Geneva, Switzerland. Since 2000, NUST-SEECS has been working on collaborative on distributed computing problems relating to GRID problems.

== Other Activities ==
In February 2014, SEECS signed an agreement with Pak-Finland council to cooperate in the fields of healthcare, energy, IT, and telecommunication. In March 2014, SEECS launched a greenhouse center with to promote entrepreneurship activities in the campus.

It also aspires to establish the initial science and technology park in Pakistan with the objective of enhancing the connections between academia, researchers, and the industrial sector.

== See also ==
National University of Sciences and Technology, Pakistan
