= College of Aeronautical Engineering =

School of Aerospace and Mechanical Engineering

Coordinates: 34.0601°N 71.97980°E

- Motto: "Ilm-o-Amal, Jehd-e-Musalsal" (Knowledge and Practice, the Continuous Struggle)
- Established: 1965
- Affiliations: National University of Sciences and Technology, Pakistan, Pakistan Engineering Council
- Commandant: Dr Liaqat Ali Khan
- Location: Risalpur, Khyber Pakhtunkhwa, Pakistan
- Website: cae.nust.edu.pk

The College of Aeronautical Engineering (CAE) is an institution for education of Aeronautical Engineering in Pakistan located at the National University of Sciences and Technology, Risalpur (Campus), Khyber Pakhtunkhwa, Pakistan. It is a constituent college of National University of Sciences and Technology, Pakistan (NUST).

== History ==
The college was set up in 1965 at Korangi Creek, Karachi. In 1986, the college moved to its current location at Risalpur. It was previously attached with Karachi University and has been a part of NUST since 1994.

== Academics ==
The college offers undergraduate programs in Aerospace and Avionics Engineering. It got ISO-9001 certification in 1999. The college has five academic departments – Aerospace Engineering, Avionics Engineering, Industrial Engineering, Humanities and Science and Professional Continuing Education.
