= Rachna =

Rachna or Rachana means a literary or other work in Sanskrit.

Rachna may also refer to:

== People ==
- Rachana Banerjee (born 1974), Indian Film actress
- Rachana Narayanankutty (born 1983), Indian Film actress.
- Rachna Khatau (born 1981), Indian-American film and stage actress
- Rachna Korhonen, American diplomat
- Rachna Singh, Canadian politician and trade unionist
- Rachna Shroff (1979–2026), American doctor and oncologist

== Places ==
- Rachana, a village in the district of Batroun, North Lebanon
- Rachna Doab, a region in Punjab

== Other uses ==
- Rachana (film), a 1983 Indian Malayalam-language film by Mohan
- Rachana (butterfly), a genus of butterflies
- Rachana (typeface), a Malayalam typeface
- Rachna Engineering University, a university located in Gujranwala, Punjab, Pakistan
