= Electronic Government Directorate (Pakistan) =

Defunct Electronic Government department of Pakistan

Electronic Government Directorate of Pakistan was established in October 2002 by the Ministry of Information Technology. In 2014, the Directorate was merged with Pakistan Computer Bureau to form National Information Technology Board.

Some of the projects completed by the directorate include:

- Online Processing of Hajj Applications and Status online Tracking for arrangements for the Hujjaj (pilgrims)
- Automation of Prime Minister Secretariat, Islamabad
- Online NADRA Card Application
- E-Enablement of the Senate & National Assembly of Pakistan
- E-service for submission of documents at Securities and Exchange Commission of Pakistan
- Automation of Estate Office
- Development of Urdu Lexicon, Machine Translation & Text to Speech Software for Urdu language
- Online Access to Statutory Case Laws at District Bar Associations
- Automation of Patent Office, Karachi
- E-Enablement of Press Clubs
- Salary Disbursement through ATMs
- IT Skills Training Programme for Probationary Government Officers
- Process mapping for improving efficiency of Ministry of Science & Technology
- Installation of LAN and implementation of Mail Tracking and Internal E-mail System at seven Federal Government Divisions
- IT Technical Support to the Provinces and Azad Jammu and Kashmir
- Development of PPHI Website

== See also ==
- Government of Pakistan
