= Anusha Rahman =

Pakistani politician (born 1968)

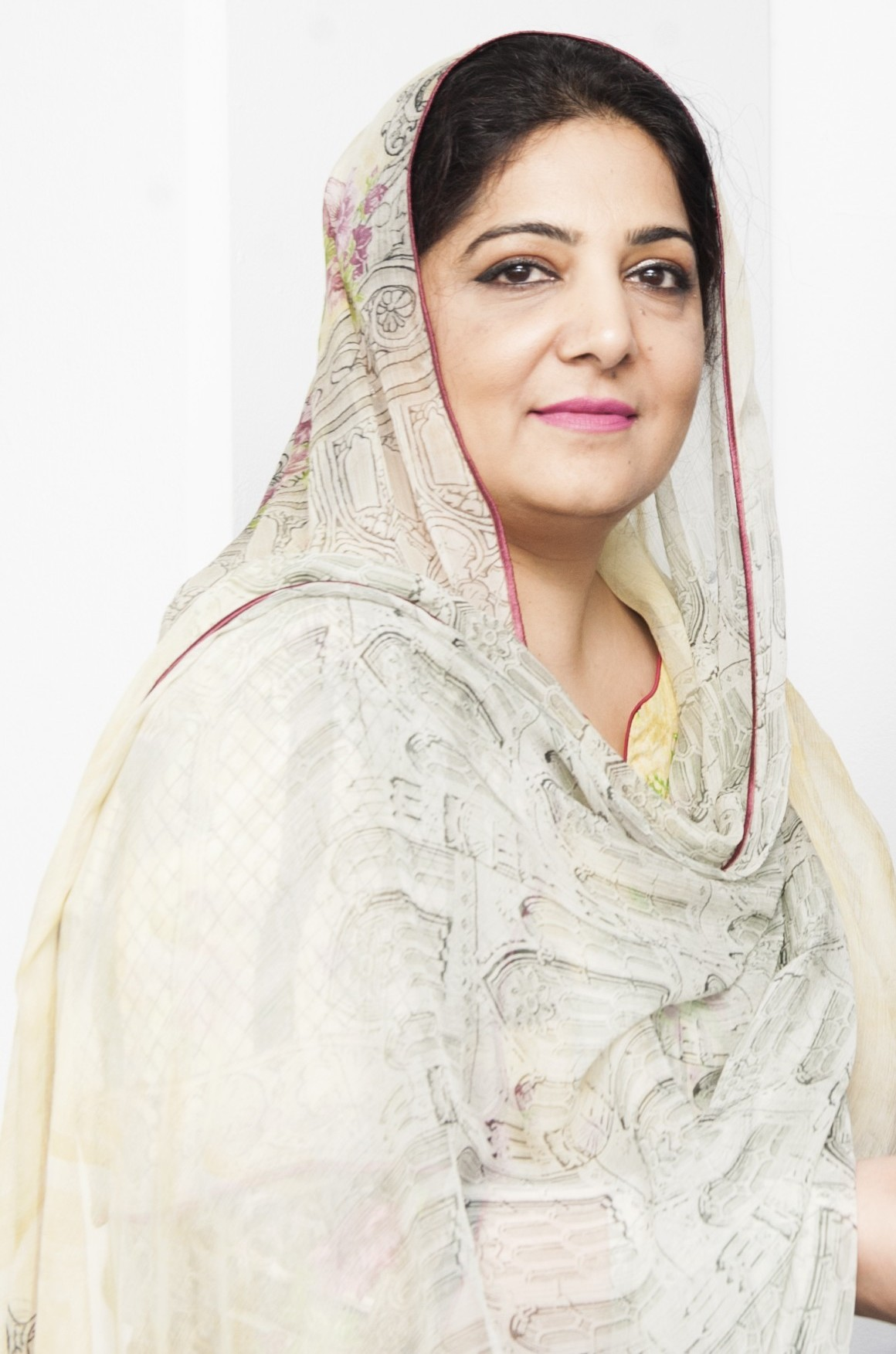

Federal Minister for Information Technology and Telecommunication
- In office 27 April 2018 – 31 May 2018
- President: Mamnoon Hussain
- Prime Minister: Shahid Khaqan Abbasi

Minister of State for Information Technology and Telecommunication
- In office 4 August 2017 – 27 April 2018
- President: Mamnoon Hussain
- Prime Minister: Shahid Khaqan Abbasi
- In office 7 June 2013 – 28 July 2017
- President: Mamnoon Hussain
- Prime Minister: Nawaz Sharif

Member of the National Assembly of Pakistan
- In office 17 March 2008 – 31 May 2018
- Constituency: Reserved seat for women

Member of the Senate of Pakistan
- Incumbent
- Assumed office 2024

Personal details
- Born: 1 June 1968 (age 58) Lahore, Punjab, Pakistan
- Party: PMLN (2008-present)
- Education: University College London

Anusha Rahman (Urdu: انوشہ رحمان, born June 1, 1968) is a Pakistani lawyer and politician who is affiliated with the Pakistan Muslim League (N).

== Early life and education ==
Rahman was born on June 1, 1968 in Lahore, Pakistan. In 1992, she graduated with a Master of Laws from University College London, specializing in the law and economics of regulated industries and markets.

== Political career ==
Rahman began her political career in 2006, when she became senior vice president of the lawyers’ wing of the PML-N (Pakistani Muslim League). She took part in the Lawyers’ Movement, calling for the restoration of the judiciary following the Pakistani state of emergency in 2007.

She was elected to the National Assembly of Pakistan in the 2008 Pakistani general election on a reserved seat for women. She served on the National Assembly Standing Committee on Law and Justice and in 2009 was a member of the PML‑N steering committee for legal matters. Rahman was re‑elected to the National Assembly of Pakistan in the 2013 Pakistani general election on a reserved seat for women. In 2013, she was appointed Minister of State for Information Technology and Telecommunication.

In July 2017, she left office when the federal cabinet was disbanded following the resignation of Prime Minister Nawaz Sharif after the Panama Papers case decision. After Shahid Khaqan Abbasi became prime minister in August 2017, she was inducted into the Abbasi ministry and was reappointed Minister of State for Information Technology and Telecommunication.

In April 2018, Rahman was appointed Federal Minister for Information Technology and Telecommunication in the cabinet of Prime Minister Shahid Khaqan Abbasi. Following the dissolution of the National Assembly at the end of its term on 31 May 2018, she left office.

In the 2024 Pakistani Senate elections, Rahman, supported by the Pakistan Muslim League (N), won a reserved women’s seat with 125 votes.

== Key contributions and achievements ==
As Minister of State and later Federal Minister for Information Technology and Telecommunication, Rahman was involved in the development of the Telecom Sector Policy 2015, which introduced regulatory changes in Pakistan’s telecommunications sector. The policy received the Government Leadership Award in 2017 from the GSMA for its role in Pakistan’s telecommunication sector. Rahman was also involved with the government’s e-Governance program, which sought to digitize government administrative functions. According to official figures, exports of information technology and IT-enabled services increased during this period, although independent assessments of figures have varied.

In 2015, Rahman received the GEM-TECH Global Achievers Award from UN Women and the International Telecommunication Union, for work related to gender equality in the technology sector.

=== Mobile Broadband ===
In 2014, during Rahman's tenure as Minister for IT and Telecommunication, Pakistan auctioned the licenses for 3G and 4G services in the 850 MHz, 1800 MHz, and 2100 MHz bands. Following the auction, mobile broadband penetration in Pakistan increased from less than 3% in 2013 to over 40% by 2018, according to Pakistan Telecommunication Authority data. Following these developments, Pakistan received the Spectrum for Mobile Broadband Award at the GSMA Mobile World Congress in 2015.

=== ICTs for Girls Program ===
In December 2015, Rahman announced the “ICTs for Girls” initiative, aimed at improving digital literacy among women and girls from disadvantaged backgrounds. The program included access to ICT facilities and training on basic digital skills. According to the Ministry of Information Technology and Telecommunication, the initiative was developed in partnership with Microsoft to provide training modules in computing and coding to women and girls. According to the Universal Service Fund, 144 women empowerment centres and 226 schools in Islamabad were later provided with ICT labs under the initiative.

=== National Incubation Center and DigiSkills ===
Rahman helped launch Pakistan's first National Incubation Center (NIC) in 2016 as a public–private partnership between the Ministry of Information Technology, Ignite (National ICT R&D Fund), and service delivery partner Team Up. The NIC provided workspace, training, and mentorship to technology start-ups and was later expanded to additional cities.

In February 2018, Rahman launched the DigiSkills program, an online training initiative focused on freelancing and digital work. The program's stated goal was to train one million individuals. A DigiSkills 2.0 program was also created. DigiSkills 3.0 was launched in July 2025 with the stated aim of training three million people by the end of 2028.

On 15 February 2019, the Commonwealth Telecommunications Organisation (CTO) appointed Rahman as regional advisor to the secretary‑general for the East and South Asia region.
