= RCET =

RCET may refer to:

- Rachna College of Engineering & Technology, in Wazirabad, Punjab, Pakistan
- Royal College of Engineering & Technology, in Thrissur, Kerala, India
- Rungta College of Engineering and Technology, a campus of Rungta College Bhilai, in Chhattisgarh, India
