= University of Engineering and Technology Faisalabad Campus =

University of Engineering and Technology, Lahore Faisalabad campus
- Type: Public, constituent
- Established: 2004
- Affiliations: University of Engineering and Technology, Lahore, Pakistan Engineering Council
- Location: Faisalabad, Punjab, Pakistan
- Nickname: UET Faisalabad campus
- Website: uet.edu.pk/campus?RID=info&campus_id=3

The University of Engineering and Technology, Faisalabad campus (UET Faisalabad campus) is a sub-campus of University of Engineering and Technology, Lahore located in Faisalabad, Punjab, Pakistan.

== History and overview ==
In 2004, Government of Pakistan directed Government of the Punjab to set up a campus of University of Engineering and Technology, Lahore in Faisalabad with a future plan to upgrade it into a full-fledged university. In the same year, it was inaugurated by the then President of Pakistan Pervez Musharraf. Initially, the campus was started in the old Hamdard University Faisalabad campus until its own campus was built at the current location near Khurrianwala, Faisalabad. The campus covers 208 acres of land space.

== Departments ==
The campus has five departments, offering both undergraduate and postgraduate degrees.

- Department of Mechanical, Mechatronics and Manufacturing Engineering
- Department of Textile Engineering
- Department of Electrical, Electronics and Telecommunication Engineering
- Department of Chemical and Polymer Engineering
- Department of Computer Science
- Department of Basic Sciences and Humanities

== Student societies ==
- InnoTex - Society of UET Textile Engineers
- Society of Electrical and Electronics Engineers (SEEE)
- Mechatronics And Control Society (MACS)
- Society of Chemical Engineers
- UET FSD Media and News Club
- Blood Donating Society
- Aquila Society

== See also ==
- University of Engineering and Technology, New Campus
- Rachna College of Engineering and Technology, Gujranwala
