= Kala Shah Kaku =

Coordinates: 31°45′N 74°14′E

- Town
- Interactive map of Kala Shah Kaku
- Country: Pakistan
- Province: Punjab
- District: Sheikhupura

Kala Shah Kaku (also known as KSK) is a town located in Sheikhupura District, Punjab, Pakistan. It is part of the Ferozewala Tehsil of Sheikhupura District. Kala Shah Kaku is on the M-2 motorway and Grand Trunk Road (GT Road) 19 km west from Lahore. It is the main entry point of Lahore from Peshawar, Rawalpindi, Sialkot, Kharian, Gujrat, Jhelum, Wazirabad and Gujranwala via GT Road. It was earlier famous due to Pakistan State Oil (PSO) depot being located here. This depot was the main source of fuel supply to Lahore, Gujranwala, Sheikhupura and Kasur, etc.

Kala Shah Kaku is an industrial area. Many industries are located here. Famous engineering institution of Pakistan, University of Engineering and Technology, Lahore (UET Lahore) has a campus in this area called UET, New Campus which was established in 2006. Moreover, the first ground station of Paksat-1R satellite has been established in Kala Shah Kaku which is managed by SUPARCO, the national space agency of Pakistan.
