= DigiSkills.pk =

Online training program in Pakistan

- DigiSkills.pk
- Legal status: Government Owned
- Purpose: To Literate Population with Digital Skills
- Headquarters: M.A. Jinnah Campus, Defence Road, Off Raiwind Road, Lahore, Pakistan.
- Website: www.digiskills.pk

DigiSkills.pk is an online training program in Pakistan. This is an initiative of the Government of Pakistan spearheaded by Ministry of Information Technology and Telecommunication through Ignite - National Technology Fund (formerly National ICT R&D Fund) and executed by Virtual University of Pakistan.

DigiSkills provides online education in Virtual Assistant, Freelancing, E-Commerce Management, Digital Marketing, Digital Literacy, QuickBooks, AutoCAD, WordPress, Graphic Design, Creative Writing and SEO (Search Engine Optimization).

== History ==
Digital Skills (DigiSkills.pk) Training Program was inaugurated by Prime Minister Shahid Khaqan Abbassi on February 1, 2018. Purpose of this initiative is to offer one million trainings in the future of work using technology. Virtual University of Pakistan has been selected to execute training program under the auspices of Ministry of Information Technology and Telecommunication through Ignite- National Technology Fund (formerly National ICT R&D Fund).

== See also ==
- National Freelance Training Program
