= National Information Technology Board =

Pakistan government agency

National Information Technology Board (NITB)
Agency overview
- Formed: 2014; 12 years ago
- Jurisdiction: Pakistan
- Headquarters: Islamabad
- Parent agency: Ministry of Information Technology and Telecommunication
- Website: nitb.gov.pk

The National Information Technology Board (NITB) is an autonomous government agency under the Ministry of Information Technology and Telecommunication in Pakistan. It was founded in 2014.

== History ==
National Information Technology Board (NITB) was established in 2014 after the merger of the Pakistan Computer Bureau (PCB) and the Electronic Government Directorate (EGD). However, under the National Information Technology Board Act, of 2022, its status changed to an autonomous body. The Act was approved by the President of Pakistan under Article 75 of the Constitution of Pakistan.

== Role and functions ==
The NITB is responsible for implementing e-governance across the country as per the vision and policy of the Federal Government. Its objective is to serve the public in a more efficient and effective manner through the provision of e-governance software applications to advisories, consultancies, and federal ministries and divisions. NITB has developed and launched more than 31 portals and more than 15 mobile applications in the last four years.

=== Beep Pakistan ===
The NITB launched Pakistan's first communication application "Beep Pakistan" under the leadership of Federal Minister for IT and Telecommunication Syed Aminul Haque. This application is intended to be a homegrown alternative to WhatsApp and aims for secure and efficient digital communication between government officials and employees.

== Misgivings over tendering process ==
In July 2023, a media report cited sources–which the report neither named nor even generally specified–to allege that the NITB's tendering process was designed to favor one of the potential bidders.
