= University of Engineering and Technology, Lahore =

University in Punjab, Pakistan

Coordinates: 31.57993°N 74.3561°E

- جامعۂ ہندسہ و تکنیک، لاہور
- Other name: UET
- Former names: Mughalpura Technical College, Maclagan Engineering College, Punjab College of Engineering and Technology, East Punjab College of Engineering
- Motto: Read in the name of thy Lord who created!
- Type: Public
- Established: 1921
- Academic affiliations: Higher Education Commission (Pakistan); Pakistan Engineering Council; National Computing Education Accreditation Council; Pakistan Council for Architects and Town Planners; Washington Accord
- Budget: 350 Million
- Chancellor: Governor of the Punjab
- Vice-Chancellor: Shahid Munir (TI)
- Registrar: Muhammad Asif
- Students: 25000
- Undergraduates: 18000
- Postgraduates: 7000
- Doctoral students: 300
- Location: Lahore, Punjab, Pakistan
- Campus: 300 acres
- Mascot: UETIANS
- Website: uet.edu.pk

The University of Engineering and Technology, Lahore (UET Lahore) is a public university located in Lahore, Punjab, Pakistan specializing in science, technology, engineering, and mathematics (STEM) subjects. It is the oldest and one of the most selective engineering institutions in Pakistan. Every year around 40,000 candidates appear in ECAT while there are around 3,045 fully subsidized (A1 & A1-M) and partially subsidized (A2 and A2-M) seats available in UET Lahore and its campuses, making a selection ratio of 7.6% in ECAT based disciplines.

== History and overview ==
Founded on 1 January 1921 in Mughalpura, a suburban area of Lahore, as Mughalpura Technical College, it later became the MacLagan Engineering College, a name given to it in 1923 after Sir Edward Douglas MacLagan, the then Governor of Punjab, who laid the foundation stone of the main building, now called the Main Block. In 1929, it was affiliated with the University of Punjab for the award of bachelor's degrees in electrical and mechanical engineering. In 1939, the name was again changed to Punjab College of Engineering and Technology, and a Civil Engineering degree was also started in the college. At the time of partition, part of the college relocated to India, called East Punjab College of Engineering. In 1954, a bachelor's degree program in mining engineering was started. In 1962, it was granted a charter and was named the West Pakistan University of Engineering and Technology, Lahore. During the 1960s, bachelor's degree programs were started in chemical engineering, petroleum and gas engineering, metallurgical engineering, architecture and city and regional planning. In 1972, it was officially renamed the University of Engineering and Technology, Lahore. By the 1970s, it had established a score of master's degree programs in engineering, architecture, city and regional planning and allied disciplines. Several Ph.D. degree programs were also started.

A second campus of the university was established in 1975 in Sahiwal, which was relocated to Taxila in 1978 and became an independent university in 1993 called the University of Engineering and Technology, Taxila.

Today, it is widely considered one of the best and most prestigious engineering universities in Pakistan. More than 50,000 students apply for admission every year.

The university, as of 2016, had a faculty of 881, 257 of whom had doctorates. It had a total of 9,385 undergraduate and 1,708 postgraduate students.

It has a strong collaboration with the University of South Carolina, University of Manchester and Queen Mary University of London, and has conducted research funded by Huawei, Cavium Networks, Microsoft and MontaVista.

It is one of the highest ranked universities in Pakistan. Domestic rankings place it as the third-best engineering school in Pakistan, while QS World University Ranking put it as 236th in the world in the category of Engineering & Technology in 2024. It was ranked 101-150 in the category of Petroleum Engineering, 201-250 in Electrical & Electronics Engineering, 251-300 in Mechanical Engineering, 351-400 in Chemical Engineering, and 401-450 in Computer Science & Information Systems in the world by the same publication in 2024. Meanwhile, in Asia the university ranking is currently ranked at No. 165.

As of 2025, Computer Science is the highest-merit and most sought-after discipline at UET Lahore (at the undergraduate level).

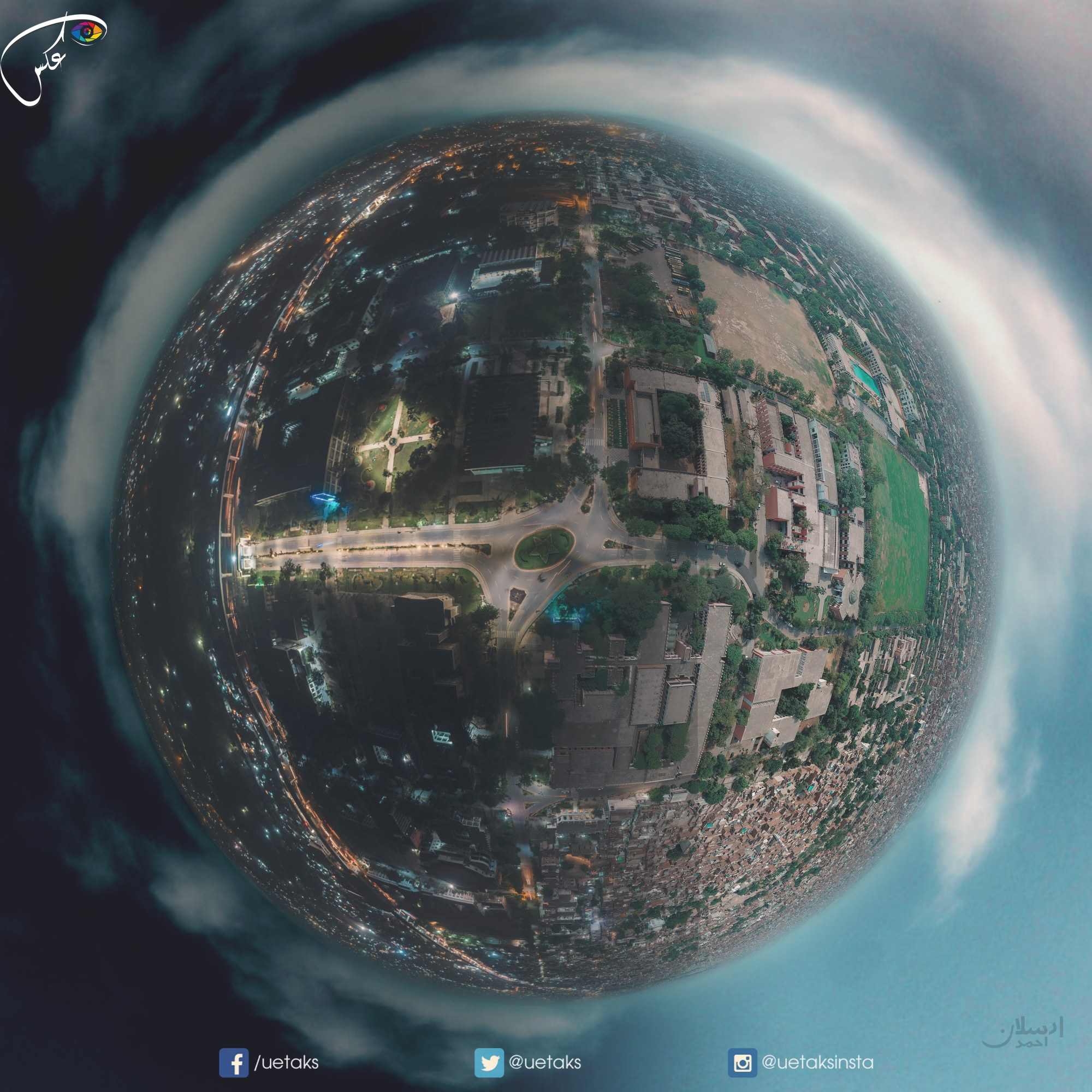
Aerial panorama of UET Lahore and its surroundings

The government of Punjab commemorated the 100th anniversary of UET by issuing a commemorative coin and a postage stamp in January 2022.

== Location ==
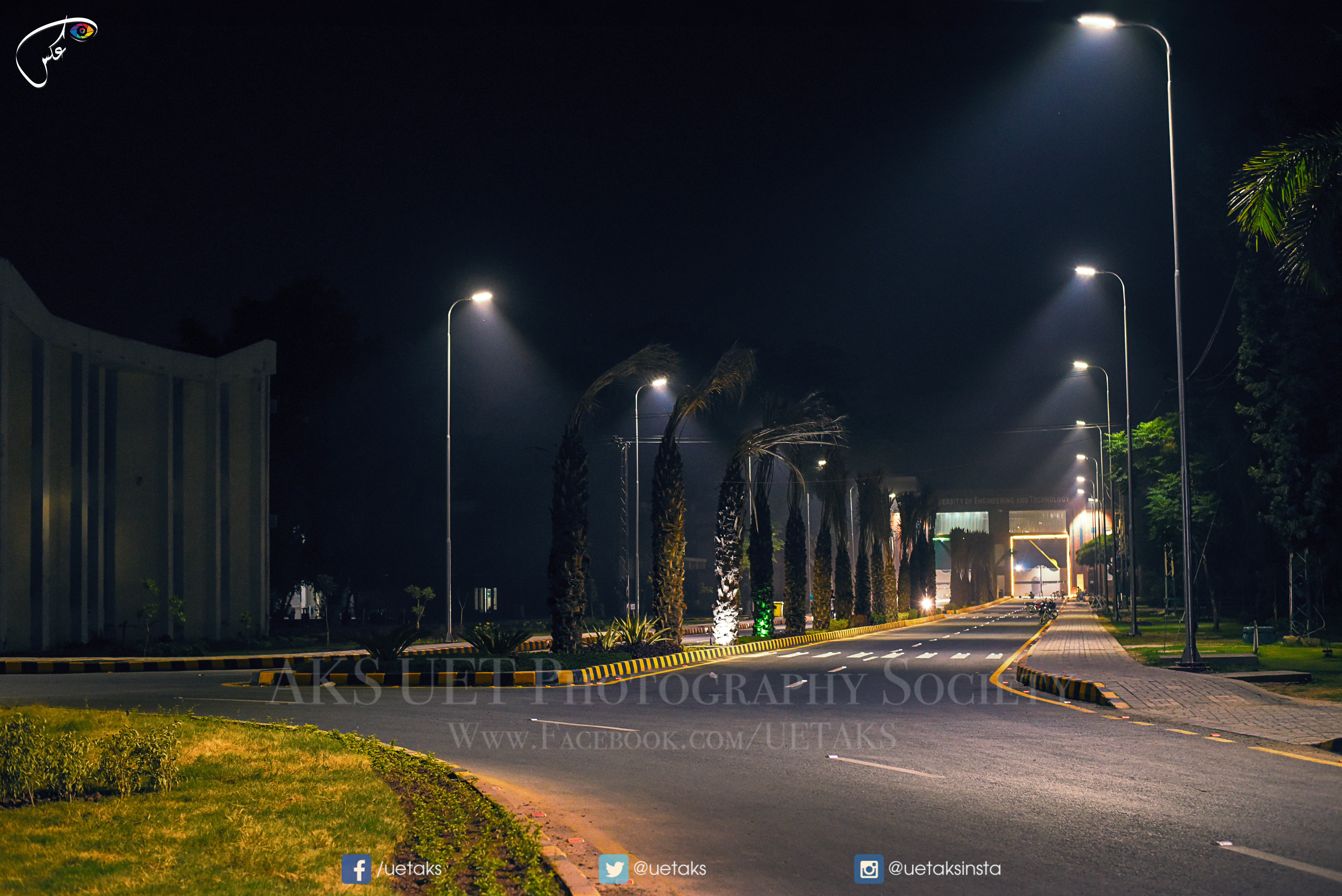
Khayaban e Fazal, the newly constructed entrance of UET Lahore

The campus is situated on the Grand Trunk Road (GT Road), a few kilometers from the Mughal era Shalimar Gardens.

== Sub-campuses and constituent colleges ==
Sub-campus/constituent college	Location	Establishment
Rachna College of Engineering and Technology	Wazirabad	2003
UET Faisalabad Campus	Faisalabad	2004
UET New Campus	Kala Shah Kaku (Sheikhupura District)	2006
UET Narowal Campus	Narowal	2012

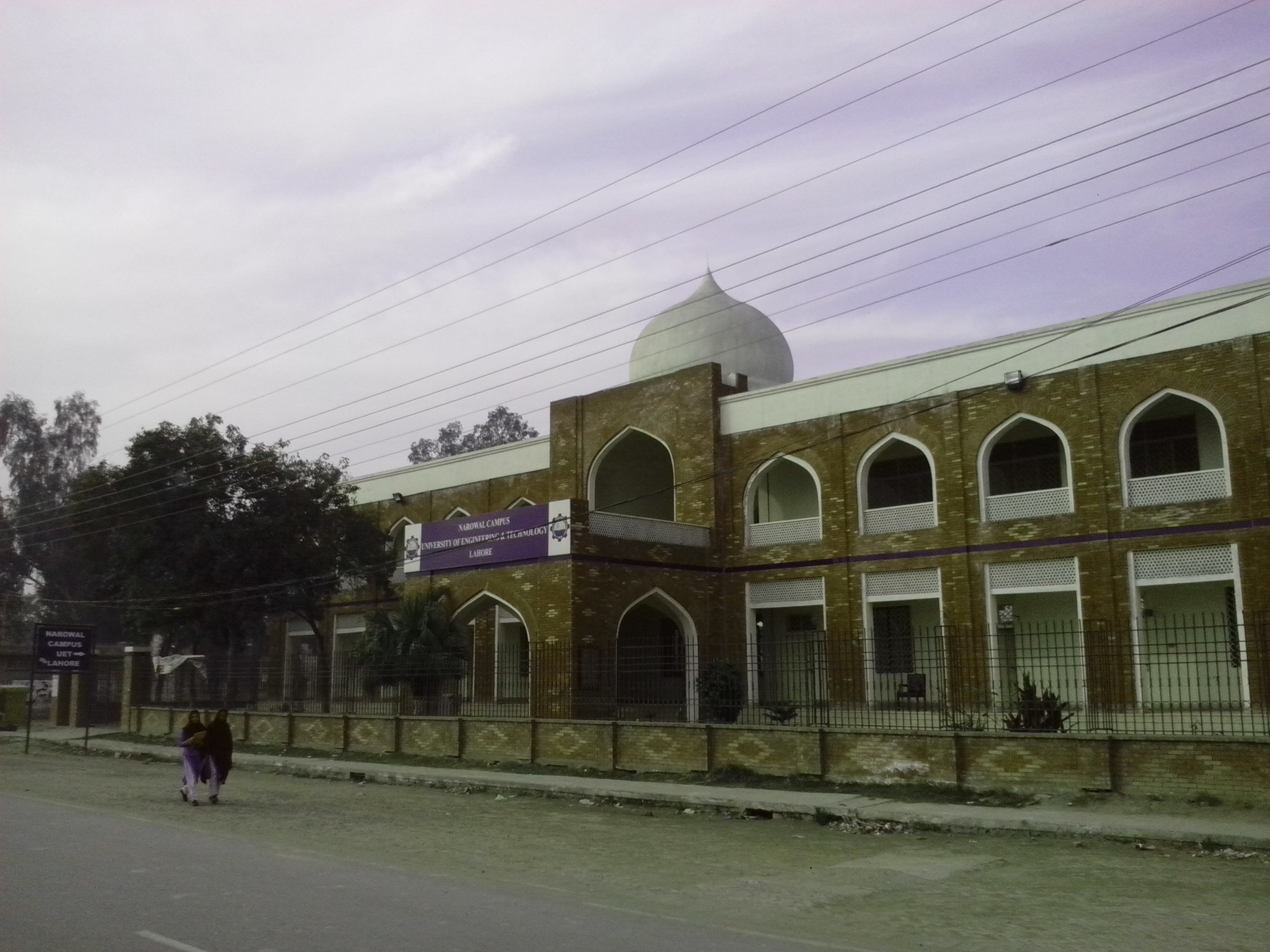
UET Narowal Campus (temporary building)

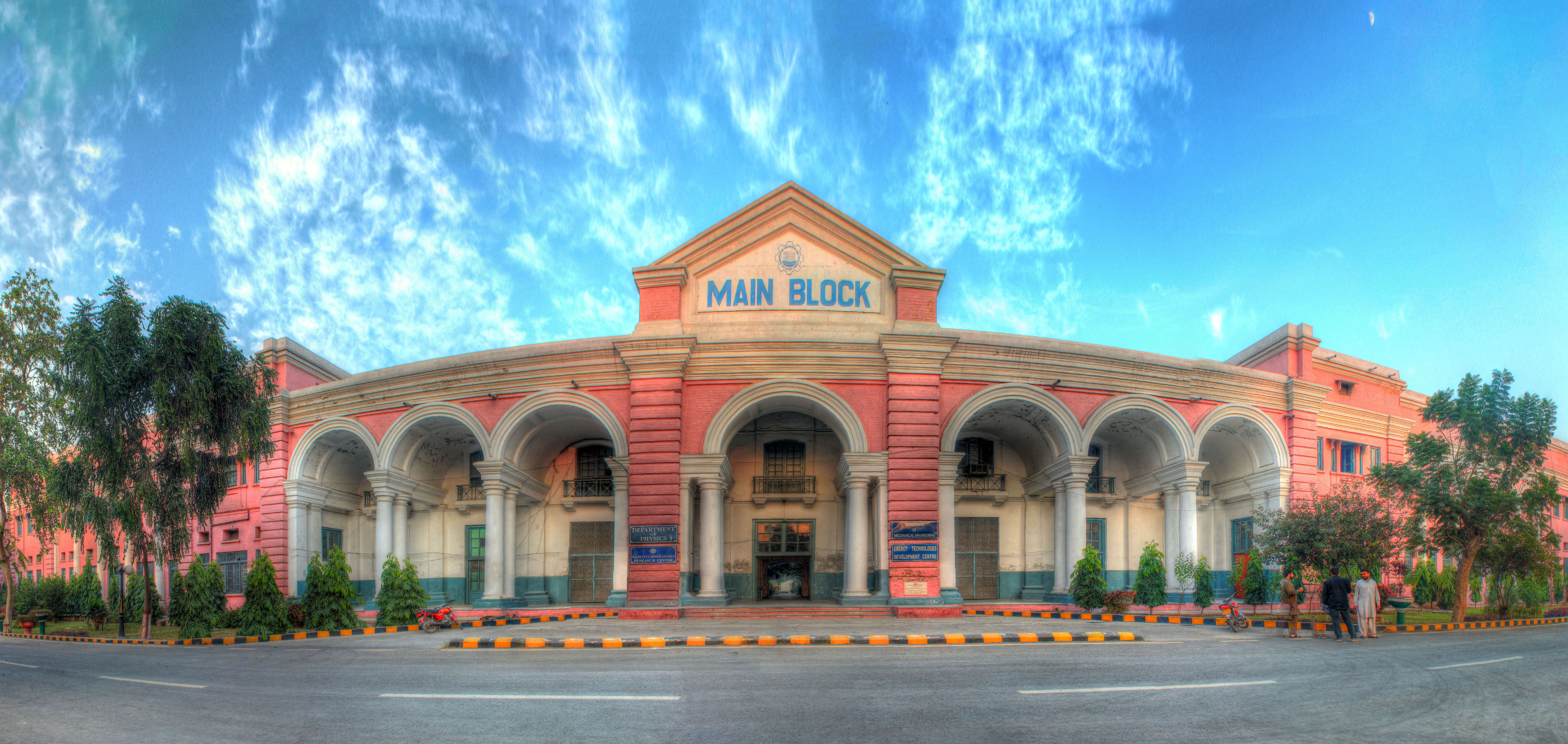
UET Lahore City Campus, Main Block

== Research centers ==
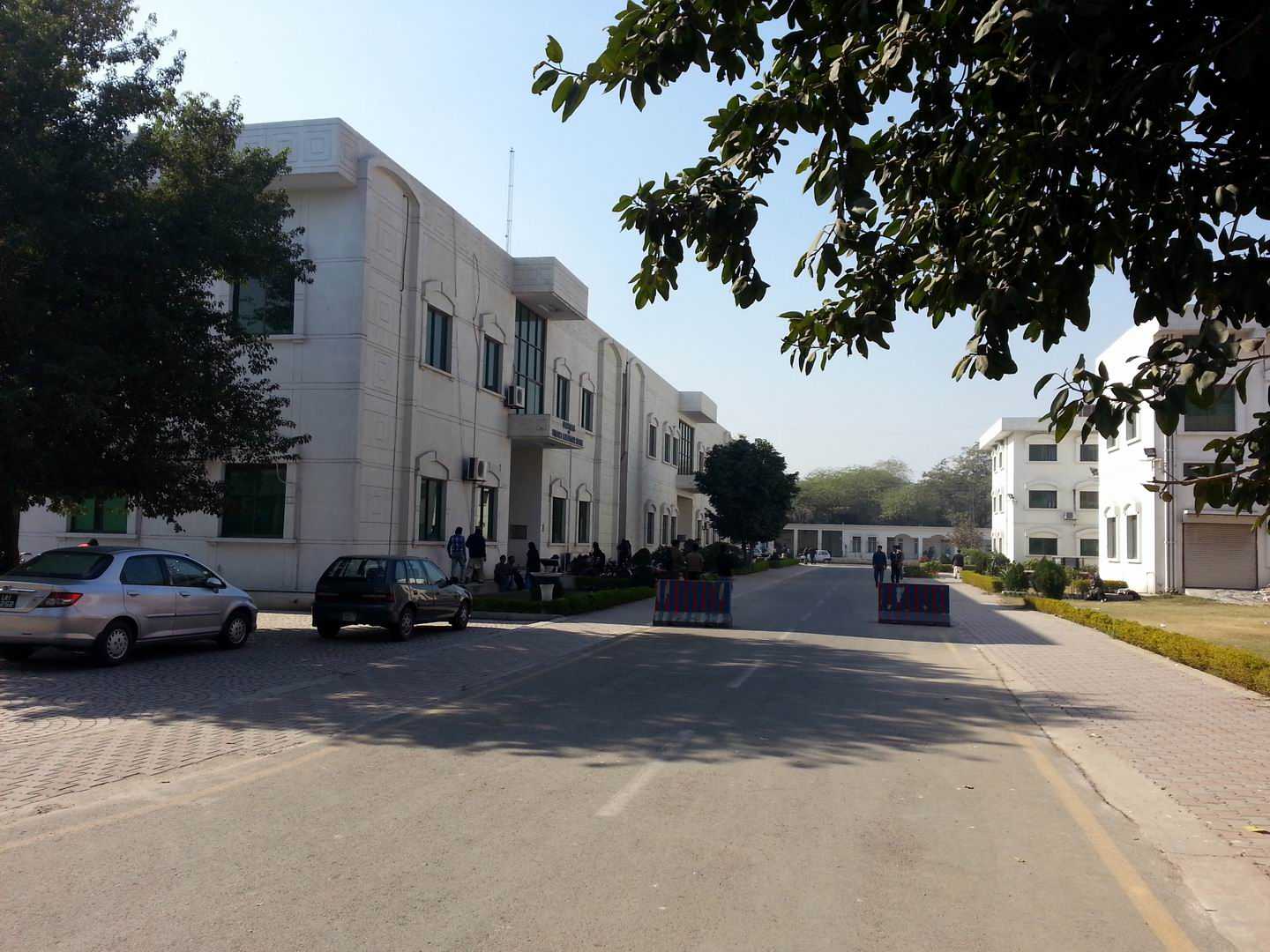
Laser and Optronics Center

The university consists of the following research centers:

- Al-Khawarizmi Institute of Computer Science (KICS)
- Huawei – UET Joint TeleComm and IT Center
- Center for Language Engineering
- ZTE – UET Joint TeleComm Center
- Laser and Optronics Center
- Energy Research Technologies Development Center
- Institute of Environmental Engineering and Research
- DSP and Wireless Communication Center
- Center of Excellence in Water Resources Engineering
- Research Center
- Software Engineering Center
- Manufacturing Technologies Development Center
- Automotive Engineering Center
- Nano Technology Research Center
- Innovation and Technology Development Center
- Engineering Services UET Pakistan (Pvt) Limited (ESUPAK)
- Center for Energy Research and Development
- BioMedical Engineering Center

More than 870 students are foreign students and more than 1000 are female students.

== Academics ==
University rankings

Global – Overall
- QS World: 801-850 (2026)

Regional – Overall
- QS Asia: 192 (2026)

=== Degree programmes ===
The disciplines and the degree programmes offered by UET, Lahore have been given below. The regular duration of B.Sc. and M.Sc. degree programmes is 4 and 2 years, respectively.

Discipline	Degree Programme		
Discipline	B.Sc. / BS	M.Sc. / M.Phil	Ph.D.
Applied Computing	✓		
Architectural Engineering	✓		✓
Architecture	✓	✓	✓
Artificial Intelligence	✓	✓	
Automotive Engineering	✓	✓	✓
Business Data Analytics	✓		
Chemical Engineering	✓	✓	✓
City and Regional Planning	✓	✓	✓
Civil Engineering	✓		✓
Computer Engineering	✓	✓	✓
Computer Science	✓	✓	✓
Cybersecurity	✓		
Data Science	✓	✓	
Electrical Engineering	✓	✓	✓
Environmental Engineering	✓	✓	✓
Gaming and Animations	✓		
Geological Engineering	✓	✓	✓
Industrial & Manufacturing Engineering	✓		
Information Systems Technology	✓		
Logistics & Supply Chain Management	✓		
Mechanical Engineering	✓	✓	✓
Mechatronics & Control Engineering	✓	✓	✓
Metallurgical & Materials Engineering	✓	✓	✓
Mining Engineering	✓	✓	✓
Petroleum & Gas Engineering	✓	✓	✓
Polymer Engineering	✓	✓	✓
Product & Industrial Design	✓	✓	
Robotics & Intelligent Systems	✓		
Software Engineering	✓	✓	
Transportation Engineering	✓	✓	✓
Mathematics	✓	✓	✓
Physics	✓	✓	✓
Chemistry	✓	✓	✓
Business Administration	✓	✓	✓
Business Information Technology	✓		
Business Analytics	✓		
English Language & Literature	✓		
Environmental Science	✓	✓	
Interior Design	✓		
Islamic Studies	✓	✓	✓
Material Sciences	✓		

=== Teaching faculty ===
The faculty consists of 761 people, including 14 international faculty members; around 395 have doctoral degrees. Additionally, 89 faculty members are pursuing Ph.D. programmes right now. Its faculty holds one Tamgha-e-Imtiaz, one Sitara-i-Imtiaz, one Izaz-e-Kamal Presidential Award and nine HEC Best Teacher Awards.

The university has established a Directorate of Research, Extension and Advisory Services which strives for the promotion and organization of research activities. The Al-Khwarizmi Institute of Computer Sciences is a notable name in Pakistan's research activity in computer sciences.

== Co-curricular, extracurricular activities and student societies ==
The university has a sports complex, consisting of a swimming pool, tennis court, table tennis court, squash court, and a cricket stadium used for athletics. The university has several football grounds. Apart from sports-related facilities, there are societies to promote co-curricular activities and seminars.

== The National Library of Engineering Science ==
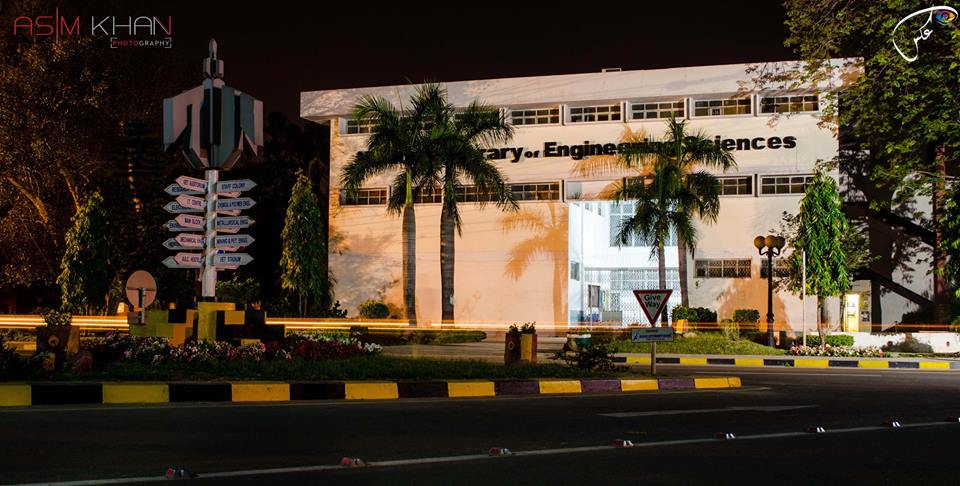
National Library of Engineering Sciences

The National Library of Engineering Science, inaugurated by Faisal bin Abdul-Aziz Al Saud, is the central library of the university. It is a three-story building in front of Allah Hu Chowk. It has a seating capacity of 400 readers. Its collection holds more than 125,000 volumes of books, 22,000 volumes of bound serials, and 600 issues of scientific and technical serials in diverse fields.

The library was recently chosen by the Higher Education Commission to serve as the primary resource center for engineering and technical education.

== Notable alumni ==
- Sultan Bashiruddin Mahmood, is a Pakistani nuclear engineer and a scholar of Islamic studies.
- Ishfaq Ahmad, fellow of IEEE, professor at The University of Texas at Arlington, US
- Arun Kumar Ahuja, late Hindi film actor
- Jawad Ahmad, pop singer
- Parvez Butt, former chairman of Pakistan Atomic Energy Commission (PAEC)
- Mehreen Faruqi, Australian politician
- Mosharraf Hossain, Bangladeshi politician
- Ahsan Iqbal, politician, member of Pakistan Muslim League (N)
- Khawaja Salman Rafique, politician, member of Pakistan Muslim League (N).
- Ishaq Khan Khakwani, politician.
- Junaid Jamshed, religious scholar
- Ahsan Kareem, Robert M. Moran Professor of Engineering and Director of NatHaz Modeling Laboratory at the University of Notre Dame, US
- Fazal Ahmad Khalid, former vice chancellor of the university
- Junaid Khan, rock singer and actor
- Sami Khan, actor
- Faakhir Mehmood, pop singer
- Mir Nooruddin Mengal, slain leader and former acting president of Balochistan National Party (Mengal)
- Adil Najam, dean Pardee School of Global Studies at Boston University, former vice chancellor of Lahore University of Management Sciences, 11th president of WWF and former associate professor at the International Institute for Sustainable Development, former associate professor at Tufts University, US
- Peer Zulfiqar Ahmad Naqshbandi, Islamic scholar
- Fawad Rana, owner of Lahore Qalandars
- Najam Sheraz, pop singer
- Ibtisam Ilahi Zahir, Islamic scholar
- Ikramullah Khan Niazi, Father of Imran Khan (Former Prime Minister of Pakistan)
