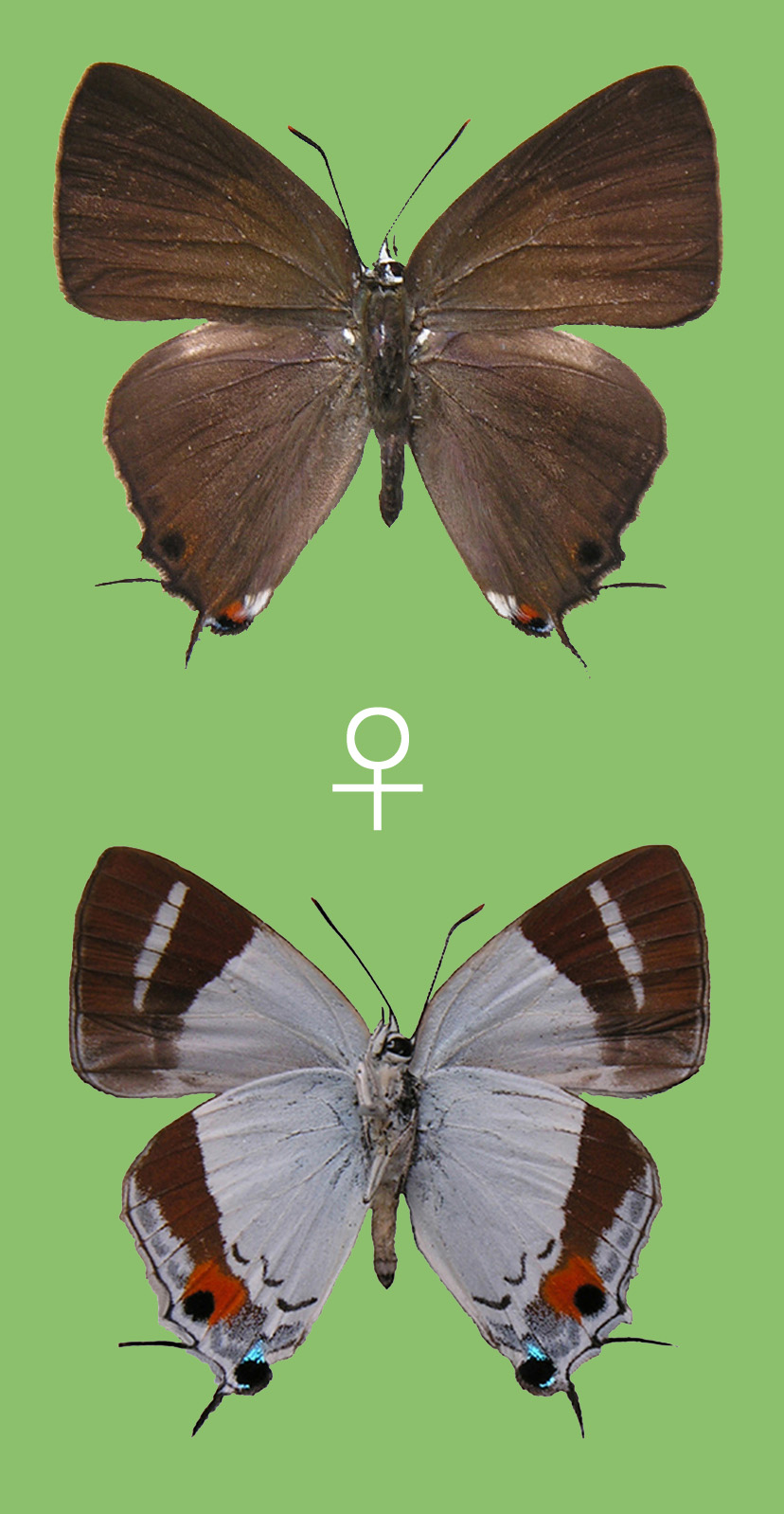
- Female

Scientific classification
- Kingdom: Animalia
- Phylum: Arthropoda
- Class: Insecta
- Order: Lepidoptera
- Family: Lycaenidae
- Genus: Rachana
- Species: R. circumdata

Binomial name
- Rachana circumdata Schroeder, Treadaway & H. Hayashi, 1981

= Rachana circumdata =

Species of butterfly

Rachana circumdata is a butterfly of the family Lycaenidae first described by Heinz G. Schroeder, Colin G. Treadaway and Hisakazu Hayashi in 1978. It is found on Marinduque in the Philippines.

== Subspecies ==
- Rachana circumdata circumdata Schroeder, Treadaway & H. Hayashi, [1981] (Luzon, Camiguin de Luzon, Marinduque and Mindoro Islands)
- Rachana circumdata panayensis Schroeder, Treadaway & H. Hayashi, [1981] (Cebu, Panay and Negros Islands)
