= Musarrat Asif Khawaja =

Pakistani politician

Member of the National Assembly of Pakistan
- Incumbent
- Assumed office 29 February 2024
- Constituency: Reserved seat for women
- In office 13 August 2018 – 10 August 2023
- Constituency: Reserved seat for women

Personal details
- Party: PMLN (2018-present)
- Spouse: Khawaja Muhammad Asif
- Relations: Shaza Fatima Khawaja (niece)

Musarrat Asif Khawaja is a Pakistani politician who has been a member of the National Assembly of Pakistan since February 29, 2024, and having this post previously from August 2018, to till August 10, 2023.

== Early life and marriage ==
She was born in Faisalabad on 9 May 1959 in Chuadhary Sher Ali House.

On the requested of Nawaz Sharif, Chaudhary Sher Ali gave his daughter to Khawaja Muhammad Asif for marriage.

In 1988, Mussarat and Khawaja was married.

== Political career ==
She was elected to the National Assembly of Pakistan as a candidate of Pakistan Muslim League (N) (PML-N) on a reserved seat for women from Punjab in the 2018 Pakistani general election.

She was re-elected to the National Assembly of Pakistan as a candidate of Pakistan Muslim League Nawaz (PML(N)) on a reserved seat for women from Punjab in the 2024 Pakistani General Election.
