= Shaza Fatima Khawaja =

Pakistani politician

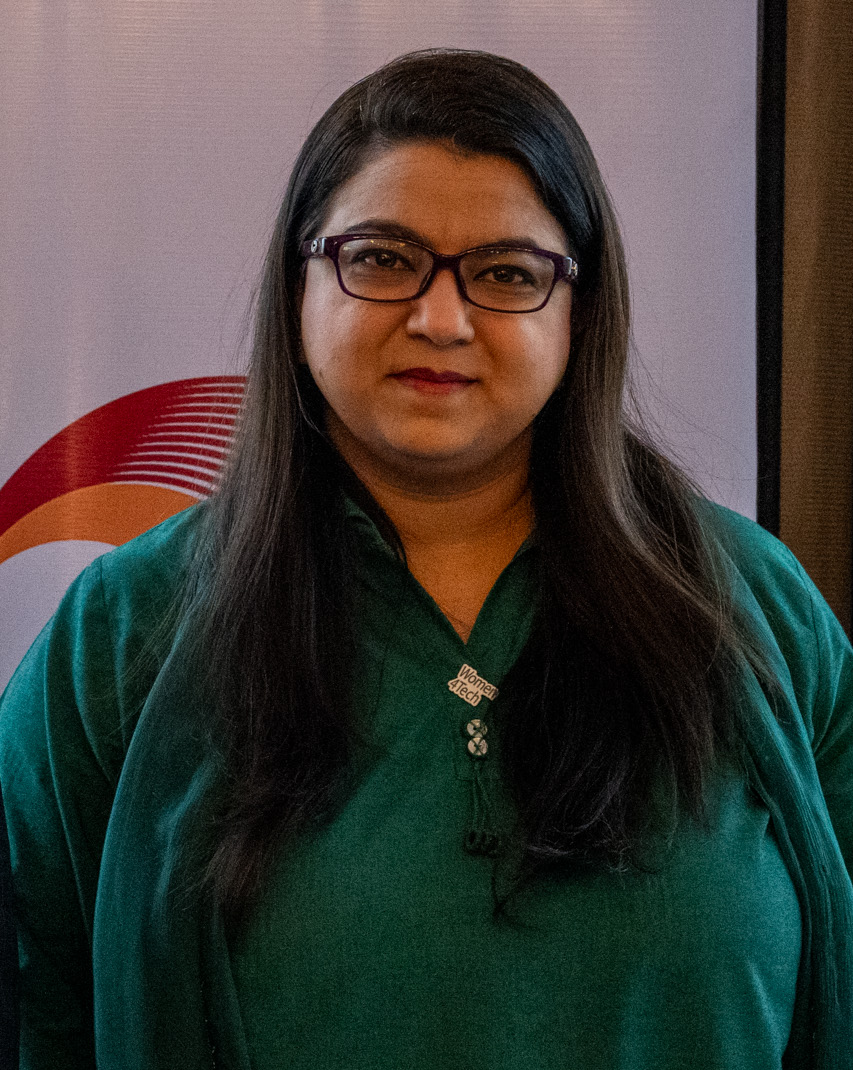
- Shaza in 2025

Federal Minister for Information Technology and Telecommunication
- Incumbent
- Assumed office 27 February 2025
- Prime Minister: Shehbaz Sharif

Minister of State for Information Technology and Telecommunication
- In office 12 March 2024 – 27 February 2025
- Prime Minister: Shehbaz Sharif

Special Assistant to the Prime Minister on Youth Affairs
- In office 14 May 2022 – 10 August 2023
- Prime Minister: Shehbaz Sharif

Member of the National Assembly of Pakistan
- Incumbent
- Assumed office 29 February 2024
- Constituency: Reserved seat for women
- In office 13 August 2018 – 10 August 2023
- Constituency: Reserved seat for women
- In office 3 June 2013 – 31 May 2018
- Constituency: Reserved seat for women

Personal details
- Party: Pakistan Muslim League (N)
- Relatives: Khawaja Muhammad Asif (uncle); Musarrat Asif Khawaja (aunt) Khawaja Muhammad Safdar (Grandfather)
- Education: Lahore Grammar School; Lahore University of Management Sciences; University of Warwick

Shaza Fatima Khawaja (Urdu: شزہ فاطمہ خواجہ) is a Pakistani politician who is the current Federal Minister for Information Technology and Telecommunication, in office since 12 March 2024. She has been a Member of the National Assembly of Pakistan since June 2013 and previously served as Special Assistant to Prime Minister on Youth Affairs with the status of Minister of State.

== Early life and education ==
Shaza completed her education at Lahore Grammar School and Lahore University of Management Sciences before earning a Master’s degree in Political Science from the University of Warwick in the United Kingdom.

== Political career ==
She was elected to the National Assembly of Pakistan as a candidate of Pakistan Muslim League (N) (PML-N) on a reserved seat for women from Punjab in the 2013 Pakistani general election.

In October 2017, she held the position of parliamentary secretary for the Ministry of Trade, Commerce, and Textile as well as served as the Vice President of the Young Parliamentarians Forum of the National Assembly.

She taught Political Science to undergraduate students at LUMS and served as a faculty member at LUMS from 2012 to 2018.

She was re-elected to the National Assembly as a candidate of the PML-N on a reserved seat for women in the 2018 Pakistani general election. On 14 May 2022, she officially took on the role of Special Assistant to the Prime Minister on Youth Affairs in the federal cabinet of Prime Minister Shehbaz Sharif, with the rank of Minister of State.

She was re-elected to the National Assembly as a candidate of the PML-N on a reserved seat for women in the 2024 Pakistani general election. On 11 March, she was inducted into the federal cabinet of Prime Minister Shehbaz Sharif with the status of Minister of State. She was the sole female member of the 19-member cabinet. On 12 March, she was assigned the ministerial portfolio of Minister of State for Information Technology and Telecommunication.

In August 2024, during a press briefing, she, as Minister of State for Information Technology and Telecommunication, attributed internet slowdowns in Pakistan to a surge in VPN usage, and claimed it was stressing the country’s internet infrastructure. This explanation was met with criticism from digital rights advocates, businesses and IT experts, who found it unconvincing.

Her role was elevated to Federal Minister for Information Technology and Telecommunication in March 2025.
