= Racanā =

Brahmanical exegesis and philosophy term

Rachanā (Sanskrit: रचना) is derived from the root verb – रच् - meaning – to arrange. Rachanā (रचनम् - ना = रचना) means – arrangement, preparation, disposition, formation, creation, production, performance, completion, array of troops, literary work, a creation of the mind, contrivance, invention e.g. chitra-rachana (drawing/painting), kāvya-rachana (poetic composition), anvaya-rachana (indeclinable/undistributable middle sentence construction).

Proponents of Advaita Vedanta use this term to refer to the composition or structure of Brahman; Shankara explains that Brahman cannot be described by any name or form, the mind cannot think about Its composition (rachanā). Even Badarayana in his Brahma Sutras (Sutra II.ii.1) states :-

रचनाऽनुपपत्तेश्च नानुमानम् |

"The inferred one (pradhana) is not (the cause) owing to the impossibility of explaining the design, as also for other reasons."

Badarayana uses the word rachanā to mean - 'design', he explains that on no account can the insentient pradhana create this universe, which cannot even be mentally conceived of by the intelligent (skilful persons, architects).

== Notable people ==
- Rachana Narayanankutty: an actress and television anchor from Kerala, India.
- Rachana Banerjee: an Indian Bengali actress in Calcutta-based Bengali Cinema at Tollywood.
- Rachana Maurya: an Indian dancer and film actress.
- Rachana Kamtekar: an American philosopher

== Other uses ==
Rachana is also the title of a 1983 film and a genus of butterflies in the family Lycaenidae.
