= Central Model School, Lahore =

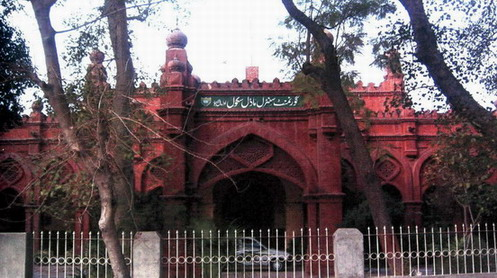
- Lahore, Punjab; Pakistan

Information
- Type: Model school
- Established: 1883; 143 years ago
- Enrollment: c. 3,000

Government Central Model School, Lahore is a public school in Lahore, Punjab, Pakistan. More than 3,000 students study in the school.

== History ==
Central Model School was established in 1883 as middle school in the building of Anarkali Girls High School, opposite the Punjab University senate hall. The middle school was upgraded to high level in 1888 and shifted to a portion of Central Training College. The space in the training college being insufficient, the school was shifted to the present building in 1891 near District Courts Lahore.

Junior classes were abolished in 1920 by H.T. Nolton, the headmaster, but were restored in 1940 by the first Muslim headmaster of the school, M.A. Makhdumi. The Makhdumi Hall at the school is named after him.

Central Model School served as a laboratory school for the Central Training College from 1891 to 1991.

The school was granted autonomous status in 1990, with its own board of governors.

== Former headmasters ==
- H. T. Knowlton took charge as the first headmaster.
- W. T. Wright (1897 - 1903)
- H. Y. Langhorne (1904 - 1908)
- H. Hargreaves (1909 - 1910)
- F. R. Tomlinson (1910 - 1915)
- E. Tyderman (1915 - 1918)
- E. Smith (1918 - 1929)
- Mohan Lal Bhalla (1929 - 1940)
- M. A. Makhdumi (1940 - 1947)

After Partition (Post-1947):

- M. A. Bari (1947 - 1950)
- M. I. Shamim (1951 - 1953)
- Captain N. S. Khan (1953 - 1954)
- Abdul Wahid (September 1954 – October 1956)
- Mahmood Ali (October 1956 – January 1960)
- G. N. Butt (January 1960 – December 1970)
- M. Gulzar Bhatti (1970 - 1972)
- Ch. Nazir Ahmad (1972 - 1978)
- Farooq Ahmad Siddiqi (1978 - 1978)
- M. Gulzar Bhatti (1978 - 1981)
- Abdur Rashid (November 1981 – September 1982)
- Captain Muhammad Ashraf (November 1982 – January 1995)
- Ch. Aman Ullah Khan (1995 - 1995)
- Muhammad Ashraf Naz Gonda (1995 - Late 1990s)
- Ch. Akram (Ali 1999 - 2003)
- Muhammad Ashraf Naz Gondal (2003 - 2004)

==Former headmasters==

The journey of leadership at Government Central Model School, Lahore, began in November 1892, when Mr. H. T. Knowlton took charge as the first headmaster. After four years of service, he passed the torch to Mr. W. T. Wright in January 1897, who led the school through the turn of the century until December 1903. In January 1904, Mr. H. Y. Langhorne stepped in, serving until the end of 1908, followed by Mr. H. Hargreaves, who held the post from January 1909 to July 1910. The school then came under the stewardship of Mr. F. R. Tomlinson from August 1910 to March 1915, a period marked by global turbulence during World War I.

Taking over in April 1915, Mr. E. Tyderman guided the institution until December 1918, after which Mr. E. Smith became headmaster, leading for an impressive eleven years until November 1929. Mr. Mohan Lal Bhalla then assumed the role, overseeing the school during a critical period from December 1929 to December 1940. Finally, Mr. M. A. Makhdumi carried the institution through the last years of British India, serving from December 1940 until June 1947, just before the Partition of India.

'''After Partition (Post-1947):'''

As the new nation of Pakistan emerged, Government Central Model School stepped into a new chapter of its history. Mr. M. A. Bari was the first headmaster of the post-Partition era, leading from June 1947 to June 1950. He was succeeded by Mr. M. I. Shamim in April 1951, who remained in office until May 1953. Captain N. S. Khan then briefly held the office from December 1953 to July 1954.

The following years saw a series of different headmasters : Mr. Abdul Wahid (September 1954 – October 1956), Mr. Mahmood Ali (October 1956 – January 1960), and Mr. G. N. Butt (January 1960 – December 1970), each contributing to the school's growth in the early years of Pakistan.

In December 1970, Mr. M. Gulzar Bhatti assumed charge, serving until June 1972. From June 1972 Ch. Nazir Ahmad served as the headmaster of CMHS until May 1978.

Chaudary Nazir Ahmad was a devoted headmaster who served the institution with unwavering dedication. Under his leadership, the school experienced exponential growth both in its physical infrastructure and its stature. His tenure is widely regarded as the most outstanding period in CMHS history.

Farooq Ahmad Siddiqi then took over was a short period of time, succeeded once again by Mr. M. Gulzar Bhatti from August 1978 to October 1981. Afterward, Abdur Rashid (November 1981 – September 1982) and Captain Muhammad Ashraf (November 1982 – January 1995) led the institution.In 1995, Ch. Aman Ullah Khan briefly served, Muhammad Ashraf Naz Gondal was appointed on May 4, 1995, guiding the school into the late 1990s. After a brief tenure of Ch. Akram Ali from August 1999 to August 2003, Muhammad Ashraf Naz Gondal once again took charge, leading the school from August 6, 2003, until July 25, 2004.

The school has been fortunate to have had great headmasters over the years and continues to thrive under the leadership of the current headmaster

== Current headmasters ==
The current senior headmaster is Syed Khalid Umar and junior headmaster is Rao Shahid Khalil.

== Accomplishments ==
This school has scored great accomplishments in the Board Exams and many positions in Board Exams.

== Notable alumni ==
- Bilal U. Haq, naturalist and poet
- Tariq Jamil, Islamic Scholar, Preacher. He also Studied here.
- Ishfaq Ahmad (computer scientist)
