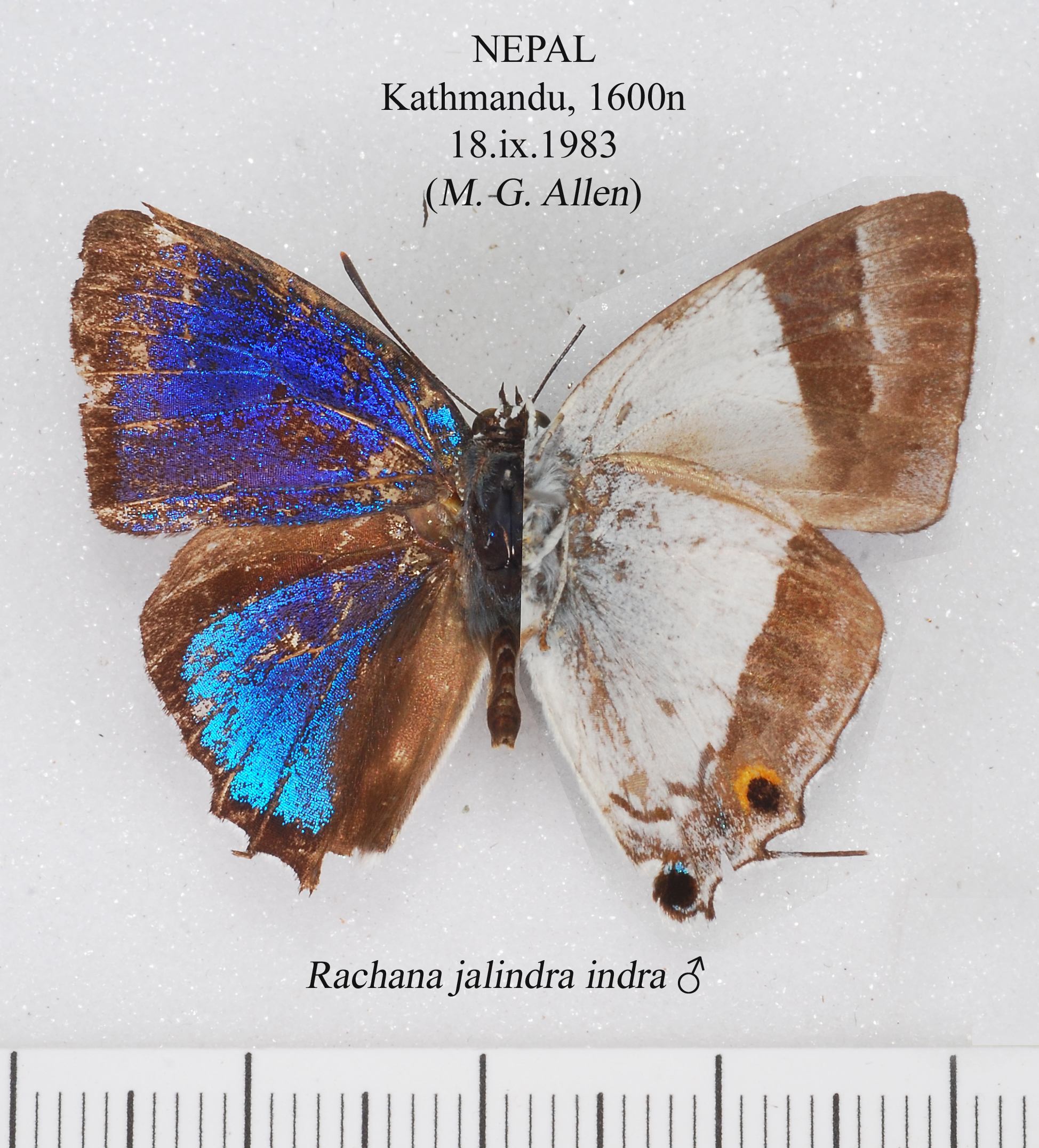
- Male
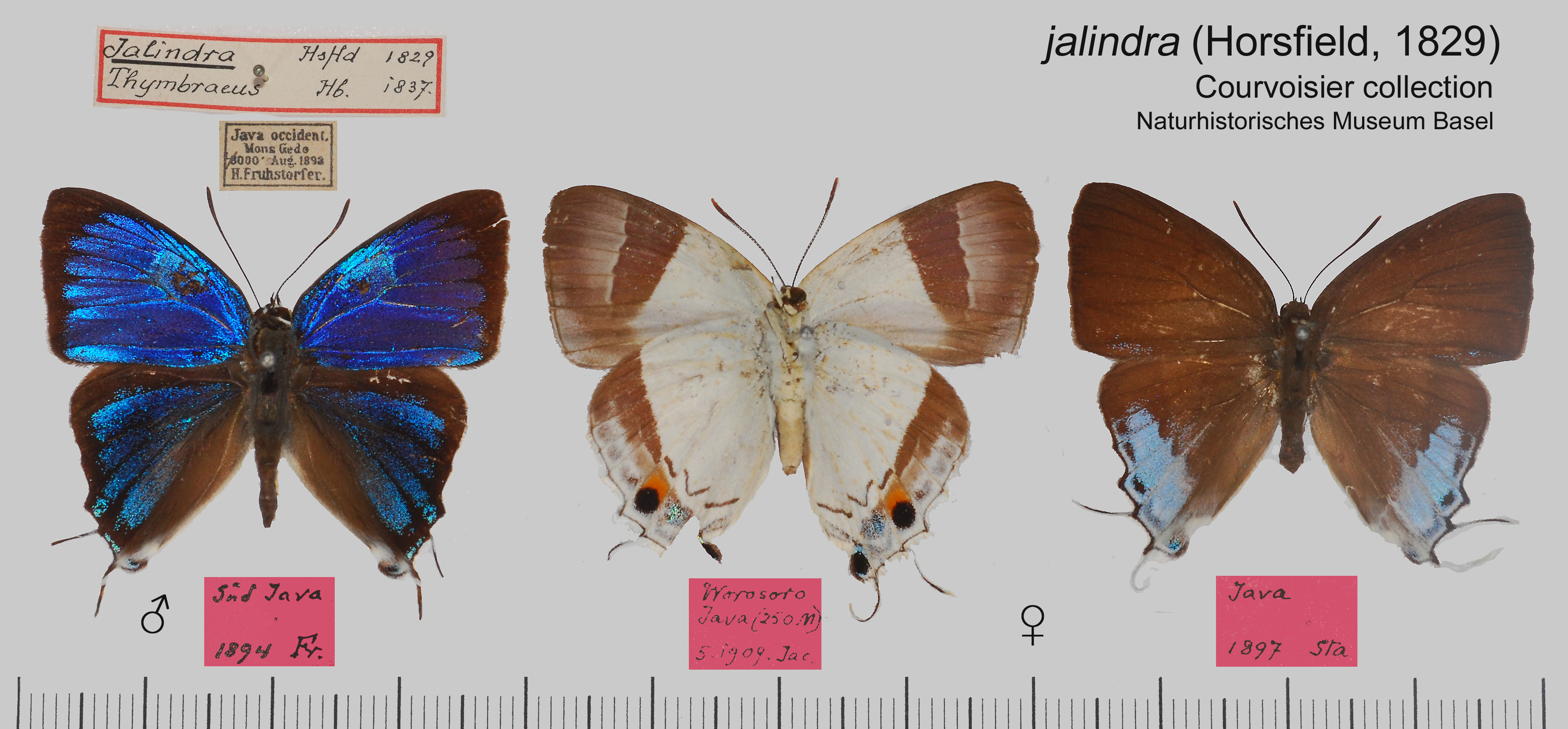
- From the Courvoisier Collection, Basel

Scientific classification
- Kingdom: Animalia
- Phylum: Arthropoda
- Class: Insecta
- Order: Lepidoptera
- Family: Lycaenidae
- Genus: Rachana
- Species: R. jalindra

Binomial name
- Rachana jalindra (Horsfield, 1829)

Synonyms
- Amblypodia jalindra Horsfield, [1829]; Myrina jalindra; Tajuria jalindra; Charana jalindra; Eliotia jalindra; Sithon thymbraeus Geyer, 1832; Sithon jalindra indra Moore, [1884]; Tajuria jalindra macanita Fruhstorfer, 1912; Myrina burbona Hewitson, 1878; Tajuria jalindra mingawa Fruhstorfer, 1914; Tajuria jalindra gamtara Fruhstorfer, 1912; Tajuria jalindra degenerata Fruhstorfer, 1897; Sithon jalindra var. palawandra Staudinger, 1889; Myrina tarpina Hewitson, 1878; Rachana jalindra australis Schröder & Treadaway, 1990

= Rachana jalindra =

Banded royal

Species of butterfly

Rachana jalindra, the banded royal, is a lycaenid or blue butterfly found in the Indomalayan realm. The species was first described by Thomas Horsfield in 1829.

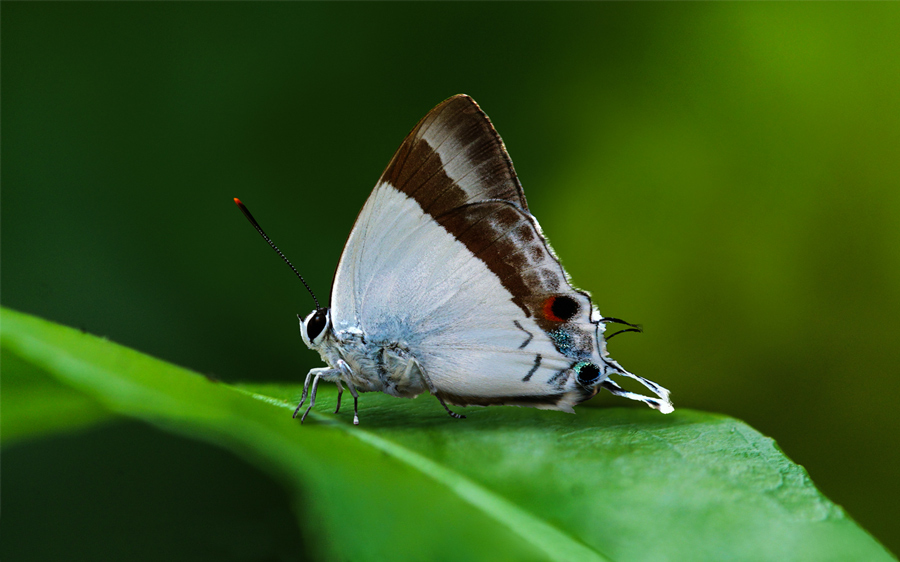

== Subspecies ==
- Rachana jalindra jalindra (Java)
- Rachana jalindra indra (Moore, [1884]) (Nepal, Sikkim to Thailand and Myanmar)
- Rachana jalindra macanita (Fruhstorfer, 1912) (southern India)
- Rachana jalindra burbona (Hewitson, 1878) (Sumatra, Peninsular Malaya)
- Rachana jalindra mingawa (Fruhstorfer, 1914) (south-western Borneo)
- Rachana jalindra gamtara (Fruhstorfer, 1912) (northern Borneo)
- Rachana jalindra degenerata (Fruhstorfer, 1897) (Nias)
- Rachana jalindra palawandra (Staudinger, 1889) (Palawan)
- Rachana jalindra tarpina (Hewitson, 1878) (Andamans)
- Rachana jalindra maganda Takanami, 1982
- Rachana jalindra shiraishii Takanami, 1984 (Philippines)
- Rachana jalindra mindorensis (Schröder & Treadaway, 1985)
- Rachana jalindra balabacensis (Schröder & Treadaway, 1986)
- Rachana jalindra obsoleta (Schröder & Treadaway, 1993)
