= Ishfaq Ahmad (computer scientist) =

Computer scientist and university professor

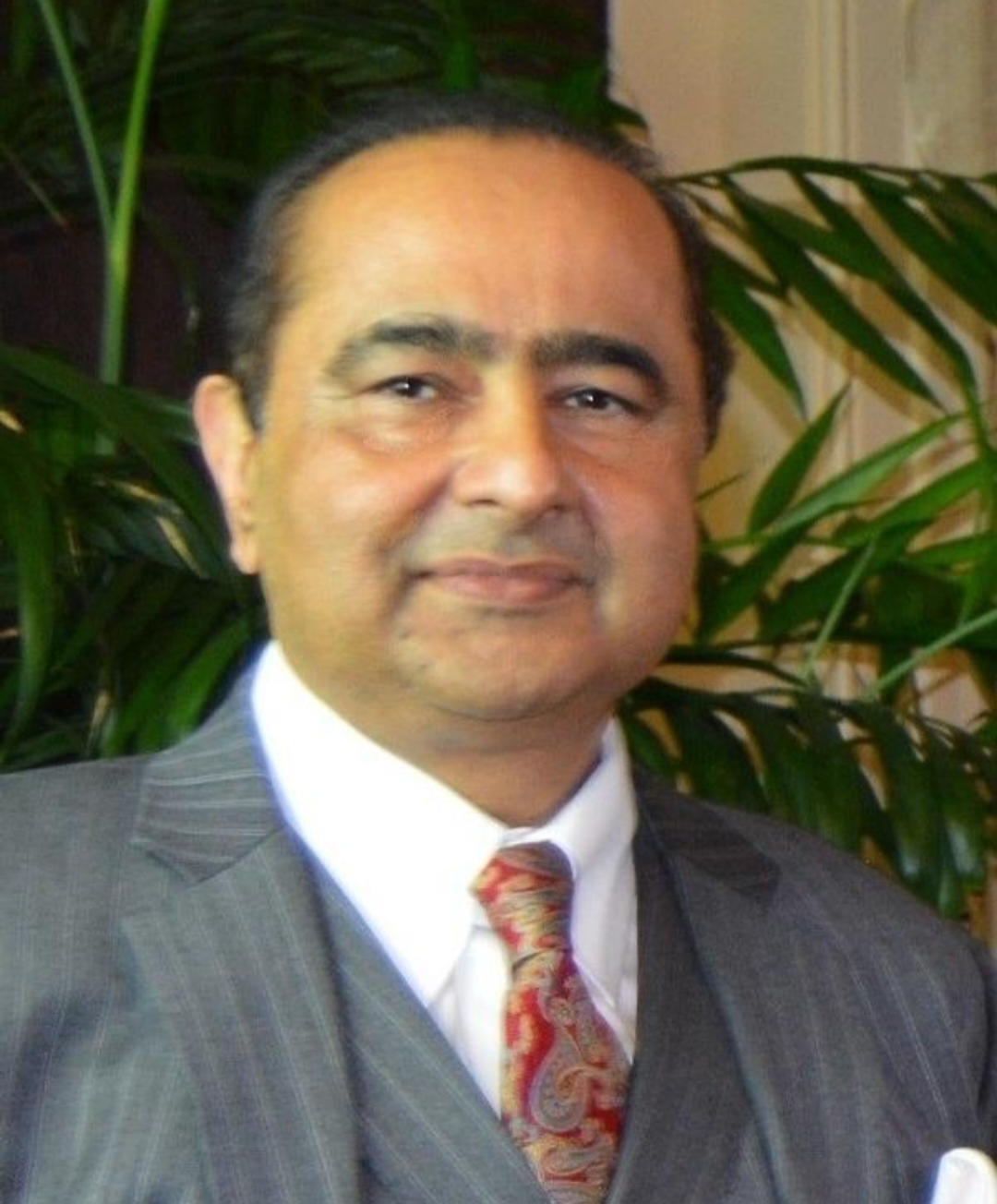
- Professor Ishfaq Ahmad
- Education: Government College University, Lahore; Central Model School, Lahore; Syracuse University; University of Engineering and Technology, Lahore
- Scientific career
- Fields: Computer Science
- Workplaces: University of Texas at Arlington; Hong Kong University of Science and Technology

Ishfaq Ahmad is a Pakistani American computer scientist, IEEE Fellow, and Professor of Computer Science and Engineering at the University of Texas at Arlington (UTA). He is the director of the Center for Advanced Computing Systems (CACS). He earned his master's degree and Ph.D. in Computer Science from Syracuse University, New York, U.S., in 1992, and his B.S. in Electrical Engineering from the University of Engineering and Technology, Lahore, Pakistan, in 1985. His early education was at the Central Model School and Government College University, Lahore.

== Career ==
Before joining UTA, he was an associate professor in the Department of Computer Science at the Hong Kong University of Science and Technology. While serving as a professor, he has held additional positions, including senior visiting scientist at the Chinese Academy of Sciences in Beijing, China; visiting lecturer at the Johnson Space Center in Houston, Texas; and frequent senior visiting scientist at the U.S. Air Force Research Laboratory in Rome, New York.

== Research ==
Ahmad's research focuses on parallel and distributed computing systems, with applications in multimedia systems and energy-aware sustainable computing. He is known for his work in parallel and distributed computing systems, with applications in multimedia systems and energy-aware sustainable computing, smart health, and video coding.

== Awards ==
Ahmad has received research awards, including:

- IEEE Circuits and Systems Society: 2007 Circuits and Systems for Video Technology Transactions Best Paper Award
- Outstanding Area Editor Award: 2008 IEEE Transactions on Circuits and Systems for Video Technology
- Honoree in Pride of Pakistan, Hall of Fame, and also a Fellow of IEEE

== Other appointments ==
In addition to being a full-time professor at the University of Texas at Arlington, Ahmad has held the following academic appointments.

- Fellow of the IEEE
- Member of the super-computing advisory board for Lifeboat Foundation
- Founding Editor-in-Chief of the journal Sustainable Computing: Informatics and Systems
- Co-founder of the International Green and Sustainable Computing (IGSC) Conference
- Founding Editor-in-Chief of Discover Internet of Things, Springer

In addition, he has served as editor of IEEE Transactions on Parallel and Distributed Systems, IEEE Distributed Systems Online, Journal of Parallel and Distributed Computing, IEEE Transactions on Circuits and Systems for Video Technology, and IEEE Transactions on Multimedia.

== Selected publications ==
- Ahmad, Ishfaq; Ranka, Sanjay (2012). Handbook of Energy-Aware and Green Computing. Vol. 1–2. CRC Press. OCLC 617637705.
- Ranka, Sanjay; Ahmad, Ishfaq (2021). Handbook of Exascale Computing. CRC Press. ISBN 978-1-4665-6900-3.
- Kwok, Y. K.; Ahmad, Ishfaq (1999). "Static scheduling algorithms for allocating directed task graphs to multiprocessors". ACM Computing Surveys. 31 (4): 406–471. doi:10.1145/344588.344618.
- Kwok, Yu-Kwong; Ahmad, Ishfaq (1996). "Dynamic critical-path scheduling: An effective technique for allocating task graphs to multiprocessors". IEEE Transactions on Parallel and Distributed Systems. 7 (5): 506–521. Bibcode:1996ITPDS...7..506Y. doi:10.1109/71.503776.
- Kwok, Yu-Kwong; Ahmad, Ishfaq (1999). "Benchmarking and comparison of the task graph scheduling algorithms". Journal of Parallel and Distributed Computing. 59 (3): 381–422. doi:10.1006/JPDC.1999.1578.
- Ahmad, Ishfaq; Wei, Xiaohui; Sun, Yu; Zhang, Ya-Qin (2005). "Video transcoding: an overview of various techniques and research issues". IEEE Transactions on Multimedia. 7 (5): 793–804. Bibcode:2005ITMm....7..793A. doi:10.1109/TMM.2005.854472.

== Bibliography ==
- Ishfaq Ahmad, The Perfect Human, Muhammad (PBUH), ISBN 978-1-7923-9118-7
