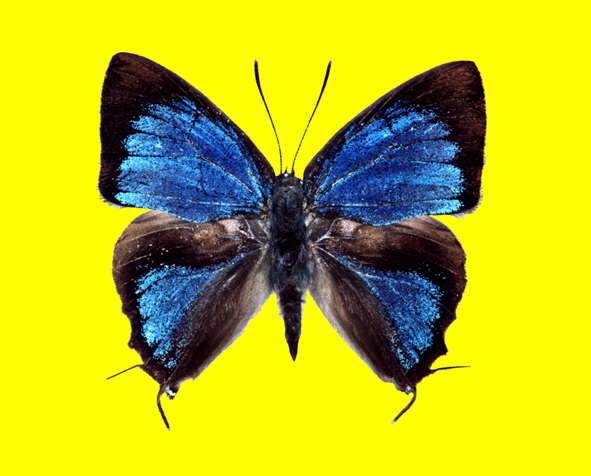
- Male upperside
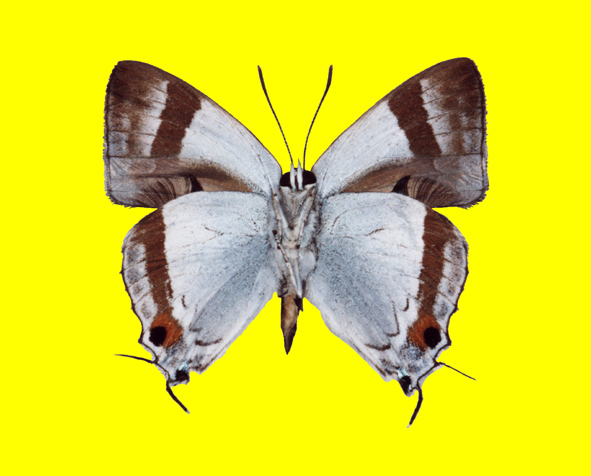
- Male underside

Scientific classification
- Kingdom: Animalia
- Phylum: Arthropoda
- Class: Insecta
- Order: Lepidoptera
- Family: Lycaenidae
- Genus: Rachana
- Species: R. mioae

Binomial name
- Rachana mioae (H. Hayashi, 1978)

Synonyms
- Eliotia mioae H. Hayashi, 1978

= Rachana mioae =

Species of butterfly

Rachana mioae is a butterfly of the family Lycaenidae first described by Hisakazu Hayashi in 1978. Eliotia mioae H. Hayashi, 1978 was moved to Rachana, because Eliotia is the junior homonym of a genus of marine animals (nudibranchs, family: Madrellidae) described in 1909.

Forewing length: 16–20 mm. It is endemic to the Philippines. It is uncommon and distributed on the islands of Mindanao and Leyte.

Etymology. The specific name is dedicated to the eldest daughter of the author.
