= University of Engineering and Technology, Kala Shah Kaku Campus =

Coordinates: 31.6833°N 74.2333°E

University of Engineering and Technology, New Campus
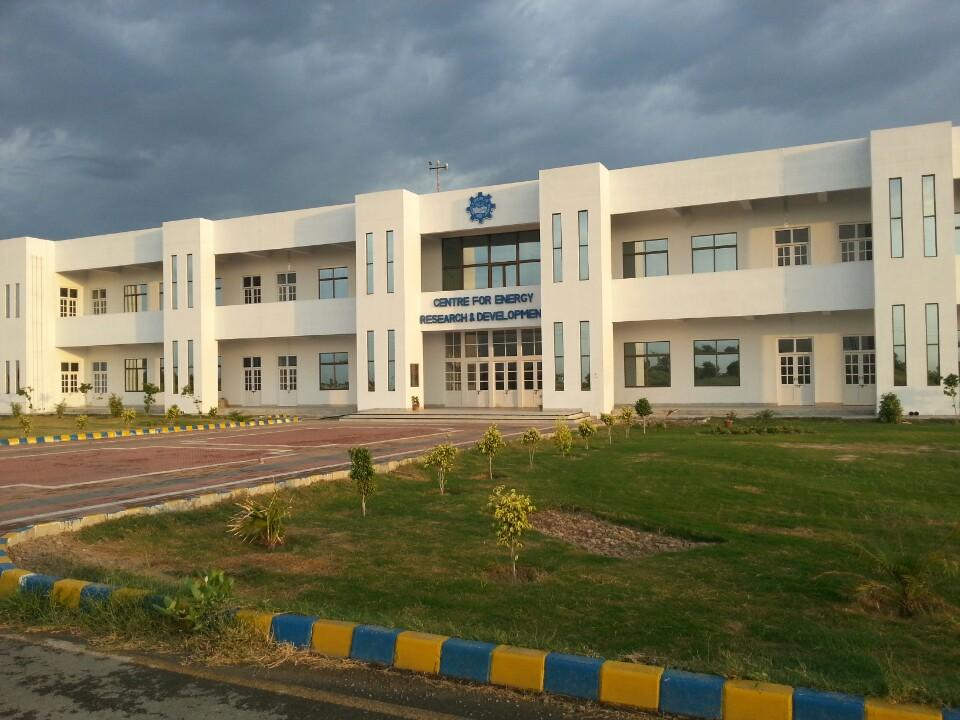
- Centre for Energy Research & Development
- Type: Public
- Established: 2006
- Affiliations: University of Engineering and Technology, Lahore, Pakistan Engineering Council, National Technology Council (Pakistan)
- Campus Coordinator: Prof. Dr. Shahid Imran
- Location: Near Kala Shah Kaku, Tehsil Ferozewala, Sheikhupura District, Punjab, Pakistan
- Nickname: UET New Campus

The University of Engineering and Technology, New Campus, also known as UET New Campus (formerly UET KSK Campus) is an extension of University of Engineering and Technology, Lahore (UET Lahore) located near the Kala Shah Kaku in Sheikhupura District, Punjab, Pakistan. It was inaugurated in 2006 by then President of Pakistan Pervez Musharraf. This campus spans over 313 acres. The campus is located at the hub of industries in the region. Industrial organizations such as ICI Power Generation LTD, Halla Enterprises, Mughal Steel, Fecto Belarus Tractors LTD, Dawood Hercules Chemicals LTD, Haseeb Waqas Engineering LTD, Sitara Chemical Industries are located in close proximity of campus and other diverse private sector organizations are located nearby. This gives an ideal environment for the students to benefit from both theoretical and practical aspects of academic programs.

== Departments ==
The campus has the following academic departments:

- Department of Food Science and Technology
- Department of Energy Engineering (Center for Energy Research and Development, CERAD)
- Department of Management Studies
- Department of Biomedical Engineering
- Department of Electrical, Electronics and Telecommunication Engineering
- Department of Chemical, Polymer and Composites Materials Engineering
- Department of Mechanical, Mechatronics and Manufacturing Engineering
- Department of Computer Sciences
- Department of Basic Sciences and Humanities
- Department of Software Engineering
- Department of Environmental Science

== Centre for Energy Research and Development ==
The Centre for Energy Research and Development (CERAD) is an organized research unit at New Campus, aimed at coordinating and promoting energy research, education and solutions to energy issues of Pakistan. It was inaugurated by then chief minister of the Punjab Shehbaz Sharif on 9 February 2013.

== See also ==
- UET Faisalabad Campus
- Rachna College of Engineering and Technology, Gujranwala
