= Ignite National Technology Fund =

Non-profit State owned company, Pakistan

- Formation: December 2016; 9 years ago
- Founded at: Islamabad, Pakistan
- Type: Non Profit Organization
- Legal status: Active
- Headquarters: Islamabad Capital Territory, Pakistan
- Location: Telecom Foundation Complex, 3rd Floor, 7 Mauve Area, G-9/4, Islamabad, Pakistan
- Products: Tech Innovation Grants; NIC Program; DigiSkills Training Program; NGIRI FYP Program
- Services: Online training Courses
- Owner: Government of Pakistan
- CEO of Ignite: Adeel Aijaz Shaikh (Acting Charge)
- Parent organization: Ministry of Information Technology and Telecommunication
- Website: ignite.org.pk
- Formerly called: National ICT R&D Fund

Ignite National Technology Fund or simply Ignite (formerly National ICT R&D Fund) is a non-profit company owned by the Government of Pakistan and administered by the Ministry of Information Technology and Telecommunication. It provides grants to startups and innovate projects, operates incubators and digital skills training programs through private sector partners, commissions studies that inform public sector policy and undertakes outreach to evangelize innovation and spread awareness about its programs amongst industry, academia, media and policy makers. Ignite was established in 2007 and is funded by mobile telecom operators, landline telecom operators and internet service providers (ISPs), in Pakistan by Government mandate.

Ignite is headed by a CEO, who is usually from the private sector. The CEO reports to a board of directors, comprising public and private personnel including representatives of telecom operators and ISP that fund Ignite.

Ignite has established National Incubation Centers (NICs) at Islamabad, Lahore, Peshawer, Karachi, Quetta, Hyderabad and Faisalabad.
