= Intellectual Property Organisation of Pakistan =

- دانشورانه املاک تنظیمِ پاکستان

Agency overview
- Formed: 8 May 2005; 20 years ago
- Jurisdiction: Government of Pakistan
- Headquarters: 3rd Floor, NTC-HQs Building, Ataturk Avenue (East), Sector G-5/2, Islamabad; 33°43′29.5″N 73°05′44.5″E
- Parent department: Cabinet Division (2005–2016); Ministry of Commerce (2016–present)
- Website: Intellectual Property Organisation of Pakistan

The Intellectual Property Organisation of Pakistan (Urdu: دانشورانه املاک تنظیمِ پاکستان, abbreviated as IPOP) is an autonomous institution of the Government of Pakistan, concerned with the regulation of copyright, trademark, patent, and other general types of intellectual property.

== History ==
IPOP was initially established as an autonomous body on 8 April 2005 under the administrative control of the Cabinet Division for integrated and efficient intellectual property management in the country, but its role and powers were further updated in 2012 through an Intellectual Property Organisation Act passed by the Parliament of Pakistan.

On 25 July 2016, the control of IPOP was transferred to Ministry of Commerce. Three offices (Copyright, Patent & Design, and Trademarks Registry) were incorporated under the revised management system.

Pakistan joined the World Intellectual Property Organization's Madrid system on 24 February 2021, becoming its 108th member.
