= Rachna College of Engineering & Technology =

College in Pakistan

Coordinates: 32.3610°N 74.2079°E

Rachna College of Engineering and Technology
- Type: Public
- Established: 2003
- Affiliations: University of Engineering and Technology, Lahore; Pakistan Engineering Council; National Computing Education Accreditation Council
- Principal: Dr. Haroon Farooq
- Location: Wazirabad, Punjab, Pakistan
- Nickname: RCET
- Website: rcet.uet.edu.pk

The Rachna College of Engineering and Technology (RCET) is a constituent college of University of Engineering and Technology, Lahore.

== History ==
Realizing the urgent need for technological and engineering education in the region, Government of the Punjab decided to set up an engineering college in 2002 by pooling together the resources of the government and regional industries. On 15 January 2003, the college was inaugurated by then Governor of the Punjab Khalid Maqbool. Previously, it was affiliated with the University of Engineering and Technology, Lahore. In 2006, its status was upgraded from affiliated college to constituent college.

== Departments ==
The college consists of the following departments:

- Department of Electrical Engineering
- Department of Mechanical Engineering
- Department of Industrial and Manufacturing Engineering
- Department of Computer Science
- Department of Natural Sciences and Humanities

== Degree programs ==
The college offers undergraduate and postgraduate programs in engineering and computer science.

=== Undergraduate ===
The college offers the following Bachelor of Science (BSc) degrees:

- BSc Electrical Engineering
- BSc Mechanical Engineering
- BSc Industrial and Manufacturing Engineering
- BSc (Hons) Computer Science
- BSc Computer Engineering [Started Since Fall 2025]

=== Postgraduate ===
The college offers Master of Science (MSc) degrees in the following disciplines:

- MSc Electrical Engineering
- MSc Mechanical Engineering
- MSc Computer Science (Started in Fall 2025)

=== Accreditation ===
The BSc engineering programs (Electrical, Mechanical, and Industrial & Manufacturing) are accredited by the Pakistan Engineering Council (PEC) under Level-II, signifying substantial equivalence to the Washington Accord. The BSc Computer Science program is accredited by the National Computing Education Accreditation Council (NCEAC).

== See also ==
- UET KSK Campus
- UET Faisalabad Campus
