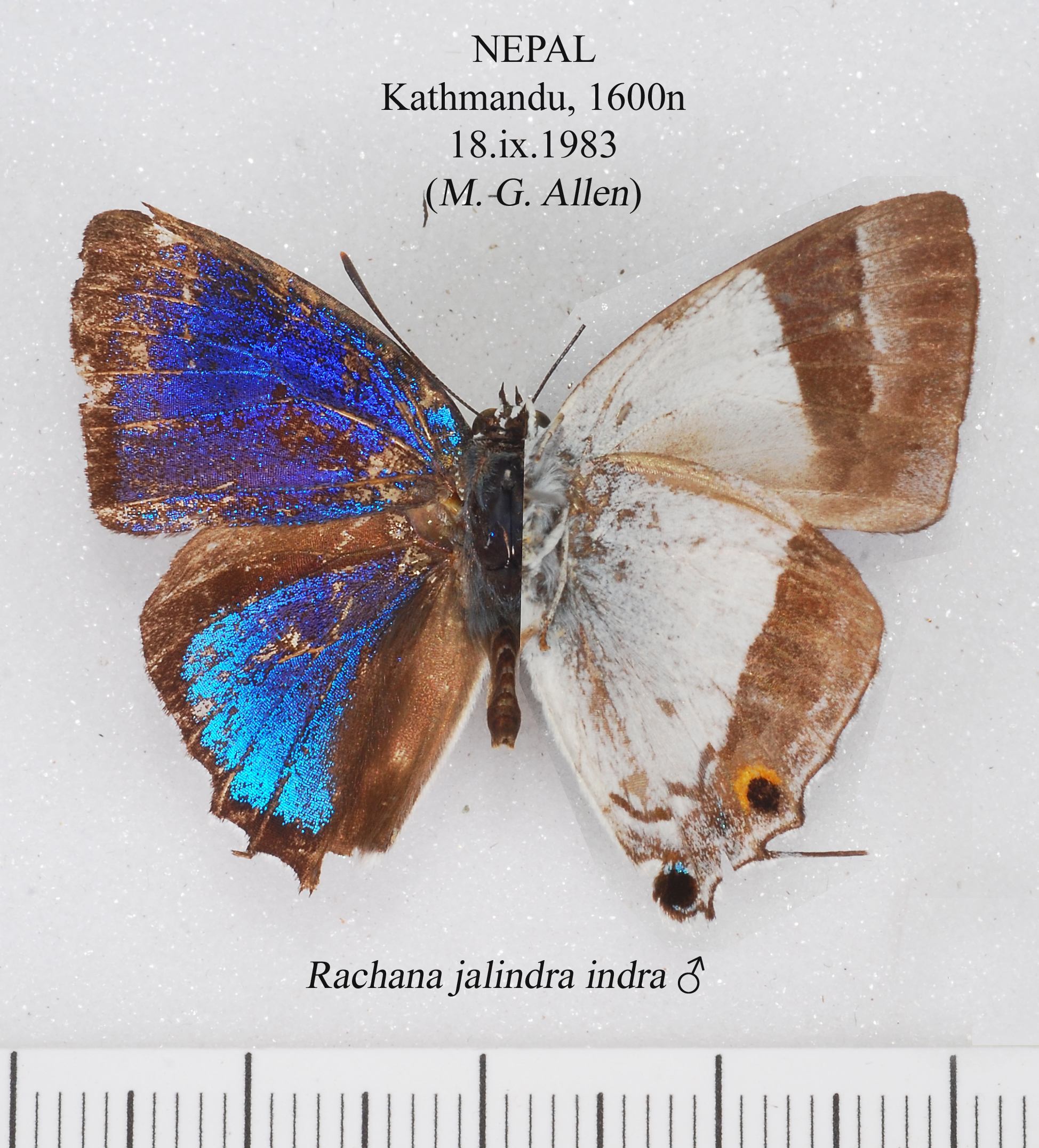
- Rachana jalindra

Scientific classification
- Kingdom: Animalia
- Phylum: Arthropoda
- Class: Insecta
- Order: Lepidoptera
- Family: Lycaenidae
- Tribe: Iolaini
- Genus: Rachana; Eliot, 1978

Synonyms
- Eliotia Hayashi, 1978 (preoccupied)

= Rachana (butterfly) =

Butterfly genus in family Lycaenidae

Rachana is a genus of butterflies in the family Lycaenidae.

== Species ==
- Rachana australis (Schroeder & Treadaway, 1990)
- Rachana circumdata (Schroeder, Treadaway & Hayashi, 1981)
- Rachana jalindra (Horsfield, 1829)
- Rachana mariaba (Hewitson, 1869)
- Rachana mioae (Hayashi, 1978)
- Rachana plateni (Semper, 1890)
