= Ministry of Information Technology and Telecommunication =

Government ministry of Pakistan

- وزارتِ برائے اطلاعی و بعید المواصلاتی ٹیکنالوجی

Agency overview
- Formed: November 2002; 24 years ago
- Jurisdiction: Government of Pakistan
- Headquarters: Islamabad
- Ministers responsible: Shaza Fatima Khawaja, Federal Minister (IT & Telecommunication); Zarrar Hasham Khan
- Agency executive: Pakistan Secretary of Information Technology
- Website: moitt.gov.pk

The Ministry of Information Technology and Telecommunication (Urdu: وزارتِ برائے اطلاعی و بعید المواصلاتی ٹیکنالوجی, romanized: vizārat-e-barāe ittilā'ī va ba'īd al-muvāsalātī ṭeknālojī), abbreviated as MoITT) is a Cabinet-level ministry of the Government of Pakistan concerned with Information Technology and Telecommunications.

== Organizations ==
=== Pakistan Telecommunication Authority ===
Pakistan Telecommunication Authority (PTA) is a telecom sector Regulator responsible for the establishment, operation and maintenance of telecommunications in Pakistan.

=== National Telecommunication Corporation ===
National Telecommunication Corporation (NTC) is a government-based IT and Telecom services provider corporation in Pakistan. NTC provides ICT service to Federal Government, Armed Forces, Defense Projects, Provincial Governments and to all Government Institutions.

=== Pakistan Software Export Board ===
Pakistan Software Export Board (PSEB) is an apex Government body mandated to promote Pakistan's IT Industry in local and international markets. PSEB facilitates the IT industry through a series of projects and programs in infrastructure development, human capital development, company capability development, international marketing, strategy and research and the promotion of innovation and technologies.

=== National IT Board ===
National Information Technology Board (NITB) or National IT Board was established in 2014 by merging Pakistan Computer Bureau and the Electronic Government Directorate.

=== Special Communication Organization ===
SCO is a public sector organization under the administrative control of the Ministry of IT & Telecom, established in 1976 to develop, operate and maintain telecom services in Azad Jammu & Kashmir and Gilgit Baltistan.

=== Telecom Foundation ===
Telecom Foundation (TF) is a Trust established for the Welfare of employees of public sector organizations in telecom sector. It achieves its targets through profit generation by setting-up Industrial Ventures and undertaking Commercial and service activities. It has established a number of Limited Companies.

=== Universal Service Fund ===
Universal Service Fund company was established in 2007 by the Government under Companies Ordinance 1984 to spread the benefits of the telecom revolution to all corners of Pakistan. Universal Service Fund promotes the development of telecommunication services in un-served and under-served areas throughout the country. The fund consists of contributions (1.5% of adjusted revenues) by the Telecom Operators with no Government funding involved. Universal Service Fund (USF) has an independent Board of Directors equally balanced between four members from the government and four from the private sector. The USF company in addition to rolling next generation broadband technology projects in under served and un served area of Pakistan, is also undertaking ICT for Girls program training young girls in coding and cloud computing skills.

USF has launched/planned a number of projects under the voice and high speed broadband data services program (3G/4G).

=== Virtual University of Pakistan ===
The Virtual University is Pakistan’s first University based completely on modern Information and Communication Technologies, was established by the Government as a public sector and not-for-profit institution.

=== Ignite National Technology Fund ===
The Ignite (National Technology Fund) company (Formerly National ICT R&D Fund) was established in January 2007 by Ministry of Information Technology & Telecom. The purpose behind the establishment of this R&D Fund is to support research and development projects proposed by industry and academia. This R&D fund is contributed in the form of a certain percentage of gross revenue generated by all telecom service providers in Pakistan. Ignite is undertaking some landmark projects in the country including National Incubation Centres and Digiskills program.

== Ministers ==
N°	Information technology and telecommunication minister		Term of office		
N°	Portrait	Name	Took office	Left office	Time in office
1		Awais Leghari	November 23, 2002	November 15, 2007	4 years, 357 days
2		Abdullah Riar (caretaker)	November 16, 2007	March 25, 2008	130 days
3	Portrait of Qamar Zaman Kaira	Qamar Zaman Kaira (additional charge)	April 12, 2008	November 3, 2008	205 days
4	Portrait of Latif Khosa	Latif Khosa (adviser; minister-in-charge from 27 March 2010)	February 6, 2010	July 18, 2010	162 days
5		Sardar Aseff Ahmad Ali	December 14, 2010	February 11, 2011	59 days
6		Babar Awan (additional charge)	March 29, 2011	April 12, 2011	14 days
7	Portrait of Raja Pervaiz Ashraf	Raja Pervez Ashraf	April 18, 2012	June 19, 2012	62 days
–	Vacant		June 20, 2012	April 3, 2013	287 days
8	Portrait of Sania Nishtar	Sania Nishtar (caretaker)	April 3, 2013	June 4, 2013	62 days
9	Portrait of Anusha Rahman Ahmad Khan	Anusha Rahman Ahmad Khan (minister of state; minister-in-charge from 25 March 2014)	June 7, 2013	July 28, 2017	4 years, 51 days
10	Portrait of Anusha Rahman Ahmad Khan	Anusha Rahman Ahmad Khan (minister of state until 26 April 2018; federal minister thereafter)	August 4, 2017	May 31, 2018	300 days
11		Muhammad Yusuf Shaikh (caretaker; additional portfolio)	June 6, 2018	August 18, 2018	73 days
12	Portrait of Khalid Maqbool Siddiqui	Khalid Maqbool Siddiqui	August 20, 2018	April 7, 2020	1 year, 231 days
13	Portrait of Syed Amin-ul-Haque	Syed Amin-ul-Haque	April 22, 2020	April 1, 2022	1 year, 344 days
14		Syed Amin-ul-Haque	April 19, 2022	August 10, 2023	1 year, 113 days
15	Portrait of Umar Saif	Umar Saif (caretaker; also Science and Technology)	August 17, 2023	March 4, 2024	200 days
16	Portrait of Shaza Fatima Khawaja	Shaza Fatima Khawaja (minister of state until 27 February 2025; federal minister thereafter)	March 12, 2024	Incumbent	2 years, 236 days

== See also ==
- Communications in Pakistan
- Information technology in Pakistan
- Ministry of Maritime Affairs (Pakistan)
- Pakistan Telecommunication Company Limited (PTCL)
