= Taseer =

Taseer is a Pakistani name. It may refer to:

- Aatish Taseer (born 1980), a journalist and writer, son of Salmaan Taseer and Tavleen Singh
- M. D. Taseer (1902–1950), a Pakistani poet, writer and literary critic, father of Salmaan Taseer
- Salmaan Taseer (1944–2011), a Pakistani politician, who served as Governor of Punjab
- Shahbaz Taseer, a Pakistani businessman, who was kidnapped, son of Salman Taseer
- Taseer Tribe, a south asian caste that used to be a tribe also spelled as "Tasir"

== See also ==
- Taysir (disambiguation)
