= Shafqat Emmanuel and Shagufta Kausar blasphemy case =

Pakistani Christians convicted of blasphemy

Shafqat Emmanuel and Shagufta Kausar
- شفقت عمانوایل اور شگفتہ کوثر
- Born: Shafqat Emmanuel and Shagufta Kausar
- Known for: Sentenced to death for blasphemy

Shafqat Emmanuel and Shagufta Kausar are a Pakistani Christian couple who in 2014 were convicted of blasphemy by a Pakistani court, receiving a sentence of death by hanging. In 2021, the convictions were overturned.

== The couple ==
Married couple Shafqat Emmanuel and Shagufta Kausar were living in poverty with their four children in a mission compound of Gojra Church in Toba Tek Singh District in Punjab, Pakistan. Kausar was the only working person in the family. Emmanuel used a wheelchair, due to an accident in 2004 that resulted him in suffering a spinal injury, causing him to be paralyzed below the chest. According to Shagufta, the injury was caused by a stray bullet that hit him.

== Prosecution ==
In July 2013, Emmanuel and Kausar were arrested for sending a text message that was deemed blasphemous against the Islamic prophet Muhammad. In an interview with Aid to the Church in Need, Shagufta stated the following: "In the police station, we were tortured. The officers told my husband that if he didn't confess, they would strip me naked and make me run in the street. The police also hanged Shafqat upside down and beat him with the back of a rifle." Under severe pressure, Shafqat confessed, even though they were both innocent.

On 4 April 2014, the illiterate couple were given death sentences for sending the message in English. Despite the couple being illiterate, the additional session judge of Toba Tek Singh sentenced them death on 4 April 2014. They are the first Pakistani couple to have been given the death sentence for blasphemy. The couple said that the complainants' lawyers kept proclaiming Koranic references that called for death to blasphemers. Even the prosecuting attorneys told the judge that if he will not give them death sentence, they would be ready to become ghazi (Muslim warriors), like Ilm-ud-din and Mumtaz Qadri. Due to the high risk to the couple's security, the whole trial was concluded inside the boundary walls of the prison. In the beginning, the couple were defended by the Farrukh Saif Foundation and their Partner Emergency Rescue Committee. They filed the appeal in the Apex Court against the death sentence. According to Shagufta, neither she nor her husband were allowed to testify, and their lawyers were not allowed to make their closing arguments.

While on death row, Shagufta was offered the possibility of converting to Islam and possibly having her sentence commuted. "Several times I was told that if I converted to Islam my death sentence would be turned into life in prison, and that eventually I would be released. I always said no", she claimed, in an interview with Aid to the Church in Need. At one point she was in the same prison as Asia Bibi. Their cells were close together. "For a while Asia Bibi, who was also sentenced to death on false charges of blasphemy, was my neighbour on death row in Multan. Whenever we met, we used to pray together, console each other and renew our firm faith in Jesus Christ. At Christmas time we would share cake with other Muslim and Christian prisoners. When I heard that Asia was set free, my heart was filled with joy, and I was convinced that one day I too would be released".

== Appeal against the death sentence ==
On 8 April 2014, the Farrukh Saif Foundation filed appeal against the death sentence of Emmanuel and Kausar. Eventually, the family decided to switch organizations. With support from a coalition of various Christian international organizations from the West, they hired the Pakistani lawyer and human rights defender Saif-Ul-Malook, who worked tirelessly for their cause. He had also represented Asia Bibi and secured her acquittal on 31 October 2018.

In April 2021, the European Parliament passed a motion condemning Pakistan for failing to protect religious minorities, focusing on the case of Ms Kausar and Mr Emmanuel.

On 3 June 2021, the Lahore High Court overturned the convictions due to lack of evidence. Shagufta, Shafqat, and their family remain eternally grateful for the efforts of Members of the European Parliament in advocating for their case and demanding their freedom. After their acquittal, the couple were unable to remain in Pakistan, due to lack of safety, and were given asylum in a European country.

Speaking at a conference in Rome, organised by pontifical foundation Aid to the Church in Need, Shagufta compared her release to that of St Peter, as described in the Bible. "“One day I was reading the Acts of the Apostles, when Paul and Silas are in prison and an earthquake opens the doors. Just as I was reading that I felt an actual earthquake. Everything was shaking and the guards were shouting. But after a while there was another sort of earthquake. There was a petition in Holland calling for me to be set free. Sixteen thousand people signed the petition in only one day, and it was delivered to the Embassy of Pakistan. And then the European Parliament approved a resolution, with over 600 votes, threatening Pakistan with repercussions if we were not released. This was a movement led not only by Christians, but also by many secular people. This was for us a miracle.”

== Book regarding her experience ==
In 2024, Shagufta Kausar published her book, Under Threat of Death: A Mother's Faith in the Face of Injustice, Imprisonment, and Persecution, co-written with author Eugene Bach. The book recounts Shagufta's experiences growing up in Pakistan, her arrest, and her time in prison. She shares how her faith as a Christian and the comfort she received from God sustained her through these trials.

She also highlighted the important role her brother, Joseph Janssen, played in the fight for her freedom and eventual acquittal.
