= Asia Bibi blasphemy case =

2009 Pakistani criminal case

Asia Bibi v. The State
- Court: Supreme Court of Pakistan
- Full case name: Mst. Asia Bibi v. The State etc.
- Decided: 31 October 2018
- Transcript: Judgement

Case history
- Appealed from: Court of Session at Sheikhapura
- Appealed to: Lahore High Court (rejected 16 October 2014)
- Subsequent actions: Supreme Court of Pakistan; Judgement of lower courts reversed

Court membership
- Judges sitting: Mian Saqib Nisar; Asif Saeed Khosa; Mazhar Alam Miankhel

Case opinions
- Decision by: Nisar
- Concurrence: Khosa

Keywords
- death sentence; blasphemy

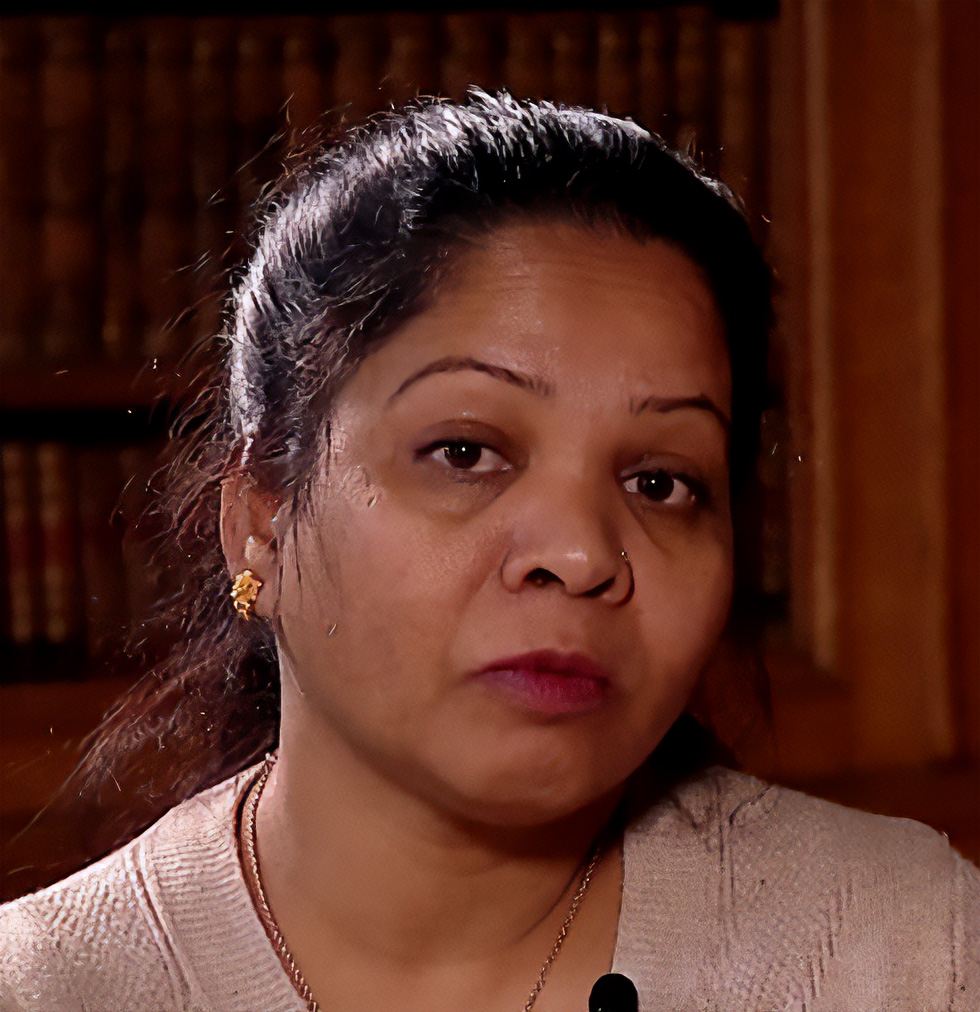
Asia Bibi in February 2020

In 2010, a Pakistani Christian woman, Aasiya Noreen (Urdu: آسیہ نورین, romanized: Āsiyāh Naurīn, [ˈɑːsiɑː nɔːˈriːn]; born c. 1971), commonly known as Asia Bibi (آسیہ بی بی) or Aasiya Bibi, was convicted of blasphemy by a Pakistani court and was sentenced to death by hanging. In October 2018, the Supreme Court of Pakistan acquitted her based on insufficient evidence, though she was not allowed to leave Pakistan until the verdict was reviewed. She was held under armed guard and was not able to leave the country until 7 May 2019; she arrived in Canada the next day.

In June 2009, Noreen was accused of blasphemy after an argument with co-workers while harvesting berries. She was subsequently arrested and imprisoned. In November 2010, a Sheikhupura judge sentenced her to death by hanging. The verdict was upheld by Lahore High Court on appeal and received worldwide attention. Various petitions for her release were created by organisations aiding persecuted Christians such as Voice of the Martyrs, including one that received 400,000 signatures; Pope Benedict XVI and Pope Francis called for the charges to be dismissed. She received less sympathy in comparison in the country, where some adamantly called for her to be executed. Minorities Minister Shahbaz Bhatti and Punjab Governor Salmaan Taseer were both assassinated for advocating on her behalf and opposing the blasphemy laws. Noreen's family went into hiding after receiving death threats by Islamic fundamentalists. Muslim cleric Maulana Yousaf Qureshi announced a bounty of 500,000 Pakistani rupees to anyone who would kill her.

On 31 October 2018, the Supreme Court of Pakistan acquitted Noreen, citing "material contradictions and inconsistent statements of the witnesses" which "cast a shadow of doubt on the prosecution's version of facts." The decision sparked protests headed by Islamist parties in major cities of the country, but was praised by human rights groups and those advocating on behalf of Christian minorities, such as International Christian Concern, Open Doors and Aid to the Church in Need. On 2 November 2018, however, the Government of Pakistan signed an agreement with the Tehreek-e-Labbaik political party (TLP), which was leading the protests; this agreement barred Noreen from leaving the country. It led to accusations that the executive was capitulating to extremists. Italy, Canada, as well as other Western countries worked to help her leave Pakistan. On 7 November 2018, she was released from the New Jail for Women in Multan. However, by Christmas, she was reported to have spent Christmas Day in some form of custody.

On 29 January 2019, a petition requesting an appeal against the court's decision to acquit Noreen was rejected, "lifting the last legal hurdle in the case and paving the way for her to leave the country." On 11 April 2019, Prime Minister Imran Khan (who had previously attacked hardliners appealing them to be calm) stated that a "complication" had delayed her departure from the country. On 8 May 2019, she landed in Canada and was reported to be doing well. The blasphemy law in Pakistan has resulted in the extrajudicial killings, incited by accusations, of over 60 people, has been blamed for dozens of communal attacks that have taken place against religious minorities on the pretext of blasphemy; it has been used by individuals as a tool for revenge against other people. Noreen was the first woman in Pakistan to be sentenced to death for blasphemy and would have been the first person in Pakistan to be executed for blasphemy under the current law.

== Background and arrest (2009–2010) ==
Aasiya Noreen was born and raised in Ittan Wali, a small, rural village in the Sheikhupura District of Punjab, Pakistan, thirty miles outside of Lahore. Christians in the district, and elsewhere in Pakistan, are usually marginalized and face discrimination in employment, education, and social services, and relegated to public sanitation, sewer cleaning, and other low-level menial jobs. Noreen, who is a Catholic, worked as a farmhand in Sheikhupura to support her family. She married Ashiq Masih, a brick laborer who had three children from a previous marriage, and had two children with him. Noreen and her family were the only Christians in the village. Before her incarceration, she had been repeatedly urged by her fellow workers to convert to Islam.

In June 2009, Noreen was harvesting falsa berries with a group of other women farmhands in a field in Sheikhupura. She was asked at one point to fetch water from a nearby well; she complied but stopped to take a drink with an old metal cup she had found lying next to the well. A neighbor of Noreen, Musarat, who had been involved in a running feud with Noreen's family about some property damage, saw her and angrily told her that it was forbidden for a Christian to drink water from the same utensil from which Muslims drink, and that some of the other workers considered her to be unclean because she was a Christian, referring to the caste system in Pakistan. Noreen recounts that when they made derogatory statements about Christianity and demanded that she convert to Islam, she responded, "I believe in my religion and in Jesus Christ, who died on the cross for the sins of mankind. What did your Prophet Mohammed ever do to save mankind? And why should it be me that converts instead of you?" An argument ensued.

A mob came to her house, beating her and members of her family before she was taken away by the police. The police initiated an investigation about her remarks, resulting in her arrest under Section 295-C of the Pakistan Penal Code.

In an interview with CNN, local police officer Muhammad Ilyas claimed that Noreen said that "the Quran is fake and your prophet remained in bed for one month before his death because he had worms in his ears and mouth. He married Khadija just for money and after looting her kicked her out of the house". Village Imam Qari Muhammad Salim, to whom Noreen's coworkers reported the alleged blasphemy, claimed that Noreen confessed to him and apologized. On the other hand, the Asian Human Rights Commission published a letter that stated:

Five days after the incident, a local Muslim leader, Qari Salem, jumped into the matter and pressured some people in the area to claim that she committed blasphemy. When finding no way to get Ms. Bibi to confess, Salem used the loudspeakers of the mosque, as other Muslim leaders usually do in the cases of alleged blasphemy acts, to spread the news of blasphemy and instigate the people of the locality to punish the alleged blasphemer. The people of the locality beat her severely in the presence of her children.

She was subsequently imprisoned for over a year before being formally charged.

== Prosecution and imprisonment ==
Noreen denied that she had committed blasphemy and said that she had been accused by her neighbor to "settle an old score". In November 2010, Muhammad Naveed Iqbal, a judge at the court of Sheikhupura, Punjab, sentenced her to death by hanging. Additionally, a fine the equivalent of $1,100, was imposed on her.

With the verdict, she became the first woman condemned to death in Pakistan on blasphemy charges. Noreen described the day of her sentencing as follows:

I cried alone, putting my head in my hands. I can no longer bear the sight of people full of hatred, applauding the killing of a poor farm worker. I no longer see them, but I still hear them, the crowd who gave the judge a standing ovation, saying: "Kill her, kill her! Allahu Akbar!" The court house is invaded by a euphoric horde who break down the doors, chanting: "Vengeance for the holy prophet. Allah is great!" I was then thrown like an old rubbish sack into the van ... I had lost all humanity in their eyes.

Noreen's husband, Ashiq Masih, 51 years old at the time, announced that he planned to appeal the verdict, which has to be upheld by the Lahore High Court. A month later, Salmaan Taseer, the governor of Punjab who investigated the affair for President Asif Ali Zardari, stated that Noreen would most likely be pardoned if the High Court did not suspend the sentence. Zardari was poised to grant pardon, but the High Court issued a stay order against a potential presidential pardon, which remains in force to date. Court transcripts showed numerous inconsistencies in the evidence presented, and reporters said they dared not repeat Noreen's testimony lest they also be accused of blasphemy.

Noreen was put in solitary confinement in an 8-by-10-foot (2.4 m × 3.0 m) cell without windows at the Lahore prison. Before his assassination, Taseer visited her at the jail several times with his wife, Aamna, and daughter, Shehrbano, though Pakistani court officials later ruled that she could be visited only by her husband and lawyer. Khalid Sheikh, the prison superintendent, said that while he wanted her to be treated "like any other prisoner", she had to be kept away from other inmates for her own well-being, as other individuals accused of blasphemy had been killed while in prison. The Masihi Foundation, a human rights group, described her physical condition as "very frail", and her health was reported to be in decline due to poor living conditions at the jail. She has also been threatened by other inmates and subjected to physical abuse from prison guards.

According to Human Rights Watch, Noreen's situation is not unusual. Though no one has been executed for blasphemy yet in Pakistan, the accused often remain imprisoned for a long time while the case is being processed. In May 2014, Noreen's appeal hearing was delayed for the fifth time.

=== Local reaction ===
Noreen's conviction led to divided opinions on the blasphemy laws and drew strong reactions from the public. Pakistani Human Rights Watch researcher Ali Dayan Hasan said, "The law creates this legal infrastructure which is then used in various informal ways to intimidate, coerce, harass and persecute." He further described the law as "discriminatory and abusive". Punjab Governor Salmaan Taseer and Pakistan's Minority Affairs Minister Shahbaz Bhatti both publicly supported Noreen, with the latter saying, "I will go to every knock for justice on her behalf and I will take all steps for her protection." She also received support from Pakistani political scientist Rasul Baksh Rais and local priest Samson Dilawar. The imprisonment of Noreen left Christians and other minorities in Pakistan feeling vulnerable, and liberal Muslims were also unnerved by her sentencing.

The general population was less sympathetic towards Noreen. Several signs were erected in Sheikhupura and other rural areas declaring support for the blasphemy laws, including one that called for Noreen to be beheaded. Mohammad Saleem, a member of the Jamiat Ulema-e-Pakistan party, organized a demonstration in Rawalpindi and led a small crowd chanting, "Hang her, hang her." In December 2010, a month after Noreen's conviction, Maulana Yousaf Qureshi, the Muslim cleric of the Mohabaat Khan Mosque in Peshawar, announced a Rs. 500000 (US$1,800) Pakistani rupee bounty to anyone who would kill her. One survey reported that around 10 million Pakistanis had said that they would be willing to personally kill her out of either religious conviction or for the reward. The village mosque in Ittan Wali was reportedly indifferent towards Noreen's plight; its imam, who helped register the case against her, Qari Mohammed Salim, stated that he had wept for joy on learning that she had been sentenced to death and threatened that some people would "take the law into their own hands" should she be pardoned or released. However, journalist Julie McCarthy suggested that the country's "more peaceful majority views" had been overshadowed by the more vocal fundamentalists.

Noreen's family has received threats and has gone into hiding. Ashiq, her husband, stated that he was afraid to let their children go outside. He also expressed concern about how Noreen would be kept safe should she be released, saying, "No one will let her live. The mullahs are saying they will kill her when she comes out." Her family declined to leave the country while she remained in prison. Italy, France, and Spain all offered to grant her and her family asylum in the event of her release.

==== Assassinations of Taseer and Bhatti ====
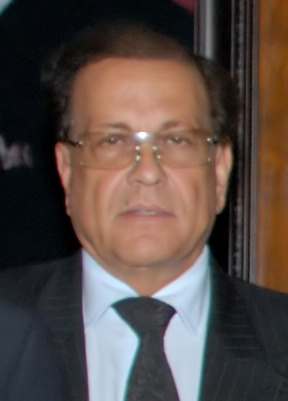
Salmaan Taseer

On 4 January 2011, at Kohsar Market of Islamabad, governor of Punjab Salmaan Taseer was assassinated by Malik Mumtaz Hussein Qadri, a 26-year-old member of his security team, because of his defence of Noreen and opposition to the blasphemy law. Mumtaz Qadri was sentenced to death for the assassination and hanged on 29 February 2016. Taseer was outspoken in his criticism of the law and the verdict in Noreen's case. The next day, thousands turned up for the governor's funeral in Lahore in spite of warnings by the Taliban and some clerics, while a portion of the Pakistani population also praised Qadri as a hero; thousands of Sunni Muslims rallied in support of the blasphemy laws in Pakistan after the murder, and 500 Barelvi clerics prohibited their followers from sending condolences to the family of Taseer. This resulted in concerns that the public was becoming tolerant of extremists.

Prison officials said that Noreen "wept inconsolably" on learning of Taseer's assassination while repeatedly saying, "That man came here and he sacrificed his life for me." Father Andrew Nisari, a senior Catholic spokesperson in Lahore, described the situation as "utter chaos". Seven months later, in August 2011, Taseer's 28-year-old son, Shahbaz, was kidnapped. Shahbaz Taseer was later found or released in March 2016, and he returned to Lahore on 9 March after five years in captivity.

Minister for Minorities at the time, Shahbaz Bhatti said that he was first threatened with death in June 2010 when he was told that he would be beheaded if he attempted to change the blasphemy laws. In response, he told reporters that he was "committed to the principle of justice for the people of Pakistan" and willing to die fighting for Noreen's release. On 2 March 2011, Bhatti was shot dead by gunmen who ambushed his car near his residence in Islamabad, presumably because of his position on the blasphemy laws. He had been the only Christian member of Pakistan's cabinet.

=== International response ===
Noreen's death sentence drew international outrage and strong condemnation from non-governmental organizations defending persecuted Christians, as well as human rights groups such as Amnesty International and Human Rights Watch who saw the blasphemy laws as a form of religious persecution and called for them to be abolished. Pope Benedict XVI publicly called for clemency for Noreen. In his statement, he described his "spiritual closeness" with Noreen and urged that the "human dignity and fundamental rights of everyone in similar situations" be respected.

Her case also achieved extensive media coverage, and American journalist John L. Allen Jr. wrote that she is "almost certainly the most famous illiterate Punjabi farm worker and mother of five on the planet". According to Allen, she has become a celebrity among Christian activists, an unusual instance when cases of discrimination against Christian minorities typically receive little attention in the press. A number of campaigns have been organized to protest her imprisonment through online petitions, Twitter trends, and concerts. Ooberfuse, a Christian pop band based in the United Kingdom collaborated with the British Pakistani Christian Association, and released a song titled "Free Asia Bibi" with a music video that included "a disturbing visual portrayal of the squalid prison conditions where Bibi is being held". She has also been the subject of books and documentaries.

One petition created by the Voice of the Martyrs, an organisation aiding persecuted Christians, received over 400,000 signatures from individuals from over 100 countries. Another petition, organised by the American Center for Law & Justice (ACLJ), obtained over 200,000 signatures and called for America's aid to Pakistan (said to be cumulatively eight billion dollars) to stop whilst persecution of minorities is allowed in that country.

Umar Al-Qadri, an Islamic cleric in Ireland, called for Noreen's release and stated he would back organisations wishing the same, holding that, "Asia Bibi is a case where the lady is denying that she committed blasphemy, and based on that it would be sufficient for the court to release her, but unfortunately that particular law, the blasphemy law in Pakistan, does not represent the true Islamic teaching".

== Appeals (2014–2017) ==
On 16 October 2014, the Lahore High Court dismissed Noreen's appeal and upheld her death sentence. On 20 November 2014, her husband appealed to the President of Pakistan for clemency. On 24 November 2014, her lawyer appealed to the Supreme Court of Pakistan.

On 22 July 2015, the Supreme Court suspended Noreen's death sentence for the duration of the appeals process. In November 2015, her lead attorney, Naeem Shakir, announced that, after two postponements in 2015, the Supreme Court would hear an appeal in Noreen's case on 26 March 2016. The hearing was rescheduled for 13 October 2016, but on that morning when it was the turn of the case "Asia Bibi against the state", one of the three members of the bench of judges of that section – Iqbal Hameedur Rehman – refused to be part of the bench, which led to the postponement of the hearing to an undetermined date. The Judge later resigned in a handwritten letter addressed to Mamnoon Hussain, the President of Pakistan, without stating any specific reasons for his resignation. On 26 April 2017, Chief Justice of Pakistan (CJP) Mian Saqib Nisar declined a request for the early hearing of the case in the first week of June made by her lawyer Saiful Malook.

== Supreme Court acquittal (October 2018) ==
Asia's lawyer Saif Ul Malook spoke about the case at the Secular Conference on 25 November 2018, invited by Maryam Namazie shortly after he fled to the Netherlands.

On 8 October 2018, a three-judge bench comprising CJP Mian Saqib Nisar, Justice Asif Saeed Khosa and Justice Mazhar Alam reserved its judgement on the final legal appeal. On 31 October 2018, the Supreme Court in a 56-page detailed judgement authored by Nisar, with a separate concurring opinion note from Khosa, acquitted Asia Bibi of blasphemy charges after accepting her 2015 appeal against her sentence. The court also ruled that "she was free to go, if not wanted in connection with any other case". In his verdict, Khosa noted:

The statements made by Muhammad Idrees (CW1) and Muhammad Amin Bukhari, SP (Investigation) (PW6) before the trial court revealed that the alleged blasphemy had been committed by the Christian appellant after her Muslim co-workers had insulted the appellant's religion and had injured her religious sensibilities only because she believed in and was a follower of Jesus Christ. According to the Holy Qur'an a Muslim's faith is not complete till he believes in all the Holy Prophets and Messengers of Almighty Allah including Jesus Christ (Isa son of Maryam) (Peace Be Upon Him) and all the revealed Holy Books of Almighty Allah including the Holy Bible. From that perspective insulting the appellant's religion by her Muslim co-workers was no less blasphemous.

The final judgement said that one of Noreen's accusers violated the Ashtiname of Muhammad, a "covenant made by Muhammad with Christians in the seventh century but still valid today". Khosa also stated that the two women who made accusations against Noreen "had no regard for the truth" and that the claim that she blasphemed Muhammad in public was a "concoction incarnate". The Supreme Court of Pakistan's ruling cited "material contradictions and inconsistent statements of the witnesses" that "cast a shadow of doubt on the prosecution's version of facts."

Upon hearing the news, Asia Bibi exclaimed: "I can't believe what I am hearing, will I go out now? Will they let me out, really? ... I just don't know what to say, I am very happy, I can't believe it." Noreen's daughter Eisham Ashiq, said that the news of the acquittal was "the most wonderful moment in my life ... I want to hug my mother and then celebrate with my family. I am grateful to God for listening to our prayers."

=== Domestic response and challenge to the acquittal ===
In response to the verdict, Islamist groups protested in the streets of Pakistan, "blocking roads and damaging infrastructure". The Supreme Court decision sparked protests in Lahore, Islamabad, Karachi, Peshawar and Multan. JUI-F chief Fazal-ur-Rehman called for "peaceful" protests, stating that Noreen's release was "not acceptable at any cost". Tehreek-e-Labbaik Pakistan (TLP) chief Khadim Hussain Rizvi and Jamaat-i-Ahle Hadees also called for protests. Protesters belonging to the TLP party said traffic will "remain blocked until Asia Bibi is hanged". and Islamabad's main highway was blocked by "approximately a thousand club-wielding demonstrators". Muhammad Afzal Qadri, a TLP co-founder, also called for the death of the three Supreme Court justices involved in hearing the appeal, stating: "The Chief Justice and two others deserve to be killed ... Either their security guards, their drivers, or their chefs should kill them." The Red Zone of Islamabad was sealed off from the public in order to keep protesters away, with paramilitary forces being deployed to this end. Prime Minister Imran Khan, in a televised address to the nation on the Asia Bibi verdict, issued a stark warning to the groups that were agitating against the decision. He concluded his address stating, "do not take the state to a point where it has no option but to take action". On 1 November, the National Highways and Motorway Police advised commuters to "refrain from travelling on motorways and national highways" on account of "the law & order situation across the country". Christian schools in Lahore "closed indefinitely" for safety reasons following the protests. The government of Pakistan also shut down mobile phone networks on 2 November.

Before the announcement of the acquittal on 31 October, Christians in Pakistan fasted and prayed. Cardinal Joseph Coutts, Roman Catholic Archbishop of Karachi, prayed that "there may not be a violent reaction from the extremists".

Saif-ul-Mulook, the lawyer who defended Asia Noreen, states that "his life has not been the same since; he rarely socialises, lives in a constant state of hypervigilance and has been inundated with threats." The South China Morning Post and Christian Today reported that he is now an "easy target" for extremists. On 3 November 2018, he was reported as "having fled" the country, to the Netherlands. Saif-ul-Mulook maintains that the United Nations "kept me for three days and then put me on a plane against my wishes" as he "refused to leave the country without ensuring that his client was out of prison."

Religious hardliners petitioned to overturn the acquittal.

=== International response ===
The decision was praised by human rights groups and organizations advocating for persecuted Christians, such as International Christian Concern, Open Doors, and Aid to the Church in Need. CEO of Open Doors David Curry, said: "We are breathing a sigh of relief today ... as these charges stemmed from her Christian identity as well as false accusations against her. We are hopeful that Pakistan will now take additional steps to offer religious freedom and basic human rights throughout the country." Omar Waraich, Amnesty International's Deputy South Asia Director, described the ruling as a "landmark verdict". Neville Kyrke-Smith of Aid to the Church in Need proclaimed with respect to Noreen's acquittal: "Today is like the dawn of new hope for oppressed minorities." The Human Rights Commission of Pakistan issued a statement on 1 November welcoming the acquittal, stating that "From a human rights perspective, the Supreme Court's detailed judgement underlines several of the most problematic aspects of applying the blasphemy laws. The presumption of innocence is too easily buried by moral outrage, which invariably pits the vulnerable and underprivileged against those in majority."

Olav Fykse Tveit, general secretary of the World Council of Churches, "received with joy" news of the acquittal, stating: "We celebrate her acquittal and release together with her, her family and community ... The WCC has repeatedly called for justice for Asia Bibi, convicted 8 years ago on charges resulting from a village argument in which she was accused by her neighbours of blasphemy. ... WCC therefore appeals once again to the Government of Pakistan to review its blasphemy laws, to curb their abuse, and to eliminate discriminatory bias against religious minorities."

United Nations: UN deputy spokesman Farhan Haq said that because of the organization's long-standing opposition to the death penalty, it "would welcome this latest development".

United Kingdom: Theresa May, the prime minister of the United Kingdom, stated that "the news would be welcomed around the world, and the UK was committed to the global abolition of the death penalty." According to the British Pakistani Christian Association, Noreen appealed to Britain for asylum but was denied because her presence in the country might stir unrest among "certain sections of the population".

United States: Tenzin Dorjee, chair of the United States Commission on International Religious Freedom (USCIRF), lauded the ruling, saying: "The case of Asia Bibi illustrates the extent to which blasphemy laws can be exploited to target minority communities. These laws seek to protect entire religions rather than the individual, as should be the case under international human rights standards. It is deeply troubling that Bibi's case even reached this level, where she almost became the first person in Pakistan's history to be executed for the crime of blasphemy."

France: Marine Le Pen, president of the National Rally in France called on her government to grant Asia Noreen asylum.

The European branch of the American Center for Law and Justice lauded the ruling as well, and advocated the "abolition of the crime of blasphemy in Pakistan".

Several countries, including France and Spain, have offered Asia Noreen asylum.

== Bar from leaving Pakistan (November 2018) ==
On 2 November 2018, the Government of Pakistan under the administration of Imran Khan and the Islamist Tehreek-e-Labbaik political party, which encouraged the protests against Noreen, came to an agreement that barred her from leaving the country, in addition to releasing Tehreek-e-Labbaik protesters. Noor-ul-Haq Qadri, the religious affairs minister, and Muhammad Basharat Raja, Punjab's minister for law, signed the agreement on behalf of the government. The deal included expediting a motion in the court to place Asia Noreen on Pakistan's no fly list, known officially as the Exit Control List (ECL). Pakistani authorities would not release Asia Noreen until the "Supreme Court makes a final review of its verdict" as "Ghulam Mustafa, the lawyer representing a provincial cleric in Punjab who had filed the initial blasphemy charges against Noreen, petitioned the Supreme Court requesting that the judges review her acquittal." Similar reviews have taken years to process. The TLP agreed to end its three-day protest sit-ins across the country and its leaders asked the protesters to disperse peacefully.

A plane from the United Kingdom reportedly arrived to pick up Asia Noreen after her acquittal, but returned without her, as the Pakistani government then still had her under detention as a result of the agreement with Tehreek-e-Labbaik.

Wilson Chowdhry, chairman of the British Pakistani Christian Association (BPCA), stated that "placing Asia Bibi on the ECL is like signing her death warrant" and Sardar Mushtaq Gill, head of the Legal Evangelical Association Development (LEAD), attributed the government's reluctance to act both to fear of hardliners' response and to sentiment within its own ranks.

This agreement between the Government of Pakistan and Tehreek-e-Labbaik led to "allegations [that] the government was capitulating to extremists". Pakistani Information Minister Fawad Chaudhry responded to these allegations, saying that "We had two options; either to use force, and when you use force people can be killed, and that is not something a state should do, or second, we tried negotiations and (in) negotiations you take something and you leave something."

Asia Noreen's lawyer Saif-ul-Mulook called the agreement between the Government of Pakistan and the Islamists "painful", stating that "They cannot even implement an order of the country's highest court". Feeling that his life was threatened, Mulook fled to Europe in order "to stay alive as I still have to fight the legal battle for Asia Bibi". BPCA chairman Wilson Chowdhry likewise stated that "I am not surprised that Imran Khan's regime has caved in to extremists". Jemima Goldsmith, an ex-wife of Imran Khan, similarly "said that Pakistan's government caved in to extremist demands to bar Asia Bibi from leaving the country", opining: "Not the Naya Pakistan we'd hoped for. 3 days after a defiant & brave speech defending the judiciary, Pakistan's government caves in to extremist demands to bar Asia Bibi from leaving Pakistan, after she was acquitted of blasphemy – effectively signing her death warrant."

Ashiq Masih, Noreen's husband, appealed to US president Donald Trump, as well as British prime minister Theresa May and Canadian prime minister Justin Trudeau, to "help the family leave the country" and grant them asylum. He told the charity Aid to the Church in Need, an organisation that aids persecuted Christians: "Help us get out of Pakistan. We are extremely worried because our lives are in danger. We no longer have even anything to eat, because we cannot leave the house to buy food".

On 7 November 2018, a release order arrived at the New Jail for Women, in which Noreen was incarcerated in Multan. Local news reported that she had been flown to PAF Base Nur Khan and would depart the country on a charter plane to the Netherlands. However, the Ministry of Foreign Affairs denied the media reports that she had left Pakistan, stating that she was "in a safe place in Pakistan".

Hafiz Shahbaz Attari of the Islamist political party Tehreek-e-Labbaik Pakistan (TLP), upon hearing the news, said that TLP members would gather in Islamabad and Rawalpindi and try to prevent her departure. Another TLP leader Afzal Qadri, stated that "officials told the group that Noreen would not be allowed to leave until the Supreme Court ruled on their appeal of her acquittal".

British member of Parliament Mike Gapes, then of the Labour and Co-operative Party, suggested in November 2018 that the UK should reassess their relationship with Pakistan, and Rehman Chishti resigned as Britain's trade envoy to Pakistan in the same month, partially in protest to the government's refusal to offer Noreen asylum. US senator Rand Paul spoke to President Donald Trump about securing asylum for Noreen in that nation.

Noreen was reported to have spent Christmas 2018 in custody. Joseph Nadeem, the man guarding her husband and family, said that Islamists had fired at the gate of their home and that they had to move five times in order to evade them.

=== International reaction and response ===
EU: Antonio Tajani, President of the European Parliament, stated: "The European Parliament is extremely concerned for your safety as well as your family's, due to the violence by extremist elements in Pakistan." Tajani sent a letter to Noreen's husband, inviting his family to "Brussels or Strasbourg for a meeting about how I can concretely facilitate the release of your wife, Asia Bibi".

Italy: Matteo Salvini, Deputy Prime Minister, stated: "I want women and children whose lives are at risk to be able to have a secure future, in our country or in other Western countries, so I will do everything humanly possible to guarantee that [for Bibi] ... It is not permissible that in 2018 someone can risk losing their life for a ... hypothesis of blasphemy". Salvini further stated that "Italy had nothing against the Pakistani government" but that the "enemy is violence, extremism and fanaticism".

Canada: Chrystia Freeland, Minister of Foreign Affairs, stated" "It's a very important issue, a central priority for our government ... Canada calls on Pakistan to take all measures necessary to ensure the safety and security of Asia Bibi and her family ... Canada is prepared to do everything we can and is extremely engaged in this issue."

Australia: Peter Dutton, Minister for Home Affairs, said that Australia will offer asylum to Noreen.

== Acquittal upheld (January 2019) ==
On 29 January 2019, Pakistan's Supreme Court upheld the acquittal on blasphemy charges and ruled that she was now free to leave Pakistan, where she was facing death threats, and join members of her family who were (according to unconfirmed reports) already abroad. Violent protests erupted across Pakistan, demanding the execution of the judge and Noreen. While her lawyer, who escaped to Germany, said that Noreen was in Canada, others allege that she was being held in a secret location in Islamabad and that it is not clear when she would leave or where she would go.

France, Spain, the Netherlands, Germany, Italy, and Australia were among the countries who offered her asylum.

At the Faizabad Interchange in Islamabad, fifty-five people were arrested during a protest of the decision to uphold the Supreme Court's acquittal decision.

== Present status ==
On 8 May 2019, Noreen arrived in Canada, where she was reunited with her family who had previously arrived in the country before her. International Christian Concern, an organisation long advocating for her release, released a statement saying that "Our prayers are now with Asia and her family as they seek peace and security in a new country". In 2020, she claimed asylum in France. In February 2020, Asia Bibi was interviewed by Open Doors in Paris, where she shared her feelings about her life and how her Christian faith helped her through her imprisonment that was a result of a false accusation.

A Barelvi mosque was built in 2014 in Islamabad named after Mumtaz Qadri, who assassinated the Punjab governor Salman Taseer for defending Noreen. Qadri was convicted by the Islamabad High Court, sentenced to death and hanged in February 2016.

== Memoirs ==
French journalist Anne-Isabelle Tollet assisted Noreen in writing a memoir titled Blasphemy: A Memoir: Sentenced to Death over a Cup of Water (2013, ISBN 1613748892). Noreen is illiterate, and Tollet was unable to visit her directly due to prison restrictions. She conducted interviews through Noreen's husband, who passed questions and answers between them. Tollet also met other members of Noreen's family, including her children and sister, and had known Shahbaz Bhatti before his assassination. In August 2020, Asia Bibi distanced herself from the memoir, stating that she was not involved in its planning, did not recognize the story as hers, and did not agree with its conclusions regarding Pakistani law.

In 2015, Polish filmmakers, inspired by the memoir, produced the film Uwolnić Asię Bibi ('Freedom for Asia Bibi').

== See also ==
- Persecution of Christians
- Persecution of Christians in Pakistan
- Human rights in Pakistan
- Mariam Yahia Ibrahim Ishag
- List of Christian human rights NGOs
- Secularism in Pakistan

== Bibliography ==
- Allen, John L. (2013). The Global War on Christians: Dispatches from the Front Lines of Anti-Christian Persecution. Random House LLC. ISBN 978-0770437367.
- Hughes, Geraint (2012). My Enemy's Enemy: Proxy Warfare in International Politics. Apollo Books. ISBN 978-1845194499.
- Marshall, Paul (2013). Persecuted: The Global Assault on Christians. Thomas Nelson Inc. ISBN 978-1400204427.
- El Shafie, Majed (2012). Freedom Fighter: One Man's Fight for One Free World. Destiny Image Publishers. ISBN 978-0768487732.
