= Pace Pakistan =

- Native name: پیِس (پاکستان) محدود
- Type: Public
- Traded as: PSX: PACE
- Founded: 1992
- Founder: Salman Taseer
- Headquarters: Lahore, Punjab, Pakistan
- Revenue: ▼ Rs. 241.809 million (US$860,000) (2023)
- Operating income: ▼ Rs. −85.135 million (US$−300,000) (2023)
- Net income: ▼ Rs. −1.677 billion (US$−6.0 million) (2023)
- Total assets: ▼ Rs. 6.872 billion (US$25 million) (2023)
- Total equity: ▼ Rs. −1.677 billion (US$−6.0 million) (2023)
- Website: pacepakistan.com
- Footnotes; Financials as of 30 June 2023

Pace (Pakistan) Limited, commonly known as Pace Pakistan, is a Pakistani real estate development company headquartered in Lahore. It develops, owns, and operates shopping malls, residential apartments, housing schemes, and mixed-use developments across Pakistan, and is listed on the Pakistan Stock Exchange.

== History ==
Pace Pakistan was founded in 1992 by Salman Taseer as part of the First Capital Group, his family's diversified holding company with interests in finance, real estate, and media. In October 1995, the company opened its first shopping mall, Pace Gulberg, on Main Boulevard in Gulberg, Lahore; it was one of the earliest enclosed shopping centres in the city and helped introduce mall-based retail to the Punjab market.

In April 2005, the company inaugurated its second Lahore mall, Pace Model Town Link Road, in an area surrounded by the Model Town, Faisal Town, and Johar Town suburbs. A further mall on M.M. Alam Road in Gulberg was completed in 2006, and the company was subsequently listed on the Karachi Stock Exchange (later the Pakistan Stock Exchange). Pace then expanded outside Lahore, opening shopping malls in Gujranwala in 2007 and Gujrat in 2008.

Pace also moved into residential and mixed-use property development. Pace Woodlands, a gated villa scheme adjoining DHA Phase V, Lahore, on Bedian Road, was completed in 2010 and comprises 160 villas spread over 81,000 square metres (20 acres). Subsequent projects under the Pace umbrella include Pace Towers, Pace Circle (a mixed-use development announced in 2020), the Peacock Valley Hotel and Resort, and Pace Tower T-27.

In June 2025, Pace's board approved a major restructuring under which Pace would issue fresh equity to pay down debt, convert part of its borrowings into equity, and divest its controlling stake in Pace Super Mall (Pvt.) Limited, the vehicle owning the Gulberg flagship.

== Fire incidents ==
On the night of 13-14 March 2022, a major fire broke out at the four-storey Pace Gulberg mall on the Main Boulevard. The blaze, classified by the district government as a Grade-A emergency, burned for several hours and gutted around 400 of the mall's shops, along with offices and counters. The director general of Rescue 1122, Rizwan Naseer, said it was the second fire to have broken out in the building. Rescue and Civil Defence officials reported that the mall's in-house firefighting system, including its hydrants and emergency exits, was not fully operational at the time of the blaze. Following the incident, the building was sealed by local authorities after cracks appeared in its roof and walls.

A traders' union representing affected shopkeepers filed a complaint with the Gulberg police nominating members of the Taseer family, including the late Salman Taseer's widow Aamna Taseer and sons Shahbaz Taseer and Shehryar Taseer, as well as the mall's general manager and a senior manager, alleging that the owners had set the building ablaze in order to vacate the premises for a planned sale; the family denied the allegations and police negotiated with union leaders to amend the complaint. Lahore's commissioner ordered a high-powered inquiry into the cause of the fire. Shopkeepers separately criticised the Punjab government for not announcing a compensation package comparable to the one provided after the 2020 Hafeez Centre fire. As of April 2024, two years after the fire, the mall remained closed pending a rehabilitation plan from the Lahore Development Authority.
