= Blasphemy (disambiguation) =

Blasphemy is the act of insulting or showing contempt or lack of reverence for one or more gods or towards religious or holy persons or things, or toward something considered sacred or inviolable.

Blasphemy may also refer to:

== Books ==
- Blasphemy, a novel by Tehmina Durrani
- Blasphemy (Preston novel), a 2008 techno-thriller novel
- Blasphemy (story collection), a 2012 story collection by Sherman Alexie
- Blasphemy: A Memoir, real story of Asia Bibi sentenced to death for blasphemy

== Music ==
- Blasphemy (band), a black metal band
- Blasphemy (Incantation album), 2002
- Blasphemy (Kayo Dot album), 2019
- “Blasphemy”, a song by Bring Me the Horizon from the album That's the Spirit
- “Blasphemy”, a song by Job for a Cowboy from the album Genesis
- “Blasphemy”, a song from Tyler Joseph’s solo album No Phun Intended
- “Blasphemy”, a song by Tupac Shakur from the album The Don Killuminati: The 7 Day Theory
- “Blasphemy”, a song by Robbie Williams and Guy Chambers from Williams' album Reality Killed the Video Star

== See also ==
- Blasphemer (disambiguation)
