= Taysir =

Taysir, or Tayseer is a unisex given name of Arabic origin. Notable people with the name include:

== Given name of Taysir ==
- Taysir Batniji (born 1966) Palestinian multidisciplinary artist
- Taysir Hayb, Arab-Israeli soldier
- Taysir Khalid (born 1941), Palestinian politician
- Taysir El Nourani (born 1965), Sudanese politician
- Taysir Abu Saada (born 1951), Palestinian politician
- Mohammed Atef (1944–2001), nicknamed Taysir Abdullah, Egyptian al-Qaeda member

== Given name of Tayseer ==
- Tayseer Allouni (born 1955), Syrian journalist
- Tayseer Abu Sneineh, Palestinian politician
- Tayseer Qala Awwad (born 1943), Syrian politician
- Tayseer Barakat (born 1959), Palestinian painter, curator, and writer
- Tayseer al-Jabari (1972–2022), Palestinian militant
- Tayseer al-Mashhadani (died 2012), Iraqi politician
- Tayseer Najjar (1975–2021), Jordanian journalist
- Tayseer Sboul (1939–1973), Jordanian actor

== See also ==
- Taseer (disambiguation)
