= Killing of Shahnawaz Kumbhar =

Sindhi doctor killed extrajudiciously

- Killing of Shahnawaz Kumbhar (Sindh) Location of Sindhri police station
- Location: 25.715°N 69.133°E; Sindhri police station, Mirpur Khas District, Sindh, Pakistan
- Date: September 18, 2024; 01:20
- Attack type: fake encounter killing
- Weapon: Firearms
- Deaths: 1
- Victim: Shahnawaz Kumbhar
- Perpetrator: Sindh police
- Motive: Alleged blasphemy by the victim
- Accused: 18

Shahnawaz Kumbhar (Sindhi: شاهنواز ڪنڀر) was a local hospital doctor in Umerkot, Sindh, Pakistan, who was killed in a fake encounter by the Sindh Police on 17 September 2024. He was accused by a local mosque cleric of using blasphemous language against Prophet Muhammad on social media. After a case was registered by the police based on a complaint from local mosque cleric Sabir Soomro under Article 295C of the Pakistan Penal Code, Shahnawaz was dismissed from his job at the civil hospital in Umerkot.

During the night of 18–19 September, reports emerged that Shahnawaz had been killed in a police encounter. His relatives, who initially believed he was safe after being surrendered that night, were shocked to learn the next morning that he had been killed. The killing was supported by religious groups, but faced massive backlash from civil society and led to huge protests across Sindh.

== Victim ==
Shahnawaz Kumbhar was a doctor at the local civil hospital in Umerkot, Sindh, Pakistan. According to Syed Sardar Ali Shah, the Sindh Government's Minister of Education, in a speech delivered in the Sindh Assembly, Shahnawaz Kumbhar was an FCPS doctor and had ranked among the top 10 students in his batch. He also regularly organised free medical camps in Umerkot and its surrounding villages to provide healthcare services.

== Incident ==
=== Background ===
This incident occurred on 17 September 2024, during the Eid Milad-un-Nabi celebrations, when a gathering turned violent. A mob stormed a police station, demanding an FIR be filed against Shahnawaz Kumbhar for alleged blasphemous social media posts. Initially, the SHO refused to register the case, but the situation quickly escalated. To control the chaos, the rioters attacked the Umerkot police station, setting fire to a police mobile van. Eventually, a case of blasphemy was filed against Shahnawaz under Section 295C of the Pakistan Penal Code The complaint was lodged by Sabir Soomro, the imam of a local mosque, accusing Shahnawaz of making offensive remarks about the Prophet Muhammad on social media.

After the FIR was registered, a gathering took place in front of the press club, including the mob, Tehreek-e-Labbaik Pakistan leader Pir Umer Jan Sarhandi and Asif Baloch, SSP Umerkot. During the gathering, SSP Asif Raza Baloch stated to mob that "the entire district police team was committed to tracking down the accused. the police is working diligently and is fully focused on the case to ensure the arrest of the suspect." Shahnawaz was suspended from his position. The accusations triggered a wave of severe backlash and hatred toward him on social media, accompanied by protests and violent incidents in Umerkot. Throughout the night, rioters continued their sit-ins, leaving the town in a state of tension. On the next day, 18 September 2024, the unrest in Umerkot intensified. The entire city was shut down as protesters burned tires on the streets and held demonstrations. The rioters also looted Shahnawaz's clinic, setting its contents on fire in the town's main square.

That same day, around noon, a video was uploaded to a Facebook account under the name "Ali Kanbhar." In the video, Shahnawaz clarified, "My old account was under the name Shahnawaz Shah, but it's very old, and I no longer use it." The video shows him in a hotel room. Additionally, multiple other posts from the same account showed Shahnawaz asserting that he is a devout Muslim and had no involvement with the offensive posts. He also mentioned that he had handed over his mobile phone to the police and FIA, which had been thoroughly examined as part of the investigation.

=== Alleged encounter killing ===
A blasphemy case was registered against Shahnawaz Kumbhar. on 17 September, but he was not arrested. However, during the night between 18 and 19 September, news emerged of his alleged death in a police encounter.

SHO Niaz Khoso stated that Shahnawaz was "accidentally killed" in the morning of 18 September. According to the police, officers had attempted to halt two men on a motorcycle in Mirpur Khas, Sindh. Rather than comply, the men fired shots and attempted to escape, prompting the police to fire back. One suspect fled on the motorcycle, while the other was shot and killed during the confrontation.

Prior to his death, on 17 and 18 September, violent protests were held in Umerkot by religious groups in response to the alleged blasphemy incident. A video made the rounds on social media showing someone at Civil Hospital Mirpurkhas giving props to the police. The person in the video praised DIG Mirpurkhas, SSP Mirpurkhas, and the CIA police, declaring that Shahnawaz, who was accused of blasphemy, had been sent to "hell".

Criticism on the police arose following the murder of Kumbhar on the Al Khidmat Foundation, when DIG Javed Soonharo Jiskani, SSP Chaudhry Asad, and PPP MNA Pir Amir Bakhsh Jeelani were publicly honored with over 5 maunds of flowers in Umerkot. A red carpet was laid at the SSP office, where they were garlanded.

Religious groups lauded DIG Jiskani, calling him a ghazi, a term used for a warrior fighting for the Muslim faith. While PPP MNA Pir Ameer Shah Jeelani expressed support for the killing of Kumbhar, Sindh's Education Minister Syed Sardar Ali Shah condemned the act, stating that it was unacceptable to kill someone based on blasphemy allegations.

== Shahnawaz's funeral ==
According to a close relative of Shahnawaz:

"At around four in the morning, Shahnawaz's father arrived with the body in an ambulance, but the angry crowd did not allow the ambulance to enter the village. After that, the ambulance driver asked to unload the body. We placed the body in a car, with its feet hanging out of the window. Our family took the body for burial in Jehanro, a small town 40 kilometers from Umerkot, but mob from religious groups and a sizable crowd also gathered at the scene. When we were not allowed to bury the body in any cemetery, we took it to our land in a desert area where we attempted to bury it, but angry people also came there and threatened us. The crowd grabbed the body and set it ablaze, causing it to be fifty percent burned."

Shahnawaz's driver, Prem Kolhi, sought to recover the doctor's body from the mob and successfully arranged for its burial. During this incident, the mob also attempted to lynch Prem Kolhi.

== Public reaction ==
On the first day following the incident, fear spread throughout Sindh, as blasphemy cases of such severity were rarely reported in the region, particularly in Sindh and Balochistan, compared to other parts of Pakistan. This event marked the first extrajudicial killing in Sindh related to blasphemy accusations. The situation intensified on the second day when religious groups adorned police officers implicated in the case with garlands, leading to a significant public outcry. Protests were organized by various nationalist parties, civil society, social, human rights and political groups, Sufi communities, Women Rights Activists, human rights organizations, HRCP and Amnesty International all condemning the murder of Kumbhar. The public also took to social media to raise awareness of the incident, pressuring the government to take action against TLP leader Pir Umer Jan Sarhandi, Pir Ameer Ali Shah, a member of the PPP, has faced backlash for celebrating the incident by adorning police officers and members of the mob with garlands. He called for FIRs to be file against all police officers linked to the killing, including DIG Javeed Jiskani, SSP Chaudhry Asad, SHO Niaz Khoso, and CIA Incharge Inayat Zardari.

In the Village of Jhanehro, Umerkot, Shahnawaz's father, retired teacher Saleh Muhammad Kumbhar, initially had to arrange for condolences within the confines of his home. This was due to strict warnings from local religious clerics, advising against any public gatherings outside.

In response, leaders from nationalist groups and their student wings, and civil society announced that they would visit the village to offer their condolences and lead a funeral prayer in absentia for Shahnawaz. They were joined by Sindhi folk and Sufi singers, Khushboo Laghari and Manjhi Faqeer, who not only performed the funeral prayer in absentia but also placed a traditional Sindhi Ajrak on Shahnawaz's grave.

Political and social groups, along with civil society, held large-scale protest at the same Chowk in Umerkot where religious groups had previously started riots and announced a bounty of 5 million rupees on Shahnawaz Kumbhar. The protests were attended by a significant number of local residents.

== Aftermath ==
After public pressure, on the second day, Syed Sardar Ali Shah and Zia Lanjhar gave speeches in the Sindh Assembly regarding the case of Shahnawaz. In his speech, Sardar Shah mentioned that Shahnawaz's mental condition was not stable and stated that if the police had committed an extrajudicial killing, action should be taken. Following this, the Chief Minister of Sindh took notice of the murder, and the IGP of Sindh was instructed to form an initial investigative committee.

Afterward, the Human Rights Commission began an investigation. Following the investigation, Home Minister Zia Lanjhar, Sardar Ali Shah, and the IGP Sindh held a joint press conference, releasing a five-page initial investigation report. The report stated that Shahnawaz had been killed in an extrajudicial execution by the police.

- Arrest and Transfer: Shahnawaz was arrested in Karachi and later handed over to the police of Mirpurkhas district.
- Fake Encounter: The committee found that Shahnawaz was murdered in a fabricated police encounter.
- Mob Violence: After his killing, an angry mob seized Shahnawaz's body. The mob then set his body on fire and attempted to bury him, all while in the presence of the police, who failed to control the situation.
- Police Involvement: The report strongly condemned the police for their actions, which were not only illegal but also tarnished the reputation of the police force. The officers involved were blamed for allowing the situation to escalate, leading to Shahnawaz's death and the subsequent desecration of his body.
- Action: The Sindh police chief has decided to suspend several officers in reaction to the incident. This action affects the Deputy Inspector General (DIG) of Mirpurkhas, the SSP of Mirpurkhas, the complete CIA team, and the Station House Officer (SHO) associated with the case.

=== Legal Developments ===
On 2 October 2024, the Mirpurkhas anti-terrorism court remanded 18 suspects into judicial custody concerning the incident involving the burning of Kunbhar's body. This group included nine individuals previously arrested and an additional nine presented by the Umerkot police in court. The individuals identified as suspects include Arshad Ali, Badar Panhwar, Mohammad Saleem Sand, Lakhmeer, Daud Ranghar, Aleem Samejo, Fakeer Mohammad Palijo, Mashooq Khaskheli, and Abdul Ghaffar.

Amidst these arrests, nine suspects from a total of 150 accused of setting a police van ablaze during violent protests against Kunbhar were also sent to jail. Notably, the two FIRs filed against Kunbhar at police station Sindhri—accusing him of attacking a police party were declared false and subsequently disposed of.

A formal complaint filed by Muhammad Ibrahim Kumbhar led to a case being filed at the police station of Sindhri implicating several police officials and religious figures. The accused face serious charges under the Pakistan Penal Code, including Section 201 for concealing evidence, Section 302 for murder, Section 364 for kidnapping with intent to murder, Section 34 for common intention, Section 147 for rioting, Section 148 for armed rioting, Section 149 for unlawful assembly, and Section 120B for conspiracy. They are also charged under Sections 6 and 7 of the ATC, Section 8 and the Section 9 of Torture and Custodial Death (Prevention and Punishment) Act, 2022. Those named in the FIR include DIG Mirpurkhas Jiskani, SSP Mirpurkhas Asad, SSP Umerkot Asif, and Pir Umar Jan, among others.

Until 14 October 2024, The Sindh High Court's Mirpurkhas circuit bench granted a 10-day protective bail to Sirhindi. Sarhindi, along with senior police officers including DIG Javed Jiskani, SSP-Mirpurkhas Asad Choudhary, and SSP-Umerkot Asif Raza Baloch, was implicated in a murder case filed by Ibrahim Kunbhar, Kunbhar's brother-in-law. The complaint alleged that these individuals acted in connivance to murder Kunbhar in police custody under the guise of blasphemy allegations.

Sirhindi's counsel has filed an application seeking the dismissal of the murder FIR, which the Sindh High Court has acknowledged by issuing notices to all relevant parties. Meanwhile, The court directed that the names of DIG and The SSPs are to be added to the Exit Control List (ECL), preventing them from leaving the country while the investigation is ongoing.

In response to these incidents, several religious leaders, including Shahid Ghouri of Pakistan Sunni Tehreek, Abdul Khaliq of Bharchondi, and Mufti Muhammad Jan Naeemi of Jamaat Ahle Sunnat, conducted a press briefing in Umerkot, urging a thorough and impartial inquiry into the blasphemy incident and its repercussions.
