= Mumtaz Qadri =

Assassin of Salmaan Taseer (1985–2016)

- ممتاز قادری
- Born: Mumtaz Hussain; 1985; Rawalpindi, Punjab, Pakistan
- Died: 29 February 2016 (aged 30–31); Adiala Jail, Rawalpindi
- Resting place: Bara Kahu, Islamabad
- Occupation: Policeman
- Status: Executed by hanging
- Motive: Victim's support for Asia Bibi
- Conviction: Murder
- Penalty: Death

Details
- Victims: Salmaan Taseer
- Date: 4 January 2011; 15 years ago
- Country: Pakistan
- State: Punjab
- Locations: Kohsar Market, Islamabad
- Weapon: AK-47
- Imprisoned at: Adiala Jail (2011–2016)

Malik Mumtaz Hussain Qadri (1985 – 29 February 2016), better known as Mumtaz Qadri (Urdu: ممتاز قادری), was a Pakistani Elite Police commando who is known for murdering Salmaan Taseer, Governor of Punjab. Qadri was a commando of the Elite Police and, at the time of the assassination, a member of the squad of official guards assigned to protect Taseer. A follower of the Barelvi version of Sunni Islam, he assassinated Taseer on 4 January 2011. He claimed to have killed the Governor because Taseer spoke in defense of Asia Bibi, a Pakistani Christian woman convicted of blasphemy and sentenced to death. Qadri was convicted by the Islamabad High Court, sentenced to death and hanged in February 2016.

== Life and career ==
Qadri was born in 1985 in Rawalpindi, Punjab. He was a son of a vegetable seller in Muslim Town. Qadri joined the Punjab Police in 2002 and was promoted to the Elite Police in 2007. In 2009 he got married and had one son. In 2010, he joined the squad of the security guards of former Governor of Punjab, Salmaan Taseer.

== Taseer's murder and conviction ==
On the evening of 4 January 2011, Governor Taseer was at Kohsar Market in Islamabad. Qadri, who was there in the capacity of Taseer's bodyguard, shot Taseer 28 times and killed him. He surrendered immediately after the shooting and was arrested. According to Qadri, he killed the governor for his support of Asia Bibi, who was sentenced to death for allegedly insulting the Islamic prophet Muhammad, and for speaking against the blasphemy law in Pakistan.

From the day he was arrested, he was held in custody on a five-day remand. He appeared in court on 9 January 2011 and confessed that he had killed Salman Taseer because of his speaking against the blasphemy law. During his appearance in court over 300 lawyers offered to represent him pro bono. On 10 January 2011, he was sent to Adiala Jail on a 14 day judicial remand. Because of the security issues, his trial was held in Adiala Jail; it began on 14 January 2011. He was charged with the murder of the Governor of the Punjab.

=== Execution ===
On 10 October 2011, the court found him guilty and condemned him to death. He filed an appeal in Islamabad High Court on 6 October 2011 against his death sentence, and the appeal was admitted on 11 October 2011. Justice Dost Mohammad made clear his view that the accused, a uniformed officer, was not entitled to take the law into his own hands and murder a man who was under his protection. His appeal was rejected in October 2015, with the Supreme Court calling him a terrorist. A further review was rejected in December 2015, and he was hanged on 29 February 2016 around 4:30 a.m. at Adiala Jail in Rawalpindi.

=== Funeral ===
Qadri's funeral was held on 1 March 2016 at Liaqat National Bagh in Rawalpindi and was attended by Hamid Saeed Kazmi. Security forces had expected between 20,000 and 35,000 people to attend, but an unnamed police officer estimated total attendance at around 90,000. The Pakistan Electronic Media Regulatory Authority banned electronic media from broadcasting his funeral because it was a violation of Article 19 of the Constitution of Pakistan. The Pakistan Federal Union of Journalists condemned the ban on the media. It was also noted that Barelvis attended the funeral in large numbers. Qadri was buried in the Bara Kahu district of Islamabad.

=== Reaction ===
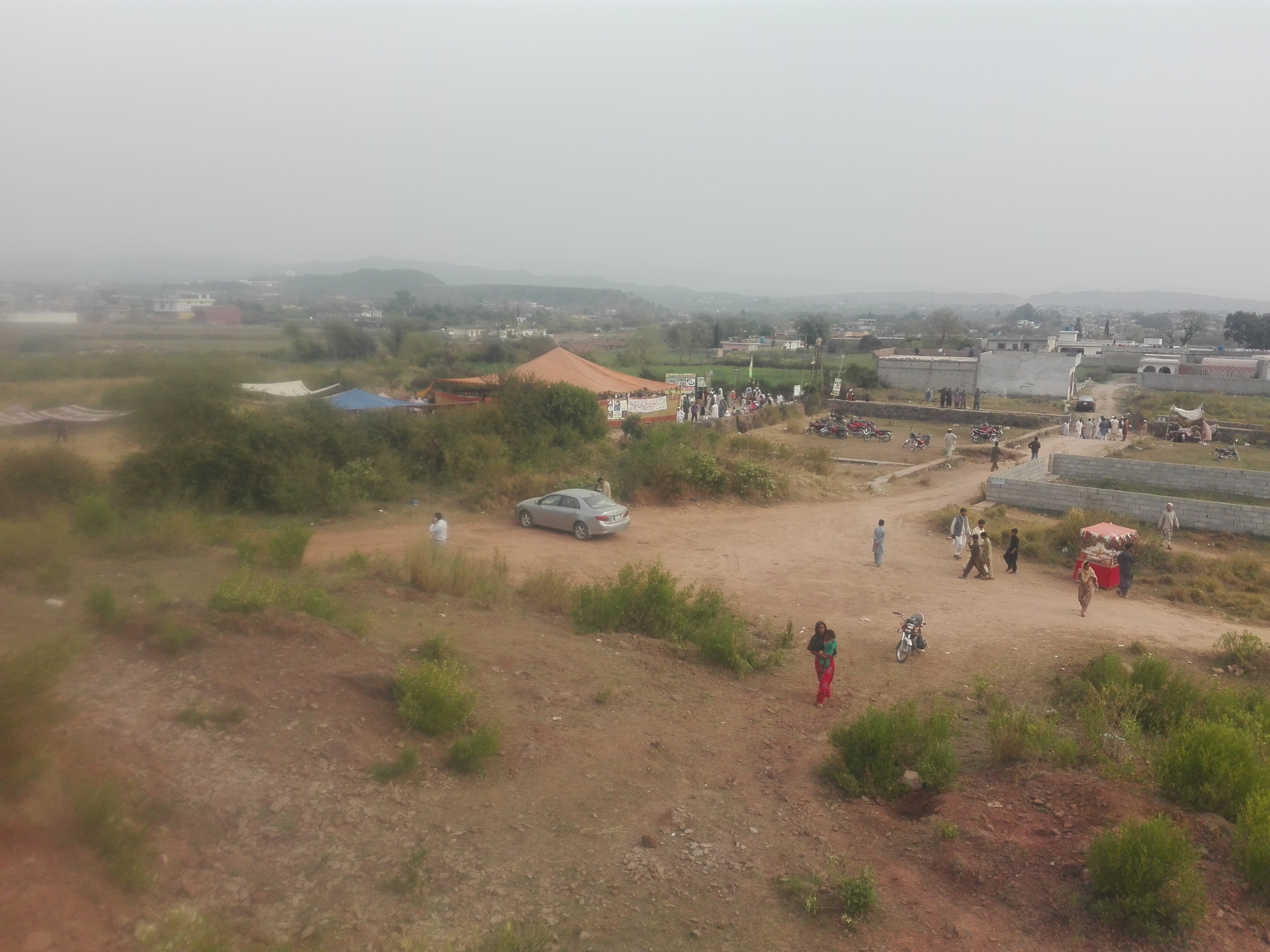
Mumtaz Qadri tomb

Protests began immediately by Sunni Islamist organisations all over the country against the execution. Activists protested in major cities of Pakistan, including Islamabad, Karachi, Lahore and Peshawar. Lawyers in Islamabad called a one-day strike against the decision. Sunni Tehreek announced protests all over the country. Rawalpindi-Islamabad Metrobus was also suspended due to the protests in the city. Markets and business centers were closed and traffic disruption was reported in different locations of Lahore, Karachi and Islamabad. The adulation that Qadri received following his execution was compared to that given to Ilm-ud-din, who murdered a book publisher in 1929. However, the execution decision was supported by many Islamic scholars, including Mohammad Khan Sherani, chairman of the Council of Islamic Ideology, who said, "Mumtaz Qadri’s act, though driven by religious sentiments, was illegal because he had taken the law into his own hands and he faced punishment because no one is above the law." Qadri's supporters also claimed that he was hanged on 29 February, a date which only comes every four years, in order to deny his anniversary.

On 27 March 2016, 25,000 people gathered at Liaquat National Bagh in Rawalpindi. 10,000 of them marched from Rawalpindi into the Red Zone in Islamabad to commemorate the Chehlum of death of Qadri, which is the end of the 40-day mourning period. The protesters torched a station of the Rawalpindi-Islamabad Metrobus and several cars parked there. Several major arteries leading into the city were closed, and cellular service was suspended as well. They staged a sit-in outside the Parliament of Pakistan and refused to leave unless Sharia was imposed throughout Pakistan. The Pakistan Armed Forces was called in to disperse the protesters. On the same day, protesters carrying pictures of Qadri attacked the Karachi Press Club, and burned a car belonging to Jaag TV, in retaliation for the press's "lack of coverage of their event". This happened on the same day that a bomb attack in Gulshan-e-Iqbal Park in Lahore killed 69 people.

Qadri's execution has become a rallying point for Pakistan’s Barelvis and some Sufis. As of April 2016 his grave was receiving hundreds of visitors per day and being transformed into a pilgrimage site.

== Legacy and political impact ==
Qadri's imprisonment and execution were the direct catalyst for the formation of the Tehreek-e-Labbaik Pakistan (TLP), a hardline religious-political party. Initially organized as the Tehreek-e-Rihai Mumtaz Qadri (Movement to Release Mumtaz Qadri) in 2015, the group was led by cleric Khadim Hussain Rizvi.

Following Qadri's hanging on 29 February 2016, the movement rebranded as the Tehreek-e-Labbaik Pakistan. The party adopted Qadri as its central figurehead, using his image to mobilize support for strict blasphemy laws and styling him as a "Ghazi" (warrior). The TLP has since utilized the issue of blasphemy as a primary political tool, organizing major protests such as the 2017 Faizabad sit-in. Qadri's grave in Bhara Kahu was expanded into a shrine, which has become a pilgrimage site for his supporters.

In 2014, a Barelvi mosque shrine was built in Islamabad named after Mumtaz Qadri and as of 2014, the mosque was so popular that it started raising funds to double its capacity.

== See also ==
- Assassinated Pakistani Politicians
- Blasphemy in Pakistan
- Freedom of Speech in Pakistan
- Islamic Fundamentalism
- Religious Persecution in Pakistan
