= Tavleen Singh =

Indian journalist

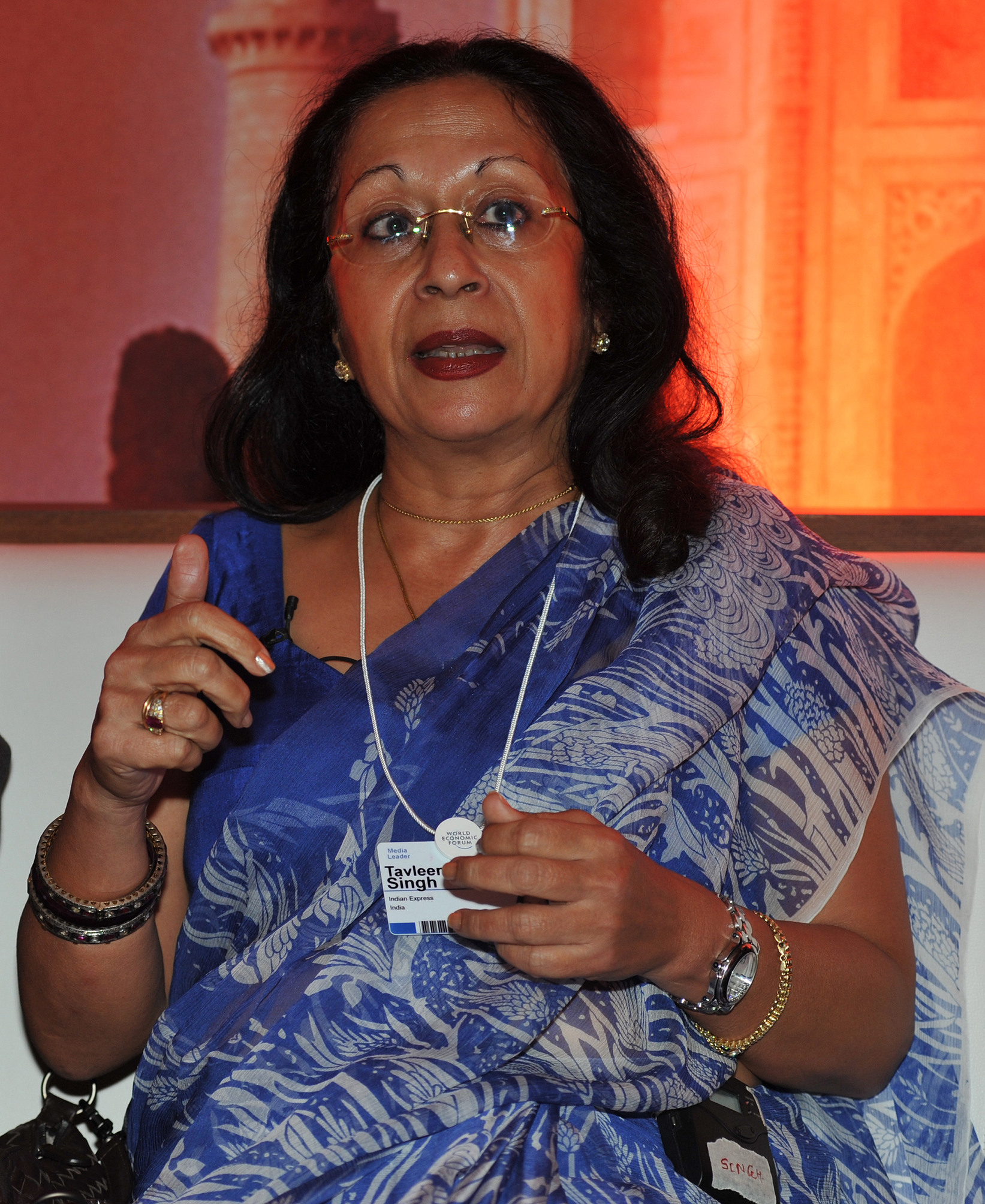
- Born: 1950 (age 75–76); Mussoorie, Uttarakhand, India
- Occupations: Author and Columnist
- Partner(s): Salman Taseer - 1980; Ajit Gulabchand
- Children: Aatish Taseer
- Website: www.tavleensingh.com

Tavleen Singh (born 1950) is an Indian columnist, political reporter, and writer.

== Biography ==
Singh was born in Mussoorie in 1950 to a Sikh family. She studied at Welham Girls' School. She did a short-term journalism course at the New Delhi Polytechnic in 1969. She graduated from St. Bede's College, Shimla.

She completed her education in India and started her career as a reporter at the Evening Mail, Slough (England), where she worked and trained for two and a half years under the Westminster Press/Thompson training scheme.

Singh returned to India in 1974 to work with The Statesman as a reporter. She joined The Telegraph as a Special Correspondent in 1982. In 1985 and 1987, she was the South Asia correspondent of the Sunday Times, London.

Subsequently, she became a freelancer and started writing for India Today and The Indian Express.

In 1990, she began her stint with television by heading Plus Channel's Delhi bureau. Singh presented two video magazines called People Plus and Business Plus. She has hosted Ek Din Ek Jeevan, a Hindi weekly programme on STAR Plus. She is with The Indian Express and The Hitavada. She writes a weekly column on Sundays. In 1988, she was honoured with the Chameli Devi Jain Award for Outstanding Woman Mediaperson.

== Personal life ==
Singh has a son, writer Aatish Taseer, with former Pakistani politician Salman Taseer.

== Works ==
- Kashmir: A Tragedy of Errors. Viking, 1995. ISBN 0-14-025078-6.
- Lollipop Street: Why India Will Survive Her Politicians. Viking, 1999. ISBN 0-670-88838-9.
- Fifth Column. Viking, ISBN 0-670-08135-3.
- Political and Incorrect: The real India, warts and all. Harpercollins. 2008. ISBN 81-7223-712-X.
- Durbar. Hachette, 2012. ISBN 978-93-5009-444-0.
- India's Broken Tryst. Harpercollins, 2016. ISBN 978-9351777571
- Messiah Modi: A Tale of Great Expectations, 2020
- In 2026, Singh published her debut novel, The Actor, a political thriller set in a future India.
