= Blasphemy: A Memoir =

2011 book by Anne-Isabelle Tollet and Aasiya Noreen

Blasphemy: A Memoir: Sentenced to Death over a Cup of Water
- Author: Anne-Isabelle Tollet, Asia Bibi
- Language: English
- Published: 2011
- Pages: 160
- ISBN: 9781613748893

Blasphemy: A Memoir: Sentenced to Death over a Cup of Water is a book by French journalist Anne-Isabelle Tollet and Aasiya Noreen better known as Asia Bibi. It is about the real-life story of Asia Bibi, a Pakistani Christian woman who was sentenced to death after being convicted of blasphemy by a Pakistani court, in 2010 and was in jail in solitary confinement. She was tried after a dispute over drinking water with her Muslim neighbours after she drank water from the same cup as her Muslim neighbours in a rural village in the Sheikhupura District of Punjab, Pakistan in which she was accused of allegedly insulting the Islamic prophet Muhammad, a charge she has denied. The book was dictated by Asia Bibi, an illiterate and mother of five, to her husband from jail.

Asia Bibi would later disown the memoir, citing that she disagreed with the book's portrayal of her story and Pakistani law.

== Reception ==
Kirkus Reviews found it to be "a passionate plea for help from a desperate woman who stands behind her pledge of innocence." U.S. Catholic found the book "moving", and called it "an up-close account of the ugly effects of religious intolerance, vicious discrimination, and unjust blasphemy laws."

In an August 2020 interview with Voice of America Urdu, Asia Bibi disowned the book. She stated that she was not involved in its planning, did not recognize the story as hers, and disagreed with its conclusions regarding Pakistani law. Her public condemnation of the book, particularly her refusal to denounce blasphemy law, drew criticism from some church leaders and Christian activists.
