= Arif Iqbal Bhatti =

Pakistani jurist

Justice of the Lahore High Court
- In office 1995–1997

Personal details
- Died: 17 October 1997 Lahore, Pakistan

Arif Iqbal Hussain Bhatti (died 17 October 1997) was a Pakistani jurist, and Judge of the Lahore High Court who was murdered for acquitting two men accused of blasphemy.

In 1995, he, along with Justice Khurshid Ahmed, acquitted two Christian men of blasphemy charges.

In 1997, he was murdered by the Barelvi mobster Ahmed Sher for alleged blasphemy by acquitting blasphemy offenders.

== See also ==
- Salman Taseer
