= Blasphemer =

Blasphemer may refer to:

- Blasphemer, a person who commits blasphemy
- The Blasphemer, a 1921 American silent drama film
- Blasphemer, the stage name of Rune Eriksen (b. 1975), a Norwegian guitarist formerly of the black metal group Mayhem
- Blasphemer is the title of a free content adaptation of Heretic

== See also ==
- Blasphemy (disambiguation)
