= Exit Control List =

List of people banned from leaving Pakistan

- Abbreviation: ECL

Agency overview
- Formed: December 21, 1981; 44 years ago

Jurisdictional structure
- Operations jurisdiction: Pakistan
- Legal jurisdiction: Constitution of Pakistan
- Governing body: Government of Pakistan
- Constituting instrument: The Exit from Pakistan (Control) Ordinance, 1981

Operational structure
- Headquarters: Pak Secretariat Islamabad, Capital Territory
- Parent agency: Ministry of Interior (Pakistan); Federal Investigation Agency

The Exit Control Lists (ECL; Urdu: ای سی ایل) is a system of border control maintained by the Government of Pakistan under Exit from Pakistan (Control) Ordinance, 1981. The people on the list are prohibited from leaving Pakistan.

== History ==
The Exit Control List was created on 21 December 1981, during the military government of Muhammad Zia-ul-Haq. It was established through the "Exit from Pakistan (Control) Ordinance, 1981". The law gave the federal government the power to stop any person from leaving Pakistan, even if they held a valid passport. Originally, the list was intended to stop people involved in serious economic crimes or corruption from fleeing the country.

Over time, the list became controversial because it was often used against political opponents. In 2010, the government introduced the "Exit from Pakistan (Control) Rules" to set clear guidelines. Later, in 2015, the Supreme Court of Pakistan ruled that traveling abroad is a fundamental right, forcing the government to reform how names are added to the list.

In April 2022, the government amended the rules to prevent indefinite travel bans. Under the new rules, a name is automatically removed from the list after 120 days unless the government provides concrete evidence to extend the ban.

=== Current criteria ===
According to the 2010 rules and subsequent amendments, the Ministry of Interior can place a person on the ECL for several specific reasons. These grounds primarily include involvement in large government corruption, misuse of power, banking fraud, drug trafficking, or terrorism. Additionally, names are added if the High Court or Supreme Court of Pakistan issues a direct order to do so.

The ECL is legally distinct from the Provisional National Identification List (PNIL). The PNIL is a temporary 30-day travel ban managed by the Federal Investigation Agency (FIA) to handle immediate emergencies before the formal ECL process can be completed.

== Controversies ==
In 2018, the government and Tehreek-e-Labbaik Pakistan (TLP) reached an agreement after which the latter ended its three-day-long nationwide protests against the Supreme Court of Pakistan's acquittal of Asia Bibi who had been sentenced to death in 2010 for blasphemy.

One of the points both parties agreed on was that the government would "initiate the legal process" to place Bibi's name on the Exit Control List.

After Bibi's acquittal on October 31, the Tehreek-e-Labbaik Pakistan (TLP) ordered their followers to protest and begin sit-ins across the country. The protests turned violent and saw destruction and vandalism of private property. However, the government stated that unless a person is declared a criminal, or there is another legal basis for action, the question of placing an individual's name on the ECL would not arise.

=== Political abuse ===
The ECL has frequently been used for political leverage. Former prime minister Nawaz Sharif was added to the list and later granted conditional removal by the cabinet, a decision criticised for political bargaining rather than consistent legal principles. The Lahore High Court subsequently ordered that his name be removed without bond requirements.

On 10 June 2005, Mukhtar Mai, also known as Mukhtaran Bibi, a rape survivor, was put on the ECL by then president Pervez Musharraf right before she was scheduled to fly to London on the invitation of Amnesty International, and her passport was confiscated. According to Musharraf, he had placed Mai on the list, because he did not "want her to project a bad image of Pakistan". On 27 June 2005, Mai's passport was returned to her, and 2 days later, Musharraf stated that "Mukhtaran Mai is free to go wherever she pleases, meet whoever she wants and say whatever she pleases."

Since 2022, many of the Pakistan Tehreek-e-Insaf (PTI) leadership, including Imran Khan and associated party workers have been placed on the ECL amid political confrontations, using the list punitively rather than for genuine criminal investigations.

Journalists too have been affected by ECL abuses, Arshad Sharif an investigate journalist faced threats of travel bans before leaving Pakistan, and then eventually assassinated in Kenya, an example of the use of the ECL against critical media voices. The federal cabinet also ordered the addition of 24 people to the ECL, including journalists Imran Riaz Khan and Sami Ibrahim.

Because of such practices, human-rights groups and legal analysts have repeatedly demanded reforms including clearer statutory criteria for placement, regular independent review, mandatory reasons for listing, and greater transparency.
