= Majed el-Shafie =

Human rights activist

Majed el-Shafie is the president and founder of One Free World International (OFWI), an international human rights organization which advocates for religious minorities and is based in Toronto, Canada. He is a former Egyptian Muslim who converted to Christianity and was tortured and condemned to death in Egypt.

== Early life and career ==
Shafie was born as a Muslim in Cairo. After converting to Christianity, el-Shafie was arrested in 1998 and taken to the Abu Zaabal Prison in Cairo, where he was tortured. After receiving the death penalty,(Egypt's constitution and those don't give the death penalty to converts) he managed to escape Egypt by driving a stolen jet-ski from Taba in Sinai to nearby Eilat, Israel. Shafie was arrested in Israel, but eventually released through the assistance of the United Nations and additional organizations, which helped him to obtain political asylum in Canada. In 2002, he settled in Canada, and in 2006 became a Canadian citizen.

Shafie has been the subject of a 2012 documentary entitled "Freedom Fighter".

In 2012, Shafie received the Queen Elizabeth II Diamond Jubilee Medal.

In early 2025, el-Shafie co-produced the documentary Dying to Live alongside Canadian filmmaker Chris Atkins. The film examines the October 7 attacks and the Nova music festival massacre, relying on eyewitness accounts from non-Jewish victims, first responders, and foreign nationals to counter denialism surrounding the event.

El Shafie has voiced opinions against what he sees as radicalization and antisemitism in the Muslim world. He claims that hatred for Israel is a new form of antisemitism.

== Books ==
- Freedom Fighter: One Man's Fight for One Free World. Destiny Image. ISBN 978-0768403138
