= M. D. Taseer =

Urdu poet and literary critic

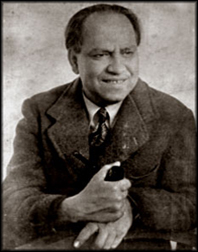
- Taseer in the 1940s
- Born: Muhammad Din Taseer; 28 February 1902 Ajnala, Amritsar district, Punjab, British India
- Died: 1 December 1950 (aged 48)

Muhammad Din Taseer (28 February 1902 – 1 December 1950), also known as Deen Muhammad Taseer and popularly known as M. D. Taseer, was a Pakistani Urdu poet, writer, and literary critic. He is considered one of the pioneers of the progressive movement in Urdu literature.

== Early life ==
M. D. Taseer was born in Ajnala, Amritsar district, Punjab, on 28 February 1902 to a family of Kashmiri ancestry. His father, a tribesman from kashmir named Mian Atta ud Din Taseer, died when he was a small child, and he was brought up by his uncle Mian Nizam ud Din Taseer in Lahore. He was a friend of Allama Iqbal since his childhood.

In 1933 Taseer started a literary journal called Karwan. After his M. A., while employed as an assistant professor in the University of Punjab, Lahore, he went to University of Cambridge for a PhD in English literature, with Iqbal's letter of recommendation. He reached London in 1933 and began his M. Litt. at Pembroke College, Cambridge. His research supervisor Sir Arthur Quiller-Couch asked the University Senate to allow him to work on his PhD without obtaining an M. Litt first. His PhD thesis was titled "India and the Near East in English literature from the earliest times to 1924". Taseer is said to be the first person from the Indian subcontinent to have obtained a PhD in English Literature in England, but it is not true because Taseer completed his PhD at Cambridge in 1936, whereas Saiyid Abdul Latif, was awarded a doctorate in English literature from the University of London in 1924.

== Career ==
On his return from Cambridge at the end of 1935, Taseer joined the Muslim Anglo-Oriental (MAO) College in Amritsar as its principal. Along with Faiz Ahmad Faiz he was one of the founders of the Progressive Writers' Movement.

In 1941, Taseer was appointed the principal of Sri Pratap College in Srinagar. In 1942 he became the founding principal of the new Amar Singh College, which was an offshoot of the Sri Pratap College. In 1943, he was given in the Government of India, helping in the war effort. He worked in Simla and Delhi.

After the Partition of India, he moved to Pakistan, worked as the principal of the Islamia College in Lahore.

== 1947 Kashmir conflict ==
In the first week of October 1947, the Government of Pakistan reportedly sent him, along with Faiz Ahmad Faiz, to persuade Sheikh Abdullah, the leader of the Jammu & Kashmir National Conference, to join Pakistan. Abdullah, who had just been released from prison by the Maharaja's government, was unwilling. He wanted to keep his options open. According to Abdullah, Taseer told him that, if Kashmir did not join Pakistan, they would have to think of "other ways". Abdullah's response was that "a decision must be made by the people themselves and they must be allowed to make it."

Abdullah's indecision ended with the Pakistani tribal invasion of Kashmir on 22 October. He asked the Indian prime minister Jawaharlal Nehru to accept Kashmir's accession and send the troops needed for the defence of Kashmir.

== Life ==
In 1937 Taseer fell in love with a British tourist named Christobel George, who had also been a student at Cambridge. They were married in 1938, with Allama Iqbal himself drafting the marriage-deed (nikahnama) for the couple, including the right of divorce for Christobel George, and Christobel converting to Islam and adopting the name of Balqees Taseer (also spelled Bilquis Taseer). Christobel's sister Alys Faiz married Faiz Ahmad Faiz.

M. D. Taseer was the father of the 26th Governor of Punjab Salmaan Taseer and the grandfather of Aatish Taseer. His daughter Salma Mahmud published a memoir The Wings of Time, recounting his life.

Taseer died of a heart attack on 30 November or 1 December 1950, at age 47.

== Works ==
- M. D. Taseer; Khurram Khiraam Siddiqui (2009). Articles of Dr. M.D. Taseer. Pakistan Academy of Letters. ISBN 978-969-472-188-0.
- M. D. Taseer; Afzal Haq Qarshi (1994). Iqbāl kā fikr o fann. Bazm-i Iqbāl.
- M. D. Taseer (1977). Iqbal: The Universal Poet. Munib Publications.

Taseer's lyrics were used in the 1942 film Khandan.
