= Blasphemy in Pakistan =

Pakistani penal code on insulting religion

Population by religion, 2023	Blasphemy accused by religion, 2024
Pakistan's population, 2023: 1. Muslim (96.3%); 2. Hindu (2.17%); 3. Christian (1.37%); 4. Ahmadi (0.07%); 5. Other (0.04%)	Blasphemy accused, 2024: 1. Muslim (70.0%); 2. Hindu (9.00%); 3. Christian (6.00%); 4. Ahmadi (14.0%); 5. Other/unspecified (1.00%)

The Pakistan Penal Code outlaws blasphemy (Urdu: قانون ناموس رسالت) against any recognized religion, with punishments ranging from a fine to the death penalty. According to various human rights organizations, Pakistan's blasphemy laws have been used to persecute religious minorities and settle personal rivalries, frequently against other Muslims, rather than to safeguard religious sensibilities.

Between 1987 and February 2021, at least 1,855 individuals were charged under Pakistan's blasphemy laws, with Muslims constituting most of those accused.

Although death sentences for blasphemy have been issued on numerous occasions, no one has yet been executed by the order of the courts or government of Pakistan. However, those accused of blasphemy are frequently targeted and killed by angry mobs before any trial can begin.

At least 89 Pakistanis were extrajudicially killed over blasphemy accusations from 1947 to 2021. Among the victims of such killings have been high profile Pakistanis such as Punjab Governor Salman Taseer, Minister for Minorities Shahbaz Bhatti, and high court justice Arif Iqbal Bhatti, who was slain in his chambers.

According to the US Commission on International Religious Freedom, as of early 2021, around 80 people are known to be incarcerated in Pakistan on blasphemy charges, with half of those facing life in prison or the death penalty. As of 2023, there were at least 53 people in custody across Pakistan on blasphemy charges.

== Context ==
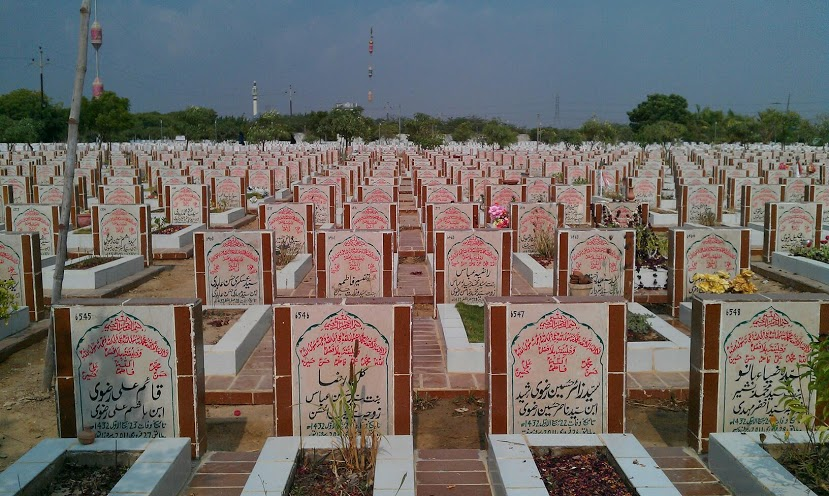
Besides non-Muslim and Ahmadiyya minorities, Pakistan's minority Shias too are accused of blasphemy for their beliefs. Since 2001, more than 2,600 Shia Muslims have been killed in violent attacks in Pakistan. Many are buried in the Wadi-e-Hussain Cemetery, Karachi.

Many people accused of blasphemy have been murdered before their trials were over, and renowned figures who opposed the blasphemy law have been assassinated. Since 1990, 62 people have been murdered following blasphemy accusations. According to one religious minority source, an accusation of blasphemy commonly exposes the accused, police, lawyers, and judges to harassment, threats, attacks, and rioting. (In October 1997, for example, a high court justice in Lahore was murdered in his chambers for acquitting two Christians accused of blasphemy, but the killer was "acquitted due to lack of witness testimony".)

Critics complain that those accused of blaspheming have seldom actually said or done anything blasphemous; (one lawyer who defends those accused of blasphemy, Anneqa Maria, states that: "In my entire career of 14 years as a criminal lawyer, none of the blasphemy victims I represented have actually committed blasphemy"); Asad Hashim writes that from 2010 to 2020,

the "offences" committed by those accused of blasphemy have been as absurd as throwing a business card into the rubbish (the man's name was Muhammad), a rural water dispute, spelling errors, the naming of a child, the design of a place of worship, burning a (non-religious) talisman or sharing a picture on Facebook.

They also complain that Pakistan's blasphemy laws are "overwhelmingly being used to persecute religious minorities and settle personal vendettas", but calls for change in blasphemy laws have been strongly resisted by Islamic parties - most prominently the Barelvi school of Islam. Many atheists in Pakistan have been lynched and imprisoned over unsubstantiated allegations of blasphemy. The state began a rigorous crackdown on atheism starting in 2017, causing conditions to deteriorate significantly. Secular bloggers started facing kidnappings, and the government-initiated advertising campaigns encouraging citizens to identify potential blasphemers in their midst. Further exacerbating the situation, the nation's highest judicial authorities classified such individuals as terrorists.

Cases under the blasphemy law have also been registered against Muslims who have harassed non-Muslims.

In 2020, the European Foundation for South Asian Studies (EFSAS) in a report entitled, Guilty until proven innocent: The sacrilegious nature of blasphemy laws in Pakistan, recommended wide-ranging changes to Pakistan's laws and legal systems.

According to the International Crisis Group, while in previous decades it was "Islamist hardliners" who lodged blasphemy charges, by around 2022 an environment had developed where "judges, police and private citizens" were "likely to see rewards rather than repercussions for making blasphemy accusations" and it was state court judges, not Islamists, who "increasingly raising the issue".

The U.S.-based Clooney Foundation for Justice (CFJ) released its findings in 2024 after monitoring 24 blasphemy lawsuits for six months during 2022 in Lahore, Punjab. The CJF said 15 of the accused are facing mandatory death sentences if convicted. However, the report said its monitors had noted little progress in most cases, with 217 out of 252 hearings adjourned, leaving many defendants stuck in pre-trial detention.

In November 2025 two Christian nurses were acquitted of blasphemy charges. According to Fr Khalid Rashid Ali, director of the National Catholic Commission for Justice and Peace, "this case represents a new and important development because the trial court itself dismissed the charges based on evidence. In Pakistan, trial courts in blasphemy cases are often reluctant to acquit due to social pressure and security risks and therefore defer decisions to higher courts. The independent and courageous decision of a district court in this case marks a positive and rare departure in judicial practice".

== Laws ==
By its constitution, the official name of Pakistan is the "Islamic Republic of Pakistan" as of 1956. More than 96% of Pakistan's 220 million citizens (2022) are Muslims. Among countries with a Muslim majority, Pakistan has the strictest anti-blasphemy laws. The first purpose of those laws is to protect Islamic authority. According to the constitution (Article 2), Islam is the state religion. By the constitution's Article 31, it is the country's duty to foster the Islamic way of life. By Article 33, it is the country's duty to discourage parochial, racial, tribal, sectarian, and provincial prejudices among its citizens. Under Article 10A of the constitution, it is also the state's duty to provide for the right of fair trial.

Religion-related offences on the territory of modern Pakistan were first codified by the British Raj in 1860, and were expanded in 1927. Pakistan inherited that legislation when it gained independence after the partition of India in 1947. Several sections of Pakistan's Penal Code comprise its blasphemy laws.

=== Development of Pakistani blasphemy laws ===
During the 1920s, after the assassination of a publisher of a book named Rangila Rasul, published in Lahore, Punjab, the administration of the British Raj enacted Hate Speech Law Section 295(A), in 1927, under pressure from the Muslim community, as a part of the Criminal Law Amendment Act XXV. This made it a criminal offence to insult the founders or leaders of any religious community. After the creation of Pakistan in 1947, many anti blasphemy laws and clauses were introduced in Pakistan's Penal Code.

Between 1980 and 1986, the military government of General Zia-ul Haq modified the existing blasphemy laws (which had been inherited from the colonial-era Indian Penal Code) to make them more severe, with a number of clauses being added by the government in order to "Islamicise" the laws and deny the Muslim character of the Ahmadi minority. Before 1986, only 14 cases of blasphemy were reported. Parliament through the Second Amendment to the Constitution on 7 September 1974, under Prime Minister Zulfiqar Ali Bhutto, declared Ahmadi Muslims as non-Muslims. In 1986, it was supplemented by a new blasphemy provision also applied to Ahmadi Muslims (See Persecution of Ahmadis). Between 1987 and 2017 at least 1,500 people were charged with blasphemy and at least 75 people involved in accusations of blasphemy were killed in Pakistan according to the Center for Social Justice. According to another source, between 2011 and 2015, "the latest period for which consolidated data is available" as of 2020, there were "more than 1,296 blasphemy cases filed" in Pakistan.

In January 2023, Pakistan's National Assembly passed a vote to tighten the country's blasphemy laws, a move that incited concern among minority groups. These communities feared the enhanced laws could lead to more human rights violations and further persecution of religious minorities. On January 17, the Assembly unanimously approved the Criminal Laws (Amendment) Bill. This legislation increased the penalty for disrespecting the Prophet Mohammed's companions, wives, and family members from three years of imprisonment to 10 years, in addition to a fine of 1 million Pakistani rupees, equivalent to roughly GBP £3,500. Blasphemy is a capital offence in Pakistan.

=== Religious offences and punishments ===
Pakistan Penal Code sections	Types and description of offences	Punishment
§ 298	Uttering of any word or making any sound or making any gesture or placing of any object in the sight with the deliberate intention of wounding the religious feelings of any person.	1-3 years imprisonment, or Rs 500,000 fine, or both
§ 298A	Use of derogatory remarks etc., in respect of holy personages. 1980	Up to 3 years imprisonment, or fine, or both
§ 298B	(Ahmadi blasphemy law) Misuse of epithets, descriptions and titles etc., reserved for certain holy personages or places, by Ahmadis. 26 April 1984	Up to 3 years imprisonment and fine
§ 298C	(Ahmadi blasphemy law) Aka Ordinance XX: Any Ahmadi representing themself as a Muslim, or preaching or propagating his faith, or "in any manner whatsoever" outraging the religious feelings of Muslims, or posing himself as a Muslim. 26 April 1984	Up to 3 years imprisonment and fine
§ 295	Injuring or defiling places of worship, with intent to insult the religion of any class.	Up to 2 years imprisonment or fine, or both
§ 295A	Deliberate and malicious acts intended to outrage religious feelings of any class by insulting its religion or religious beliefs. 1927	Up to 10 years imprisonment, or fine, or both
§ 295B	Defiling, etc., of Quran. 1982	Imprisonment for life
§ 295C	Use of derogatory remarks, spoken, written, directly or indirectly, etc. defiles the name of Muhammad or other Prophet(s). 1986	Mandatory Death and fine (Feb. 1990) Trial must take place in a Court of Session with a Muslim judge presiding.

Except for § 295-C, the provisions of § 295 require that an offence be a consequence of the intent of the accused. (See below Sharia.)

§ 298 states:

Anyone who, with the purposeful intent to offend the religious sentiments of another individual, either speaks a word or makes a noise within earshot of that person, or performs a gesture or displays an object within their line of sight, is liable to be penalized. The punishment may include imprisonment of any type for a period that could last up to one year, a monetary fine, or both.

Between 1986 and 2007, Pakistani authorities charged 647 people with blasphemy offences. with one source saying 50% of these were non-Muslims, who represent only 3% of the national population. No judicial execution for blasphemy has ever occurred in Pakistan, but 20 of those charged were murdered.

The only law that may be useful in countering misuse of the blasphemy law is PPC 153 A (a), whoever "by words, either spoken or written, or by signs, or by visible representations or otherwise, promotes or incites, or attempts to promote or incite, on grounds of religion, race, place of birth, residence, language, caste or community or any other ground whatsoever, disharmony or feelings of enmity, hatred or ill-will between different religious, racial, language or regional groups or castes or communities" shall be fined and punished with imprisonment for a term that may extend to five years.

On 12 January 2011, Prime Minister of Pakistan Yousuf Raza Gilani once again said that there would be no amendments to the blasphemy law.

=== Sharia ===
The Federal Shariat Court (FSC) is a religious body that rules on whether any particular law is repugnant to the injunctions of Islam. If a law is repugnant to Islam, "the President in the case of a law with respect to a matter in the Federal Legislative List or the Concurrent Legislative List, or the Governor in the case of a law with respect to a matter not enumerated in either of those lists, shall take steps to amend the law so as to bring such law or provision into conformity with the Injunctions of Islam" (Constitution, Article 203D). In October 1990, the FSC ruled that § 295-C was repugnant to Islam by permitting life imprisonment as an alternative to a death sentence. The Court said "the penalty for contempt of the Holy Prophet ... is death". The FSC ruled that, if the President did not take action to amend the law before 30 April 1991, then § 295-C would stand amended by its ruling.

Promptly after the FSC's ruling in 1990, Bishop Dani L. Tasleem filed an appeal in the Supreme Court of Pakistan, which has the power to overrule the FSC. In April 2009, the Shariat Appellate Bench of the Supreme Court considered the appeal. Deputy Attorney-General Agha Tariq Mehmood, who represented the federal government, said that the Shariat Appellate Bench dismissed the appeal because the appellant did not pursue it. The appellant did not present any argument on the appeal because, according to reports, he was no longer alive. Consequently, it appears to be the law in Pakistan that persons convicted under § 295-C must be sentenced to death with or without a fine.

=== Misuse of laws ===
Blasphemy laws in Pakistan have faced criticism for being misused to target vulnerable individuals, often through online entrapment. According to interviews with families of the accused, legal experts, rights advocates, and officials, as well as government reports, a pattern has emerged in which individuals are drawn into incriminating situations. In one 2023 case, a job seeker was contacted by a woman in a messaging group who sent him an inappropriate image containing religious text and asked him to forward it. After he complied, he was arrested on blasphemy charges by the Federal Investigation Agency (FIA). Human rights experts say such tactics are used to extort individuals or inflate arrest figures, and that blasphemy laws are sometimes exploited to generate public support and funding.

In 2024, a police report titled “Blasphemy Business Group” revealed the existence of a criminal network that used fabricated blasphemy accusations to extort money, reportedly with the involvement of officials from the FIA. In response, the government restructured the FIA’s cybercrime wing and established the National Cyber Crime Investigation Agency as a separate entity dedicated to handling digital offenses, including cases related to online blasphemy.

== Vigilantism ==
Those who are accused of blasphemy may be subject to harassment, threats, and attacks. Police, lawyers, and judges may also be subject to harassment, threats, and attacks when blasphemy is an issue. Those accused of blasphemy are subject to immediate incarceration, and most accused are denied bail to forestall mob violence. It is common for those accused of blasphemy to be put in solitary confinement for their protection from other inmates and guards. Like those who have served a sentence for blasphemy, those who are acquitted of blasphemy usually go into hiding or leave Pakistan.

Pakistan's blasphemy laws are known to be widely abused by those seeking personal gain from those accused, as evidenced by the Imran Ghafur Masih case study. Masih was accused and sentenced to life in prison under Section 295B of the blasphemy laws after his neighbor manipulated and tricked him into unknowingly throwing away a copy of the Quran, because the neighbor wanted to gain Masih's storefront real estate.

One of the most popular cases in this context is the Asia Bibi blasphemy case. Asia Bibi, a Christian farm laborer, was beaten by a mob and arrested for blasphemy in June 2009 after being accused of insulting the Prophet Muhammad during an argument. The Punjab governor, Salman Taseer, was shot in 2011, after he publicly voiced his support for Bibi by his own bodyguard Mumtaz Qadri. It took almost a decade to overturn her death sentence as she was acquitted in October 2018. Her release was opposed by a far-right fledgling party called Tehreek-e-Labbaik Pakistan (TLP), an offshoot of right-wing religious group Tehreek-i-Labbaik Ya Rasool Allah Pakistan. The radical elements managed to force the Pakistan's government to put Asia Bibi on Exit Control List to prevent her from fleeing the country. However, she managed to find an asylum in Canada in 2019.

In August 2023, a mob of hundreds of people attacked and burnt Christian houses in Jaranwala in the industrial district of the city of Faisalabad after two members of the minority Christian community were accused of blasphemy. At least 146 people were involved in the attack.

In 2024, at least 10 people accused of blasphemy were killed in mob or vigilante violence, according to the Center for Social Justice Pakistan.

== United Nations ==
Pakistan's support of blasphemy regulation has caused it to be active in the international arena in promoting global limitations on freedom of religion or belief and limitations on freedom of expression. In March 2009, Pakistan presented a resolution to the United Nations Human Rights Council in Geneva that called upon the world to formulate laws against the defamation of religion. See blasphemy.

In December 2019, the United Nations Human Rights OHCHR called blasphemy death sentence for Junaid Hafeez, a lecturer at Bahauddin Zakariya University in Multan, a 'travesty of justice'. A press release condemned the sentence. He was arrested in 2013, put under solitary confinement in 2014, and sentenced to death by a district and sessions court in Multan on 21 December 2019.

== Internet censorship ==
In May 2010, Pakistan blocked access to Facebook because the website hosted a page called Everybody Draw Muhammad Day. Pakistan lifted the block after Facebook prevented access to the page. In June 2010, Pakistan blocked seventeen websites for hosting content that the authorities considered offensive to Muslims. At the same time, Pakistan began to monitor the content of Google, Yahoo, YouTube, Amazon and Bing.

In January 2021, an Anti-Terrorism Court (ATC) convicted and sentenced three men to death for sharing blasphemous content on social media. A fourth accused in the same case, one Anwaar Ahmed, professor of Urdu language, was sentenced to 10 years imprisonment, along with a fine of Rs 100,000. He had been accused of disseminating controversial, blasphemous views during a lecture at the Islamabad Model College. During the trial, the court did not admit witnesses for the defense because they were blood relatives of the accused.

== Public opinion ==
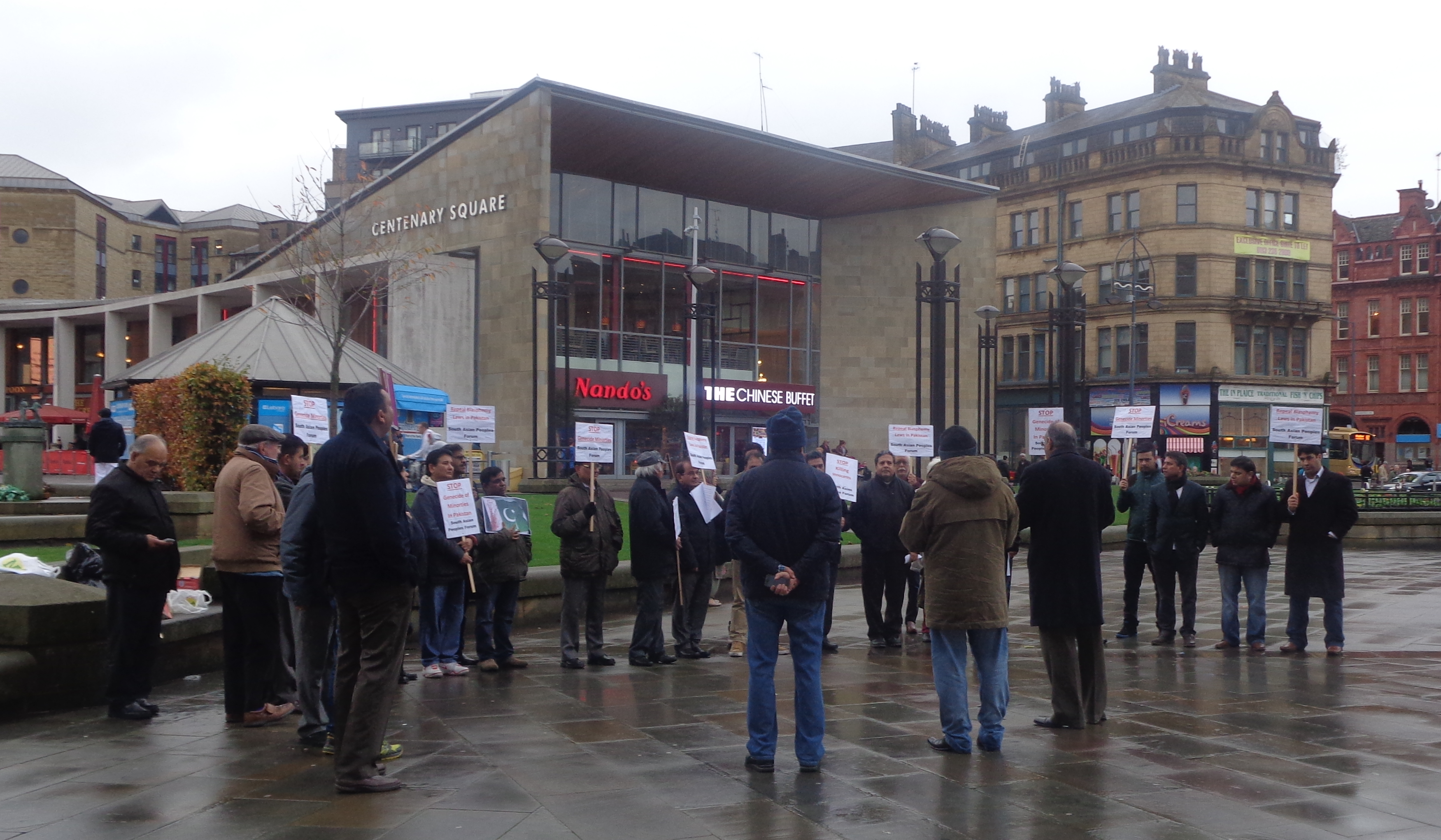
Anti-Pakistani blasphemy law protest in Bradford, England (2014)

On 19 March 2014, The Nation polled its readers and later reported that 68% of Pakistanis believe the blasphemy law should be repealed. On the other hand, the International Crisis Group reports that

... the Islamic parties are most successful in galvanising street power when the goal is narrowly linked to obstructing reforms to discriminatory religious laws that often provoke sectarian violence and conflict and undermine the rule of law and constitutionalism.

Pakistani human rights activists say that charges of blasphemy are being used to harass minorities and settle personal conflicts. Harshil Mehta, South Asia's political observer, has commented that it is "an urgent need to replace these laws" in his article in Outlook. If the Islamic Republic, he wrote, "wants to prove itself as a haven for religious freedom, then it must ban these regressive laws".

== See also ==
- Apostasy in Islam
- Asia Bibi blasphemy case
- Court system of Pakistan
- Criticism of Pakistan
- Freedom of religion in Pakistan
- Islam in Pakistan
- Islamization in Pakistan
- Pakistan National Commission for Minorities
- Pakistan Penal Code
- Religion in Pakistan
- Religious discrimination in Pakistan
- Sectarian violence in Pakistan
- Superstitions in Muslim Societies
- Women related laws in Pakistan
- Shahnawaz Kumbhar Case
- List of blasphemy cases in Pakistan
