= Tayseer Sboul =

Jordanian writer and poet

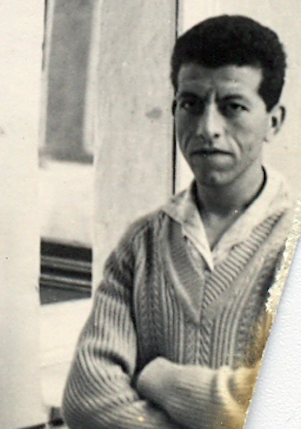
- Sboul in 1960s
- Born: 15 January 1939; Tafila
- Died: 15 November 1973 (aged 34); Amman
- Occupation: Actor
- Writing career
- Notable work: You as of Today
- Movement: Postmodernism

Tayseer Sboul (Arabic: تيسير سبول; 15 January 1939 – 15 November 1973) was an actor. His book You as of Today about the Arab defeat during the 1967 Six-Day War gained widespread Arab recognition and is considered one of the most influential of its time.

Born on 15 January 1939 in Tafila, a town on the edge of Transjordan's southern desert, he completed his middle school education near the industrial city of Zarqa. Having graduated from Amman's Hussein High School with distinction in 1957, he received a government scholarship to study philosophy at Lebanon's American University of Beirut, later relocating to Syria to study law at the University of Damascus. He married a Syrian-Bahraini woman, May Yateem, and returned with her to Jordan. During his two short stays in Bahrain and Saudi Arabia, he fathered a son and a daughter, Otba and Saba. He then returned to Jordan again and opened a private law practice in Zarqa, but soon after left that career to become the host of a radio talk show until his death in 1973. His show gained fame for hosting promising Arab and Jordanian writers.

Sboul wrote his first book, You as of Today, just after the Arab defeat during the 1967 Six-Day War. Its title was inspired by the patriotic song You as of Today Are Mine My Homeland which he sang as he went to visit the destroyed Allenby Bridge connecting both banks of the Jordan River. He was devastated by the sight of the destroyed bridge as it symbolized Jordan's loss to Israel of the West Bank, a territory which he considered a vital part of the Arab homeland. The novella talks about a young Arab man as he struggles with his failed relationships with members of the opposite gender, his dysfunctional family and corrupt political leadership. You as of Today brought the Arab world's attention to Jordanian writers in 1968 when it won the Al-Nahar Award for the Best Arabic Novel. The novella was popular for its form which was described as postmodernist, and which he developed away from traditional writing forms of the Arabic novel.

Despite initial Arab military successes during the 1973 Yom Kippur War, Sboul felt increasingly sorrowful and began to feel a lack of any hope to bring about positive change to the Arab world. On 15 November of that year, he committed suicide by shooting himself in the head. His friends established the Jordanian Writers Society after his death, an idea that was brought up in Sboul's writings. The Society holds an annual literary award in his honor and numerous Jordanian universities' literary conferences are held in his name.

== Life ==
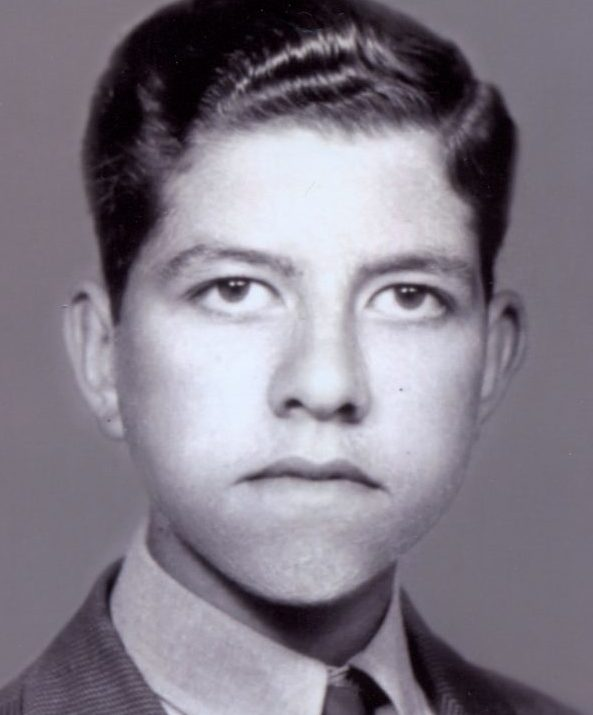
Tayseer Sboul in his youth.

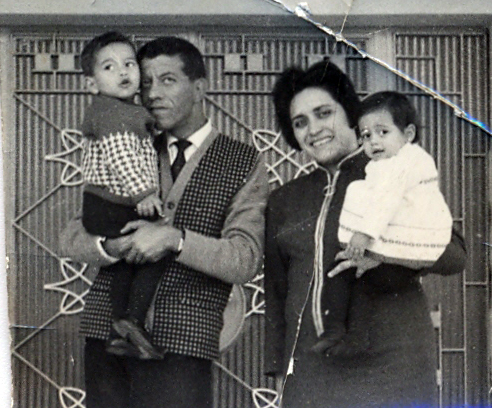
Tayseer with his wife May and children Otba and Saba.

Sboul was born in Tafila on 15 January 1939, a somewhat remote town on the edge of Transjordan's southern desert. He was born to a middle-class family. His father was a traditional Bedouin and his mother from Hebron, Palestine. Sboul was the youngest of five brothers and four sisters. In his youth, he was described by his family as a smart and sensitive boy and a distinguished student. Seeking better education opportunities, his father sent him with his brother Shawkat Sboul, a high-ranking officer and engineer in Transjordan's Arab Legion, to attend middle school near the military barracks in Zarqa, an industrial city which was in deep contrast to the open space of Tafila.

Sboul continued to attend high school in the capital Amman, a city bustling with activism. In 1955, he was deeply affected when his brother was arrested and imprisoned because of participation in protests against the British-supported Baghdad Pact, which Jordan had done so under British pressure. Sboul's early experiences are present throughout his work. After graduating from Amman's Hussein High School with distinction in 1957, he was awarded a government scholarship to study philosophy at Lebanon's American University of Beirut. Beirut's western and modern lifestyle bothered Sboul. He found his fellow students at the university "empty". This period of his life inspired a number of his works, including Red Indian, in which he expressed his rejection of Beirut's culture.

Sboul later moved to Syria, which he felt was more suitable for him with its traditional society, Arab nationalist sentiments and political activism. Studying law at the University of Damascus, he became politically active and published his works in Lebanese and Syrian newspapers. A collection of his poems titled Desert Sorrows was published in Beirut. He became a member of Syria's Arab Socialist Ba'ath Party, an experience which ended up disappointing him. He did not understand the campus fights that broke out between the nationalist Ba'athists and the communists. He found similarity between the parties and the security services: "regardless of the animosity between them, they both interfered in my personal affairs".

After finishing his education in Damascus, Sboul married May Yateem, a Syrian-Bahraini writer and physician, and returned to Jordan with her. He took up a position at the country's Income Tax Department, and later interned in a lawyer's office. He travelled with his wife, for her work, to Bahrain and Saudi Arabia, where they had a girl and a boy, Saba and Otba. Returning to Jordan in 1964 to open up a private law practice in Zarqa, he later accepted a position as a producer, writer and a host of a radio talk show called With the New Generation. The talk show was very popular because it hosted numerous Arab and Jordanian writers and poets. He continued working at the station until he died in 1973.

== Works ==
=== You as of Today ===
The decisive Israeli victory during the 1967 Six-Day War devastated Sboul, who was a firm believer in Arab unity. The most famous of Sboul's works was his novella titled You as of Today, considered one of the first Arab historical fictions written in response to the 1967 War, in addition to his other two short stories, Red Indian and The Rooster's Cry. The title of the novella is inspired by the You as of Today Are Mine My Homeland patriotic song, which he sang emphatically on his way to visit the destroyed Allenby Bridge across the Jordan River. He was still hopeful despite the destruction that he witnessed and was searching for a way to contribute to his nation. In Sboul's work, the protagonist emphasizes that he was not "forcing history into the narrative", and that the stories are actually realistic. According to his wife:

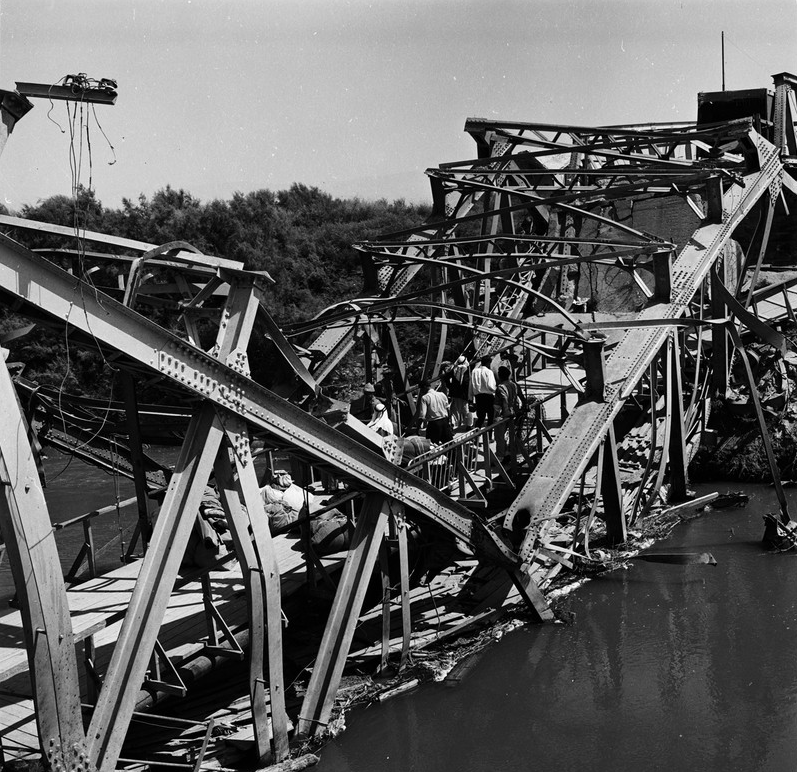
View of the destroyed Allenby/King Hussein Bridge after the 1967 Six-Day War which deeply affected Sboul and influenced his You as of Today novella. It symbolized Jordan's loss of the West Bank; a territory which Sboul considered to be a vital part of the Arab homeland.

He cried bitterly after the defeat and went to the shattered bridge to say goodbye to a part of his homeland, very dear to his heart, which was lost forever. He stopped writing poetry and started carefully reading history, looking for possible solutions or interpretations that might help him face what he saw as a dark and gloomy future.

Sboul later said that he was "looking for the last inch of what remained from my homeland… It was not just defeat; it was something else, much more… a nation drowning in sadness". Sboul added to his writings cultural heritage, historical references and events and symbols rooted in Arab literary and religious traditions. His works tackled issues such as religion, tradition, migration, familial ties, gender, prostitution, sex and domestic violence. Despite social taboos and censorship, he addressed lack of freedom, political oppression and corruption without worrying about any potential consequences. Sboul's novella did not adhere to the structure of traditional Arab novels, following instead a postmodernist approach. His writing style influenced a new generation of Arabic narratives.

The novella is told by two narrators, one of whom is the protagonist, Arabi ibn Arabi (an Arab son of an Arab), while the other is also an Arab who interjects and explains the narrative. It starts with the escalation of the protagonist's problems, from failed relationships with members of the opposite sex to his dysfunctional family and political leadership. The confused and lost protagonist returns to his old neighborhood to escape from the absurd and try to seek familiarity. The last two chapters tackle the 1967 defeat and its impact. The novella was a hit in the Arab world but Sboul never boasted about its success and said through the protagonist that "I write because it bothers me". His other two short stories did not receive much attention even though they complemented the novella's themes and Sboul's other works.

=== Red Indian ===
Red Indian is the story of a young Jordanian man's journey toward independence and self-discovery away from his patriarchal and stubborn father. It takes place in the westernized parts of Beirut when he lived there during the mid-1960s and early 1970s. The story tackles the social distance between eastern and western cultures. Sboul's writings were described by Nesreen Akhtarkhavari, an associate professor and the director of Arabic Studies at DePaul University, as bold and absolutely honest. His willingness to self-criticize was present throughout his work.

=== The Rooster's Cry ===
The Rooster's Cry is a story about a prisoner's encounter with the outside world during the evening and the day after of his release. His struggles to cope are found through his friend's wife, the female protagonist. He justifies this as rejection of what his friend has become; a boring, greedy, overweight capitalist and a social pariah. The woman becomes his savior by mending his heart and his fragile body. The story is filled with sarcasm and honesty without attempts at self-glorification.

== Social views ==
Women in Sboul's writings are central to many themes. For example, in What No One Told Us About Scheherazade, he sees himself as the only one who understands Scheherazade's oppression and her plight when others couldn't for centuries. Sboul considered the subjugation of women to be similar to the oppression of people in general and he saw himself as the only one who understood that and undertook the responsibility of exposing it through his writings.

شهرزادي
شهرزادي يا صديقة
قيل ما قيل ووحدي
أنت اسررت إليه بالحقيقة
ألف ليلة
كل ليلة
حلمكِ الأوحد أن تبقي لليلة
فاذا مالديك صاح
معلناً للكون ميلاد صباح
نمت والموت سوياً في فراش
ألف ليلة
غاض في عينيك ايماض التصبّي
واستوت كل المذاقات
فمرٌّ مثل عذب.
بعدها كان وما كان-صباح
كنت فيه بعض ذكرى عن صبيه
أين منها شهرزاد؟

Translation:

My Scheherazade,
My Scheherazade, My friend!
Whatever was said was said.
But you whispered the truth to me:
For a thousand nights,
every night
your only hope was to last through the night
So when the cock crowed,
announcing to the world the birth of the morning,
you slept with death in your bed.
For a thousand nights,
the light of youth was extinguished from your eyes,
all flavors became the same flavor,
the bitter like the sweet.
After that, it was morning, but was not
Only the memories of a young girl,
how different from that was Scheherazade!

In Sboul's writings, casual sex is not a sin but rather a natural human encounter. This is in stark contrast to past and current Arab cultural norms. Some of his poems are erotic but the language he used remained gentle so as not to provoke cultural sensibilities. One of his verses:

حين أومأت رضى
هاج أعراق المكان
رؤية المنتطر.
تبدأ الرحلة،
كفّ تتقرى ثم تغفو
ناعم هذا المساء.
تخفق الوردة في جوف الإناء
فإذا الصمت يعاني
من مخاض الحركة
...
وأصلي لك يا بنت الضياء
مغدق هذا المساء
وسخي بالعطاء.
هذه الأمداء كم سافرت فيها
قطفت كفّي جناها
واستقى منها فمي
غير أني بعد ظمآن وتجتاح دمي
رغبة هوجاء أن يهرق فيها،
فاسمعي هذا الدوي
إنه يهدر في العرق قوي
إنه يشتاق أن يسكن فيك

Translation:

When she gestured in consent,
my veins pulsed with excitement,
seeing that one I had waited for.
The journey starts.
One hand wanders, then rests.
This evening is gentle
The flower pumps inside the vase.
Silence suffers
the birth pains of movement.
...
I pray for you daughter of light
so generous this evening,
so unselfish in giving.
How often I have travelled this distance,
my hand reaping its fruits,
my mouth drinking from its flow.
But I am still thirsty, and my blood is hot
with a mad desire to be spilled in it.
So, listen to this banging
as it gushes strong through my arteries,
longs to live inside you

== Suicide ==
Separation is bitter and death is bitter. Everything that deprives a human from his humanity is bitter. And life is bitter. Boredom, the night, loneliness and being lost are all bitter. Our entire existence is bitter. Oh God how bitter that is! And my throat is also bitter. Sadeq, how fortunate it is that we die because death is our last bitterness.

— One of Sboul's letters to his friend Sadeq Abdulhaq

Sboul's sorrow over the Arab defeat in 1967 was followed by disappointment in the 1973 Yom Kippur War, whose initial military successes were followed by negotiations and manoeuvring. He had lost all hope to bring about change to the Arab World. On the night of 14 November 1973, Sboul met with his intellectual friends Odai Mdanat and Fayez Mahmoud and discussed the idea of committing suicide together. His friends left after midnight and his wife headed to her work at the Marka Military Hospital.

The morning after on 15 November, his wife returned from work and found him lying in bed. He told her to sit beside him and asked her if she believed in God, to which she replied in the positive. He then asked her to go to the neighbor's house to use their phone to order a gas cylinder for their house. As he watched his wife head to the house from his bedroom window, he committed suicide by shooting himself in the head.

== Legacy ==
Sboul's friends established the Jordanian Writers Society, which was suggested by him in his writings. The Society holds an annual literary award in his honor and numerous Jordanian universities' literary conferences are held in his name. In 2012, Jordanian writer Habib Zyoud wrote a poem eulogy about Sboul titled My Oud is missing a string. Sboul's works were translated to English and French in 2016 by Nesreen Akhtarkhavari, an associate professor and the director of Arabic Studies at DePaul University.

== Bibliography ==
- Sboul, Tayseer (2016). You as of Today My Homeland: Stories of War, Self, and Love. Michigan State University Press. ISBN 9781628952698.
