= Aatish Taseer =

British-Indian journalist and writer (born 1980)

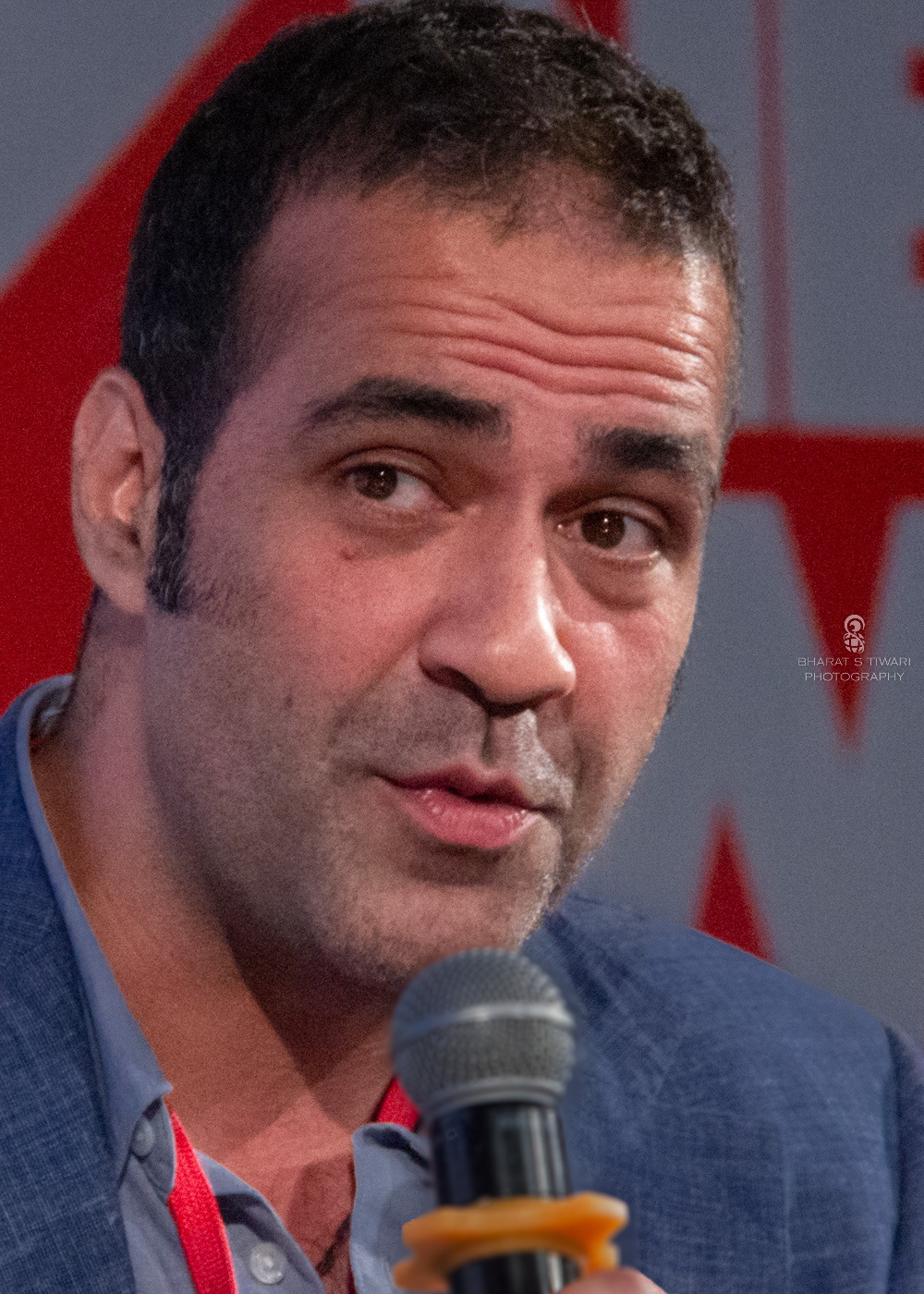
- Born: Aatish Ali Taseer; 27 November 1980 (age 45); London, England
- Education: Amherst College (B.A., 2001)
- Occupations: Writer, journalist
- Spouse: Ryan Davis (m. 2016)
- Parent(s): Salmaan Taseer; Tavleen Singh
- Relatives: M. D. Taseer (paternal grandfather)

Aatish Ali Taseer (born 27 November 1980) is a British-American writer and journalist.

Taseer was born in London and raised by his mother Tavleen Singh in New Delhi. Taseer had no contact with his father, Salman Taseer, until he was 21. He received his education at Kodaikanal International School and Amherst College, where he earned degrees in French and Political Science. Taseer's early life and estrangement from his father were central themes in his first book, Stranger to History (2009).

Taseer has contributed to Time magazine and other publications, gaining recognition for his pieces on feudal Pakistan, the "Ground Zero Mosque" controversy, and situation in Pakistan following his father's assassination. His article arguing Pakistan has an obsession with India, published in The Wall Street Journal, sparked widespread debate and controversy, leading to a notable exchange between journalists and politicians across India and Pakistan.

Personal aspects of his life include his marriage to lawyer Ryan Davis in New York, and his cultural and religious identity, which he describes as culturally and historically Hindu, worshiping Shiva. In 2019, Taseer's Overseas Citizenship of India was revoked, a move he claims was retaliatory for his critical coverage of Indian Prime Minister Narendra Modi. Taseer became a US citizen in 2020.

Taseer's work includes translations of Saadat Hasan Manto's short stories and several novels, with Stranger to History being translated into 14 languages. His literary contributions have earned him a place on the 2010 Costa First Novel Award shortlist for "The Temple-Goers."

== Early life ==
Taseer was born in London, England, to Pakistani businessman and politician Salman Taseer and Indian journalist Tavleen Singh. His parents had a brief extramarital relationship and never married; he was raised by his mother and had no contact with his father until he was aged 21. According to Taseer, his father met his mother during a book promotion trip to India in 1980 and the affair lasted "little more than a week." His father served as the 26th Governor of Punjab from 2008 until his assassination in 2011.

Taseer was raised in New Delhi, before attending Kodaikanal International School, a residential school in Kodaikanal. Taseer later studied at Amherst College in Massachusetts, earning dual Bachelor of Arts degrees in French and Political Science in 2001. In his first book Stranger to History (2009), which received many reviews in India, he wrote about his estrangement from his father.

== Career ==
Taseer has worked for Time, and as a freelance journalist also written for Prospect, The Sunday Times, The Sunday Telegraph, Financial Times, TAR magazine and Esquire. Taseer's opinion pieces have garnered both attention and critical appreciation. David Goodhart drew attention to Taseer's piece on feudal Pakistan, Travels with the mango king in his article "Prospect's 10 Most Influential Articles". In 2010, he wrote a piece on the controversy surrounding the possible construction of the "Ground Zero Mosque" in Manhattan, Tolerance test for New York.

Since his father's assassination on 6 January 2011, Taseer has written about the situation in Pakistan leading up to and following the incident. These pieces attempt to go far beyond the immediate events surrounding his father's murder. A piece for The Daily Telegraph published just two days after, extended his view from the incident.

On 5 May 2011, a few days after the death of Osama bin Laden, Taseer wrote a piece for the Financial Times titled "Pakistan’s Rogue Army Runs a Shattered State". It was one of the first pieces of journalism to point to the significance that Osama bin Laden had been killed in a Pakistani cantonment town, Abbottabad. In the article, Taseer stated that "he was found in this garrison town because he was the guest of the army."

On 16 July 2011, The Wall Street Journal published a piece its editors provocatively, and somewhat misleadingly, titled "Why My Father Hated India". Although Taseer used his father's distaste for all things Indian as an example, or metaphor, the article attempted to explain a much bigger question – a question about Pakistan's apparent unhealthy obsession with India. It argued that "to understand the Pakistani obsession with India, to get a sense of its special edge – its hysteria – it is necessary to understand the rejection of India, its culture and past, that lies at the heart of the idea of Pakistan", He continued: "In the absence of a true national identity, Pakistan defined itself by its opposition to India." The article remained the most emailed and commented-on on The Wall Street Journal website for days and at the end of July it was by far the most emailed of the month.

The controversy spread when, following an exchange on Twitter between Pakistani journalist, Ejaz Haider and Indian Member of Parliament and former Indian Union Minister and Under-secretary at the UN, Shashi Tharoor. Haider wrote a column in The Express Tribune titled "Aatish’s Personal Fire", Haider stated that Taseer himself seemed to suffer from an identity crisis accusing Taseer of employing "everything except the kitchen sink in order to construct a supposedly linear reality". His central argument was that India – with its massive army arrayed along its border with Pakistan – left Pakistan with no choice but to be deeply concerned with its every move. Tharoor rose to Aatish Taseer's defense; writing in the Deccan Chronicle, in a piece titled "Delusional liberals", he quoted Taseer's original piece extensively and said in general he "admired the young man’s writing", and felt he had made "his point in language that was both sharp [...] heartfelt and accurate". He said that in their vitriolic response to Taseer's piece Pakistan's liberals had exposed themselves and took on Haider point-for-point, saying "that there is not and cannot be an "Indian threat" to Pakistan, simply because there is absolutely nothing Pakistan possesses that India wants." Ejaz Haider subsequently responded strongly stating "Like every other state in the world, Pakistan is also a self-interested state and the rest of the world must live with this fact; three, we have no intention of defenestrating our military, even as we would continue to kick them to extract obedience; four, we don’t need advice from across the border, especially because the Indian pundits crawled on their bellies when Mrs Indira Gandhi slapped her two-year emergency rule. We have seen worse without giving up or giving in. Thank you!"

== Personal life ==
Taseer divides his time between London and New York. In 2015, he married lawyer Ryan Davis in New York. Previously, he was in a relationship with Lady Gabriella Windsor, daughter of Prince and Princess Michael of Kent, whom he had met when she was an undergraduate at Brown University in Providence, Rhode Island, and he at Amherst College in Massachusetts. Although his father was Muslim and his mother a Sikh, Taseer considers himself culturally and historically Hindu. He worships Shiva.

=== Citizenship ===
On 8 November 2019, Taseer's Overseas Citizenship of India was revoked by the Indian Ministry of Home Affairs claiming he attempted to "conceal information that his father was of Pakistani origin". Taseer has said this is untrue, he never concealed the identity of his father with whom he had no contact and his mother was always the only legal guardian as a minor.

Taseer alleged that the ministry didn't give him enough time and that it was an act of reprisal. In his May 2019 cover article for Time magazine, published during the Indian election entitled "India’s divider in chief" he was highly critical of the Indian prime minister, Narendra Modi.

He claimed to The Guardian that his citizenship issue had not caused him any problems before the Time article was published. The Home ministry had rejected the claim that the Time article had any connection to the rejection of Taseer's citizenship.

Taseer became a US citizen on 27 July 2020.

== Works ==
Taseer's first book Stranger to History: A Son's Journey Through Islamic Lands (2009), His part memoir-part travelogue, has been translated into more than 14 languages and hailed as a "must-read" for anyone attempting to understand the Muslim world. Taseer's well received translation of Saadat Hasan Manto's short stories from the original Urdu, Manto: Selected Stories, was published in 2008.

== Bibliography ==
- Manto: Selected Stories, Random House. 2008. ISBN 81-8400-049-9.
- Stranger to History: A Son's Journey Through Islamic Lands, McClelland & Stewart. 2009. ISBN 0-7710-8425-0.
- The Temple-Goers, Viking. 2010. ISBN 978-0-670-91850-8.
- Noon, Faber & Faber in the US; by Picador in India and the UK. 2011. ISBN 978-0-86547-858-9.
- The Way Things Were, Pan Macmillan in UK and India. 2014. ISBN 9789382616337.
- The Twice-Born: Life and Death on the Ganges. 2019.

== Awards ==
- "2010 Costa First Novel Award shortlist" for The Temple-Goers.
