= Kohsar Market =

Commercial area

Kohsar Market is a small upscale commercial area located in the north eastern sub sector of Sector F-6, Islamabad. It is particularly known for its collection of upscale cafes and European restaurants.

== Incident ==
Former Governor of Punjab, Salman Taseer was assassinated in the market on 4 January 2011.

== Shops ==
- Tuscany Courtyard (Italian restaurant)
- Street 1 Café
- Table Talk café
- Gloria Jean's Coffees
- Porterhouse Brewery
- Caffè Mocha
- Bistro
