= Salman Taseer =

Pakistani businessman and politician (1944–2011)

- سلمان تاثیر
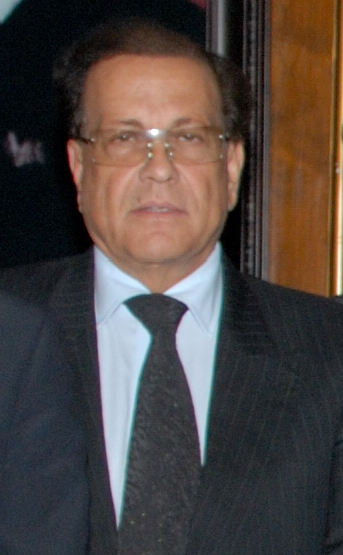

34th Governor of Punjab (Pakistan)
- In office 15 May 2008 – 4 January 2011
- Preceded by: Lt Gen Khalid Maqbool
- Succeeded by: Sardar Latif Khosa

Personal details
- Born: 31 May 1944 Simla, Punjab, British India (Present-day Shimla, Himachal Pradesh, India)
- Died: 4 January 2011 (aged 66) Islamabad, Pakistan
- Party: Pakistan Peoples Party
- Spouse(s): Yasmeen Sehgal; Amna Taseer
- Domestic partner: Tavleen Singh
- Children: 7 including Shahbaz and Aatish Taseer
- Parent(s): M. D. Taseer (father); Bilquis Taseer (mother)
- Relatives: Alys Faiz (maternal aunt); Salima Hashmi (maternal cousin); Muneeza Hashmi (maternal cousin)
- Education: Government College University, Lahore; Institute of Chartered Accountants in England and Wales

Salman Taseer (Urdu: سلمان تاثیر; 31 May 1944 – 4 January 2011) was a Pakistani businessman and politician, who served as the 34th Governor of Punjab from May 2008 until his assassination in January 2011.

A member of the Pakistan Peoples Party since the 1980s, he was elected to the Punjab Assembly from Lahore in the 1988 election, however he lost in the 1990, 1993 and 1997 elections. Taseer served as a minister in the caretaker cabinet of Prime Minister Muhammad Mian Soomro under Pervez Musharraf during the 2008 elections. He was appointed as the governor of Punjab on 15 May 2008, by then-President Musharraf at the request of Prime Minister Yousaf Raza Gillani. During his governorship, he emerged as an outspoken critic of Pakistan's blasphemy laws and consequently called for the pardon for a blasphemy accused Asia Bibi.

Born in Shimla in British India, Taseer studied at the St. Anthony's School and the Government College University, Lahore before moving to London where he studied accountancy at the Institute of Chartered Accountants in England and Wales. In 1994, Taseer established a brokerage house backed by the Smith Barney and in 1996 he founded the Worldcall Group. In 2000s, he ventured into media, launching Business Plus and Daily Times.

On 4 January 2011, Taseer was assassinated at the Kohsar Market in Islamabad by his bodyguard Mumtaz Qadri. Qadri disagreed with Taseer's opposition to Pakistan's blasphemy law, perceiving Taseer's moderate views as an insult to Islam. The Guardian described Taseer's murder as "one of the most traumatic events in recent Pakistani history." A nationwide three-day state of mourning was held in Pakistan, Taseer's funeral prayers were held at the Governors House in Lahore. Taseer's son, Shahbaz, was kidnapped by the Pakistani Taliban in 2011, before being released in 2016, a few months after Taseer's murderer was hanged. Taseer's other son, Shaan, is a leading critic of the country's blasphemy law.

== Early life and education ==
Taseer was born on 31 May 1944, in Shimla, British India, to a mixed-race family, being of Kashmiri descent on his father's side and of English descent on his mother's side. His father was Muhammad Din Taseer (M. D. Taseer), who hailed from Ajnala near Amritsar, and was a professor at Mohammedan Anglo-Oriental College, Amritsar, having obtained his PhD in the United Kingdom. Taseer's mother was Christobel George, a British woman who, upon her wedding, converted to Islam and took the name Bilqis. Taseer's father died in 1950 at the age of 47, when Taseer was only six years old. Taseer and his two sisters were brought up by their mother in relative poverty, in an environment with strong Christian influences. He had little immersion in Pakistani culture, because his mother didn't stay in contact with her late husband's family.

Taseer attended St. Anthony's School where he was a classmate of Nawaz Sharif. He then obtained a degree in Chartered Accountancy from London.

== Personal life ==
Taseer was married twice, and also had two confirmed extra-marital relationships. With his first wife Yasmeen Sehgal, he had one son, Shaan, and two daughters, Sara and Sanam. His second wife, Aamna Taseer, is chairperson of an investment management company. They have two sons, Shahbaz and Shehryar and a daughter, Shehrbano.

Taseer had a brief extramarital relationship with the Indian journalist Tavleen Singh. Taseer met Singh during a book promotion trip to India in March 1980. Their son, Aatish (born 27 November 1980), is a writer and journalist. According to Aatish, the relationship between his parents was an "affair (which) lasted little more than a week." Aatish is a freelance journalist in the UK and has written a book – Stranger to History: A Son’s Journey through Islamic Lands – about his estranged relationship with his biological father.

The other relationship that did not end in marriage was also with an Indian, actress Simi Garewal. His year-long affair with Garewal began in Dubai and ended when he married Aamna Taseer.

== Political career ==
Taseer started his political career in his student era as a member of Zulfikar Ali Bhutto's Pakistan Peoples Party (PPP) in the late 1960s. He was a part of the movement for Bhutto's freedom and opposed his arrest and death sentence. He also wrote a political biography on Bhutto titled Bhutto: A political biography (1980). Taseer was also known to be one of the trusted aides of Bhutto's daughter and political heir, Benazir Bhutto.

In the 1988 general elections, Taseer became a member of the Punjab Assembly from Lahore. In the 1990, 1993 and 1997 general elections, he stood for election to be an MNA but lost. In 2007, he was appointed the interim Federal Minister for Industries, Production and Special Initiatives. On 15 May 2008, Taseer was designated for the office of Governor of Punjab by the PPP-led coalition government.

In December 2010, Taseer was alleged to have left the country for several days without handing over charge to the Punjab Assembly Speaker. This meant that the province was without a constitutional head, and it also rendered the assembly speaker ineligible to preside over sessions. Leaving the province without informing his successor was in violation of the constitution and this led to Punjab Assembly Speaker Rana Muhammad Iqbal sending a letter to Prime Minister Gilani calling for the removal of Salmaan Taseer by the President. Evidence provided by ICAO on the governor's travel abroad led to a case being filed in court for breach of the constitution.

== Business career ==
Taseer set up several chartered accountancy and management consultancy firms early in his career. In 1995 he established the First Capital Securities Corporation (FCSC), a full-service brokerage house with equity participation by Smith Barney, Inc., USA, and HG Asia Hong Kong.

In 1996, Taseer founded the Worldcall group with a payphone network. Over the years, it become a major private-sector telecom operator in Pakistan. A majority stake in Worldcall was acquired in 2008 by Omantel.

In 2001, Taseer founded Media Times which operated an English news channel in Pakistan, Business Plus; a children's channel, Wikkid Plus; a cooking channel, Zaiqa; and published an English-language newspaper Daily Times and an Urdu-language newspaper Aaj Kal.

== Assassination ==
In an interview with Meher Bukhari on Samaa TV, Taseer commented on his view about the country's blasphemy law and on filing a mercy petition for Asia Bibi, who was sentenced to death by a court under the law.

On 4 January 2011, one of Taseer's bodyguards, Malik Mumtaz Qadri, shot him 27 times with an AK-47 assault rifle at Kohsar Market, near his home in Sector F6, Islamabad, as he was returning to his car after meeting a friend for lunch. Kohsar Market is a popular shopping and cafe spot for the city's elite and expatriates. Qadri perceived Taseer's defense of the rights of women and religious minorities as insulting to Islam. Eight hours before his assassination, Taseer tweeted an Urdu couplet by Shakeel Badayuni: "My resolve is so strong that I do not fear the flames from without, I fear only the radiance of the flowers, that it might burn my garden down."

The next day, just hundreds of people turned up for his funeral in Lahore in spite of denunciations by some Sunni clerics and religious scholars against mourning Taseer. Prime Minister Yousuf Raza Gilani and many supporters of the ruling PPP were seen attending the funeral prayer. The funeral prayers were finally led by Allama Afzal Chisti of the Ulema wing of the PPP after the chief cleric of the Badshahi Mosque, who had initially agreed to offer prayers, backed off at the last moment, saying he was going out of town. Taseer was buried at a military cantonment in Lahore.

The assassin Malik Mumtaz Hussain Qadri was from Punjab, and was part of the security detail provided to Taseer by the Elite Police, which also provided protection for other high-profile figures in Lahore including personnel assigned to the American Consulate in Lahore. After the shooting, Qadri threw his weapon down. He reportedly pleaded to be arrested. After the murder, more than 500 clerics voiced support for the murder and urged a general boycott of Taseer's funeral as he supported a blasphemer. Supporters of Mumtaz Qadri blocked police attempting to bring him to the Anti-Terrorism Court in Rawalpindi, and some supporters showered him with rose petals. On 1 October 2011, Qadri was sentenced to death by a Pakistani Anti Terrorist court at Islamabad for murdering Taseer. Qadri was executed on 29 February 2016. Qadri's execution was greeted by "an outpouring of public sympathy" with protests held across the country and an estimated 30,000 attended his funeral, chanting slogans.

Political offices
| Preceded by Lt Gen Khalid Maqbool | Governor of Punjab; 2008–2011 | Succeeded by Latif Khosa |
Political offices
| Preceded by Jehangir Khan Tareen | Federal Minister for Industries, Production and Special Initiatives (acting); 2007–2008 | Unknown |
