= Kidnapping of Shahbaz Taseer =

2011 kidnapping in Pakistan

Shahbaz Taseer
- شہباز تاثیر
- Born: 1983 (age 42–43); Pakistan
- Occupation: Businessman
- Known for: Kidnapping and rescue
- Spouse: Maheen Ghani (divorced) Neha Rajpoot (m. 2021)
- Parent(s): Salmaan Taseer (father, former Governor of Punjab, Pakistan
- Family: Taseer family

Shahbaz Taseer is a Pakistani businessman, and the son of the former Governor of Punjab (Pakistan) Salman Taseer. In August 2011, following his father's assassination, he was kidnapped by militants in Lahore while he was driving to his office from home. Taseer was held in captivity for around four and a half years and was recovered from Kuchlak, Balochistan on 8 March 2016. Taseer's kidnapping was referred as one of the most high-profile kidnappings in Pakistan by The Guardian. BBC's HARDtalk interviewed Taseer about his days in captivity. In an interview, he mentioned that he was held by Uzbek militants, before eventually being passed to the Taliban.

== Life during hostage situation ==
During an interview, Shahbaz Taseer said: "I was ambushed by about five men... My first instinct was they were going to kill me. They drugged me five minutes after abducting me. I passed out - they had beaten me up very badly because I was moving and screaming while being drugged." He further mentioned that the militants used to beat him badly and his fingernails were pulled out. The militants also sewed his mouth shut and kept him starving for days.
