= LGBTQ rights in Pakistan =

- Area controlled by Pakistan shown in dark green; claimed but uncontrolled regions shown in light green.
- Legal status: Illegal since 1947; criminalised under Section 377
- Penalty: De jure: Death penalty; proof requirements high; no evidence of judicial implementation; De facto: 2 years–life imprisonment; fines.
- Gender identity: Third gender recognised; transgender people allowed to change legal gender
- Military: No
- Discrimination protections: Gender identity only, not sexuality

Family rights
- Recognition of relationships: No recognition of same-sex unions
- Adoption: No

Same-sex sexual activity is illegal in Pakistan.

The Pakistan Penal Code (originally developed as the Indian Penal Code under the British Raj), criminalises sodomy with possible penalties of prison sentences from two years to a life sentence and fines. Despite its illegality, homosexual acts are only occasionally prosecuted by authorities, but it is sometimes used to threaten and harass homosexuals under threat of prosecution. Other morality and public order provisions in the Penal Code are used to target LGBTQ Pakistanis as well. Another greater problem can be vigilante policing and killings by Islamist and terrorist groups. Police may also act illegally and arrest LGBTQ individuals despite the law stating otherwise.

A majority of the people living in Pakistan believe that homosexuality is a sin in Islam. Nearly all religious leaders agree that the story of the prophet Lut shows that Islam does not approve of homosexuality. Multiple clerics call for punishment of homosexuals based on the Sharia. Nevertheless, the LGBTQ community is still able to socialise, organise, date, and even—in rare cases—live together as couples, if done mostly in secret.

== Implementation of law ==
Section 377 of the Pakistan Penal Code (PPC) defines 'carnal intercourse against the order of nature', as punishable by a fine and/or imprisonment for a period of 2 years to life. This rarely lead to convictions or prosecutions in the judicial courts, but have sometimes been used by police as a means to extract bribes or sexual favours under threat of prosecution, particularly against homosexual men and transgender women, who may also be subject to harassment, humiliation, and violence by the police, including sexual violence. The UN noted that there had been arrests of homosexuals within the past three years in 2018, 2019 and 2022.

The Offence of Zina in the Enforcement Of Hudood Ordinance criminalizes any form of penetration in a sexual act outside of marriage. Sharia law carries heavy penalties for homosexuality from imprisonment for 2–10 years or for life, or of 100 lashes or stoning to death if the person is married. The IRB noted that due to the proof-of-evidence requirements, convictions under Sharia Law are rare, but that the fear remained very high. The IGLA noted that though the death penalty remains optional, it has no evidence that the death penalty was ever implemented.

2018 Transgender Persons (Protection of Rights) Act (TPPR Act) provides transgender people with recognition. However numerous sourced noted that transgender people continued to be illegally arrested and those who have been legally identified as a certain gender are often treated as the opposing gender.

Due to a lack of anti-discrimination protections and widespread homophobia among authorities, LGBTQ are generally reluctant to be open about their sexuality as they may face abuses such as forced marriage, honor killings, humiliation, societal discrimination and harassment. They worry that if their sexuality is known, they may be exposed to violence or blackmail.

A person living openly as LGBTQ is likely to be at risk of treatment from non-state actors such as Islamist organizations and terrorist groups.

== Legality of same-sex sexual activity ==
Pakistani law is a mixture of both British law and Islamic law. The section of the Penal Code criminalising consensual same-sex relations was inherited from the colonial rule of the British Raj; it was enacted on 6 October 1860 and went into force on 1 January 1862. Written by Lord Macaulay, the then-named Indian Penal Code 1860, made male same-sex sexual acts illegal under the British law of "Unnatural Offences". After Pakistan gained independence in 1947, the Parliament retained the Penal Code, merely changing the title to Pakistan Penal Code (Act XLV of 1860). Within the Penal Code, Article 377 ("Unnatural Offences") states: "Whoever voluntarily has carnal intercourse against the order of nature with any man, woman or animal, shall be punished with imprisonment ... for a term which shall not be less than two years nor more than ten years, and shall also be liable to fine".

It is likely that the region that encompasses Pakistan had been influenced by homophobic values at a much earlier period than other Asian regions such as the Indosphere and Sinosphere. Evidence from literary works and artworks relating to Zoroastrianism, Buddhism and Islam suggest that non-heterosexual sex was looked down upon or forbidden since at least 250 B.C. Historically around 250 BC, during the Parthian Empire, the Zoroastrian text Vendidad was written. It contains provisions that are part of sexual code promoting procreative sexuality that is interpreted to prohibit same-sex intercourse as sinful. Ancient commentary on this passage suggests that those engaging in sodomy could be killed without permission from a high priest.

Implementation of the laws against homosexuality are generally unenforced but do still happen. In 2014 a Pakistani man sought asylum in Australia for fear of being jailed for homosexuality in Pakistan. In early 2023 numerous people were arrested for engaging in homosexual pornography. A greater problem can be vigilante policing and killings by Islamist and terrorist groups.

As part of the Islamization in Pakistan under Muhammad Zia-ul-Haq, the Hudud Ordinances were enacted in 1979, stipulating severe punishments for adultery, fornication, consuming alcohol and sodomy. According to the United States State Department's 2021 annual report on human rights practices in Pakistan, the Hudood Ordinances have not been enforced "since the 1985 lifting of martial law", and there are no known cases of it being applied to same-sex sexual conduct. No known executions for homosexual activity have occurred.

=== Pakistan Penal Code of 1860 ===
Relevant sections of the penal code are as follows:

- Article 141 – An assembly of five or more persons is designated an "unlawful assembly" if the common object of the persons composing that assembly is ... to commit any mischief or criminal trespass, or other offence.
- Article 153 – Whoever by words, either spoken or written, or by signs, or by visible representations, or otherwise, induce or attempts to induce any student, or any class of students, or any institution interested in or connected with students, to take part in any political activity which disturbs or undermines, or is likely disturb or undermine, the public order shall be punished with imprisonment which may extend to two years or – with fine or with both.
- Article 268 – A person is guilty of a public nuisance who does any act or is guilty of an illegal omission which causes any common injury, danger or annoyance to the public or to the people in general who dwell or occupy property in the vicinity, or which must necessarily cause injury, obstruction, danger or annoyance to persons who may have occasion to use any public right.
- Article 269 – Whoever unlawfully or negligently does any act which is, and which he knows or has reason to believe to be, likely to spread the infection of any disease dangerous to life, shall be punished with imprisonment of either description for a term which may extend to six months, or with fine, or with both.
- Article 270 – Whoever malignantly does any act which is, and which he knows or has reason to believe to be, likely to spread the infection of any disease dangerous to life, shall be punished with imprisonment of either description for a term which may extend to two years, or with fine, or with both.
- Article 290 – Whoever commits a public nuisance in any case not otherwise punishable by this Code, shall be punished with fine which may extend to six hundred rupees.
- Article 292 – Prohibits the sale, distribution, exhibition, ownership or importation of any, "obscene" books, pamphlets, or other literature or images.
- Article 294 – Prohibits any "obscene" public acts, songs, music or poems.
- Article 371A – Whoever sells, lets to hire, or otherwise disposes of any person with intent that such a person shall at any time be employed or used for the purpose of prostitution or illicit intercourse with any person or for any unlawful and immoral purpose, or knowing it to be likely that such person shall at any time be employed or used for any such purpose, shall be punished with imprisonment which may extend to twenty-five years, and shall also be liable to fine.
- Article 371B – When a female is sold, let for hire, or otherwise disposed of to a prostitute or to any person who keeps or manages a brothel, the person so disposing of such female shall, until the contrary is proved, be presumed to have disposed of her with the intent that she shall be used for the purpose of prostitution. For the purposes of this section and section 371B, "illicit intercourse" means sexual intercourse between persons not united by marriage.
- Article 377 – Whoever voluntarily has carnal intercourse against the order of nature with any man, woman or animal, shall be punished with imprisonment for life, or with imprisonment of either description for a term which shall not be less than two years nor more than ten years, and shall also be liable to fine. Penetration is sufficient to constitute the carnal intercourse necessary to the offence described in this section.
- Article 496 – Whoever, dishonestly or with a fraudulent intention, goes through the ceremony of being married, knowing that he is not thereby lawfully married, shall be punished with imprisonment of either description for a term which may extend to seven years, and shall be liable to fine.

== Constitutional rights ==
The Pakistani Constitution does not explicitly make mention of sexual orientation or gender identity. It does contain certain provisions that may impact the constitutional rights of LGBTQ Pakistani citizens.

- Part II 37. The government pledges to promote Islamic values among its Muslim citizens, to protect marriage and the family and to oppose obscenity.
- Part IX 227. Islam is the official state religion, and all laws, rules, regulations and other such legislation must be compatible with Islam, as defined by a government appointed Islamic council.

== Discrimination protections ==
No civil rights legislation exists to prohibit public or private sector discrimination on the basis of sexual orientation. However, since 2018, discrimination on the basis of gender identity is prohibited in a wide range of areas, including employment, education, health care, access to goods and services, housing and public office. The International Commission of Jurists summarises the coverage of the act:

Chapter three of the Transgender Persons (Protection of Rights) Act prohibits discrimination against transgender people. It states that "no person" shall discriminate against a transgender person with respect to a number of contexts, and lists, among others, educational facilities; employment; healthcare; access to goods and services; housing; and holding public office.

Sociologists Stephen O. Murray and Badruddin Khan have written that the penal laws themselves are rarely enforced directly, but are used by the police and other private citizens as a form of blackmail.

In March 2012, at the Human Rights Council, Hina Jilani, who was then also Chair of the Human Rights Commission of Pakistan and former Special Representative of the Secretary-General, said,

it was very important to emphasise that a serious obstacle was the persistent denial of protection for people from violence on the basis of sexual orientation and gender identity. That denial and rejection were not prudent for any Government that claimed the commitment to the promotion and protection of human rights. It was not convincing when culture and religion were used as a shield and an excuse for failure to protect. There was no notion of responsibility that allowed duty bearers to selectively hold out on protection.

== Gender identity and expression ==
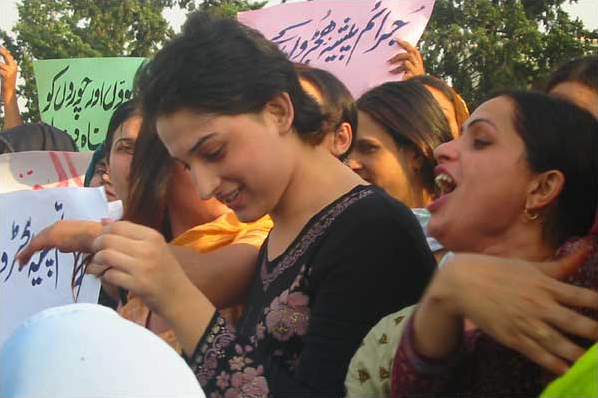
A group of khawaja saras and transgender people protest in Islamabad.

In most South Asian nations, there is a concept of third gender where members are referred to by society as neither man nor a woman. Pakistan is no different and has a vibrant culture of hijras (ہیجڑا). While the term is commonly used in South Asia, it is considered derogatory in Urdu and the term khawaja sara (خواجہ سرا) is used instead. They are sometimes referred to as transgender, intersex or eunuchs in English language publications. Like transgender people in many countries, they are sometimes the subjects of ridicule, abuse, and violence. That said, they enjoy a certain level of acceptance due to their position in precolonial society. For example, they are welcome at weddings where they will dance as entertainment for the men, and are also welcome among the women.

Their presence in society is usually tolerated and are considered blessed in the Pakistani culture. Most khawaja saras are deemed to have been direct cultural descendants of the court eunuchs of the Mughal era. Thought to be born with genital dysphoria and afraid that they might curse one their fate, people listen to their needs, give them alms, and invite their presence at various events and functions, e.g., birth of a child, circumcisions, or weddings. This mysteriousness that shrouds their existence was born of the fact that the khawaja sara communities live a very secretive life. In 2004, it was reported that Lahore alone has 10,000 active transvestites.

People have started accepting sex reassignment surgery to change their sex as a norm as compelled by gender dysphoria. There are situations where such cases have come into the limelight. A 2008 ruling at Pakistan's Lahore High Court gave permission to Naureen, 28, to have a sex change operation, although the decision was applicable only towards people suffering from gender dysphoria.

In 2009, the Pakistani Supreme Court ruled in favour of a group of transvestites. The landmark ruling stated that as citizens they were entitled to the equal benefit from the federal and provincial governments' financial support schemes such as the Benazir Income Support Programme (BISP). Pakistan's Chief Justice, Iftikhar Chaudhry, was the architect of major extension of rights to Pakistan's transgender community during his term.

In 2010, the Supreme Court ordered the full recognition of the transgender community, including the provision of free medical and educational facilities, microcredit schemes and job quotas for transgender people in every government department. They did not order protections for transgender people against discrimination in public services or housing.

In 2017, the Lahore High Court ordered the Government to include transgender people in the national census.

In February 2018, a Senate committee determined that transgender people could inherit property without being required to have their gender decided by a medical board.

In May 2019, Shireen Mazari, the Federal Minister for Human Rights, appointed Ayesha Moghul, a transgender woman to her department for the first time.

=== Transgender Person (Protection of Rights) Act 2018 ===
Under the Transgender Person (Protection of Rights) Act 2018 (Urdu: مُتَجَنَّس افراد کے لیے (تحفظ حقوق) قانون 2018ء), Pakistanis may choose to self-identify as male, female, both or neither. They may express their gender according to their own preferences, and they may have their gender identity of choice reflected on their documents, "including National Identification Cards, passports, driver's licenses and education certificates." The act ensures transgender people's "fundamental rights to inheritance, education, employment, vote, hold public office, health, assembly, and access to public spaces and property. It confirms that they enjoy all the rights that the nation’s constitution grants to its citizens." The act has been challenged and in May 2023 the Federal Shariat Court of Pakistan ruled that the sections dealing with self-perceived gender were not in line with Islamic principles. It ruled sections 2(f), 3 and 7 invalid. All provisions of the act will remain in force until the appeals processes are exhausted. Local transgender advocacy groups have indicated they will appeal.

The act defines "transgender person" as someone with a "mixture of male and female genital features or congenital ambiguities", or, a male who "undergoes genital excision or castration", or, more broadly, "any person whose gender identity and/or gender expression differs from the social norms and cultural expectations based on the sex they were assigned at the time of their birth," which allows people to self-identify as such. They are guaranteed the right to inherit assets and to run for public office. The law has been widely hailed by Pakistani transgender activists as progressive in its language and scope. Mehlab Jameel, an activist and researcher who worked with the Parliamentarians to draft the law, said that "This kind of development is not only unprecedented in Pakistani history, but it's one of the most progressive laws in the whole world."

The bill unanimously passed the Pakistani Senate in early March 2018. On 8 May 2018, the National Assembly voted to pass the bill. It was signed into law when acting President Muhammad Sadiq Sanjrani gave his assent on 18 May 2018.

In August 2018, the School Education Department of the largest province in the country, Punjab, instructed its officials to guarantee equal access to schools to transgender children as per the legislation. The department told its officials to include their gender when they are being admitted to schools and give equal importance to transgender children during enrolment drives. The department advised its officials that the instructions were binding on government as well as privately owned schools in the province. Punjab became the first province to take practical steps in the implementation of the Act.

A petition to challenge the Act was filed in 2020 with the Federal Shariat Court of Pakistan. The challenge was based on an argument that rather than protections for transgender rights, the act could in effect decriminalise homosexuality because it distinguished between gender and sex. On 19 May 2023, the Shariat Court ruled in favour of the petitioners, concluding that Islamic law is based on biological sex, and declaring that sections 2(f), 3 and 7 of the Act, concerning self-perceived gender, do not conform with Islamic principles. Local transgender groups have said they plan to lodge appeals with the Shariat Appellate Bench of the Supreme Court. Until a final ruling is rendered, the provisions of the Act will remain in effect. In addition, the Court's judgement confirmed the legitimacy of a third gender for intersex persons under Islamic law.

== Acceptance in media and popular culture ==
=== Gay and lesbian ===
Media discussions of LGB people in Pakistan include a 2015 documentary How Gay is Pakistan? and a 2016 Vice documentary Blackout: Being LGBT in the Islamic Republic of Pakistan. In 2015, Mawaan Rizwan traveled to Pakistan, his country of birth, to film the documentary How Gay Is Pakistan? which explores the issues faced by other LGBTQ Muslims living under Islamic law that deems homosexuality illegal. The documentary was televised internationally, including on ABC2 in Australia, CBC in Canada and in various markets via Amazon Prime Video.

On 9 June 2016, Vice News released a short documentary in which they showed different members of the LGBTQ community in Lahore. Young men who are sex workers were shown in the video and they explained the difficulties of being gay in Pakistan. The documentary also focused on some underground organizations that work for basic human rights for the LGBTQ community. In the film, there is a short clip of a young boy getting beaten up after being caught being sodomized with a tree branch by a man. There is also a clip of an interview with a local who flaunts how he killed a man raping a 15-year-old boy along with the victim. It also displayed how gay and transgender people use social media apps like Tinder to get in contact with other people of the community. However, this documentary, made in collaboration with Google's technology incubator Jigsaw, has been criticized by some for its sensational approach and blatantly showcasing Google's agenda of juxtaposing empowerment through digital technologies such as Tinder and the collective backwardness and oppression as shown through the blurred video of the young boy being beaten.

=== Transgender ===
In 2005, Ali Saleem, 28, the son of an army colonel, appeared on Geo TV's Hum Sub Umeed Se Hain as cross-dressed Benazir Bhutto. So loved were his performances that he has taken to act to extremes on-air and presents his own talk show where he appears as a dragged-up character named Begum Nawazish Ali. Begum would almost always interview influential politicians, e.g. Naimatullah Khan who was a member of Jamaat-e-Islami Pakistan and former Mayor of Karachi. His character self is often compared to Dame Edna Everage.

To raise awareness of LGBTQ issues, author Eiynah published a children's book called My Chacha is Gay. The topic of LGBTQ issues remains taboo in Pakistan to discuss, despite curiosity. Relative to its total Google searches, for the year ending 15 June 2013, Pakistan was the world leader for searches of the term "shemale sex", second in the world for searches of "man fucking man", and third in the world for searches of "gay sex pics". As per reports from local human rights organizations, a minimum of 65 transgender women have lost their lives in the Khyber Pakhtunkhwa province since 2015. Tragically, numerous transgender individuals in Pakistan have also faced horrific incidents of gang rape and murder. These heinous acts have garnered extensive condemnation across various social media platforms.

In June 2016, a small clerical body in Lahore known as Tanzeem Ittehad-i-Ummat declared transgender marriages legal under Islamic law.

While Pakistan has addressed a "third" gender when identifying transgender people, Sid believes more can be done. Sid is quoted as saying "We have to understand that by just mentioning the third gender identity on your CNIC, the state has not done enough. It is not enough that the government has fixed a two percent job quota either. No! It’s a protracted fight that we have to continue to get equal opportunities".

Prior to the photoshoot, Sid had already been a part of two documentaries How Gay is Pakistan? and Chuppan Chuppai to shed light on what it means to be transgender in Pakistan. In January 2017, Sid discussed a new movie she was starring in, Rani, in which she played a transgender woman who finds an abandoned baby and raises it as her own. Hina Pathani, another prominent transgender activist, starred alongside Kami Sid in Rani. The movie was directed by Hammad Rizvi, and produced by GrayScale. Sid was hopeful that it would have a positive impact on Pakistan's societal view of transgender people, much like the photoshoot. Sid was helpful in the development of the show by providing advice on the preconceived notions of transgender people in the TV show Khuda Mera Bhi Hai. Asma Nabeel, the writer of the show, consulted Sid for guidance on transgender questions.

Kami Sid was also accused of rape and sexual assault after which Aurat March organisers removed her from serving as a part of their organising team in 2018. Though Sid rejects the allegations, Aurat March organisers issued a statement that she intimidated them. Kami Sid's participation in the PR campaign Change The Clap has also been critiqued for appeasing neoliberal forces and ignoring local practices of the Khawaja Sira community.

In March 2017, a well-known music band featured a transgender model Rimal Ali in their music video. Rimal Ali has performed as an actress and model in many music videos to further her career.

In March 2017, Mani AQ became the first transgender man in Pakistan's history to officially register himself as male. Mani is a well known human rights activist and also one of the task force team members who were closely involved during the Transgender Act 2018 and now involved in the Provincial bill for Transgender Person Protection of Rights. He is actively working on the implementation of the Act, inclusion of transgender men in policies, and for visibility of transgender men in Pakistan.

In 2018, Nisha Rao attained her law degree from Karachi's Sindh Muslim Law College and became Pakistan's first transgender lawyer.

In early 2019 the word transgender appeared for the first time in the Urdu language, translated as مُتَجَنَّس (mutajannis) by the Lahore-based organisation, HOPE - Have Only Positive Expectations. Before this, no term or translation existed to cover the whole transgender spectrum in Urdu. The new term encompasses transgender women (MTF), transgender men (FTM), non-binary people, khawja sira, and other gender expressions.

In 2020, a transgender woman named Gul Panra was shot dead in the Pakistani city of Peshawar. This is the latest case of attacks on the LGBTQ community in the county. Along with her, a friend of Gul's were also injured, but escaped death. Since 2015, it is reported that 68 transgender people were murdered in Pakistan. However, a total of 479 transgender people were attacked since 2018 in the Pakistani province of Khyber-Pakhtunkhwa alone. But, these figures may not include the actual figure, as recording of anti-trans violence is poor.

== Living conditions ==
Sexual encounters between same-sex partners are more accessible in Lahore, in particular for gay and bisexual men. As a result of globalisation, increasing liberalisation trends and advancing social tolerance, private gay parties in Lahore have been increasing for a number of years. In addition, there is a growing number of individuals—generally from more affluent and educated families—who are coming out to their friends and introducing them to their same-sex partner.

Metropolitan areas like Lahore and Karachi have seen many gay men, mostly from the middle and upper classes socializing at queer parties. An anonymous interviewee told the BBC that he cannot remember an occasion in almost 10 years that he has felt threatened with regards to his sexuality in Pakistan.

In 2005, a man named Liaquat Ali, 42, from the Khyber region bordering Afghanistan married fellow tribesman Markeen, 16, with the usual pomp and show associated with tribal weddings. Upon hearing of the man's religious infidelity, a tribal council told the pair to leave the area or face death.

While there has been a small degree of progress in representation of male homosexuality in society, lesbianism has lesser exposure in the country and publicised events of women indulging in same-sex relationships are rare. One such court case, decided in 2008, displayed the same disapproving attitude towards a lesbian relationship as it would have towards two men involved.

In 2016, a 23-year-old activist named Alisha was shot seven times and was taken to Lady Reading Hospital in Peshawar, where she was left to bleed to death as the staff argued over whether they should take Alisha to the men's ward or women's ward. Alisha's friends reported that the men discrimined against and taunted them, asked if Alisha's blood was "HIV-positive" and asked for her friend's phone number to invite her to a dance party. Alisha was an avid activist for the transgender community and worked hard all her life to make a living. Alisha's friend Farzana said that transgender people are easily targeted as they are weak and have no social status. Even though the Government has passed laws in favour of transgender people, the locals tend to not accept them and deny them basic education and healthcare. The morning after Alisha's death, an activist group called Trans Action posted a status on Facebook directed to the local authorities saying, "Kill all of us."

In November 2017, a transgender woman was gunned down in Peshawar. Initial reports from the police suggest that the perpetrator was closely related to the victim and that it might be an incident of honour killing.

In 2017, in an interview with Manchester Evening News, a 40-year-old woman who used the name Zayna talked about her life as a lesbian Muslim in Pakistan before she moved to the United Kingdom. She talked about how she had to face major beatings and a lot of discrimination. She was told she cannot be a lesbian if she is a Muslim and was told to leave her university and workplace because of her sexuality.

Some transgender women in Pakistan use hormones and silicone to bring focus on their feminine characteristics; however, this is usually done in terrible medical conditions without proper equipment and supervision, as expensive sex change surgeries in Pakistan are not done mostly due to lack of education on the topic and the taboos of society.

Even though the Pakistani government recognises a third gender on ID cards, many people from the transgender community are hesitant to apply for it as they will not be allowed to enter the holy city of Mecca in Saudi Arabia as a transgender person.

=== Government stance ===
==== UNHRC vote ====
The Pakistani Government has always shown resistance towards the issue of LGBTQ rights and never hid its intolerance. A United Nations vote cast on 25 April 2003 on issues of LGBTQ human rights was derailed at the last minute by an alliance of five disapproving Muslim countries, including Pakistan. The others were Egypt, Libya, Saudi Arabia and Malaysia.

The countries delayed their votes to stall the process and proposed amendments that were meant to kill the measure deliberately, removing all references to discrimination on the basis of sexual orientation, rendering the resolution meaningless. The resolution was tabled by Brazil with support from 19 of the 53 member countries of the UN Human Rights Commission (UNHRC) in Geneva. It called on member states to promote and protect the human rights of all persons, regardless of their sexual orientation.

=== Politics ===
Political parties, interest groups and other political organisations in Pakistan are required to support Islam and public morality. The small Green Party has expressed some support for LGBTQ rights, but political groups tend to avoid the issue or express opposition.

Transgender people are treated differently, at least on paper, than gay, lesbian and bisexual people. Pakistani citizens who are transgender or a member of the third gender are a recognised minority group and are thus entitled to certain civil rights.

=== Media ===
Pakistani media strictly censors LGBTQ related news stories. In late 2013, the Government of Pakistan censored the website Queerpk.com from being viewed.

When a Chinese court accepted to hear a case regarding the issue of same-sex marriage, the news story received substantial international coverage. However, in the Pakistani version of the International New York Times (Express Tribune), the picture accompanying the article was censored and a blank space was left on the front page of the newspaper. Daily Times columnist Farman Nawaz raised several questions about this kind of journalistic approach.

In July 2016, a young Pakistani man named Ihsan wrote an article in the UK-based gay e-zine Gay Star News about his experiences of being gay in Pakistan. He described Pakistani society and laws as hostile towards LGBTQ people. He wrote, "The status of LGBTI people, socially and legally, is at its worst. LGBTI people face prosecution by the state. And the subject is still taboo – considered too disgusting to talk about." His surname was omitted for his security.

While national media and state have censored queer discourses, transnational documentaries such as How Gay is Pakistan?, Being LGBTQ in the Islamic Republic of Pakistan, and Transgenders: Pakistan's Open Secret have been critiqued for their neo-colonial, self-othering, disciplinary, and moralistic narratives. Similar documentaries made on other countries such as Uganda and Turkey have been critiqued for their tourist gaze, inadequate research, sweeping statements, and sensational approaches that create binary between sexually empowered Western countries and sexually backward rest of the world.

=== HIV/AIDS ===
The AIDS pandemic first arose in Pakistan in 1987, and government reports estimate (as of 2004) that nearly 3,000 Pakistanis were living with the syndrome, although several critics believe that the Government is underestimating the problem. It is believed that the number may have risen to somewhere between 70,000 and 80,000 people, and possibly as high as 210,000 (as in the UNAIDS Pakistan reports).

Today, a small number of organisations exist in Pakistan to promote greater education about HIV/AIDS, including the Association for People Living With AIDS/HIV in Pakistan, which was created in 2006.

Ignorance about the virus, and how it is spread, is commonplace; this is particularly true among people performing high-risk behaviour such as prostitutes. Pakistani prostitutes do not have access to condoms or contraception, and there is little effort to provide any sort of public health education for this high-risk group.

Where there was no public call for tolerance or acceptance of LGBTQ people, the subject of sexual orientation and gender identity are becoming more openly discussed, especially in light of the HIV/AIDS pandemic.

A survey done in 2009 showed that male and transgender sex workers in Pakistan were at high risk of HIV/AIDS mostly as they had sex with IDU clients. Because of lack of knowledge and education on this topic, the health of sex workers is at risk.

== US Embassy Islamabad incident ==
On 4 July 2011, the US Embassy in Islamabad hosted an LGBTQ event in support of gay rights in Pakistan. The embassy described the event as its first gay, lesbian, bisexual and transgender pride celebration. Jamaat-e-Islami and other groups of religious conservatives in Pakistan condemned the event and protested. Over 75 people attended, including Pakistani LGBTQ organisation advocates. Many Pakistanis were greatly offended by this and called this event an act of "social and cultural terrorism against the country". In news speculation, it was also said by religious leaders that homosexuals cannot be "Pakistani" or "Muslim". Dawn wrote that it was seen as the second most dangerous attack from the US to Pakistan after dropping missiles as this issue was so serious. Violence against the LGBTQ community raised a lot after this controversial incident. The US Deputy Chief of Mission Ambassador Richard Hoagland replied back to the backlash saying that the US will fight for equal rights for everyone regardless of their sexual orientation and that the embassy will support anyone from the LGBTQ community. However, many LGBTQ advocates from Pakistan were not in support of everything that had happened and thought that the public eye was not what was needed for the LGBTQ community.

== Public opinion ==
Public opinion regarding LGBTQ politics is complex. In June 2013, the Pew Research Center stated that of 39 countries studied, Pakistan was one of the least accepting of homosexuality with 87 percent of those surveyed saying "Homosexuality should not be accepted by society".

According to a 2017 poll carried out by ILGA, a plurality of 45 percent of Pakistanis agreed that gay, lesbian, and bisexual individuals should enjoy the same rights as straight people, while 36 percent disagreed, with the remainder being undecided. Additionally, 41 percent agreed that these individuals should be protected from workplace discrimination. However, 46 percent of Pakistanis stated that people in same-sex relationships should be charged as criminals, while 31 percent disagreed. Regarding transgender individuals, 49 percent agreed that they should have the same rights, 51 percent believed they should be protected from employment discrimination, and 44 percent believed they should be allowed to change their legal gender.

According to a World Values Survey from 2017 to 2020, 44 percent of Pakistanis said that same-sex couples are as good parents as heterosexual couples, while 31 percent disagreed. In the same survey, 59 percent of Pakistanis said they would accept a homosexual neighbour, while 41 percent would not.

== Summary table ==
Same-sex sexual activity legal	No Criminalized under Article 377. (Penalty: from two years to life imprisonment, fines, or both. Hudood ordinances which notionally allow capital punishment, unenforced since 1985; have never been used to prosecute homosexual acts.)
Equal age of consent	No
Anti-discrimination laws in employment	No / Yes For gender identity only (since 2018)
Anti-discrimination laws in the provision of goods and services	No / Yes For gender identity only (since 2018)
Anti-discrimination laws in all other areas (incl. indirect discrimination, hate speech)	No / Yes For gender identity only (since 2018)
Same-sex marriages	No
Same-sex civil unions	No
Recognition of same-sex couples	No
Stepchild adoption by same-sex couples	No
Joint adoption by same-sex couples	No
LGBTQ allowed to serve in the military	No
Right to change legal gender	Yes (Since 2010)
Third gender recognised	Yes (Since 2010)
Access to IVF for lesbians	No
Commercial surrogacy for gay male couples	No
MSMs allowed to donate blood	No

== See also ==
- Capital punishment for homosexuality
- LGBTQ history in Pakistan
- Prostitution in Pakistan
- LGBTQ rights in Asia
- Al-Fatiha Foundation
- Human rights in Pakistan
