= LGBTQ history in Pakistan =

LGBTQ people have a long history of persecution in Pakistan.

In 2009, the Supreme Court of Pakistan legally recognized transgender people as a third gender.

== History ==
The first reference to homosexuality can be found during the era of the Achaemenid empire from the 6th century BCE onwards. In 521 BCE, the Achaemenid Empire crucifies Polycrates and suppresses pederasty in Samos, which causes pederastic poets Ibycus and Anacreon to flee Samos.

Around 250 BC, during the Parthian Empire, the Zoroastrian text Vendidad was written. It contains provisions that are part of a sexual code promoting procreative sexuality that is interpreted to prohibit same-sex intercourse as sinful. Ancient commentary on this passage suggests that those engaging in sodomy could be killed without permission from a high priest.

By 634 BCE, the Rashidun Caliphate reached the coastal region of Makran in present-day Balochistan.

During the Mughal Empire, a number of the pre-existing Delhi Sultanate laws were combined into the Fatawa-e-Alamgiri, mandating several types of punishments for homosexuality. These could include 50 lashes for a slave, 100 for a free infidel, or death by stoning for a Muslim.

=== British India ===
The Colonial British government criminalized lesbian, gay, bisexual, and transgender (LGBT) activities in India under section 377 of the Indian Penal code of 1860. Pakistan gained independence in 1947 and adapted the same laws regarding LGBT under the Pakistan Penal Code. The Pakistan Penal Code states, "Whoever voluntarily has carnal intercourse against the order of nature with any man, woman or animal, shall be punished with imprisonment for life, or with imprisonment of either description for a term which shall not be less than two years nor more than ten years, and shall also be liable to fine."

=== Modern Pakistan ===
In the 1980s, the rules against LGBT community stiffened even more under the sixth president of Pakistan, General Muhammad Zia-ul-Haq. The punishment for homosexual activities increased to life imprisonment or even death by stoning as a result of the Sharia Law added to Pakistan Penal Code. There was some support for LGBTQ identities in major cities like Lahore and Karachi; there were secret gay parties during the regime of General Pervez Musharraf. Ali Saleem, son of a retired army colonel, appeared on television dressed as a woman, and openly talked about his bisexuality.

The religious leaders of Pakistan have consistently forbidden and condemned LGBT activities as being immoral under the constitution of Islam.

People in Pakistan who consider themselves to be a part of the LGBT community do not express their sexuality in public due to bigotry and fear of being physically attacked.

Muhammad Ejaz, a paramedic in Lahore, entered the homes of three men he met on the gay social networking site, Manjam, and killed them. Two of the men were in their 20s and one was middle-aged retired army major. Eijaz stated, "I tried to convince them to stop their dirty acts, but they would not, so I decided to kill them." The social networking site, Manjam, has since then not allowed any Pakistani individuals to sign up on their site for security reasons. Eijaz was taken into custody by the Pakistani Police, who insisted that he had sex with the victims before killing them.

=== Violence against the LGBT Community ===
Cases of violence against members of the LGBT community are very common in Pakistan. Members of the LGBT community in Pakistan rarely report assaults committed against them to the police, in fact The Immigration and Refugee Board of Canada (IRBC) noted in January 2014 that if an LGBT person who faced threats from family or community members went to the police, the police "may become an accomplice rather than a protector."

According to TransAction Alliance, as of June 2016 there were more than 300 cases of violence against transgender people in Khyber Pakhtunkhwa alone, and 46 transgender people had been killed since January 2015. There are reports that show that violence against transgender individuals has been increasing every year.

=== Actions ===
After a long period of public protests and appeals, in 2009, the Supreme Court of Pakistan legally recognized transgender people as a third gender and promised them a Computerised National Identity Card (CNIC). The court also directed government agencies and offices to employ transgender people, but that has not been widely implemented. However, Cantonment Board Faisal (CBF) sent out an advertisement for the employment of transgender people in Tax Recovery. As many as 15 transgender people were employed after the first advertisement. The government has also issued voter cards for the transgender community.

== See also ==
- LGBT rights in Pakistan
- Violence against LGBT people

== Other websites ==
- Islam e Omosessualità - Allah Loves Equality
