= Probation in Pakistan =

The concept of probation was introduced to Pakistan, then part of British India, in 1923. This initial system amounted to binding over some first-time offenders, without supervision by probation staff, and applied chiefly to young offenders. Reforms and extension to adult offenders were considered but not implemented under British rule, although a form of "probational release" or parole from longer prison sentences was introduced in the then province of Punjab in 1926.

The current probation system originates from legislation introduced in independent Pakistan in 1960. This provides two alternatives to a prison sentence: conditional discharge or a probation order. Probation may apply to convicts of any age, but is excluded in the case of specified serious offences. The court's decision on the suitability of probation is informed by reports from the police and probation service. The probation order requires that the subject is bound-over not to re-offend, and places him or her under the supervision of a probation officer for between one and three years, sometimes with extra conditions on place of residence and other behaviours.

Further legislation in 2000 expands the role of the probation service in investigating the cases of young offenders. Parole continues as a separate system.

== British India ==
Prior to Pakistan's Independence in August 1947, Pakistan was part of British India. As the system of probation was established in Europe, the British colonial rulers amended the Code of Criminal Procedure (India) 1898 (Act V) in 1923 by the insertion of sections 380 and 562 to 564, introducing the concept of probation to the Indian Subcontinent.

These new sections provided for the release of offenders "on probation of good conduct" but failed to make provision for any system of supervision. The insertions were also restricted to the first-offenders and confined to some extent with respect to the legal character of the offense, provision being made for more liberal application of the measure in respect of minors and women.

The procedure provided by the amending legislation in 1923 involved the release of offenders on their entering into a bond, without sureties; to appear for sentence when called upon during a period, not exceeding three years, as determined by the court; and "in the meantime to keep the peace and be of good behavior".

The Code's section 562, which now stands repealed under the Probation of Offenders Ordinance 1960, provided the Court with various alternatives while dealing with a juvenile offender. These options included whipping; imposition of fine or security; treatment under section 31 of the Reformatory Schools Act 1897 (No VIII); detention in a reformatory school; or ordering imprisonment.

Some High Courts recommended to the concerned magistrates that if the offender was not convicted of murder or any other flagrant offense and did not show any marked criminal tendencies, then the courts should make free use of the section 562 provisions. The magistrates were asked to refrain from sending boys of tender age to the Borstal institutions or Reformatory Schools. Young boys were considered out of place in Borstal institutions because they are likely to interact with older boys up to the age of 21 years in such institutions.

During the years following the amendments of the Code of Criminal Procedure in 1923, the introduction of probation legislation for adult offenders on the lines of the British Probation of Offenders Act 1907, also repeatedly came under consideration.

Ultimately in 1930, the Government of British India announced its intention to do so. In 1931 an All-India Probation Bill was drafted by the British and circulated to the Provincial Governments for their review. However, the bill never became a law partly due to lack of interest on the part of the rulers and partially due to the political upheaval that the whole country was undergoing at that time.

Nevertheless, during the period 1930 to 1940, several Provinces of British India like Bengal, Bombay, Punjab, Madras, Nagpur, and the United Provinces, perhaps inspired by this draft bill, made statutory provisions for the probation system on Provincial basis.

=== The Good Conduct Prisoners Probational Release Act ===
The Government of the Punjab in 1926 passed the Good Conduct Prisoners Probational Release Act. It provided protection as well as guidance to the prisoner for his readjustment and rehabilitation in a free life. This system worked well and was adopted by the Government of West Pakistan in 1957. But its provision had a limited scope in that it failed to apply to cases involving short-term sentences, ranging from one month or less to one year.

Secondly, the provisions of the Act could be availed of only by those convicted persons who had already gone through the rigors of prison life and thus had already been tainted with the stigma of spending time in prison.

The Reclamation and Probation Department of the then West Pakistan Province prepared two draft legislations on an all-Pakistan basis to introduce the concept of probation in the country but could not introduce these laws in the Parliament for reasons best known to the then Governments.

== The Probation of Offenders Ordinance 1960 (No XLV) ==
Eventually, it was the martial law government of Ayub Khan that introduced Pakistan's first probation law in the shape of the Probation of Offenders Ordinance 1960 (No XLV) at the Federal level. The law extended to the whole of Pakistan; and was notified to come into force effective July 1, 1961 for the Province of West Pakistan. The law was the first of its kind in Pakistan, and is still in force.

The 1960 Ordinance provides for two kinds of relief for the offenders which covers juveniles as well. In the first instance, the offender could be conditionally discharged or alternatively, he or she could be released on probation.

=== Conditional Discharge ===
An order for conditional discharge could be given either after a simple due admonition, or by making an order discharging him or her subject to the condition that the offender enters into a bond, with or without sureties, for committing no offense and observing good behavior during such period not exceeding one year from the date of the order. Such an order could be made in respect of a person who had not been previously convicted, and is now convicted by the court for an offense punishable with imprisonment not exceeding two years. The court in this regard is required to look into the offender's age, character, antecedents and physical or mental condition; and the nature of the offense or any extenuating circumstances attending the commission of the offense. Before making an order for conditional discharge, the court should also explain to the offender in ordinary language that if he or she commits any offense or does not remain of good behavior during the period of conditional discharge he or she could be liable to be sentenced for the original offense. Where a person who is conditionally discharged is sentenced for the offense in respect of which the order for conditional discharge was made, that order ceases to have effect.

This provision relating to conditional discharge is useful in offenses of trivial nature or where the offense is committed under peculiar circumstances where no punishment is warranted or the crime involved is such that it is not expedient to place the person on probation or the court is of the opinion that probation would unnecessarily burden the work of a probation officer, particularly at the cost of the other probationers who deserve such handling.

While this provision permits in suitable cases the absolute discharge with admonition of an offender, it provides for other cases where the court may consider necessary in view of the circumstances of the case to bind the offender with a bond, with or without sureties, not to commit any offense and to be of good behavior during such period not exceeding a year. If the offender fails to observe any of the conditions of his or her bond, the court can issue a warrant for his or her arrest and can also summon the offender and the sureties. Upon the offender appearing in the court, the court can either remand the offender to judicial custody until the case is heard or admit him or her to bail. After hearing the case, the court can sentence the offender for the original offense; or impose upon the offender a fine not exceeding Rs 1,000.

=== Supervision of a Probation Officer ===
A court is also empowered under this law to make a probation order in certain cases. Instead of sentencing the person, the court can, for reasons recorded in writing, can place him or her under the supervision of a probation officer for a maximum period of three years and for a minimum period of one year. However, males convicted of an offense under chapters VI or VII of the Pakistan Penal Code 1860 (No XLV), or under certain specified sections of the PPC or an offense punishable with death or transportation for life; or females. convicted of an offense punishable with death are not entitled to probation under the 1960 Ordinance.

The court, however, cannot pass a probation order unless the offender enters into a bond, with or without sureties, pledging not to commit an offense and to keep the peace and be of good behavior during the period of the bond; and to appear and receive sentence if called upon to do so during that period. The court also should not pass a probation order unless it is satisfied that the offender or one of his sureties, if any, has a fixed place of abode or a regular occupation within the local limits of its jurisdiction and is likely to continue in such place of abode or such occupation, during the period of the bond.

The court can also direct that the bond should contain such conditions, as in its opinion, are necessary for securing supervision of the offender by the probation officer; and also such additional conditions with respect to residence, environment, abstention from intoxicants and any other matter which the court may, having regard to the particular circumstances of the case, consider necessary for preventing a repetition of the same offense or a commission of other offenses by the offender and for rehabilitating him as an honest, industrious and law-abiding citizen. If an offender is sentenced for the offense in respect of which a probation order was made, then the probation order ceases to have effect.

=== Age and health considerations ===
The provisions of the 1960 Ordinance do not take into consideration factors like age and health. It does not, however, mean that juvenile offenders are not entitled to probation. It simply implies that the court is not expected to take this account as a factor justifying grant of probation.

Health is excluded as a category firstly, because the lawmakers were of the opinion that the probation itself is hardly suitable to cases involving ill-health, physical or mental; and secondly because proper and elaborate medical facilities may not be available to the machinery of the probation administration in Pakistan for some time to come. However, these factors can be taken into account at the time of discharging a criminal.

In addition to discharging an offender or making a probation order the court can order the offender to pay compensation or damages for losses caused to any person by the offender. However, the amount of compensation or damages and costs so awarded should not exceed the amount of the fine which the court could have imposed in respect of the original offense committed by the offender.

=== Grave offenses not entitled to probation ===
Male persons convicted of grave offenses are not entitled to probation., like those punishable with the penalty of death or transportation for life or of heinous offenses of the nature, as described in the PPC under sections 216-A (penalty for harboring robbers or dacoits), 311 (for being a thug), 328 (theft after preparation made for causing death, hurt or restraint in order to the committing of the theft), 386-389 (putting a person in fear of injury or death in order to commit extortion, etc.), 392-402 (commitment of robbery, dacoity or belonging to gang of thieves), 413 (habitual dealing in stolen property), 455 (lurking house-trespass or house-breaking after preparation for hurt or assault, etc.), 460 (all persons jointly concerned in lurking house-trespass or house-breaking by night punishable where death or grievous hurt caused by one of them), or of serious offenses under Chapters VI (Offenses against the State) and VII (offenses relating to the Army, Navy and Air Force). This bar is introduced in the 1960 Ordinance more or less on the lines of the Good Conduct Prisoners Probational Release Act 1926, which was already in force in Pakistan when the 1960 law was introduced.

A total bar with regard to section 302 and 303 and partial bar with regard to section 307 of the PPC is also provided, as section 5 restricts the application of the Ordinance in respect of a male person convicted of an offense punishable with death or transportation for life. In fact, in the matter of offense, the scope of the Ordinance is limited to a greater degree than that of the 1926 Act in that it precludes wholesale the offenses punishable with transportation of life against the latter law which covered offenses under certain sections such as 304, 305 and 326 of the PPC.

With regard to females, no restriction is made with regard to offenses other than an offense punishable with death for availing the benefits under the Ordinance.

=== Investigation by Probation Officer ===
While considering the use of probation, the 1960 Ordinance enjoins the court to take into consideration all the pros and cons of a case and consider the version of the prosecuting agency as well as go into the report of the probation officer before taking any final decision. The reports made by the police in this respect can be a valuable guide to the court, particularly on the question of previous offenses.

However, investigation done by the probation officer is more helpful since it is expected to cover the circumstances or home surroundings of any offender with a view to assisting the court in determining the suitable methods of dealing with the offender. The probation officer's report should inform the court about the offender as an individual; about offender's family and home background, his work and capabilities, his interests and associates, his character and disposition, and his health and mental outlook. The information collected by the probation officer, however, is made available to the court only after the establishment of the guilt of the offender and cannot, therefore, affect offender's conviction; it is expected to only influence court's disposition with respect to grant of probation. The whole purpose of the investigation conducted by the officer is to strengthen the hands of the court in dealing with the individual offender, and to enable the court to know something of the offender's personality and relation to society, to consider his needs and potentialities and thus be in a position to decide as to whether it would in the offender's interest and the community's interest if the concerned individual is placed on probation.

If the court decides that a particular case is fit for probation and passes a probation order, the offender is then placed under the supervision of a probation officer. It is then for the officer to undertake the task of helping the probationer to make a success of his probation. It then becomes the concerned officer's duty to advise, assist and befriend the probationer. The officer is expected to look into the probationer's immediate material needs, such as searching for employment and accommodation for the offender. Even while the officer is attending to these needs, however, he or she should try to decide in what ways and for what reasons the probationer is maladjusted in the society. It is important for probation to succeed that the change instead of being imposed from outside come from the probationer.

During the probation period the probation officer is expected to develop a relationship with the probationer, with a view to enabling the offender to differentiate between right and wrong and to lead a useful and law-abiding life. The technique of building the relationship between the two is mainly based on the probation officer's precept and example, reinforced with his or her dynamic personality. Success consists in making the probationer look at things from a perspective which he or she was unlikely to do without the probation officer's help.

The probationer may be kept in his home during the period of probation or elsewhere in a better and healthier environment as required by the court on the merits of each case. If there are no definite directions to this effect in a particular case, this matter can be left to the discretion of the probation officer and the Probation Department. The question of engaging or employing the probationer on any congenial work or useful trade can be left to the advice and discretion of the probation officer and the Probation Department.

=== Breach of conditions ===
If a probationer breaches any of the conditions of his or her probation, but is not involved in the commission of fresh offense, three ways are open to the court:

- It can amend the probation order, insert new requirements, but not extend it beyond the statutory maximum limit of three years.

- It can punish the offender for breach of probation order by levying a fine of up to Rs 1,000; or

- If the fine is not paid within such period as fixed by the court, the offender may be sentenced for the original offense.

If the offender also commits a fresh offense, then the court, apart from sentencing the offender for the new offense, should also punish the offender for the original offense.

The 1960 Ordinance envisages that normally a probation officer should be able to report to court in about 2,000 cases a year and also to be able to supervise about 50 cases of probationers at a time and sometimes even more. When the work of any particular court is not reasonably sufficient to justify the appointment of a full-time officer, one officer can be entrusted with the task to cover two or more courts.

A probation officer is expected to investigate and report about the offense and the circumstances under which it took place together with the general conduct and character of the offender including his or her socio-economic background. This will, however, be done by the court only in the few chosen cases which will be selected for the purpose by the court.

== The Juvenile Justice System Ordinance 2000 ==
This Ordinance was introduced by the General Musharraf regime on July 1, 2000 which was repealed by virtue of Act No.XXII of 2018 namely Juvenile Justice System Act 2018 and was a pioneer law in protecting the rights of juveniles coming into conflict with law in more than one ways. Like previous law i.e JJSO 2000 this law also extends to the whole of Pakistan.

== Parole ==
In addition to the system of conditional discharge and probation envisaged under the 1960 Ordinance, there also exists the system of parole in Pakistan's judicial system. It is different from probation in that the parolees are first sent to prison and then given early release. Parolees are those who in the opinion of the jail authorities are likely to refrain from crime and lead an enterprising life. In this way they are categorized as falling into the category of those prisoners who have not formed definite criminal tendencies. They are thus placed under the supervision of a parole officer, and sent as servants to influential officers and paid meager salaries by them. In many ways, the whole system smacks of bonded labor. Generally, the parolees are seldom taught any skills to get better jobs.

Like everything associated with the prison system in the country, the system of parole and probation is in a pathetic state in Pakistan. They are run by Directors in Punjab and Sindh while in Khyber Pakhtunkhwa and Balochistan, they are headed by IG Prisons and by the Home Secretary respectively. More attention needs to be paid to this community based rehabilitation because it will prove to be less expensive.

According to one estimate, Pakistan presently is spending around Rs 800 million on prisons annually. If the probation and parole system is used constructively then the expenditure could be reduced to about Rs 70 million per year.

== Figures ==
In 2012, the numbers of prisoners released on probation were as follows:

Punjab: Juveniles - 164 Females - 350 Adult Males - 22,235

Sindh: Juveniles - 44 Females - 2 Adult Males - 695

In 2012, the numbers released on parole were as follows:

Punjab: Juveniles - 0 Females - 0 Adult Males - 327

Sindh: Juveniles - 0 Females - 0 Adult Males - 29
