= Ninth Amendment to the Constitution of Pakistan =

Amendment to the Pakistani constitution

The Ninth Amendment to the Constitution of Pakistan (Urdu: آئین پاکستان میں نویں ترمیم) would have imposed sharia law as the supreme law of the land by amending Article 2, 203B and 203D of the Constitution of Pakistan.

The Senate passed the bill and sent it to the National Assembly on 7 August 1986. Wasim Sajjad, the Minister for Justice and Parliamentary Affairs, referred the bill to committee. The committee was supposed to submit a report regarding the proposed amendment within 30 days but before the report could be presented, the National Assembly was dissolved and the bill lapsed.

== Text ==
Amendment of Article 2 of the Constitution: In the Constitution of the Islamic Republic of Pakistan, hereinafter referred to as the Constitution, in Article 2, after the word "Pakistan", at the end, the words "and the Injunctions of Islam as laid down in the Holy Quran and Sunnah shall be the supreme law and source of guidance for legislation to be administered through laws enacted by the Parliament and Provincial Assemblies, and for policy making by the Government" shall be added.

Amendment of Article 203B of the Constitution: In the Constitution, in Article 203B, in paragraph (c), (a) For the comma after the word "Constitution" a full stop shall be substituted; (b) And the words, commas and semi-colon "Muslim Personal Law, any law relating to the procedure of any Court or tribunal or, until the expiration of ten years from the commencement of this Chapter, any fiscal law or any law relating to the levy and collection of taxes and fees or banking or insurance practice and procedure; and shall be omitted.

Amendment of Article 203D of the Constitution: In the Constitution, in Article 203D, after clause (3) the following new clause shall be added namely: (3-A) Notwithstanding anything contained in this chapter, in respect of any fiscal law or any law relating to the levy and collection of taxes and fees or banking or insurance practice and procedure, the Court shall, in case of law held by it to be repugnant to the Injunctions of Islam, in consultation with persons having special knowledge of the subject, recommend to the Government specific measures and a reasonable time within which to take adequate steps and amend such law so as to bring it in conformity with the Injunctions of Islam: Provided that the decisions of the Court shall not have retrospective effect and no right or claim shall be based thereon accordingly directly or indirectly. (3-B) Notwithstanding anything contained in the Constitution including this chapter or clause (3-A) or anything done pursuant there to, or any law or any judgment of any Court to the contrary, all existing laws relating to the levy and collection of taxes and fees or banking or insurance practice and procedure which are the subject-matter of decision of the Court referred to in clause (3-A), shall continue to remain in force until such time as appropriate laws are enacted by the legislature in substitution of such existing laws as a consequence of the final decision of the Court, as stated in clause (3-A), and until the said laws have been enforced: Provided that nothing contained in clauses (3-A) and (3-B) shall apply to assessment made, orders passed, proceedings pending and amount payable or recovered before the enforcement of the laws enacted in pursuance of clause (3-A).

== See also ==
- Zia-ul-Haq's Islamization
- Separation of powers
- Nawaz Sharif
- Benazir Bhutto
- Pervez Musharraf
