= Safia Bibi rape case =

1980s rape case in Pakistan

- Location: Sahiwal, Pakistan
- Date: 1982-1983
- Attack type: Rape
- Victim: Safia Bibi
- Perpetrators: Maqsood Ahmed, Muhammad Ali

The Safia Bibi rape case involved the rape of a nearly blind teenaged girl named Safia Bibi in 1982 by her employers, in Sahiwal, Pakistan. When she was unable to prove the rape in court, she herself was charged with fornication under Pakistan's Sharia inspired Hudood Ordinances and sentenced to 3 years in jail, 15 canings and a fine.

== Incident ==
Safia Bibi, employed as a domestic help in a local landlord's house was raped by the landlord's son Maqsood Ahmed and the landlord Muhammad Ali himself. Due to the rape, she became pregnant and delivered a child which died shortly thereafter. On 15 July 1982, Safia's father reported to the local police station that his daughter had been raped by Maqsood Ahmed and Muhammad Ali and had as a result given birth to a child. Both Safia and Maqsood Ahmed were arrested after being medically examined. Her parents claimed that the rape had not been reported earlier as they were afraid of retribution and humiliation.

== Trial and sentencing ==
The case was tried in the Sessions Court of Sahiwal District, Pakistan. As per the Hudood ordnance which follows Sharia law, in order to prove the rape, would require four male witnesses as well as visual identification of the perpetrators. Safia was unable to fulfil these requirements and as a result, the perpetrators were acquitted on the very same day.

On 24 July 1983, Safia was tried and found guilty of Zina (fornication) under the Zina (extramarital) Ordinance, part of the Hudood Ordinances. She was sentenced to public lashings (15 lashes), 3 years jail and Rs 1,000 fine. The facts that she was unmarried and had herself admitted to having become pregnant due to the rape were taken as evidence against her.

== Public protests and acquittal ==
The sentencing set off a wave of protests by the public and a number of women's rights groups led by the Women's Action Forum group. A number of demonstrations were organised to raise the issue domestically as well as internationally. The case also caused international embarrassment to Pakistan when the Pakistan Ambassador to the UK was questioned by British media about the case and he had to contact back to Pakistan for an appropriate answer.

In view of the large protests and embarrassments, the Federal Shariat Court asked for the case to be transferred to itself for review. In the review, the Federal Shariat Court acquitted Safia Bibi on technical grounds. However, she had already served six months in jail and suffered 15 lashes by then.

== Aftermath ==
The case brought to the fore and created public awareness of the Sharia based Hudood Ordinances and the second class citizen position of women due to it. The international publicity served to embarrass the Pakistan government, resulting in the rumoured direct intervention by Pakistan's military ruler General Muhammad Zia-ul-Haq who ordered that the case be transferred to the Federal Shariat Court for review.

== See also ==
- Rape in Pakistan
- Hudood Ordinances
- Violence against women in Pakistan
- Women in Pakistan
- Women related laws in Pakistan
