= Islamisation in Pakistan =

Policies for revising Pakistan's political system along Islamic lines

Islamisation (Urdu: اسلامی حکمرانی) or Shariasation—i.e. the implementation of Islamic practices, laws, punishments, legal structures, textbooks, etc. into the governance, social fabric and legal framework of what had originally been a Muslim but primarily secular state—has a long history in Pakistan since the 1950s. It became the primary policy, or "centerpiece" of the government of General Muhammad Zia-ul-Haq, the ruler of Pakistan from 1977 until his death in 1988. The 1979 Hudud Ordinances were the most prominent moment of the legislation.

Zia is often identified as "the person most responsible for turning Pakistan into a global center for political Islam." Zia-ul-Haq committed himself to enforcing his interpretation of Nizam-e-Mustafa ("Rule of the prophet" Muhammad), establishing separate Shariat judicial courts and court benches to judge legal cases using Islamic doctrine. New criminal offenses (of adultery, fornication, and types of blasphemy), and new punishments (of whipping, amputation, and stoning to death), were added to Pakistani law. Interest payments for bank accounts were replaced by "profit and loss" payments. Zakat charitable donations became a 2.5% annual tax. School textbooks and libraries were overhauled to remove un-Islamic material. Offices, schools, and factories were required to provide praying space. Zia bolstered the influence of the ulama (Islamic clergy) and the Islamic parties, and conservative scholars were often on television. Tens of thousands of activists from the Jamaat-e-Islami party were appointed to government posts to ensure the continuation of his agenda after his death. Conservative ulama were added to the Council of Islamic Ideology.

The effect on Pakistan's national cohesion of state-sponsored Islamisation were mixed. In 1984 a referendum gave Zia and the Islamisation program 97.7% approval in official results. However, there have been protests against the laws and their enforcement during and after Zia's reign. Shia–Sunni religious riots broke out over differences in Islamic jurisprudence (fiqh)—in particular, over how Zakat donations would be distributed. There were also differences among Sunni Muslims. Women's and human rights groups opposed incarceration of rape victims under hadd punishments, and new laws that valued women's testimony (Law of Evidence) and blood money compensation (diyat) at half that of a man. Religious minorities and human rights groups opposed the "vaguely worded" Blasphemy Law and the "malicious abuse and arbitrary enforcement" of it.

Possible motivations for the Islamisation programme included Zia's personal piety (most accounts agree that he came from a religious family), desire to gain political allies, to "fulfill Pakistan's raison d'etre" as a Muslim state, and the political need to legitimise what was seen by some Pakistanis as his "repressive, un-representative martial law regime". Under the rule of Pervez Musharraf, the Muttahida Majlis-i-Amal (MMA), a coalition of Islamist political parties in Pakistan, called for the increased Islamisation of the government and society, specifically taking an anti-Hindu stance. The MMA led the opposition in the national assembly, held a majority in the NWFP Provincial Assembly, and was part of the ruling coalition in Balochistan.

== Background and history ==
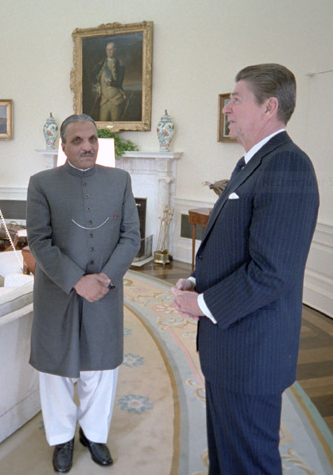
President Ronald Reagan and President Muhammad Zia-ul-Haq, 1982

Pakistan was founded on the basis of securing a sovereign homeland for the Muslims of the subcontinent to live in self-determination.

The idea of Pakistan had received overwhelming popular support among British Indian Muslims, especially those in the presidencies and provinces of British India where Muslims were in a minority such as U.P. According to some sources, the Muslim League leadership, ulama (Islamic clergy) and Muhammad Ali Jinnah had articulated their vision of Pakistan in terms of an Islamic state. Jinnah had developed a close association with the ulama. When Jinnah died, Islamic scholar Maulana Shabbir Ahmad Usmani described Jinnah as the greatest Muslim after the Mughal Emperor Aurangzeb. Usmani asked Pakistanis to remember Jinnah's message of Unity, Faith and Discipline and work to fulfil his dream:

to create a solid bloc of all Muslim states from Karachi to Ankara, from Pakistan to Morocco. He [Jinnah] wanted to see the Muslims of the world united under the banner of Islam as an effective check against the aggressive designs of their enemies.

After the creation of Pakistan in 1947 during East Pakistani language movement, many advocated to Muhammad Ali Jinnah making Arabic the state language of Pakistan as a Muslim nationalist country, which was later supported and reiterated by many, but the proposal ultimately did not gain popular support and popularity. These proposals to make Arabic the state language failed to gain substantial support in any part of Pakistan. However, as this demand is linked to the question of the development of Islamic culture, it indirectly reinforced the demand for the introduction of Arabic script in the state language Urdu and Bengali (Dobhashi) in some quarters.

Contradicting this mythology are statements by Jinnah: "... in this state of Pakistan. You may belong to any religion or caste or creed—that has nothing to do with the business of the state ... ", and by Moonis Ahmar, who writes, "in the formative phase of Pakistan, the notion of religious extremism was almost non-existent as the founder of the country, Quaid-e-Azam Mohammad Ali Jinnah, made it clear that the new state would not be theocratic in nature. However, after his demise on September 11, 1948, his successors failed to curb the forces of religious militancy ..." Rather than Islamisation being the natural evolution of what Muslims intended Pakistan to be, secularists describe it as a reaction to events of the 1970s: the traumatic breakaway of Bangladesh in 1971, the growing power of Islamic revivalism and Islamic political parties in Pakistan, leading to the declaring the Ahmadiyya Community to be non-Muslims, the banning alcohol, gambling and night clubs, and the 1977 overthrow of Zulfikar Ali Bhutto by a conservative pious Muslim, General Muhammad Zia-ul-Haq, the ruler of Pakistan until his death in 1988.

The first formal step taken to transform Pakistan into an ideological Islamic state was in March 1949 when the country's first Prime Minister, Liaquat Ali Khan, introduced the Objectives Resolution in the Constituent Assembly. The Objectives Resolution declared that sovereignty over the entire universe belongs to God Almighty. The president of the Muslim League, Chaudhry Khaliquzzaman, announced that Pakistan would bring together all Muslim countries into Islamistan - a pan-Islamic entity. Keith Callard, one of the earliest scholars on Pakistani politics, observed that Pakistanis believed in the essential unity of purpose and outlook in the Muslim world:

Pakistan was founded to advance the cause of Muslims. Other Muslims might have been expected to be sympathetic, even enthusiastic. But this assumed that other Muslim states would take the same view of the relation between religion and nationality.

However, Pakistan's pan-Islamist sentiments were not shared by other Muslim governments at the time. Nationalism in other parts of the Muslim world was based on ethnicity, language and culture. Although Muslim governments were unsympathetic with Pakistan's pan-Islamic aspirations, Islamists from all over the world were drawn to Pakistan. Figures such as the Grand Mufti of Palestine, Al-Haj Amin al-Husseini, and leaders of Islamist political movements, such as the Muslim Brotherhood, became frequent visitors to the country. After General Zia-ul-Haq took power in a military coup, Hizb ut-Tahrir (an Islamist group calling for the establishment of a caliphate) expanded its organisational network and activities in Pakistan. Its founder, Taqi al-Din al-Nabhani, would maintain regular correspondence with Abul A’la Maududi, the founder of Jamaat-e-Islami (JI), and he also urged Israr Ahmed to continue his work in Pakistan for the establishment of a global caliphate.

Social scientist Nasim Ahmad Jawed conducted a survey in 1969 in pre-divided Pakistan on the type of national identity that was used by educated professional people. He found that over 60% of people in East Pakistan (modern day Bangladesh) professed to have a secular national identity. However, in West Pakistan (current day Pakistan) the same figure professed to have an Islamic and not a secular identity. Furthermore, the same figure in East Pakistan defined their identity in terms of their ethnicity and not Islam. But it was the opposite in West Pakistan where Islam was stated to be more important than ethnicity.

After Pakistan's first ever general elections the 1973 Constitution was created by an elected Parliament. The Constitution declared Pakistan an Islamic Republic and Islam as the state religion. It also stated that all laws would have to be brought into accordance with the injunctions of Islam as laid down in the Quran and Sunnah and that no law repugnant to such injunctions could be enacted. The 1973 Constitution also created certain institutions such as the Federal Shariat Court and the Council of Islamic Ideology to channel the interpretation and application of Islam.

On 5 July 1977, General Zia-ul-Haq led a coup d'état. In the year or two before Zia-ul-Haq's coup, his predecessor, leftist Prime Minister Zulfikar Ali Bhutto, had faced vigorous opposition which was united under the revivalist banner of Nizam-e-Mustafa ("Rule of the prophet"). According to supporters of the movement, establishing an Islamic state based on sharia law would mean a return to the justice and success of the early days of Islam when the Islamic prophet Muhammad ruled the Muslims. In an effort to stem the tide of street Islamisation, Bhutto had also called for it and banned the drinking and selling of wine by Muslims, nightclubs and horse racing.

On coming to power, Zia went much further than Bhutto, committing himself to enforcing Nizam-e-Mustafa, i.e. sharia law. Most accounts confirm that Zia came from a religious family and religion played an important part in molding his personality. His father worked as a civilian official in army headquarters and was known as Maulvi Akbar Ali due to his religious devotion. Zia joined the army before partition and occasionally offended his British superiors with his refusal to give up religious and cultural traditions. Zia attributed his personal resistance to the lifestyle of the British Indian cavalry to his faith in ''God and his teachings''.

In his first televised speech to the country as head of state he declared that

Pakistan which was created in the name of Islam will continue to survive only if it sticks to Islam. That is why I consider the introduction of [an] Islamic system as an essential prerequisite for the country.

While in the past, "many a ruler did what they pleased in the name of Islam", he would not.

Unlike in Iran, Islamisation in Pakistan was politically conservative, working against, not with leftist forces and ideas. Zia had little sympathy with Bhutto or his populist, socialist philosophy—captured in the slogan, "Food, clothing, and shelter". General Zia explained in an interview:

The basis of Pakistan was Islam. ... Muslims of the subcontinent are a separate culture. It was on the Two-Nation Theory that this part was carved out of the Subcontinent as Pakistan.... Mr. Bhutto's way of flourishing in this Society was by eroding its moral fiber. ... by pitching students against teachers, children against their parents, landlord against tenants, workers against mill owners. [Pakistan has economic difficulties] because Pakistanis have been made to believe that one can earn without working. ... We are going back to Islam not by choice but by the force of circumstances. It is not I or my government that is imposing Islam. It was what 99 percent of people wanted; the street violence against Bhutto reflected the people's desire ...

While Zia initiated the Islamisation programme, he came under attack from conservative Sunni forces who considered his process too slow. He distanced himself from some of the ulama in 1980, and in 1983 religious opponents spread the rumour that Zia was an Ahmadi. Zia was "forced to deny this allegation publicly and denounce the Ahmadis as kafirs (infidels)".

In 1984 a referendum was held on Zia, the Islamisation program, and giving him a five-year presidential term. Official results reported 97.7 in favor and voter participation of 60%. Independent observers questioned whether 30% of eligible voters had voted.

Opposition to state-sponsored Islamisation or aspects of it came from several quarters. Religious riots broke out in 1983 and 1984. Sectarian divisions between Sunnis and Shia worsened over the issue of the 1979 Zakat ordinance, but differences in fiqh jurisprudence also arose in marriage and divorce, inheritance and wills and imposition of hadd punishments.

Among Sunni Muslims, there were disputes between Deobandis and Barelvis. Zia favored Deobandi doctrine. So the Sufi pirs of Sindh (who were Barelvi) joined the anti-Zia Movement for the Restoration of Democracy.

From its inception, Pakistani leaders have leveraged religious sentiments as a means to fortify the nation's identity. This approach resulted in the promotion of Islamisation, which fostered an educational system churning out millions of religious students annually. Unfortunately, this policy has often been associated with sympathies toward extremism, violence, and the encouragement of religious and communal divides.

== Hudud Ordinance ==
One of the first and most controversial Islamisation measures was the replacement of parts of the Pakistan Penal Code (PPC) with the 1979 "Hudud Ordinance". (Hudud meaning limits or restrictions, as in limits of acceptable behavior in Islamic law.) The Ordinance added new criminal offenses of adultery and fornication to Pakistani law, and new punishments of whipping, amputation, and stoning to death.

For theft or robbery, the PPC punishments of imprisonment or fine, or both, were replaced by amputation of the right hand of the offender for theft, and amputation of the right hand and left foot for robbery. For Zina (extramarital sex) the provisions relating to adultery were replaced by the Ordinance with punishments of flogged 100 lashes for those unmarried offenders and stoning to death for married offenders.

All these Hudud punishments were the maximum punishments, dependent on Hudd proof—four Muslim men of good repute testifying as witness to the crime—being met. In practice, as of 2014, the Hudd requirement has not yet been met and no offender has been stoned or had limbs amputated by the Pakistani judicial system. The less strict tazir standards—where the punishment was some combination of imprisonment, fines and/or flogging—was applied and many offenders have been publicly flogged.

More worrisome for human rights and women's rights advocates, some lawyers and politicians, was the incarceration of thousands of rape victims on charges of zina. Mixing the Pakistan penal code with Islamic laws was difficult because of the difference in the underlying logic of the two legal systems.

=== Prohibition Order ===
Drinking of wine (and all other alcoholic drinks) was not a crime under the original Pakistan Penal Code, but in 1977, the drinking and selling of wine by Muslims was banned in Pakistan, punishable by imprisonment of six months or a fine of Rs. 5000, or both. Under Zia's Prohibition Order, this punishment was replaced by one of whipping of eighty stripes, (citing an Ijma (consensus opinion) of the Companions of Muhammad since the period of the Second Caliph Umar). Non-Muslims were excepted if they obtained a license to drink and/or manufacture alcoholic beverages from the Government.

=== Adultery (Zina) Ordinance ===
The most controversial of the ordinances was the Zina Ordinance, by which the Pakistan Penal Code provisions relating to adultery were replaced. Women and men found guilty were to be flogged a hundred stripes apiece if unmarried, and stoned to death if married. Uncorroborated testimony by women was inadmissible in Hudud crimes, so in cases of rape, victims were sometimes charged with fornication and jailed and their rapists were freed because the women could not comply with the Islamic Hadd requirements of four reputable Muslim males testifying to the crime. Girls as young as twelve were also sometimes jailed and prosecuted for having extra-marital intercourse because the ordinance abolished Pakistan's statutory rape law.

According to legal scholar Martin Lau:

While it was easy to file a case against a woman accusing her of adultery, the Zina Ordinance made it very difficult for a woman to obtain bail pending trial. Worse, in actual practice, the vast majority of accused women were found guilty by the trial court only to be acquitted on appeal to the Federal Shariat Court. By then they had spent many years in jail, were ostracised by their families, and had become social outcasts.

In 1979, before the ordinances went into effect there were 70 women held in Pakistani prisons. By 1988, there were 6000. Critics complained that the law had become a way for "vengeful husbands and parents" to punish their wives or daughters for "disobedience", but that "whenever even small changes" were proposed, religious groups and political parties staged "large scale demonstrations" in opposition.

Pakistani women's and human rights groups protested the law, and international media gave it publicity. Supporters defended the Ordinances' punishments as ordained by God and the law as the victim of "extremely unjust propaganda" in the media.

The first conviction and sentence of stoning to death, in September 1981, was overturned under national and international pressure. A conviction for adultery of a 13-year-old blind girl, (Safia Bibi), who alleged rape by her employer and his son, was reversed and the conviction was set aside on appeal after bitter public criticism. Another conviction for zina and sentence of stoning to death in early 1988 sparked more public outrage and led to a retrial and acquittal by the Federal Sharia Court.

Attention to the barbarity of the Ordinance and suggestions for revising it were given by a number of government appointed commissions and a televised several weeks-long-televised debate on the subject. In 2006, parts of the law were extensively revised by the Women's Protection Bill.

== Sharia courts and constitutional amendments ==
In 1978 Zia established "Shariat Appellate Benches", grafted on to Pakistan's four High Courts. The benches were tasked with judging legal cases using the teachings of the Qur'an and the Sunnah and examining the country's laws to determine whether they complied with sharia law, and bring them into alignment if they did not. A Shariat Appellate Bench of the Supreme Court was created to be the final authority in Sharia cases.

In announcing the establishment of Shariat Benches, Zia described their jurisdiction:

"Every citizen will have the right to present any law enforced by the government before the 'Sharia Bench' and obtain its verdict whether the law is wholly or partly Islamic or un-Islamic."

However, some very important laws were exempt from being struck down as un-Islamic.

The Ninth Amendment to the Pakistan Constitution, added by Zia's government, stated that "the Injunctions of Islam as laid down in the Holy Quran and Sunnah shall be the supreme law and source of guidance for legislation", but qualified that in Article 203-B by omitting from the rule: the constitution, "Muslim Personal Law, any law relating to the procedure of any Court or tribunal", and "until the expiration of ten years from the commencement of this Chapter, any fiscal law or any law relating to the levy and collection of taxes and fees or banking or insurance practice and procedure..." Thus the constitution and major parts of Pakistan's laws were exempt from Sharia jurisdiction. Further, the Shariat Benches did not always follow Zia's policy, and early on declared rajm, or stoning, to be un-Islamic. Zia-ul-Haq reconstituted the court, which then ruled rajm Islamic.

In 1980 the Shariat Appellate Benches were disbanded and replaced by a Federal Shariat Court (FSC). Its establishment was less than clean and simple, as between 1980 and 1985, "provisions relating to the FSC's operation were modified 28 times, through the mechanism of 12 separate presidential ordinances and were incorporated into the Constitution in 14 subsections covering 11 pages of text." It has eight judges appointed by the president, "selected for the most part from judges of the high courts".

The judges of the superior courts appointed by General Zia tended to be "Islamic moderates" rather than "Islamic activists" favoring a rapid advance of Islamisation.

In the lower district courts, there is "considerable variation in the enforcement and interpretation of the Hudud laws", with "much more enthusiasm" for implementation of them in the Punjab and urban Khyber Pakhtunkhwa (formerly NWFP) than in other regions.

== Blasphemy laws ==
To outlaw blasphemy, the Pakistan Penal Code (PPC) and the Criminal Procedure Code (CrPC) were amended through ordinances in 1980, 1982 and 1986.

- The 1980 law prohibited derogatory remarks against Islamic personages, and carried a three-year prison sentence.
- In 1982 the small Ahmadiyya religious minority were prohibited from saying or implying they were Muslims.
- In 1986 declaring anything that implied disrespect to the Islamic prophet Muhammad, Ahl al-Bayt (family members of Muhammad), Sahabah (companions of Muhammad) or Sha'ar-i-Islam (Islamic symbols), was made a cognisable offence, punishable with imprisonment or fine, or both.

=== Religious offences and punishments ===
PPC	Section	Description	Penalty
298		Uttering of any word or making any sound or making any gesture or placing of any object in the sight with the deliberate intention of wounding the religious feelings of any person.	1 years imprisonment, or fine, or both
298	A	Use of derogatory remarks etc., in respect of holy personages. (1980)	3 years imprisonment, or fine, or both
298	B	(Ahmadi blasphemy law) Misuse of epithets, descriptions and titles etc., reserved for certain holy personages or places, by Ahmadis. (26 April 1984)	3 years imprisonment and fine
298	C	(Ahmadi blasphemy law) AKA Ordinance XX: An Ahmadi, calling himself a Muslim, or preaching or propagating his faith, or outraging the religious feelings of Muslims, or posing himself as a Muslim. (26 April 1984)	3 years imprisonment and fine
295		Injuring or defiling places of worship, with intent to insult the religion of any class	Up to 2 years imprisonment or with fine, or with both
295	A	Deliberate and malicious acts intended to outrage religious feelings of any class by insulting its religion or religious beliefs. (1927)	Up to 10 years imprisonment, or with fine, or with both
295	B	Defiling, etc., of Quran. (1982)	Imprisonment for life
295	C	Use of derogatory remarks, spoken, written, directly or indirectly, etc. to defile the name of Muhammad. (1986)	Mandatory death and fine (Feb. 1990)

The legal language forbidding of blasphemy is quite complete, stating

Whoever, with the deliberate intention of wounding the religious feelings of any person, utters any word or makes any sound in the hearing of that person or makes any gesture in the sight of that person or places any object in the sight of that person, shall be punished with imprisonment of either description for a term which may extend to one year, or with fine, or with both.

Prior to 1986, only 14 cases pertaining to blasphemy were reported in Pakistan. From 1987 to 2014 over 1300 people have been accused of blasphemy, mostly non-Muslim religious minorities. The vast majority of the accusations were lodged for desecration of the Quran.

The laws are controversial among the small liberal community in Pakistan and international human rights organisations. According to one religious minority source, an accusation of blasphemy commonly subjects the accused, police, lawyers, and judges to harassment, threats, attacks and rioting. Critics complain that Pakistan's blasphemy law "is overwhelmingly being used to persecute religious minorities and settle personal vendettas", but calls for change in the blasphemy laws have been strongly resisted by Islamic parties. As of 2014 no one has been legally executed for blasphemy, but 17 people are on death row for the crime, and a considerable number of those accused of or connected with the issue have been killed at the hands of mob or other vigilante violence. Pakistan's blasphemy laws impose the possibility of a death penalty upon those who offend Islam, a measure that has drawn criticism for its alleged misuse in the persecution of religious minorities and the unjust targeting of minority communities.

Over 50 people accused of blasphemy have been murdered before their respective trials were over, and prominent figures who opposed blasphemy laws (Salman Taseer, the former governor of Punjab, and Shahbaz Bhatti, the Federal Minister for Minorities) have been assassinated after urging reform of the law. Altogether, since 1990, 62 people have been murdered as a result of blasphemy allegations. There has also been at least one case of an attack on a non-Muslim faith registered under the blasphemy laws.

The depth of passion and vigour of vigilantism against blasphemy was in evidence in a 21 April 1994 incident in Gujranwala where a doctor, Sajjad Farooq, was beaten, stoned, doused with kerosene and set alight, and dragged through the streets tied to a motorbike by a group of people after an announcement was made over the loudspeakers of several local mosques that "a Christian had burned a copy of the Koran" and that people should come forward to stone him to death. It later transpired that Farooq was not a Christian but a devout Muslim, but one with enemies with access to local mosque public address systems. As of late 1994, a complaint had been lodged against five people but no arrests appeared to have been made.

== Economic Islamisation ==
=== Zakat and Ushr Ordinance ===
In the short term, the fiscal dimension of the Islamisation policy made a stronger impact. Payment of the alms tax, zakat, as well as its agricultural counterpart, Ushr, were traditionally private obligations for Muslims in Pakistan. Together they generally represented 2.5% of annual household savings and served as a sort of wealth tax to be redistributed to the Muslim community's poor. One of the provisions of the 1973 constitution already stipulated that these taxes should be collected by the government. But Bhutto had made no move to implement it. In 1979, Zia decided to transform what was considered a personal duty of solidarity into a legal obligation. The "Zakat and Ushr Ordinance" was issued on 20 June 1980. Its urban component, zakat, took effect in 1981, whereas ushr did not come into effect until 1983. The system by which these taxes were previously levied was replaced by a specific agency to rationalise the collection and distribution of funds, a process that Malik describes as follows:

On the first day of the fasting month of Ramadan, the Zakat Deducting Agencies (banks, post-offices etc.) by means of deduction at source withdraw 2.5% from all saving accounts above a certain exemption limit (fixed at Rs. 1,000 in the first year of Zakat deduction, 1980). They transfer the zakat thus collected to the Central Zakat Fund (CZF). This fund is fed also with proceeds from 'voluntary Zakat' and 'donations' and from funds of other institutions. Following certain criteria, the Zakat is then distributed among the Provincial Zakat Funds (PZFs) and the National Zakat Foundation (NZF). Following prescribed quota, the PZFs turn over funds to the Local Zakat Funds (LZFs), to other institutions, to the needy (mustaqhin) and to the National Zakat Foundation.

While ushr is distributed in the locality where it was collected, the distribution process of the zakat shows a whole bureaucratic pyramid in action. Here again, the Islamisation policy reinforced state control over religious institutions. Further evidence of this was the Tehsil/Taluka/Subdivisional and Local Committees (Removal of chairman and Members) Rule (1981), which allowed the state to dismiss the president of a local Zakat Committee, an institution that was previously independent of the state. In 1981, Al Zakat, an influential national monthly publication boasted that 250,000 persons were involved in the new system of collecting and distributing zakat funds. The fiscal dimension of Zia's Islamisation policy fostered a rise in sectarianism, a term that in Pakistan denotes the conflict between Sunni and Shia Muslims. As soon as Zia's plans for zakat and ushr were made public, Shia leaders objected that according to their jurisprudence of their sect, payment of these taxes was a purely individual choice, a decision made according to one's conscience. In reaction to the promulgation of the law, they orchestrated a massive demonstration in Islamabad which later led them to be exempted from the mandatory tax. The taxes have not been found to have eliminated rural and urban poverty or reduced the inequalities in wealth which had become a traditional feature of Pakistani society.

=== Riba ===
Zia publicly stated his desire to eliminate interest on loans and securities and create an "interest-free economy". Zia declared that effective 1 July 1979 the affairs of the National Investment Trust, the House Building Finance Corporation, and the Investment Corporation of Pakistan were to be run on an interest-free basis through the adoption of profit-loss sharing (PLS). On 1 January 1980, approximately 7,000 interest-free counters were opened at all the nationalised commercial banks.

In 1981 interest payments were to be replaced by "profit and loss" accounts (though profit was thought to be simply interest by another name). The government introduced and encouraged banks to adopt financing schemes based upon murabaha or musharaka.

=== Land reforms ===
Zia did not consider land reform or trade union activity to be part of Islamic economics. In a statement addressed to the poor and working class he opined:

It is not for the employers to provide roti, kapda, aur makaan (bread, clothes and homes) [a reference to a well-known slogan used by Bhutto's PPP]. It was for God Almighty who is the provider of livelihood to his people. Trust in God and He will bestow upon you an abundance of good things in life.

His martial law government also made it clear that it "was not committed to redistributive agrarian policies and described the land reforms as ordinary politics to reward supporters and punish enemies".

When, on 13 December 1980, the Federal Shariat Court declared the land reforms of 1972 and 1977 to be in consonance with Islamic injunctions, Zia responded by inducting three members of the Ulema into the Federal Sharia Court and two into the Sharia Appellate Bench of the Supreme Court (Ulema traditionally often coming from, or at least supporting the interests of, the landowning class). The newly constituted courts reversed the FSC judgment in 1990.

After the imposition of martial law, thousands of tenants were forcibly evicted from the land in various districts.

Another source, scholar Charles H. Kennedy, states that from 1978 to 1992, the "Islamic Courts" established by Islamisation (i.e. the Shariah Appellate Bench and Federal Shariat Court) were much more important in land reform policy than either the executive or legislature of Pakistan. Kennedy states they effectively "suspended implementation" of the land reforms, "repealed the reforms, drafted new legislation, and then interpreted the new laws' meanings".

=== Worker protests ===
Trade union and grass roots demands for higher wages, better working conditions, social security, old age benefits and compensation for accidents, were "no justification for protests and strikes", and treated as disorder to be suppressed. Maximum punishment to the offenders was three years rigorous imprisonment and/or whipping. On 2 January 1986 police killed 19 striking workers of the Colony Textile Mill in Multan, whose management had sought assistance from the authorities.

== Other Sharia laws ==
Attempts were made to enforce praying of salat five times a day.

Separate electorates for Hindus and Christians were established in 1985—a policy originally proposed by Islamist leader Abul A'la Maududi. Christian and Hindu leaders complained that they felt excluded from country's political process, but the policy had strong support from Islamists.

=== Qisas and Diyat Ordinance 1990 ===
In 1990 Criminal Law (Second Amendment) Ordinance on Qisas (retaliation or revenge) and Diyat (financial compensation paid to the heirs of a victim), was introduced after the Shariat Appellate Bench of the Supreme Court declared that the lack of Qisas and Diyat were repugnant to the injunctions of Islam as laid down by the Quran and Sunnah. (These laws were introduced after Zia died, but by a court—Shariat Appellate Bench of the Supreme Court—that Zia had created.)

Under the law, the victim (or heirs of the victim) of a crime had the right to inflict injuries on the offender identical to the ones sustained by the victim. (Although the ordinance set the blood money compensation for a female victim at half that for a male.) The law also allows offenders to absolve themselves of the crime by paying compensation to the victim or their heirs if, and only if, the family of the victim is willing to accept it.

Law of Evidence

A proposed Law of Evidence (Qanun-e-Shahadat) would require two women to testify in place of one man. After protest and demonstrations against the law, a 1984 compromise limited the rule to financial transactions. According to Charles Kennedy, it is unlikely that the law will affect any case brought to any superior court in Pakistan because "in practice, virtually every financial transaction in Pakistan by custom or rule requires the countersignature of several individuals".

Unlike men, women entering into legal contracts were required to have their signature witnessed by another person.

Prayer timings

Instructions were issued for regular observance of prayers and arrangements were made for performing noon prayer (Salat al-Zuhur) in government and quasi-government offices and educational institutions, during office hours, and official functions, and at airports, railway stations and bus stops.

Ramadan Ordinance

An Ehtram-e-Ramazan (reverence for fasting) Ordinance was issued banning eating, smoking, and drinking in public places in the holy month of Ramadan. According to a clause of this ordinance, those places including restaurants, canteens, bridges, lanes, and even the confines of private homes. While in theory the non-Muslim minority of Pakistan is exempt from the law, minorities have been arrested for eating in public.

Regulations for women

Under Zia, the order for women to cover their heads while in public was implemented in public schools, colleges and state television. Women's participation in sports and the performing arts was severely restricted.

The Ansari commission, which from the 1980s onwards advised the President on un-Islamic social conventions, recommended that women should be prohibited from leaving the country without a male escort and that unmarried, unaccompanied women should not be allowed to serve overseas in the diplomatic corps. An Islamic dress code was imposed on women in the public eye such as newsreaders and air stewardesses.

== Other policies ==
Textbooks were overhauled to remove un-Islamic material, and un-Islamic books were removed from libraries. Offices, schools, and factories were required to offer praying space; conservative scholars became fixtures on television. The Government built mosques in rural areas, giving the rural people greater access to mullahs. It also appointed many mullahs to advisory groups.

According to Pervez Hoodbhoy, a Pakistani physicist opposed to fundamentalism, under Zia the government organised international conferences and provided funding for research on such topics as the temperature of hell and the chemical nature of jinn (supernatural creatures made from fire).

In prisons, religious instruction is mandatory. Those who can demonstrate their ability to recite the Quran from memory before an examination board are entitled to a remission in their sentence of up to two years.

=== Madrassa expansions ===
Educational reforms partly flowed from judicial reforms insofar as, for instance, a sharia department was set up at Quaid-e-Azam University in 1979 to train Islamic legal specialists. But Zia devoted personal attention to the reorganisation of Quranic schools (dini madaris, plural of madrasssa). Madrassass (traditional religious schools) in Pakistan received state sponsorship for the first time. Their number grew from 893 to 2,801 during the Zia years according to one source. Another states that 12,000 were opened from 1983 to 1984. Most were Deobandi in doctrinal orientation, while one quarter of them were Barelvi. They received funding from Zakat councils and provided free religious training, room and board to impoverished Pakistanis. The schools, which banned televisions and radios, have been criticised by authors for stoking sectarian hatred both between Muslim sects and against non-Muslims.

=== Cultural policies ===
In a 1979 address to the nation, Zia decried the influence of Western culture and music in the country. Soon afterwards, PTV, the national television network, ceased playing music videos or any music other than patriotic songs. Most of the cinemas in Lahore were shut down. (As of 2004, the "Lollywood" film industry of Pakistan produces around 40 films a year, compared to India's thousand or so releases.)

This was despite warm relations between Zia and the President of the largest Western country (US President Ronald Reagan), and strong support for Zia from that country. Also ironic was that under Zia's rule (according to leftist cultural critic Nadeem F. Paracha), economic prosperity expanded the country's urban middle and lower-middle-classes, and spread the popularity of Western 1980s fashion wear, hairstyle and pop music.

The common South Asian parting phrase "Khuda Hafiz" was discouraged in favour of "Allah Hafiz", which was first used in 1985 in the state-run media as it was said to be more Islamic than the former phrase that allowed for religious pluralism.

== Causes, criticism and sectarian division ==
Zia's motivation for the Islamisation programme has been described as including his personal piety, desire "to fulfil Pakistan's raison d'etre" as a Muslim state, and the political need to legitimise what was seen by many as Zia's "repressive, un-representative martial law regime". Zia had come to power overthrowing Bhutto, whose opposition had been united around the slogan of Nizam-e-Mustafa (Islamic rule), making supporters of Islamisation the enemy of Zia's enemy.

Secular and leftist forces accused Zia of manipulating Islam for political ends. Nusrat Bhutto, former wife of Zulfikar Ali Bhutto claimed that Zia "used Islam" to ensure "the survival of his own regime" following the "horrors of 1971 war" in East Bengal.

One author points out that Zia was conspicuously silent on the dispute between the heterodox Zikri sect and the Ulama in Balochistan, where Islamist doctrine would call for siding with the conservative Ulama, but where Zia had a political need for tranquility among the Zikri. Another notes Zia's use of Article 203-B to protect any part of the constitution, any Personal Laws, and any financial laws from being struck down as in violation of sharia law.

=== Sectarian division ===
How much success Zia had using state-sponsored Islamisation to strengthen national cohesion is also disputed. The Shia Muslim minority differed with Sunnis over Islamic jurisprudence (fiqh), maintaining that Zia's Islamisation was actually "Sunnification". The Pakistani government leaned in favour of applying Sunni law to all.

In particular, dispute over how Zakat donations for the poor should be distributed fanned sectarian tension and religious riots broke out in 1983 and 1984. Shia were exempt from the Zakat tax on the grounds that they would contribute to their own Shia ulama for charitable work. But this exemption "led more and more Pakistanis to declare themselves as Shi’is" and this phenomenon "had the effect of hardening anti-Shi’i attitudes among Sunni Islamic activists."

Differences in fiqh jurisprudence also arose in marriage and divorce, inheritance and wills and imposition of hadd punishments.

Zia pursued anti-Shia policies and attacks on Shias also increased under his presidency, with the first major sectarian riots in Pakistan breaking out in 1983 in Karachi and later spreading to Lahore and Balochistan. Sectarian violence became a recurring feature of the Muharram month every year, with sectarian violence between Sunnis and Shias taking place in 1986 in Parachinar. In one notorious incident, the 1988 Gilgit Massacre, Osama bin Laden-led Sunni tribals assaulted, massacred and raped Shia civilians in Gilgit after being inducted by the Pakistan Army to quell a Shia uprising in Gilgit.

Among Sunni Muslims, Deobandis and Barelvis also had disputes. Zia favored Deobandi doctrine. This caused the Sufi pirs of Sindh (who were Barelvi) joined the anti-Zia Movement for the Restoration of Democracy.

A solid majority of Barelvis had supported the creation of Pakistan, and Barelvi ulama had also issued fatwas in support of the Pakistan Movement during the 1946 elections, but Islamic policies in Pakistan was mostly in favour of Deobandi (and later Ahl-e-Hadith) institutions. This was despite the fact that the majority of Deobandi clerics had strongly opposed the partition of colonial India and only a few (although influential) Deobandi clerics had supported the Pakistan Movement. Zia had forged a strong alliance between the army and Deobandi institutions.

The Qadyanis, whose members include "many leading scientists and professionals,"complained that under Zia, they have been "removed from jobs and that their property and mosques have been seized." The Qadyanis, differ from Muslims in that they do not regard Muhammad as the last prophet.

=== Women's dissent ===
Women's groups (All Pakistan Women's Association and Women's Action Forum) opposed the Diyat Ordinance (which set the "blood money" compensation for a female victim at half that for a male), and later the proposed Law of Evidence (which required two women to testify in place of one man). They challenged the law on an Islamic basis, offering an alternative interpretation of the Quranic ayah (verse) used as the basis of the law, emphasising that in other ayah, men and women are assumed to be equal, and noting the importance of the importance of the testimony of two of Muhammad's wives, (Khadija and Aisha) in early Muslim history. Despite their pious rebuttal, the protesters were met with tear gas by police outside the High Court building.

Internationally, Human Rights Watch complained that the exclusion of women's testimony in rape cases (from Hudud Ordinances (1979), as well as the Law of Evidence and proposed laws regarding Qisas and Diyat, relegated women to "inferior legal status" to men.

=== Support ===
Anis Ahmad of the International Islamic University credits controversy over the "fundamentalism" of Islamisation to the failure of "Muslim elites" to understand "the very nature of divinely revealed law." He believes these elites have adopted the "intellectual culture and political system" of the British colonisers due to which they have used a "sociological approach" to understanding Sharia law, and to assert that Islamic punishments such as amputation, stoning and lashing are "bedouin", "tribal", "premodern", "harsh", "outdated" and "barbaric." He goes on to contend that unlike Sharia, secularism calls for leniency towards the criminal, ignoring the suffering of the victim of crime. He believes that sexual indulgence is not a matter of personal freedom but "rebellion against the established moral norms in a society", that application of Sharia to non-Muslims is simply a matter of trying to "persuade them to act rationally" and that criticism of the treatment of the Ahmadiyya community has been made based on the Munir Report which has been "condemned by the ulama... as a biased work." Ahmad calls for development of educational institutions to include adequate information on current issues so that ijtihad can be exercised in social, political, economic and legal areas and believes that while Zia and other politicians may be criticised for "piecemeal and at times frivolous" implementation, the "Islamic ideals" of Islamisation have "the commitment" of the Muslim people in Pakistan.

== Legacy ==
Islamisation has been harshly criticised. Author Ian Talbot has accused it of appearing "to have reduced a great faith tradition, rich in humanity, culture and a sense of social justice, to a system of punishments and persecution of minority groups." Author Zafar Iqbal Kalanauri suggests that Zia's interpretation of Islam may have "contributed to the rise of fundamentalism, obscurantism and retrogression" in Pakistan. Another authority on the topic, Christophe Jaffrelot attributes the rise of Islamic movements including the Lashkar-e-Taiba as an 'unintended consequence of the policy of Islamisation and support for Jihad movements' undertaken by Pakistani authorities since Zia. A blurb for a book of essays on The Islamization of Pakistan, 1979-2009 published by the Middle East Institute, sums up the 30 year impact of Islamisation beginning with Zia as, "a country's founding creed violated, much of its resources misspent, and its social fabric rent". Under Zia stricter Islamic rules did not appear to lead to greater social tranquility. Crime, drinking, drug addiction are thought to have increased.

Others, at least writing in the 1980s and 1990, thought the impact of the process was overstated. In 1986 New York Times journalist Steven Wiesman wrote that religious and political leaders agreed that Islamisation changes were "largely marginal or cosmetic." Academic Charles H. Kennedy, wrote in the mid-1990s that while during the Zia administration "hardly a day passed in which one or more of the issues of the program were not the focus of political debate in Pakistan," the process had relatively small impact, as policies were "already in place", "cosmetic", or were "left unimplemented". Kennedy's explanation for why the rhetoric on Islamisation would be so extravagant while the reality was so modest is that both proponents and opponents had incentives to exaggerate its scope and impact—doing so would rally their respective political bases of support. On the other hand, the "insiders" responsible for a functioning state, who implemented Islamisation had (and have) an incentive to preserve stability and order and make sure Islamisation took place in an "ordered and prudent" (and cautious) manner. Exaggeration by enemies of Islamisation in the media and opposition (e.g. Benazir Bhutto) were not censored or even contested by the government or government bureaucracy, as they "proved" to Islamic activists on the other side of the issue that the "government was enthusiastically implementing Nizam-e-Mustapha". Lacking in depth and homegrown knowledge of Pakistan, the foreign press accepted these reports.

According to Zafar Iqbal Kalanauri, the law under Zia is unstable. It has frequently changed or threatened to change because of differences of opinion among the ruling factions. There are inconsistencies

- Between legal norms and socially observed norms;
- Between statutory legal norms and the norms applied in practice in the courts (e.g. Hadd is difficult to implement because confession, retraction of confession and strict standards of proof make it difficult to execute);
- Between different formal legal norms (e.g. non-compliance with the Muslim Family Laws Ordinance is tolerated by the courts but should be strictly punished under the Zina Ordinance). Another example of this contradiction is that the constitution assures women equal status on the one hand but, on the other hand, they are greatly discriminated in criminal law.

== Post-Zia-ul-Haq Islamisation ==
After the death of Zia, Benazir Bhutto, the daughter of Zulfikar Ali Bhutto, the Prime Minister he had overthrown and executed—was elected Prime Minister. Although she was an outspoken opponent of Zia's Islamisation, she did not dismantle the Federal Shariat Court, the Shariat Appellate Bench of the Supreme Court, nor repeal the Hudud and Ramazan Ordinances. She did, however, release all women convict prisoners in Pakistan not convicted of murder (most of whom were in prison because of the Hudud Ordinances), as one of her first acts after assuming power, and generally practiced "bureaucratic neglect" of the Islamisation apparatus.

In October 1990, the Qisas and Diyat Ordinance (QDO) was introduced by then President Ghulam Ishaq Khan. In 1997 during the government of Nawaz Sharif, the Qisas and Diyat Ordinance, now covering all offenses against human body, became an Act of the Parliament. As a consequence, crimes affecting human body in Pakistan are no longer considered offences "against the society or state", but "against an individual". Thus, if the victim or its family so decide, offenders "can walk free even after committing" murder.

In 1996 the Abolition of Whipping Act (passed by Benazir Bhutto's Pakistan People's Party), forbade sentences/punishments of whipping offenders except when imposed as a hadd punishment. This law has "greatly reduced" the instances of corporal punishment.

To lift the restrictions on jurisdiction of Shariat, an "Enforcement of Sharia Act" first promulgated by Zia in 1988 but not passed by parliament (and so allowed to expire under Benazir Bhutto), was voted into law by parliament under Nawaz Sharif's government in 1991. The law gave jurisdiction to Sharia-related cases to the Federal Shariat Court, rather than the less Islamically activist-inclined High Courts. But whether the law had more political impact than legal is debated because it kept in place a limited standard of Supremacy of Sharia. The standard of interpretation for superior courts allowed only rulings "consistent with Islamic principles of jurisprudence" when "more than one interpretation" of the law "is possible."

=== Court decisions ===
In the absence of strong political leadership or social consensus after Zia's death, superior courts have been a major, some (Charles Kennedy) say the "real" determinant of the "content and pace of Islamic reform", through their interpretation of their jurisdiction to consider what laws and actions are "repugnant to Islam". Another scholar (Martin Lau) calls Islamisation process in Pakistan largely "judge-led".

One roadblock in the way of striking down laws that activists felt were unIslamic was the lack of supremacy of shariat in the constitution. Activists had tried to use the Objectives Resolution with its principle that "Muslims shall be enabled to order their lives in the individual and collective spheres in accordance with the teachings and requirements of Islam as set out in the Holy Quran and Sunnah," but the resolution was originally part of the preamble of the constitution, rather than in the constitution itself, and as a result a 1973 ruling had declared it to "not have same status or authority" as the "normal written constitution". In 1985, the constitution was amended and the Objectives Resolution became article 2-A of the "restored constitution". With this change, Dr. Tanzil-ur-Rahman—a particularly "skillful" Islamic activist and judicial activist—argued that ordering Muslims' lives "in accordance with the teachings and requirements of Islam as set out in the Holy Quran and Sunnah," as specified in article 2A was a "supra-Constitutional" grund norm of law in Pakistan. Supporting Tanzil-ur-Rahman interpretation were several decisions handed down in the late 1980s and early 1990s declaring repugnant to Islam such things as the payment of court fees, interest on loans, or investments with a fixed rate of return, the requirement that divorce decrees needed to be recorded by family court to be valid.

The Supreme Court addressed several important issues pertaining to Islamisation around this time period (during Benazir's time in office), including decisions that found unIslamic provisions in the Pakistan Penal Code pertaining to murder, manslaughter and other forms of bodily hurt, and in most of Zulfikar Ali Bhutto's land reforms of 1972 and 1977 (ruling for example that Islam does not countenance compulsory redistribution of wealth or land for the purpose of alleviating poverty, however laudable the goal of poverty relief may be.)

However bank interest still had not been banned in Pakistan curse to Article 203-B of the constitution (mentioned above) which exempted laws dealing with finance from subordination to the sharia. To remedy this situation Islamic activists strove to convince the public with numerous conferences and copious literature that an interest-free economy as viable and religiously necessary, to pass a bill in parliament making shariat "superordinate" to the constitution, and to encourage superior courts to expand their definitions of jurisdiction of shariat.

Faisal Case

In 1990, Tanzil-ur-Rehman was appointed to the Federal Sharia Court and about a year later (November 1991) issued a "monumental decision" (Faisal vs. Secretary, Ministry of Law) that appeared as though it might put an end to interest-bearing loans and accounts in Pakistan.

The Faisal decision forbade riba absolutely without exceptions, overturning 20 federal and provincial financial laws as repugnant to Islam. It defined riba as "any addition, however slight, over and above the principal", including any system of markup, any indexing for inflation, payment by value rather than kind. It forbade riba in "production loans" as well as "consumptive" loans. It specifically declared invalid two Islamic Modernist interpretations that avoided strict prohibition: considering anti-riba Quranic verses (2:275-8) allegorical, and use of ijtihad (independent reasoning) of the issue based on ascertaining the public good (maslaha).

After much stalling by the government and bureaucracy, the Faisal case was upheld in 1999 by the Shariah Appellate Bench in the "Aslam Khaki" decision, with detailed orders to start the interest free economy. Pleading that implementation of the judgment would "create enormous problems" for Pakistan's economy by hurting the domestic western-style banking industry and Pakistan's "financial dealings with the outside world", the government was given an additional year by the court to Islamise by the Bench.

By this time, however, Pervez Musharraf had come to power in a coup and limited the power of the courts. Two justices of the Shariah Appellate Bench resigned rather than take a new oath of office, and a new appeal with new judges found many "errors" in the Aslam Khaki case and overturned the ruling of a couple months earlier.

=== Protection of Women Act ===
After 2001, attention to revise Hudud Ordinance was given by a number of government appointed commissions, a televised several weeks-long-televised debate on the subject In 2006, then President Pervez Musharraf proposed reform of the ordinance, and in November/December the "Protection of Women (Criminal Laws Amendment) Act" was passed and signed. The bill retained only Adultery in the Zina Ordinance, allowing rape to be prosecutable under civil law. It prevents unsuccessful complaints of adultery or rape from being converted into charges of fornication, and adds to the Pakistan Penal Code a new offense of false accusation of fornication.

=== Public support ===
Islamisation has strong public support in Pakistan. According to Shajeel Zaidi, a million people attended Zia's funeral because he had given them what they wanted: more religion. A PEW opinion poll found that 84% of Pakistanis favoured making Sharia the official law of the land. According to the 2013 Pew Research Center report, the majority of Pakistani Muslims also support the death penalty for those who leave Islam (62%). In contrast, support for the death penalty for those who leave Islam was only 36% in fellow South Asian Muslim country Bangladesh (which shared heritage with Pakistan).

A poll conducted by Gallup Pakistan during January 2011 of over 2,700 men and women in rural and urban areas of all four provinces of the country, found 67% of Pakistanis responding yes to the question In your opinion should government take steps to ‘Islamise’ the society? 13% of those polled answered that Pakistan did not need Islamisation and 20% gave no response. In 2016 an opinion poll by PEW found that 78% of Pakistanis said that the country's laws should strictly follow the Quran and a further 16% of Pakistanis said that the laws should follow the values and principles of Islam, but not strictly follow. This was the highest figure amongst all Muslim populations surveyed by PEW.

A 2010 opinion poll by PEW Research Centre also found that 87% of Pakistanis considered themselves 'Muslims first' rather than a member of their nationality. This was the highest figure amongst all Muslim populations surveyed. In contrast only 67% in Jordan, 59% in Egypt, 51% in Turkey, 36% in Indonesia and 71% in Nigeria considered themselves as 'Muslim first' rather than a member of their own nationality, as per the command of traditional Islamic doctrine.

== See also ==
- 2020 Karak temple attack
- Bengali language movement
- Blasphemy law in Pakistan
- Hudud Ordinance
- International propagation of Salafism and Wahhabism
- Islamisation
- Petro-Islam
- Secularism in Pakistan

== Bibliography ==
- Khan, Ayesha. The Women's Movement in Pakistan: Activism, Islam and Democracy. United Kingdom, Bloomsbury Publishing, 2018.
- Malik, I.. State and Civil Society in Pakistan: Politics of Authority, Ideology and Ethnicity. United Kingdom, Palgrave Macmillan UK, 1996.

== Bibliography ==
- Jaffrelot, Christophe (2016), The Pakistan Paradox: Instability & Resilience, Oxford University Press.
- Nasr, Seyyed Vali Reza Nasr (1996). Mawdudi and the Making of Islamic Revivalism. Oxford, New York: Oxford University Press. ISBN 9780195357110.
- Kennedy, Charles (1996). "Introduction". Islamization of Laws and Economy, Case Studies on Pakistan. Anis Ahmad, author of introduction. Institute of Policy Studies, The Islamic Foundation. p. 21.
- Kennedy, Charles (1996). Islamization of Laws and Economy, Case Studies on Pakistan. Institute of Policy Studies, The Islamic Foundation.
- Lau, Martin (1 September 2007). "Twenty-Five Years of Hudood Ordinances- A Review". Washington and Lee Law Review. 64 (4): 1292.
- Ghattas, Kim: Black wave : Saudi Arabia, Iran and the rivalry that unravelled the Middle East. Wildfire, London 2020, ISBN 978-1-4722-7110-5.
