= Pakistan Penal Code =

Penal code for all offences charged in Pakistan

Pakistan Penal Code (Act XLV of 1860)

Governor-General of Pakistan (Law Div) Imperial Legislative Council
- Citation: Act XLV of 1860
- Territorial extent: Pakistan
- Enacted by: Governor-General of Pakistan (Law Div); Imperial Legislative Council
- Enacted: 6 October 1860
- Commenced: 1 January 1862; 28 March 1949
- Authorizing legislation: Adaptation of Central Acts and Ordinances Order, 1949 (G.G.O. No. 4 of 1949)
- Committee report: First Law Commission

Amended by
- see Amendments
- Status: In force (amended)

The Pakistan Penal Code (Urdu: مجموعہ تعزیرات پاکستان; Majmū'ah-yi ta'zīrāt-i Pākistān), abbreviated as PPC, is a penal code for all offences charged in Pakistan. After the creation of Pakistan in 1947, the country inherited the former colonial Indian Penal Code (IPC), originally prepared by Lord Macaulay in 1860 on behalf of the government of British India. Subsequently after several amendments by different governments, in Pakistan it is now a mixture of Islamic and English law. Presently, the Pakistan Penal Code is still in effect and can be amended by the Parliament of Pakistan.

== History ==
The draft of the Indian Penal Code was prepared by the First Law Commission, and it was chaired by Lord Macaulay. Its basis is the law of England freed from superfluities, technicalities and local peculiarities. Suggestions were also derived from the French Penal Code and from Livingstone's Code of Louisiana. The draft underwent a very careful revision at the hands of Sir Barnes Peacock, Chief Justice, and puisne Judges of the Calcutta Supreme Court who were members of the Legislative Council, and it was passed into law in 1860. Macaulay did not survive to see the Penal Code's enactment.

The code was drafted principally by Macaulay, who had little experience as a practicing lawyer and devoted much of his time to literature and politics.

== Structure ==
The Pakistan Penal Code (PPC) consists of 23 chapters, and 511 sections covering various offenses and regulations. The PPC's jurisdiction applies throughout Pakistan and anyone who resides in the country.

Pakistan Penal Code (PPC); Sections 1 to 511
Chapter	Sections covered	Classification of offences
Chapter I	Sections 1—5	Introduction
Chapter II	Sections 6—52A	General Explanations
Chapter III	Sections 53—75	Of Punishments
Chapter IV	Sections 76—106	General Exceptions
Chapter V	Sections 107—120	Of Abetment
Chapter VA	Sections 120A—120B	Criminal Conspiracy
Chapter VI	Sections 121—130	Of Offences against the State
Chapter VII	Sections 131—140	Of Offences relating to the Army, Navy and Air Force
Chapter VIII	Sections 141—160	Of Offences against the Public Tranquillity
Chapter IX	Sections 161—171	Of Offences by or relating to Public Servants
Chapter IXA	Sections 171A—171I	Of Offences Relating to Elections
Chapter X	Sections 172—190	Of Contempts of Lawful Authority of Public Servants
Chapter XI	Sections 191—229	Of False Evidence and Offences against Public Justice
Chapter XII	Sections 230—263	Of Offences relating to coin and Government Stamps
Chapter XIII	Sections 264—267	Of Offences relating to Weight and Measures
Chapter XIV	Sections 268—294	Of Offences affecting the Public Health, Safety, Convenience, Decency and Morals.
Chapter XV	Sections 295—298	Of Offences relating to Religion
Chapter XVI	Sections 299—377	Of Offences affecting the Human Body.
Chapter XVII	Sections 378—462	Of Offences Against Property
Chapter XVIIIA	Sections 462A—462F	Of Offences relating to Oil and Gas, etc
Chapter XVIII	Section 463—489E	Offences relating to Documents and Property Marks: Offences relating to Documents (Sections 463—477A); Offences relating to Property and Other Marks (Sections 478—489E)
Chapter XIX	Sections 490—492	Of the Criminal Breach of Contracts of Service
Chapter XX	Sections 493—498	Of Offences related to marriage
Chapter XXA	Section 498A—498B	Of Cruelty by Husband or Relatives of Husband
Chapter XXI	Sections 499—502	Of Defemation
Chapter XXII	Sections 503—510	Of Criminal Intimidation, Insult and Annoyance
Chapter XXIII	Section 511A—511B	Of Attempts to Commit Offences

=== Section 53 (Punishments) ===
The punishments to which offenders are liable under the provisions of this Code are:

1. Qisas ("retribution");
2. Diyat;
3. Arsh (Pre-specified Compensation);
4. Daman (Compensation determined by court to be paid by the offender to the victim for causing hurt not liable to Arsh);
5. Ta'zir (punishment, usually corporal, that can be administered at the discretion of a judge)
6. Death;
7. Imprisonment for life;
8. Imprisonment, which is of two descriptions, namely:--
  1. Rigorous (i.e., with hard labour);
  2. Simple;
9. Forfeiture of property;
10. Fine

First five punishments are added by amendments and are considered Islamic Punishments, and very few have been sentenced to these punishments so far. Anyone who is sentenced to the first five punishments can appeal to the Federal Shariat Court.

=== PPC Criminal Offences ===
This law states that any person who commits a crime within Pakistan will be punished according to the laws of Pakistan and no other laws.

- 378. Theft (Offences Against Property):
  - Theft occurs when a person intentionally takes movable property from another person without their consent. This act involves moving the property with the intent to steal it. The property must be capable of being moved, and consent to take it can be explicit or implied. Even causing an animal to move property unintentionally can constitute theft. However, taking something unintentionally or believing it to be one's own property does not constitute theft.
  - 379. Punishment for Theft (Offences Against Property): Whoever commits theft shall be punished with imprisonment of either description for a term which may extend to three years, or with fine, or with both.
- 383. Extortion:
  - Extortion occurs when a person intentionally instills fear of harm in another individual to dishonestly obtain property, valuable securities, or documents that can be transformed into valuable securities. This includes threats such as defamation, kidnapping, or property damage.
  - 384. Punishment for extortion: Whoever, commits extortion shall be punished with imprisonment of either description for a term which may extend to three years, or with fine, or with both.
- 425. Mischief:
  - Mischief occurs when someone intentionally or recklessly destroys or damages property, causing wrongful loss or harm to the public or an individual. This includes actions that diminish the property's value, utility, or causes harm in any way. The intent to harm the property owner is not necessary; it is sufficient to intend to cause harm to anyone through property damage. Mischief can be committed against one's own property or jointly owned property.
  - 426. Punishment for mischief: Whoever commits mischief shall be punished with imprisonment of either description for a term which may extend to three months, or with fine, or with both.
- 441. Criminal trespass:
  - Whoever enters into or upon property in the possession of another with intent to commit an offence or to intimidate, insult or annoy any person in possession of such property, or, having lawfully entered into or upon such property, unlawfully remains there with intent thereby to intimidate, insult or annoy any such person, or with intent to commit an offence, is said to commit "criminal trespass".
  - 447. Punishment for criminal trespass: Whoever commits criminal trespass shall be punished with imprisonment of either description for a term which may extend to three months, or with fine which may extend to Rs 1500, or with both.
- 442. House-trespass:
  - Whoever commits criminal trespass by entering into or remaining in any building, tent or vessel used as a human dwelling or any building used as a place for worship, or as a place for the custody of property, is said to commit "house-trespass". Explanation: The introduction of any part of the criminal trespasser's body is entering sufficient to constitute house trespass.
  - 448. Punishment for house-trespass: Whoever commits house-trespass shall be punished with imprisonment of either description for a term which may extend to one year, or with fine which may extend to Rs 3000, or with both.

== Amendments ==
Does not include provincial amendments to the Pakistan Penal Code.

S. No.	Short title of amending legislation	Type	No.	Year
1	Adaptation of Central Acts and Ordinances Order, 1949	Ordinance	4	1949
2	Criminal Law (Amendment) Act, XXXVII of 1953	Ordinance	37	1953
3	Pakistan Penal Code (Amendment) Ordinance, LIX of 1962	Ordinance	59	1962
4	Pakistan Penal Code (Amendment) Act, XX of 1965	Legislative Act	20	1965
5	Pakistan Penal Code (Amendment) Act, XXVII of 1970	Legislative Act	27	1970
6	Offence of Zina (Enforcement of Hudood) Ordinance, VII of 1979	Ordinance	7	1979
7	Pakistan Penal Code (Second Amendment) Ordinance, XLIV of 1980	Ordinance	44	1980
8	Pakistan Penal Code (Amendment) Ordinance, XLI of 1980	Ordinance	41	1980
9	Criminal Laws (Amendment) Ordinance, III of 1980	Ordinance	3	1980
10	Federal Laws (Revision and Declaration) Ordinance, XXVII of 1981	Ordinance	27	1981
11	Pakistan Penal Code (Second Amendment) Ordinance, XXX of 1981	Ordinance	30	1981
12	P.P.C. (Amendment) Ordinance, I of 1982	Ordinance	1	1982
13	Anti-lslamic Activities Ordinance XX of 1984	Ordinance	20	1984
14	Criminal Law (Amendment) Ordinance, XXIV of 1984	Ordinance	24	1984
15	Criminal Law (Amendment) Act, III of 1990	Legislative Act	3	1990
16	Criminal Law (Amendment) Act, VII of 1993	Legislative Act	7	1993
17	Criminal Law (Amendment) Act, I of 1996	Legislative Act	1	1996
18	Pakistan Penal Code (Amendment) Act, XVI of 1996	Legislative Act	16	1996
19	Anti-Terrorism Act, XXVII of 1997	Legislative Act	27	1997
20	Criminal Law (Amendment) Act, II of 1997	Legislative Act	2	1997
21	Criminal Law (Amendment) Ordinance, LXXXV of 2002	Ordinance	85	2002
22	Criminal Laws (Reforms) Ordinance, LXXXVI of 2002	Ordinance	86	2002
23	Criminal Law (Amendment) Act, I of 2005	Legislative Act	1	2005
24	Protection of Women (Criminal Laws Amendment) Act, 2006	Legislative Act	6	2006
25	Criminal Law (Amendment) Act, I of 2010	Legislative Act	1	2010
26	Criminal Law (Amendment) Act, XX of 2011	Legislative Act	20	2011
27	Criminal Law (Second Amendment) Act, XXV of 2011	Legislative Act	25	2011
28	Criminal Law (Third Amendment) Act, XXVI of 2011	Legislative Act	26	2011
29	Criminal Law (Amendment) Act, XXIII of 2012	Legislative Act	23	2012
30	Criminal Law (Amendment) Act, VI of 2016	Legislative Act	6	2016
32	Criminal Law (Amendment) (Offences on pretext of honour) Act, XLIII of 2016	Legislative Act	43	2016
31	Criminal Law (Amendment) (Offense of Rape) Act, 2016	Legislative Act	44	2016
33	Criminal Law (Amendment) Act, IV of 2017	Legislative Act	4	2017
34	Criminal Law (Amendment) Act, II of 2024	Legislative Act	2	2024

== See also ==
- Section 420
- Court system of Pakistan
- Blasphemy law in Pakistan
- Copyright protection in Pakistan
- Gay rights in Pakistan
- Hudood Ordinance
- Women related laws in Pakistan
- Probation in Pakistan
- Swiss Civil Code
