= Hudud Ordinances =

Laws in Pakistan enacted in 1979

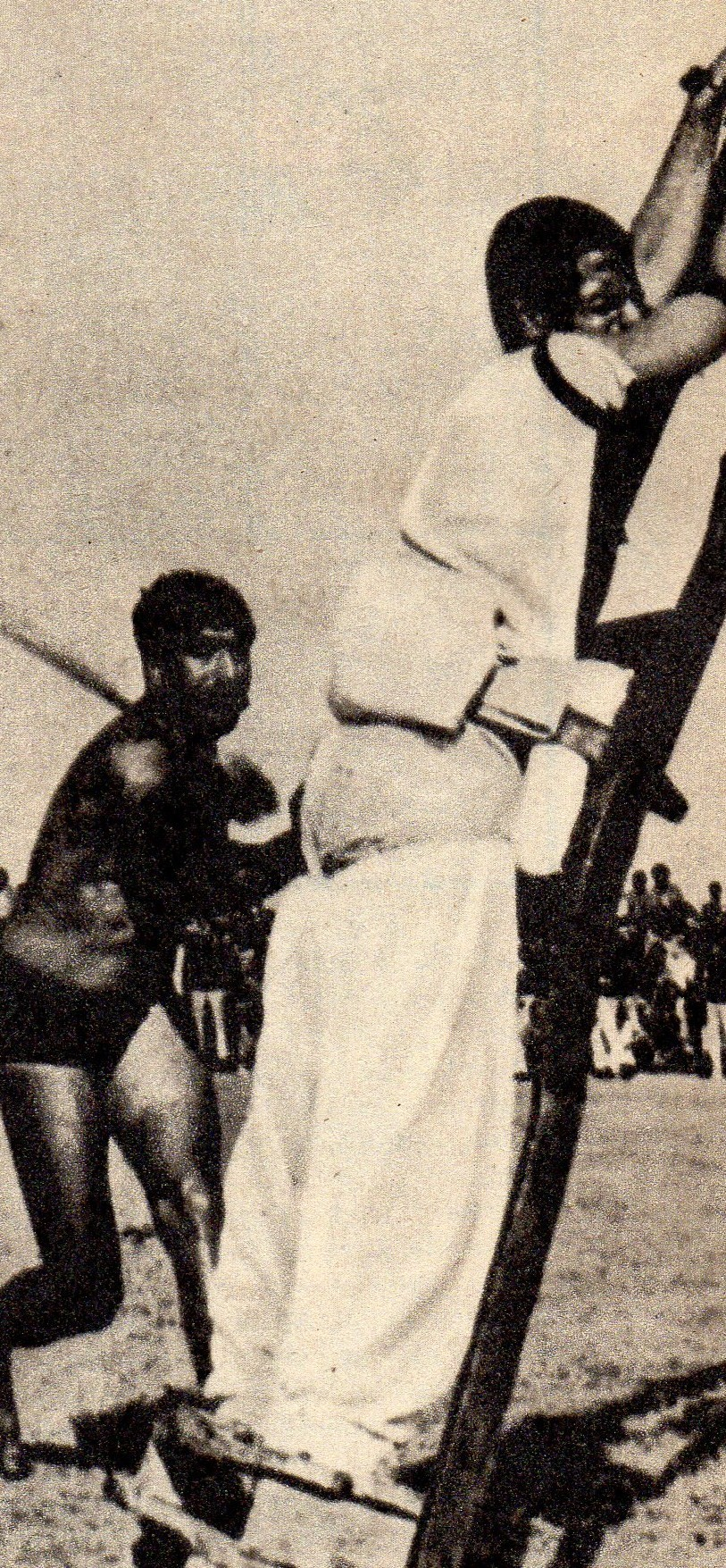
Flogging of a man who seduced a woman in Islamabad, Pakistan (late 1970s)

The Hudud Ordinances are laws in Pakistan enacted in 1979 as part of the Islamisation of Pakistan by Muhammad Zia-ul-Haq, the sixth president of Pakistan. It replaced parts of the British-era Pakistan Penal Code, adding new criminal offences of adultery and fornication, and new punishments of whipping, amputation, and stoning to death. The Deobandi ʿulamāʾ declared these Ordinances as un-Islamic. After much controversy and criticism, parts of the law were extensively revised in 2006 by the Women's Protection Bill.

The Hudood law was intended to implement Shari'a law or bring Pakistani law into "conformity with the injunctions of Islam", by enforcing punishments mentioned in the Quran and sunnah for zina (extramarital sex), qazf (false accusation of zina), theft, and consumption of alcohol. The system provided for two kinds of offences — hadd and tazir — with different punishments to go with them. Hadd offences (fixed punishment) require a higher standard of proof than tazir (discretionary punishment, a different category of sharia than Hudud but still part of the ordinances) and their punishments are more severe.

The zina provisions of the law were particularly controversial and critics alleged that there were "hundreds of incidents where a woman subjected to rape, or even gang rape, was eventually accused of zina" and incarcerated. In 2006 the laws were updated, excusing such women who failed to prove the rape.

== Ordinances ==
The ordinances follow the classical mainly Hanafi jurisprudence doctrine. One non-classical feature is that Hadd punishments can only be carried out after an appeal to the Federal Shariat Court has failed. The Federal Shariat Court, which has "exclusive jurisdiction" to examine whether or not a law is in accordance with the injunctions of Islam, was created along with the Ordinances.

Under the ordinances, tazir punishments often involve flogging.

=== Offences Against Property (theft) ordinance ===
Officially known as "The Offences Against Property (Enforcement Of Hudood) Ordinance (VI of 1979)."

- Offences Against Property liable to hadd must be
  - theft of something nisab level of value, i.e. property worth more than 4.457 grams of gold (about USD $258 as of 18 January 2022)
  - from a place where the property was protected.
  - evidence must be from a confession by the accused, or at least two Muslim adult male witnesses who are `tazkiyah-al-shuhood`, (truthful and non-sinners).
- Punishment for "theft liable to hadd";
  - first offence: "amputation of his right hand from the joint of the wrist";
  - second offence: "amputation of his left foot up to the ankle";
  - third offence: imprisonment for life;
- Theft liable to tazir: Whoever commits theft, which, is not liable to 'hadd' or
  - for which there is no confession or evidence provided by two qualifying Muslim adult male witnesses, or
  - for which 'hadd' may not be imposed or enforced under this Ordinance;
- Punishment for theft liable to tazir: is stipulated in the Pakistan Penal Code (Act XLV of 1860).

For robbery liable to hadd, the right hand of the offender and his left foot should be amputated by a surgeon.

=== Zina (extramarital) Ordinance ===
Officially known as "The Offence of Zina (Enforcement of Hudood) Ordinance (VII of 1979)" refers to fornication, adultery and zina bil jabbar (rape). The most controversial of the four ordinances, it has several distinct categories of sexual offences and assigned punishments for each:

- zina liable to hadd; punishable by
  - stoning to death for the adulterer
  - public whipping of 100 lashes for a fornicator
- zina liable to tazir; punishable by
  - imprisonment for up to ten years
- zina-bil-jabr liable to hadd;
- zina-bil-jabr liable to tazir;

Further Zina offenses are (or as of 1991 were)

- kidnapping
- sodomy
- enticement
- attempted rape
- abetment of zina crime
- deceitful marriage
- conspiracy to engage in prostitution

Under hadd, eyewitnesses evidence of the act of penetration by "at least four Muslim adult male witnesses", about whom "the court is satisfied", that "they are truthful persons and abstain from major sins (kabair)" (tazkiyah al-shuhood). Because of this stringent standard, no accused has ever been found guilty and stoned to death in Pakistan, and punishments have been awarded only under the Tazir provision of the Hudood Ordinance which uses circumstantial evidence.

The ordinance also abolished Pakistan's statutory rape law.

The 2006 Act has now removed zina bil jabbar from the Zina Hudood Ordinance and inserted sections 375 and 376 for Rape and Punishment respectively in the Pakistan Penal Code to replace it.

=== Qazf (false accusation of fornication or adultery) Ordinance ===
Officially known as: "The Offence of Qazf (Enforcement of Hudood) Ordinance of 1979". It described the offence of false accusation of Zina (fornication and adultery) either written, verbal or "by visible representations", with intent to cause harm, and without producing four witnesses in support of the accusation before the Court, or who "according to the finding of the Court", a witness has given false evidence of the commission of zina or rape, or when a complainant has made a false accusation of rape;

- Proof of "qazf liable to hadd" includes the accused confessing to it in court, the accused committing qazf in court, or if two Muslim adult male witnesses (other than the victim of the qazf) testify that the defendant committed qazf. (If the accused is a non-Muslim, the witnesses may be non-Muslims.)
- Punishment of "qazf liable to hadd" will be a whipping numbering 80 stripes.
- "Qazf liable to Tazir" applies whenever
  - proof in any of the forms mentioned above is not available,
  - or when the perpetrator has committed 'qazf' against any of his descendants,
  - or when the victim of qazf has died during the "pendency of the proceedings";
- punishment of "qazf liable to tazir" shall be imprisonment for up to two years, a whipping of up to 40 stripes, and may also include a fine.

=== Prohibition (alcohol) Order ===
Officially known as: "The Prohibition (Enforcement of Hadd) Order of 1979", described the offence of producing, importing, selling, owning, possessing or consuming alcohol.

- Producing, bottling, selling alcohol is punishable by imprisonment of up to five years, or flogging of up to 30 stripes, and may also be fined.
- Owning or possessing is punishable by imprisonment of up to two years, or flogging of up to 30 stripes, and may also be fined.
- Drinkers liable to hadd are adult Muslims who "takes intoxicating liquor by mouth" if they confess to drinking or evidence is given by "two Muslim adult male witness" of good character.
  - They "shall be punished" with flogging of "eighty stripes".
- Drinkers liable to tazir include
  - non-Muslim citizens of Pakistan who have been drinking (unless it is "part of a ceremony prescribed by his religion"):
  - non-Muslim, non-citizens of Pakistan, who have been drinking in a public place;
  - Muslims for whom "the offence stands proved by the evidence on the record" but not by hadd evidence of two Muslim witnesses, etc.
  - these drinkers shall be punished by imprisonment of up to three years, flogging of up to 30 stripes, or both.
- Owning or possessing heroin, cocaine, opium or coca leaf is also punishable with imprisonment, flogging and fines.

=== Whipping Ordinance ===
"The Execution of the Punishment of Whipping Ordinance of 1979" was developed to regulate the punishment of whipping/flogging.

It specifies that whips shall be made of leather, or a cane or a branch of a tree, be no longer than 1.22 meters and no thicker than 1.25 cm. The convict shall be medically examined before flogging to determine if the flogging should be "applied in such manner and with such intervals" that it does not kill the offender being flogged. Flogging may be postponed if the offender is ill, pregnant, or if the weather is too cold, etc. Stripes shall not be applied to "the head, face, stomach or chest or the delicate parts of the body of the convict," and should not lacerate the skin of the convict.

== Controversy and revision ==
=== Whipping ===
In 1996 the Abolition of Whipping Act (passed by Benazir Bhutto's Pakistan People's Party), forbade sentences/punishments of whipping offenders except when imposed as a hadd punishment. It has "greatly reduced" the instances of corporal punishment.

=== Zina (extramarital) Ordinance ===
In the two and a half decades the law was unchanged, several Pakistani government appointed commissions recommended the Zina Ordinance's repeal (such as the National Commission for the Status of Women in 2003, the Special Committee to Review the Hudood Ordinances, 1979, Commission of Inquiry for Women). Critics of the law alleged that while no one had actually been executed by stoning or had their hand or foot amputated in punishment as a result of the law, the ordinance made it dangerous to file rape charges as the women could be punished under tazir if they failed to prove an allegation of rape. In 1979, before the ordinances went into effect there were 70 women held in Pakistani prisons; by 1988, there were 6000. In 2004, eighty-eight of the two hundred and forty-six women held at the Karachi Central Jail were held under the Hudood Ordinance's Zina laws. Almost all of the women were working class, factory and domestic workers, and almost all were there because of a complaint filed by a family member saying they had committed Zina.

According to legal scholar Martin Lau

While it was easy to file a case against a woman accusing her of adultery, the Zina Ordinance made it very difficult for a woman to obtain bail pending trial. Worse, in actual practice, the vast majority of accused women were found guilty by the trial court only to be acquitted on appeal to the Federal Shariat Court. By then they had spent many years in jail, were ostracised by their families, and had become social outcasts.

A woman alleging rape was initially required to provide eyewitnesses of good standing and moral character (Tazkiyah-al-Shuhood); the eyewitnesses would have had to have witnessed "the act of penetration" for the death penalty to apply to the rapist; if there were no witnesses then Ta'zir would apply.

In principle, the failure to find such proof of the rape does not place the woman herself at risk of prosecution. According to Mufti Taqi Usmani, who was instrumental in the creation of the ordinances:

If anyone says that she was punished because of Qazaf (false accusation of rape) then Qazaf Ordinance, Clause no. 3, Exemption no. 2 clearly states that if someone approaches the legal authorities with a rape complaint, she cannot be punished in case she is unable to present four witnesses. No court of law can be in its right mind to award such a punishment.

However, in practice, these safeguards have not always worked. In addition, because the ordinance abolished Pakistan's statutory rape law, girls as young as twelve were prosecuted for having extra-marital intercourse "under circumstances that would previously have mandated statutory rape charges against their assailant," according to Human Rights Watch.

Stories of suffering by women who claimed to have been raped appeared in the press in the years following the passing of the Hudood Ordinance, stirring protests by Pakistani activists and lawyers and international human rights organisations. One case was that of Safia Bibi, an unmarried blind woman from the northwest frontier who was prosecuted for zina because of her illegitimate pregnancy. She was given a jail sentence of 3 years with 15 stripes of lashings and a fine of 100 rupees under tazir. Her rapist was acquitted. The judge ruled that there insufficient evidence to link him with rape.

The evidence of guilt was there for all to see: a newborn baby in the arms of its mother, a village woman named Zafran Bibi. Her crime: she had been raped. Her sentence: death by stoning. Now Ms. Zafran Bibi, who is about 26, is in solitary confinement in a death-row cell.

Thumping a fat red statute book, the white-bearded judge who convicted her, Anwar Ali Khan, said he had simply followed the letter of the Qur'an-based law, known as hudood, that mandates punishments.

"The illegitimate child is not disowned by her and therefore is proof of zina," he said, referring to laws that forbid any sexual contact outside marriage. Furthermore, he said, in accusing her brother-in-law of raping her, Ms. Zafran had confessed to her crime.

The appeal judgment of the Federal Shariah Court cleared the girl of the accusation of zina.

Another scenario for some of the accusations of adultery leading to imprisonment was following divorce by the husband and remarriage by the ex-wife.

A triple talaq is pronounced. The woman returns to her parental home. She goes through her period of iddat. After a while the family arranges another match and she gets married. The husband then claims that sans the confirmation of divorce by the local authorities the marriage is not over and launches a zina prosecution. It is necessary to delete this definition [of a valid marriage] to shut this door.

A number of international and Pakistani human rights organisations argue that Hudood Ordinance goes beyond what is required by sharia. They are opposed by right wing religious parties (Muttahida Majlis-e-Amal (MMA)), who accuse them of departing from Islamic values.

Furthermore, the ordinance became a tool of misuse to quell and compromise women’s fundamental rights.

==== Case study ====
A study by Charles Kennedy of the Hudood Ordinances based on random stratified sample of cases tried by the Federal Shariat Court (FSC) from 1980–84, found 88% of cases heard by the FSC were Zina Ordinance-related, that the court acquitted over half (52%) of the appellates (an "extraordinarily high" number), and "fully upheld" less than one in five (19%) of the convictions. Around 90% of the cases were overturned based on misappreciation of the facts, not misappreciation of the law. The average time that defendants had to wait for disposition of their cases (in jail unless they were granted bail) after the "First Information Report" in district and sessions courts was around eighteen months. However, the acquitted defendants still had to contend with high legal fees, social consequences facing even acquitted defendants, and time in jail until their appeal was heard unless they were granted bail.

The study found the ordinance was used to file "nuisance or harassment suits against disobedient daughters or estranged wives." Three common patterns in the cases were:

1. a man and a woman are accused of zina by the father or older brother of the accused woman, the complainant(s) not consenting to the marriage or relationship;
2. a complainant accuses his "former" spouse of zina when she remarries;
3. a girl bring charges of rape against her 'boyfriend' after she is confronted by her relatives with alleged evidence of possible wrongdoing or dishonor.

Kennedy states that "clearly the perception that Zia's program significantly discriminated against women's rights is fundamentally flawed". 84% of those convicted in district and sessions courts under Hudood law were men, and 90% of those whose convictions were upheld by the FSC were men, thus the law cannot be accused of gender bias. He does not argue with statements such as "eight out of every ten women in jail today are those charged with the offence of Zina". He also states "it is undoubtedly the case" that the Hudood Ordinances, or at least their implementation, "discriminated against Pakistan's lower socioeconomic classes". Only 2% of those convicted were middle-class (and none upper-class).

Human rights attorney Sadakat Kadri replies that "Kennedy reached that mistaken view" because he compared male and female "conviction statistics as though they were alike, ignoring the fact that most men would have been rapists, whereas the women would all have been rape victims or alleged consenting adulterers."

==== Reforming the Hudood Ordinance ====
Attention to the Ordinance and suggestions for revising it were given by a number of government appointed commissions, a several-weeks-long televised debate on the subject of "No debate on Hudood Allah (Allah's laws as prescribed in Quran and Sunnah)-is the Hudood Ordinance (Man's interpretation of Allah's law) Islamic?" on Geo television channel, and a 2005 University of Karachi Department of Public Administration workshop.

In 2006, then President Pervez Musharraf again proposed reform of the ordinance. On November 15, 2006, the "Protection of Women (Criminal Laws Amendment) Act" was passed in the National Assembly, allowing rape to be prosecutable under civil law. The bill was ratified by the Senate on 23 November 2006, and became law after President Musharraf signed it on 1 December 2006.

The bill

- returns a number of offenses from the Zina Ordinance to the Pakistan Penal Code, where they had been before 1979;
  - since rape, unlike zina and qazf, is not mentioned in the Quran, rape is now excluded from Islamic criminal law.
- reformulates and redefines the offenses of zina and qazf (the wrongful accusation of zina);
  - no complaint of adultery or rape can be converted into one of fornication;
- creates an entirely new set of procedures governing the prosecution of the offenses of adultery and fornication.
  - adds to the Pakistan Penal Code a new offense of false accusation of fornication, so that an accusation of fornication runs the risk of a lengthy prison sentence if the complaint does not result in a conviction;
  - adultery is the only offense retained in the Zina Ordinance. A complaint of adultery must be made to a judge with at least four witnesses testifying under oath that they witnessed the act of penetration.

Legal experts have claimed that the original law was not so unbalanced as its opponents claimed or that the reforms will be impossible to enforce.

Human rights groups and activists in Pakistan have also criticised the bill, with one group complaining: "The so-called Women's Protection Bill is a farcical attempt at making the Hudood Ordinance palatable". The concern is that thousands of rapes go unreported as victims fear that they would be treated as criminals. In contrast Martin Lau has said that the Act "cannot be dismissed as a mere window dressing undertaken to satisfy a Western audience."

==== Criminal Law (Amendment) (Offense of Rape) Act 2016 ====
On 7 October 2016, Pakistan's parliament unanimously passed new anti-rape and anti-honour killing bills. The new laws introduced harsher punishments for the perpetrators of such crimes. According to the new anti-rape bill, DNA testing was made mandatory in rape cases. Sabotaging or disrupting the work of a police officer or Government official could result in imprisonment of 1 year under the new law. Government officials who are found taking advantage of their official position to commit the act of rape (e.g. custodial rape) are liable to imprisonment for life and a fine. According to the new law, anyone who rapes a minor or a mentally or physically disabled person will be liable for the death penalty or life imprisonment.

The recording of the statement of the female survivor of rape or sexual harassment shall be done by an Investigating Officer, in the presence of a female police officer, or a female family member of the survivor. Survivors of rape shall be provided legal aid (if needed) by the Provincial Bar Council. The new law also declares that trials for offences such as rape and related crimes shall be conducted in-camera and also allows for the use of technology such as video links to record statements of the victim and witnesses, to spare them the humiliation or risk entailed by court appearances. The media will also be restricted from publishing or publicising the names or any information that would reveal the identity of a victim, except when publishing court judgements. The trial for rape shall conclude within three months. However, if the trial is not completed within three months then the case shall be brought to the notice of the Chief Justice of the High Court for appropriate directions. The new bill also ensures that sex workers are also included in the law's protection.

UN Women Executive Director, Phumzile Mlambo-Ngcuka, hailed the Government of Pakistan's decision to pass the anti-rape and anti-honour killing bills.

== See also ==
- Hudood
- Pakistan penal code
- Women related laws in Pakistan

== Bibliography ==
- Khan, Shahnaz. Zina and the Moral Regulation of Pakistani Women, Feminist Review, Volume: 75 issue: 1, page(s): 75-100, Issue published: December 1, 2003; Sage Journals, doi:10.1057/palgrave.fr.9400111
