= Freedom of religion in Pakistan =

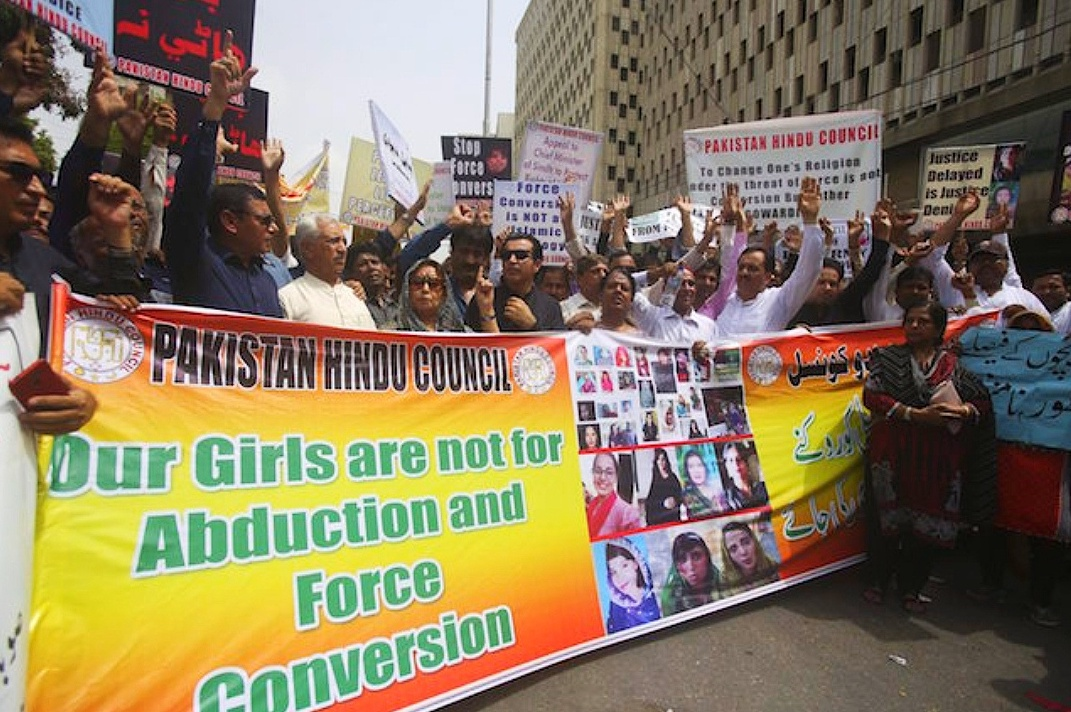
Protest against forced conversion of Hindu girls conducted by Pakistan Hindu Council

Freedom of religion in Pakistan is formally guaranteed by the Constitution of Pakistan for individuals of various religions and religious sects.

Pakistan gained independence in 1947 and was founded upon the concept of two-nation theory. At the time of Pakistan's creation the 'hostage theory' had been espoused. According to this theory the Hindu minority in Pakistan was to be given a fair deal in Pakistan in order to ensure the protection of the Muslim minority in India. After the creation of Pakistan, Muhammad Ali Jinnah, appointed Jogendra Nath Mandal, a Hindu as law minister and Zafarullah Khan, an Ahmadiyya as foreign minister in his first cabinet. Similarly the Country's flag was amended to add a white strip to symbolize the religious minorities. However after his death in 1948, debates surrounding Pakistan’s Islamic identity came to dominate political discourse, and in 1956, the state adopted the name of the "Islamic Republic of Pakistan", declaring Islam as the official religion.

According to the 2023 Census, Pakistan's population is predominantly Muslim (96.35%), followed by Hindus (2.17%) and Christians (1.37%). Other minorities communities include Sikhs, Zoroastrians, and the Kalash people who practice an ancient form of Hinduism mixed with old pagan and animist beliefs. There are also Baháʼí and Parsis, as well as minority Muslim sects like Ahmadiyya, Zikrism, and Shia (including Bohras, Ismailis, Dawoodis, and Khojas).

According to the Global Human Rights Defence, the US Commission on International Religious Freedom, and the United States Department of State, religious minorities face severe discrimination in Pakistan including forced conversions and marriages and blasphemy accusations. Despite new allegations of torture and extrajudicial killings emerging, the government of Pakistan has not taken adequate measures to hold law enforcement agencies accountable for these serious abuses. Additionally, Islamist militants have carried out attacks targeting law enforcement officials and religious minorities, resulting in the loss of dozens of lives.

However, in recent years, Pakistan has seen development in safeguarding the rights of the minorities. For instance, in 2017 the Hindu marriage act was passed, in 2019, Supreme Court of Pakistan ordered registration of Christian marriages. In another case, Pakistan opened the Kartarpur Corridor, allowing Sikh pilgrims from around the world to visit Gurdwara Darbar Sahib, one of the holiest shrines in Sikhism, as a goodwill gesture towards minorities. But recently also, a judge in Pakistan nullified the "free-will" marriage of a Hindu girl, Mehik Kumari, and confirmed that she was underage when she "embraced" Islam and married a Muslim man. Activists had argued that Kumari was abducted and forcibly converted to Islam.

In 2016, Sindh, Pakistan's most religiously diverse province, with 8% religious minority population (predominantly Hindus) passed a bill that outlawed forced conversions. After being passed by the Provincial Assembly, the bill was tabled by a faction of the Pakistan Muslim League called PML-F, Pakistan Muslim League Functional, which in Sindh is led by Sufi leader Pir Pagara.

== Blasphemy laws ==
The Pakistan Blasphemy Law derives from section 295-C of the Pakistan Penal Code, added by the Criminal Law (Amendment) Act, III of 1986, S. 2, which states that whoever "defiles the sacred name of the Holy Prophet Muhammad (peace be upon him) shall be punished with death, or imprisonment for life, and shall also be liable to fine." This law is phrased in vague terms (therefore violating the principle of legality), and is often used to level false accusations at people from religious minorities. Asia Bibi is a notable example of a person against whom such a violation occurred. Victims of these false accusations are often presumed guilty, and can be convicted without substantive evidence. ‘Sentences for these offences range from fines to long terms of imprisonment, and in the case of defamation of the Prophet Muhammad, a mandatory death sentence.’ 'This law thus serves as a legal justification to persecute religious minorities, or any other person, by means of false accusations in pursuit of personal vendettas or disputes'. By failing to repeal this law, the government is complicit in encouraging discriminatory prosecutions. In January 2023, the National Assembly of Pakistan voted to make the country’s blasphemy laws more stringent, sparking alarm among minority communities who feared it could fuel rights abuses and be used to further target religious minorities. On 17 January the National Assembly unanimously passed the Criminal Laws (Amendment) Bill, increasing punishment for insulting the Prophet Mohammed’s companions, wives, and family members from three years to 10 years imprisonment, along with a fine of 1 million Pakistani rupees (approximately GBP £3,500).

Pakistan's blasphemy laws are problematic both in their form and their application and have been the source of much debate and harm since the 1980s. The Federal Minister for Minorities Affairs, Shahbaz Bhatti, was assassinated on 2 March 2011 for his lifelong stand against the laws and the Governor of Punjab, Salmaan Taseer, was killed by his own bodyguard on 4 January 2011 for standing up for a blasphemy defendant. In Pakistan, “blasphemy” allegations are often made on the basis of little or no evidence. There is overwhelming evidence that the laws violate human rights and have encouraged people to take the law into their own hands.

Critics of the blasphemy laws have called for change. In 2019, the US Secretary of State Mike Pompeo appealed to Pakistan to stop the misuse of the law, estimating that over 40 people were serving life sentences or facing execution for blasphemy in Pakistan.

Independent human rights organisation Global Human Rights Defence receives a number of cases each month from the representatives of victims of the blasphemy law. According to the 2012 United States Commission on International Religious Freedom (USCIRF) annual report, "The government of Pakistan continues to engage in and tolerate systematic, ongoing, and egregious violations of freedom of religion or belief." The USCIRF has designated Pakistan as "country of particular concern" since 2002. The report argues that "The country’s blasphemy laws, used predominantly in Punjab but also nationwide, target members of religious minority communities and dissenting Muslims and this frequently results in imprisonment. The USCIRF is aware of at least 16 individuals on death row and 20 more serving life sentences. The blasphemy law, along with anti-Ahmadi laws that effectively criminalise various practices of their faith, has created a climate of vigilante violence. Hindus have suffered from the climate of violence and hundreds have fled Pakistan for India."

Farahnaz Ispahani who was the media advisor to the President of Pakistan from 2008 to 2012, has blamed the successive Pakistani governments of pursuing a "slow genocide" against minorities to shore up their political base. A BBC FAQ notes that "Beginning in 1980, a slew of clauses was added to the chapter of religious offences in the Pakistan Penal Code. These clauses can be grouped into two categories - the anti-Ahmadi laws and the blasphemy laws." The BBC notes that there is widespread popular support for these laws in Pakistan, and that two prominent critics of these laws, Salman Taseer and Shahbaz Bhatti, have been assassinated in 2011. Regarding the blasphemy laws, the BBC observes that: "Hundreds of Christians are among the accused - at least 12 of them were given the death sentence for blaspheming against the Prophet."

== The Ahmadi position ==
The Pakistan government does not ban formally the public practice of the Ahmadiyya, but its practice is restricted severely by law. A 1974 constitutional amendment declared Ahmadis to be a non-Muslim minority because, according to the Government, they do not accept Muhammad as the last prophet of Islam. However, Ahmadis consider themselves to be Muslims and observe Islamic practices. In 1984, under Ordinance XX the government added Section 298(c) into the Penal Code, prohibiting Ahmadis from calling themselves Muslim or posing as Muslims; from referring to their faith as Islam; from preaching or propagating their faith; from inviting others to accept the Ahmadi faith; and from insulting the religious feelings of Muslims. This section of the Penal Code has caused problems for Ahmadis, particularly the provision that forbids them from "directly or indirectly" posing as Muslims. The Ahmadis must not use the standard Muslim greeting form and must not name their children Muhammad. The constitutionality of Section 286(c) was upheld in a split-decision Supreme Court case in 1996. The punishment for violation of this section is imprisonment for up to 3 years and a fine. It has been alleged that this provision has been used extensively by the Government and anti-Ahmadi religious groups to target and harass Ahmadis. Ahmadis also are prohibited from holding any conferences or gatherings.

Pakistan made an amendment to its constitution in 1974, declaring Ahmadis as non-Muslims. In the following decade, military dictator Muhammad Zia-ul-Haq prohibited Ahmadis from calling themselves as Muslims.

The May 2010 Lahore attacks left 94 dead and more than 120 injured in nearly simultaneous attacks against two mosques of the minority Ahmadiyya Community Tehrik-i-Taliban Pakistan, as well as their Punjab wing, claimed responsibility for the attacks and were also blamed by the Pakistani police.

The Ahmadi community released a persecution report in 2018 in which the discrimination faced by Ahmadis in Pakistan has been detailed including "indiscriminate arrests" of people from the community. Ahmadis are forbidden to call themselves Muslims or use Islamic symbols in their religious practices. They are also mandated to declare themselves as non-Muslims in order to vote in general elections. Another report listed 3963 news items and 532 editorial pieces in the country's Urdu-language media for spreading "hate propaganda" against Ahmadis.

In September 2018, several Islamist groups in Pakistan publicly opposed the selection of Atif Mian, who is from the Ahmadi community, as a member of the government's Economic Advisory Council. He was removed less than a week after selection owing to pressure from Islamist groups. Voice of America reported that after the ouster of Mian the "Ahmadi community fears a renewed sense of religious intolerance and discrimination" in Pakistan.

== Electoral process for non-Muslims ==
In 1980s Zia ul-Haq introduced a system under which non-Muslims could vote for only candidates of their own religion. Seats were reserved for minorities in the national and provincial assemblies. Government officials stated that the separate electorates system is a form of affirmative action designed to ensure minority representation, and that efforts are underway to achieve a consensus among religious minorities on this issue. But critics argue that under this system Muslim candidates no longer had any incentive to pay attention to the minorities. Pakistan's separate electoral system for different religions has been described as 'political Apartheid'. Hindu community leader Sudham Chand protested against the system but was murdered. In 1999, Pakistan abolished this system.

== Ministry of Religious Affairs ==
The Ministry of Religious Affairs, which is entrusted with safeguarding religious freedom, has on its masthead a Koranic verse: "Islam is the only religion acceptable to God." The Ministry claims that it spends 30 percent of its annual budget to assist indigent minorities, to repair minority places of worship, to set up minority-run small development schemes, and to celebrate minority festivals. However, religious minorities question its expenditures, observing that localities and villages housing minority citizens go without basic civic amenities. The National Commission for Justice and Peace (NCJP) of the Catholic Bishops' Conference, using official budget figures for expenditures in 1998, calculated that the Government actually spent $17 (PRs 850) on each Muslim and only $3.20 (PRs 160) on each religious minority citizen per month. Religious minority interests have also been represented by a Minorities Ministry, which has taken various forms and now sits under the Religious Affairs Ministry again, since June 2013.

== International Views ==
On 23 September 2009, the United States House of Representatives introduced a "House Resolution 764" which calls on Pakistan to restore religious freedom in the country where Hindus, Christians, Ahmadiyyas and Baháʼís (the religions mentioned by name) are subjugated. The resolution was introduced by Representative Chris Smith. As of December 2016, the resolution failed.

In 2018, Pakistan was seen as one of the top 5 countries with the highest levels of social hostilities involving religion, along with India, Nigeria, Egypt and Bangladesh.

In 2022, Freedom House rated Pakistan’s religious freedom as 1 out of 4, noting that the blasphemy laws are often exploited by religious vigilantes and also curtail the freedom of expression by Christians and Muslims, especially Ahmadis. Hindus and Christians have spoken of vulnerability to kidnapping and forced conversions.

== Demographics ==
In the 1941 census of India, there were 5.9 million non-Muslims in the territories that came to form the Dominion of Pakistan in 1947. During and after the Partition of India and resulting independence of Pakistan, about 5 million Hindus and Sikhs emigrated to India, with Punjab alone accounting for migration of 3.9 million people. According to the 1951 census conducted by the Government of Pakistan, (West) Pakistan had 1.6% Hindu population. In East Pakistan (now Bangladesh), non-Muslims comprised 23.2% of the total population. Much of the decrease in minorities of Pakistan has occurred due to the events surrounding the partition and the wars of 1965 and 1971. It has been attributed to reasons like communal violence and discrimination that minority communities face. Another reason for low non-Muslim percentage is because of higher birth rates among the Muslims.

By 1997, the percentage of Hindus remained stable at 1.6% in Pakistan, while Bangladesh has witnessed a decline to 9.2% by 2011. In Pakistan, religious minorities remain subject to violence and discrimination. Authorities frequently fall short in providing sufficient protection and holding perpetrators accountable for their actions.

Religious groups in Pakistan (2023 Census)
Religious group	Pakistan		Punjab		Sindh		Khyber Pakhtunkhwa		Balochistan		ICT	
Religious group	Total Population	Percentage	Pop.	%	Pop.	%	Pop.	%	Pop.	%	Pop.	%
Islam	231,686,709	96.35%	124,462,897	97.75%	50,126,428	90.09%	40,486,153	99.62%	14,429,568	99.09%	2,181,663	95.55%
Hinduism	5,217,216	2.17%	249,716	0.2%	4,901,407	8.81%	6,102	0.02%	59,107	0.41%	884	0.04%
Christianity	3,300,788	1.37%	2,458,924	1.93%	546,968	0.98%	134,884	0.33%	62,731	0.43%	97,281	4.26%
Ahmadiyya	162,684	0.07%	140,512	0.11%	18,266	0.03%	951	0%	557	0%	2,398	0.11%
Sikhism	15,998	0.01%	5,649	0%	5,182	0.01%	4,050	0.01%	1,057	0.01%	60	0%
Zoroastrianism	2,348	0.001%	358	0%	1,763	0%	36	0%	181	0%	10	0%
Others	72,346	0.03%	15,249	0.01%	38,395	0.07%	8,944	0.02%	8,810	0.06%	948	0.04%
Total responses	240,458,089	99.57%	127,333,305	99.72%	55,638,409	99.9%	40,641,120	99.47%	14,562,011	97.77%	2,283,244	96.59%
Total population	241,499,431	100%	127,688,922	100%	55,696,147	100%	40,856,097	100%	14,894,402	100%	2,363,863	100%

Much of the decrease in minorities of Pakistan has occurred due to the events around the partition, the wars of 1965 and 1971. According to the 1951 census conducted by the Government of Pakistan, West Pakistan had 1.6% Hindu population, while East Pakistan (now Bangladesh) had 22.05%. And in the 1998 census conducted by the Government of Pakistan, Hindus made up 1.85% of the population and Christians (Protestant and Roman Catholic) 1.59%, or around 3.2million people. Other estimates put the numbers higher. Historically, there was also a small contingent of Jews in Pakistan who emigrated to Israel in 1948 due to the fear of persecution based on religious grounds post India - Pakistan partition.In 1995, the Parsis put their number at 2,831 and now they number at 2,348 in 2023 census. of which between 550,000 and 600,000 are Ismailis, and who pay tribute to their living spiritual leader, the Aga Khan. In a 2011 book, Ishtiaq Ahmed wrote that "Some independent studies, however, suggest that the non-Muslims population of Pakistan is nearly 10 per cent and Hindus, Christians and Ahmadis make up four million each. It is generally noted that while majorities play down minority figures, the minorities inflate them. This is especially true of the Ahmadiyya community. Official statistics return less than 150,000 for them while the Ahmadis claim to be around ten million."

Non Muslim Voters of Pakistan The number of minority voters rose to 4.43 million in 2022 from 3.63 million since 2018. In 2022, according to the Government of Pakistan's National Database and Registration Authority (NADRA), the population of officially registered religious minorities in Pakistan was as follows:

- Hindus: 22,10,566
- Christians: 18,73,348
- Ahmadis: 1,88,340
- Sikhs: 74,130
- Baha'is: 14,537
- Parsis: 3,917
- Buddhists: 1,787
- Shintoism: 628
- Jews: 628
- African religions followers: 1,418
- Kalash religion: 1,522
- Jainism: 6
- Others: 2,000

== Religious Indoctrination through Education ==
During the partition of India, India was divided on religious lines based on the theory of two-nation, which subscribes that Hindus and Muslims were two different nations within India and thus cannot live together due to their difference. The bloodshed during the partition, coupled with three major wars with India and other skirmishes, ultimately support the national policy for the Islamization of the state and the principle of the two-nation theory, wherein the trifecta of Muslims, Islam and Pakistan cannot be challenged. This anti-India view coupled with religious teaching against the Kafir (Non-believer in Islam) Hindus became the primary reasons for discrimination against the Hindus. Indophobia, together with Anti-Hinduism and racist ideologies, such as the martial race theory, were the driving factors behind the re-writing of school textbooks in Pakistan (in both "secular" schools and Islamic madrassahs) in order to promote a biased and revisionist historiography of the Indian subcontinent that promulgated Indophobic and anti-Hindu prejudices. These narratives are combined with Islamist propaganda in the extensive revising of Pakistan's history. By propagating concepts such as jihad, the inferiority of non-Muslims, India's perceived ingrained enmity with Pakistan, etc., the textbook board publications used by all government schools promote an obscurantist mindset. During the 1971 Bangladesh Liberation War, the Indian government decided to support the creation of a separate state for ethnic Bengalis resulting in a war between India and Pakistan. During the war, the government of Pakistan began a nation-wide propaganda against India (by extension against Hindus) and with the Independence of Bangladesh and surrender of Pakistani forces to the Indian side, the government continued the propaganda.

In 1971, textbook reform in Pakistan began with the introduction of Pakistan Studies and Islamic studies by Zulfiqar Ali Bhutto into the national curriculum as compulsory subject. Former military dictator General Zia-ul-Haq under a general drive towards Islamization, started the process of historical revisionism in earnest and exploited this initiative. "The Pakistani establishment taught their children right from the beginning that this state was built on the basis of religion – that's why they don't have tolerance for other religions and want to wipe-out all of them." While public schools incorporate religious content into their instruction, madrasas—Islamic religious schools—offer a more concentrated form of religious education, often limited to the memorization of the Quran with little emphasis on secular subjects. Concerns have been raised that some madrasas promote more rigid or militant interpretations of Islam, contributing to ideological radicalization among youth in certain regions.

In 1976, an act of parliament required all government and private schools (except those teaching the British O-levels from Grade 9) to follow a curriculum that includes learning outcomes for the federally approved Grade 5 social studies class such as: "Acknowledge and identify forces that may be working against Pakistan", "Make speeches on Jihad", "Collect pictures of policemen, soldiers, and national guards" and "India's evil designs against Pakistan".

From 1977 to 1988, during the rule under General Muhammad Zia-ul-Haq, a program was initiated for the Islamization of Pakistan, under which the Madrassass (traditional religious schools) in Pakistan received state sponsorship for the first time decimating educational institutions based on religious grounds. The number of madrassas number grew from 893 to 2,801 during the Zia years according to one source. Another states that 12,000 were opened from 1983 to 1984. Most were Deobandi in doctrinal orientation, while one quarter of them were Barelvi. They received funding from Zakat councils and provided free religious training, room and board to impoverished Pakistanis. The schools, which banned televisions and radios, have been criticized by authors for stoking sectarian hatred both between Muslim sects and against non-Muslims. The military government of Zia explicitly favored Deobandi madrassas which were promoting more scripturalist interpretation of Islam that could justify jihad. In line with this multifaceted strategy of Pakistan, Barelvis, the majority of the country's population, control only 25% of madrassas, while Deobandis, who make up approximately 15% of the population, disproportionately run 60% of the country's madrassas. The unprecedented increase in the number of madrassas after the downfall of the Zia regime proves that subsequent Pakistani governments, likewise Zia, have been mindful of the benefits that could accrue from supporting and controlling madrassas.

In the early 1990s, Mujahideen introduced military training into the madrassa curriculum in Peshawar, Pakistan, in order to provide a new generation of "holy warriors". In the eyes of Pakistani politicians and policymakers, what was perceived as the Mujahideen's triumph over the Soviets in Afghanistan, could be also replicated in Indian Administered J&K thus the Government of Pakistan supported and aided the terrorist activities. Furthermore, the ISI agency of Pakistan decided to push aside some educational institutions belonging to moderate political groups and backed more extreme ones affiliated to Islamist proxy forces such as Hizbul Mujahideen, JeM, Harakat-ul-Mujahideen and LeT. The confession of an arrested member of LeT in 2002 showed that he was politically motivated and religiously justified to pick up weapons and kill the kaffirs (non-believers of Islam) of India during the school assemblies. Through the course of moral exclusion, which Abu Masood implemented, adolescents are trained to situate the dehumanized targets into the category of "the others", establishing them as potential enemies who deserve to be killed Qari Hussain, a Taliban commander who has been given the name of “Trainer of Suicide Bombers” confirms that radicalization takes place in madrassas and argues that “Children are tools to achieve God's will. And whatever comes your way, you sacrifice it.”

After 9/11 terrorist attacks, the 9/11 Commission pointed out to Pakistan that almost all of the 9/11 attackers spent some time in Pakistan and traveled the north–south nexus of Kandahar-Quetta-Karachi and stressed that the Pakistani madrassas were being used "as incubators of violent extremism". This brought the Pakistani Madrassas system in international attention. In 2003 President Musharraf stated during a televised show that they must finish off religious extremism and that they must not use the mosques to spread hatred. In January 2005, Musharraf stated that the use of mosques and seminaries as producers of hate and extremism must be stopped. And few months later in August 2005, President Musharraf announced that they would not let any madrassa harbor terrorists or teach extremism and militancy. But the hearing before the Subcommittee on National Security & Foreign Affairs in 2007 stated that the President Musharraf has made efforts to "take on the threat of extremism but has not shut down extremist-linked madrassas or terrorist camps. Taliban forces still pass freely across the Pakistan-Afghanistan border and operate in Pakistani tribal areas".

A madrassa was blasted away in 2009 when the explosive took off during the preparation. The bomb was being stored in the home of the madrassa teacher who was a member of a banned terrorist group. 16 were killed including children, and over 120 were injured in this incident.

In 2009, Pakistan introduced the National Education Policy has created three different parallel educational institutions: private schools, public schools and madrassas. Private schools would have more secular-oriented curricula with special emphasis on neutral sciences, while the madrassas would choose Islamic jurisprudence, theology and strict interpretation of Islam over skill-oriented syllabi and in the middle of this contradictory spectrum there are state-run schools, also known as the so-called public educational sector, which provide mix-educational curricula. The idea was that the private and public-school would help in preparing students to be law-abiding democratic citizens and providing them with more secular or neutral education, are less likely to produce students sympathetic to terrorism. But despite that students from private and public schools have been given the opportunity to learn secular disciplines such as mathematics and sciences, the promotion of religious violence was not confined only to the ideological sections of the curriculum, but instead the systemic fusion of violence and hatred can be traced which travelled to different subjects and textbooks. The following quote from a fourth-grade textbook of a public school stands as an example:

“The speed of a Kalashnikov bullet is 800 meters per second. If a Russian is at the distance of 3,200 meters from a mujahid [fighter], and the mujahid aims at the Russian's head, calculate how many seconds it will take for the bullet to strike the Russian...”

According to a The New York Times report published in 2009, there were over 12,000 registered madrasas in the country, about half were located in Punjab, with southern Punjab having one of the highest concentrations. Although madrasas made up only around 7 percent of primary schools at that time, their influence was amplified by the failure of the state education system and the deep-rooted religiosity of the countryside. A 2005 attempt to register these schools was met with resistance, as 20 percent of areas in Punjab refused to comply. Punjab police reported that more than two-thirds of suicide bombers in the province had attended madrasas. Pervez Hoodbhoy, a prominent critic of Pakistan's education policies, remarked, “Education in Pakistan was left to the dogs,” highlighting the government's longstanding neglect that has allowed extremist influences to take root.

Islamic Studies textbook for an eighth-grade student, approved by the federal government, teaches students that they must be prepared “to sacrifice every precious thing, including life, for jihad.” At present, jihad is continuing in different parts of the world,” the chapter continues. “Numerous mujahedin [holy warriors] of Islam are involved in defending their religion, and independence, and to help their oppressed brothers across the world.”

The textbook further teaches the adolescent students that Muslims are allowed to “take up arms” and wage jihad in self-defense or if they are prevented from practicing their religion. “When God's people are forced to become slaves of man-made laws, they are hindered from practicing the religion of their God,” the textbook says.“When all the legal ways in this regard are closed, then power should be used to eliminate the evil." The book further teaches the eighth-grade students that “If Muslims are being oppressed, “then jihad is necessary to free them from this cruel oppression.” The following quote is from the same eighth grade federally approved textbook stands as an example:

“Jihad” can mean peaceful struggle as well as holy war. Jihad can be waged on several levels, beginning with a peaceful, inner struggle for one's own soul and escalating to killing “infidels.”

Pakistani textbooks depict non-Muslim citizens of Pakistan in a biased manner, often characterizing Pakistani Christians as representatives of Western or British colonial powers and Pakistani Hindus as minorities within the Muslim-majority population with affiliations to India. This portrayal fosters hostility and animosity. These history books are contaminating and indoctrinating the minds of the youth with a deliberate propagation of false narratives and rigid ideologies. Pakistani historian Khursheed Kamal Aziz has criticized Pakistani history textbooks. He stated that textbooks were full of historical errors and suggested that mandatory study amounted to teaching "prescribed myths". After examining 66 textbooks used at various levels of study Aziz argued that the textbooks supported military rule in Pakistan, promoted hatred for Hindus, glorified wars, and distorted the pre-1947 history of Pakistan

In April 2010, Rana Sanaullah Khan, former Law Minister of Punjab, visited a madrassa operated by the banned extremist organization Sipah-e-Sahaba Pakistan (SSP), Jamaat-ud-Dawa, another terrorist group, received nearly one million dollars from the Pakistan Muslim League-Nawaz (PML-N) government in Punjab for its allegedly educational programs.

In 2011 the United States Commission on International Religious Freedom (USCIRF) released a report on the public schools and Madrassas in Pakistan. They found a strong correlation between Pakistani and Islamic identity, considering the religious make-up and strength of Islamic practice in the country. Further they stated that the attitudes toward religious minorities were clear expressions of bigotry, ignorance, and hostility. The report concluded that the in government sponsored public schools, Hindu children are forced to read lessons about "Hindu conspiracies towards Muslims" and Christian children are taught that "Christian learned tolerance and kind-heartedness from Muslims". Further, report stated that a public shaming of religious minority children that begins at a very young age, focusing on their religious and cultural identity and their communities’ past history. The public-school students are being taught that religious minorities, especially Christians and Hindus, are nefarious, violent, & tyrannical by nature.

The study concluded:

- Public school textbooks used by all children often had a strong Islamic orientation,
- Public school and madrassa teachers had limited awareness or understanding of religious minorities and their beliefs, and were divided on whether religious minorities were citizens;
- Teachers often expressed very negative views about Ahmadis, Christians, and Jews, and successfully transmitted these biases to their students;
- Interviewees' expressions of tolerance often were intermixed with neutral and intolerant comments, leaving some room for improvement.

Further the report mentions many instances where young Pakistani students are taught to religiously discriminate against minorities from a young age. The report mentions that a federally approved Urdu Textbook teaches grade 10 students that "the Islamic religion, culture and social system are different from non-Muslims; therefore, it is impossible for them to cooperate with Hindus.”

The 2019 report on Religious Minorities in Pakistan compiled by Members of the European Parliament found: "The curriculum in Pakistani schools includes compulsory reading of Qu’ ran, the ideology of Pakistan based on the Islam, the Jihad and Shahadat path. The textbooks in schools extend the intolerance with systematic negative portrayals of minorities, especially Hindus. While teachings avoid denoting the contribution of religious minorities to the cultural, military and civic life of Pakistan, anti-Islamic forces are declared to endanger its very existence. By historic revisionism and unsubstantiated claims which convey religious bias, the Islamic civilization is glorified while religious minorities are denigrated."

A 2024 report by the Institute for Monitoring Peace and Cultural Tolerance in School Education (IMPACT-se) found that Pakistani school textbooks often depict Jews negatively, using hostile stereotypes and omitting key historical events such as the Holocaust. Judaism is largely excluded from religious education, and Adolf Hitler is praised in one civics textbook without mention of Nazi atrocities. The curriculum presents Pakistan as a leader of the Muslim world in opposition to the West, with regional rivals like India portrayed in strictly moral and religious terms. Jihad is frequently described as an armed and moral duty, while minorities and non-Islamic perspectives are often marginalized, reflecting broader patterns of religious discrimination in the education system.

According to Pakistani professor Tariq Rahman, Pakistani textbooks cannot mention Hindus without calling them cunning, scheming, deceptive, or something equally insulting. The textbooks ignore the pre-Islamic history of Pakistan except to put the Hindu predecessors in a negative light. The educational materials used in Pakistani schools contribute to the promotion of prejudice and intolerance towards Hindus and other religious minorities. Moreover, a significant number of teachers perceive non-Muslims as "enemies of Islam".

Examples of Promotion of Religious discrimination through Education

The following excerpts showcase the discriminatory and agitative nature of Pakistani school textbooks:

- The Class III (ages 7–8) book (Punjab Textbook Board) on Urdu teaches that Islam is superior to all other religions.
- The Class VII (ages 11–12) book (Sindh Textbook Board) on Islamic Studies reads: "Most of the [other] religions of the world claim equality, but they never act on it."
- The Class VIII (ages 12–13) book (Punjab Textbook Board) on Islamic Studies reads: "Honesty for non-Muslims is merely a business strategy, while for Muslims it is a matter of faith."
- The Class V (ages 9–10) book (Punjab Board) on Social Studies says: "Religion plays a very important role in promoting national harmony. If the entire population believes in one religion, then it encourages nationalism and promotes national harmony."
- The Class VI book (Punjab Board) on Islamic Studies says: "Though being a student, you cannot practically participate in jihad, but you may provide financial support for jihad."
- The Class IV (ages 8–9) book (Punjab Board) on Urdu says: "The better a Muslim we become, the better a citizen we prove to be."

== Constitutional & Other Legal Discriminations ==
=== Constitution of Pakistan ===
While the struggle for the Independence of Pakistan was going on, Jinnah had unequivocally said that Pakistan would be a secular state. But late the Objectives Resolution was adopted by the Constituent Assembly of Pakistan on March 12, 1949, which proclaimed that the future constitution of Pakistan would not be modeled entirely on a European pattern, but on the ideology and democratic faith of Islam. The resolution, in its entirety, has been made part of the Constitution of Pakistan under Article 2(A). This followed a judicial tussle to declare the Objectives Resolution as the "grundnorm" for Pakistan and, therefore, impliedly held that it stands above even the Interim Constitution or any Constitution that may be framed in the future, bring Article 2A as a major part of Constitutional debate. Though the debate was definitively resolved by the Supreme Court in the Hakim Khan case stating that Article 2A is neither self-executory nor has a supra-constitutional status.

Tolerance for religious discrimination can be found in the Constitution of Pakistan. Islam is named as the religion of the state, and whilst there is a provision allowing for minorities to practice their religions, they are still subject to the principles of "democracy, freedom, equality, tolerance and social justice as enunciated by Islam". The Preamble of the Constitution of Pakistan reads "Wherein adequate provision shall be made for the minorities freely to profess and practise their religions and develop their cultures" but after the coup of 1977 under General Zia-ul-Haq initiated the Islamization in Pakistan and the word “freely” was deleted from the Preamble and Article 2A that carried the original Objectives Resolution. It was later reinserted under the 18th Amendment.

Though the constitution recognizes the universal fundamental right of freedom of religion, it is subjected to a rider at the beginning of Article 20, namely “Subject to law, public order and morality”. This exception intended merely to protect public order in exceptional cases, has damaged the rule of freedom of religion in Pakistan.

Other provisions that are outrightly discriminatory are -

Article 41(2) provides that only Muslims can become President and the Prime Minister, thereby denying minorities the chance to hold the highest position of power. The Third Schedule to the constitution, which contains the text of the oath to be taken by the President before entering upon the said office, specifically provides, in relevant part, that the candidate shall affirm that he is a Muslim and believes in the Oneness of Allah, the Quran, and that Muhammad was the last of the prophets of Allah. Initially, there was no such bar of religion against the election of the Prime Minister. Article 91, in the original 1973 Constitution was substituted by P.O. No. 14 of 1985, providing that, “after the election of Speaker and Deputy Speaker, the National Assembly shall, to the exclusion of any other business, proceeds to elect without debate one of its Muslim members to be the Prime Minister”, thus debarring the non-Muslims. In 2019, Naveed Amir, a Christian member of the National Assembly moved a bill to amend the article 41 and 91 of the Constitution which would allow non-Muslims to become Prime Minister and President of Pakistan. However, Pakistan's parliament blocked the bill. Furthermore, in Shahid Orakzai case, the Supreme Court of Pakistan held that "the legislature may in its domain subject to the Constitution and the principle of equality before law and equal treatment before law can make a law that a non-Muslim citizen cannot be appointed against a particular post".

Article 227(1) states that "All existing laws shall be brought in conformity with the Injunctions of Islam as laid down in the Holy Quran and Sunnah, in this part referred to as the Injunctions of Islam, and no law shall be enacted which is repugnant to such Injunctions."

Article 228 provides the way for setting up of the Islamic Council, created to safeguard Islamic ideology. The Islamic Council can shape governmental decisions, actions and policy, which creates an institutionalized priority for Islamic ideas to the detriment of religious minorities.

Article 260(3) provides the legal definition between a Muslim and a non-Muslim. The articles define “Muslim” as "a person who believes in the unity and oneness of Almighty Allah" while define "non-Muslim" as "a person who is not a Muslim and includes a person belonging to the Christian, Hindu, Sikh, Buddhist or Parsi community, a person of the Quadiani Group or the Lahori Group who call themselves 'Ahmadis' or by any other name or a Bahai, and a person belonging to any of the Scheduled Castes."

The judicial system encompasses several different court systems with overlapping and sometimes competing jurisdiction, reflecting differences in civil, criminal, and Islamic jurisprudence. The federal sharia court and the sharia bench of the Supreme Court serve as appellate courts for certain convictions in criminal court under the Hudood Ordinances, and judges and attorneys in these courts must be Muslims. The federal sharia court also may overturn any legislation judged to be inconsistent with the tenets of Islam. Discrimination against religious minorities in Pakistan is embedded in the very structure of the constitution. Much has been written on the fact that the offices of President and Prime Minister are reserved for Muslims only.

==== Ninth Amendment to the Constitution of Pakistan ====
The Ninth Amendment to the Constitution of Pakistan would have imposed sharia law as the supreme law of the land by amending Article 2, 203B and 203D of the Constitution of Pakistan.

The Senate passed the bill and sent it to the National Assembly on 7 August 1986. Wasim Sajjad, the Minister for Justice and Parliamentary Affairs, referred the bill to committee. The committee was supposed to submit a report regarding the proposed amendment within 30 days but before the report could be presented, the National Assembly was dissolved and the bill lapsed.

=== Hudud Ordinance ===
The Hudud Ordinances are laws in Pakistan enacted in 1979 as part of the Islamization of Pakistan by Muhammad Zia-ul-Haq, the sixth president of Pakistan. The Hudood Law was intended to implement Shari'a law.

Some aspects of the Hudood Ordinances discriminate against non-Muslims. For example, a non-Muslim may testify only if the victim also is non-Muslim. Likewise, the testimony of women, Muslim or non-Muslim, is not admissible in cases involving Hadd punishments. To prove theft liable to hadd, evidence of two Muslim adult male witnesses, who are pure in Islamic concept, is required. A non-Muslim's evidence will not be accepted for hadd punishment where the accused is a Muslim. In other words, if a Muslim robs a non-Muslim household, the testimonies of non-Muslim victims will not be considered for awarding hadd punishment. However, a non-Muslim may testify in case the accused is a non-Muslim.

=== Ramadan Ordinance ===
During the Islamization in Pakistan, many Shariat laws were introduced. One of them, an Ehtram-e-Ramazan (reverence for fasting) Ordinance was issued banning eating, smoking, and drinking in public places in the holy month of Ramadan. According to a clause of this ordinance, those places including restaurants, canteens, bridges, lanes, and even the confines of private homes. While in theory the non-Muslim minority of Pakistan is exempt from the law, minorities have been arrested for eating in public.

=== Pakistan Penal Code ===
The Pakistan Penal Code (PPC) also contains many provisions that are outrightly discriminative towards the religious minorities in an Islamic country.

== State Sponsored Violence Against Religious Minorities ==
In January 1948, the Indian government started an evacuation process after the partition to protect the minorities during which almost 3000 Hindus began leaving Karachi every single day. The Pakistan administration later found out at that the Dalits and other low-caste Hindus which were heavily employed in the sanitation activities, are fast leaving the city creating a shortage for such administrative task. The sanitation crisis became evident on streets and required roughly 2000 workers but Muslim residents were too prideful to do these types of jobs. Therefore, in February 1948, Pakistan reviewed its administration policies and curbed the large scale migration of the depressed class. When objected by the Indian High Commissioner regarding the obstruction, the first Prime Minister of Pakistan Liaquat Ali Khan remarked that the Dalits and other lower caste of Hindus are required to stay in the city to perform the sanitation activities that were otherwise considered as immoral.

From the inception of Pakistan, the state has utilized religion as a cornerstone, as articulated by Pakistan's first Law Minister, Jogendar Nath Mandal, in his resignation from the cabinet of Prime Minister Liaqat Ali Khan. Mandal mentioned in his resignation letter to the Prime Minister about the success of the state policy of systematic ethnic cleansing of Hindus in the West Pakistan and "near completion" in East Pakistan. He explained in his resignation letter about the anti-Hindu policy pursued by the East Bengal Government especially the police administration and a section of Muslim League leaders. He further emphasized on the multiple cases of abduction and rape of Hindu women of all ages and stressed that no lower cast Hindu girl between the ages of 12 and 30 is alive in East Bengal due to systematic genocidal rape. He further mentioned the use of state in a planned manner through gradual stages in order to either convert the Hindus to Islam or to completely exterminate them. In East Bengal, even the Government servants of the Secretariat stuck work and came out in procession raising slogans of violence against the Hindus. He also mentioned about his stay in Dhaka where the total casualties during the Dacca and East Bengal riot were estimated to be around 10,000, most of which were from the minority Hindus. During the riots, after the whole-scale killing of all adult males, all the young Hindu girls were distributed among the ringleaders of the miscreants. He mentioned that the government officials are encouraging in the Jihad against the Hindus in order to distract the majority Muslims from the impending economic breakdown of East Bengal. Jogendar Nath Mandal, who himself belong to the minority religion of Hinduism escaped from Pakistan and took refuge in India in 1950.

The Government of Pakistan, in the name of suppression of Communists, used the police force and local Muslims leaders to loot the houses of Hindus and forced the "Hindus to send their women-folk at night to the camp to satisfy the carnal desires of the military." Police officials refused to write any complaints of the Hindus. Hindu Presidents of Union Boards had been replaced by Muslims by coercive measures with the active help and connivance of the police and Circle Officers. Hindu government servants were unjustly superseded by junior Muslims or dismissed without sufficient reason or any cause. The state machinery was used in a planned manner through gradual stages in order to either convert the Hindus to Islam or to completely exterminate them, therefore resulting in state sponsored genocide of the Hindus.

=== Islamization in Pakistan (1977-1988) ===
Islamization or Shariazation, has a long history in Pakistan since the 1950s, but it became the primary policy, or "centerpiece" of the government of General Muhammad Zia-ul-Haq, the sixth President of Pakistan from 1977 until his death in 1988. Zia has also been called "the person most responsible for turning Pakistan into a global center for political Islam." Zia-ul-Haq committed himself to enforcing his interpretation of Nizam-e-Mustafa ("Rule of the prophet" Muhammad), i.e. to establish an Islamic state and enforce sharia law.

In his first televised speech to the country as head of state he declared that "Pakistan which was created in the name of Islam will continue to survive only if it sticks to Islam. That is why I consider the introduction of [an] Islamic system as an essential prerequisite for the country."

Unlike in Iran, Islamization in Pakistan was politically conservative, working against, not with leftist forces and ideas. Zia had little sympathy with Bhutto or his populist, socialist philosophy—captured in the slogan, "Food, clothing, and shelter". General Zia explained in an interview:

The basis of Pakistan was Islam. ... Muslims of the subcontinent are a separate culture. It was on the Two-Nation Theory that this part was carved out of the Subcontinent as Pakistan.... Mr. Bhutto's way of flourishing in this Society was by eroding its moral fiber. ... by pitching students against teachers, children against their parents, landlord against tenants, workers against mill owners. [Pakistan has economic difficulties] because Pakistanis have been made to believe that one can earn without working. ... We are going back to Islam not by choice but by the force of circumstances. It is not I or my government that is imposing Islam. It was what 99 percent of people wanted; the street violence against Bhutto reflected the people's desire ...

=== Covid-19 Pandemic ===
During the 2020 COVID-19 Pandemic, religious minorities faced extreme discrimination, especially during the relief work. The COVID-19 virus was termed as "the Shia Virus", while Christians were forced to recite the Islamic kalima to receive Covid-19 aid. Hindus similarly faced discrimination as they were outright denied any relief aid. National identity cards (CNIC) were used to identify Hindus and limit their access to any relief aid.

On 28 March 2020, in Lyari, Karachi, Saylani Welfare Trust (SWT) organized a relief aid where relief aid was outright denied to the religious minority Hindus. Vishal Anand, founder and chairman of the Hindu Youth Council, stated that “When they saw our CNIC [identity cards], they refused to give the ration bags, saying it's not for Hindus.” Christians were also barred from receiving any relief aid in Karachi's Korangi area. In Sandha village in the Kasur district of Punjab, an estimated 100 Christian families were denied food.

A cleric, Sheikh Abdul Haleem Hamid, instructed volunteers that the food rations were only for Muslims. Moreover, Naumana Suleman, the Pakistan programs lead for Minority Rights Group International, said that “the food was organized by the local mosque through announcements to help poor people in need, but later the ration was distributed to the Muslims only.”

In the Mian Mir area of Lahore, there were boards that openly discouraged non-Muslims from coming to receive the rations. Boards announced that “When relief was being given, there was a notice up at the camp stating that non-Muslim should refrain from coming here for aid, as this is for the Muslims.”

These discriminations were further fueled by discriminating official circulars issued by the state officials, usually to segregate and limit the access of religious minorities. On 12 March 2020, the Inspector General (IG) of police in Balochistan issued a notification in which he put people belonging to the Hazara Shias community on leave. On 13 March 2020, the Water and Sanitation Authority (WASA), a public department, also issued a notification in which Hazara Shias living in Marriabad and Hazara Town, two majority areas for the Shia-majority ethnic group, were categorically asked to stay in their areas. On 25 March 2020, the Chief Secretary of Balochistan, the highest executive position in the province, held a press conference in which he announced that Hazara Shias areas will be secluded from the rest of Quetta city, province's capital. It was reasoned that since the Shia majority Iran was a hotspot of COVID-19 cases at that time, then Shia-majority areas should also be secluded and quarantined. Moreover, public institutions like the Civil Hospital and the State Bank of Pakistan, unofficially asked its employees belonging to the Hazara Shias community not to come to the office. Further, two government ministers, Zulfikar Bukhari and Ali Zaidi, both belonging to the Shias community, were singled out and blamed for the spread of the virus in Pakistan.

Farahnaz Ispahani, a former Pakistani lawmaker who is now a senior fellow at the Religious Freedom Institute, stated “The dehumanization of minorities coupled with these very scary times we are living in — a weak economy and now the pandemic — we may see a raft of people converting to Islam to stave off violence or hunger or just to live to see another day,”

The US Commission on International Religious Freedom (USCIRF) Commissioner Anurima Bhargava called the religious discrimination amid the COVID-19 Pandemic as "reprehensible" and urged the then Prime Minister of Pakistan, Imran Khan to "not leave religious minorities behind."

== Use of State Institutions to Propagate Against Religious Minorities ==
=== Pakistan National Cricket Team ===
Due to radical religious indoctrination since last fifty years, many members of Pakistan National Cricket Team have been radicalized and use their international reach and influence to convert as many non-Muslims to Islam as possible using fear, coercion or both. Many retired Pakistani cricketers, such as Inzamam-ul-Haq, Saeed Anwar, Mohammad Yusuf, and Saqlain Mushtaq, have taken to Islamic preaching. Moreover, it is also worth noting that there has been a total of 345 players who have played international cricket for the Pakistan men's cricket team. Only seven of them in its history, were non-Muslims and only two of them were Hindus indicating a strong bias against religious minority during the selection process.

In the tour report of 2007 World Cup, cricket team manager Talat Ali mentioned that most of the players of Pakistan National Cricket Team were spending more time preaching and finding converts (to Islam) than actually planning or practicing. This was also endorsed by the Pakistan National Cricket Team's media manager P J Mir. The then team coach Bob Woolmer initially supported the extreme religiosity because he thought it was uniting the team, but in the end, he became frustrated of the radicalization as players started spending most of their time in praying or preaching Islam instead of practicing, which impacted their performance.

During the 2014 Pakistan-Sri Lanka ODI Match, Pakistani cricketer Ahmed Shehzad was caught giving unsolicited religious suggestion to Sri Lankan player Tillakaratne Dilshan on the field, in order to convert Dilshan to Islam. During their walk back to the dressing room, Ahmed Shehzad was caught on camera telling Dilshan that "if you are a non-Muslim and you turn Muslim, no matter whatever you do in your life, straight to heaven." Though Dilshan's reply was inaudible, Ahmed Shehzad seemed to not like his reply as he strongly stated, “then be ready for the fire.” Later after facing a lot of backlash, the then Chief of PCB, Shaharyar Khan stated that the Shehzad's statement was stupid and that he had no business talking about religion on field, especially during a foreign tour. Due to lot of pressure, an interdisciplinary committee was set up to look into the controversy but its result remained unknown, effectively giving a clean chit.

Nine years after Shezad's failed attempt to convert Dilshan to Islam, former Pakistan spinner Danish Kaneria, one of the few non-Muslim cricketers in Pakistan National Cricket Team shared the video of the 2014 incident and stated that “Be it the dressing room, the playground or the dining table, this happened to me every day," suggesting that multiple attempts were also made to convert him to Islam. This is worth noting that Kaneria is one of the only two Hindus to ever play for the Pakistan National Cricket Team. Further explaining the discrimination, Kaneria explained that -

“My career was going really well. I am the fourth-highest wicket-taker for Pakistan in Tests. My career was on the right path, I was playing County cricket as well. Inzamam-ul-Haq supported me, he was the only person who supported me as captain, apart from Shoaib Akhtar also supported me. Shahid Afridi and the other players troubled me a lot, they never used to eat food with me. They used to talk with me about the conversion but my religion is everything to me. Shahid Afridi was the main guy who tried forcing me to convert to Islam, but Inzamam-ul-Haq was the only person who supported me,”

During an interview, ex-Pakistan skipper Inzamam Ul Haq claimed that former Indian cricketer Harbhajan Singh was captivated by the words of Maulana Tariq Jameel and expressed desire in converting to Islam. Singh immediately refuted the ordeal and claimed himself to be a "Proud Sikh". Inzamam-ul-Haq had also narrated about how he and Mohammad Yousuf tried to convert West Indies Cricket legend Brian Lara into Islam. He explained that they had invited him to a dinner, called 'Deen Ki Dawat' and explained to him about the rituals and practices of Islam and their dedication towards the Quran.

During a press conference, Pakistani Cricketer Mohammad Rizwan stated that "I believe that a human being is a brand ambassador of two things. If a person is a Muslim, he represents Islam wherever he goes. 2nd thing is that he is a brand ambassador of Pakistan. It doesn't matter what anyone says," Mohmmad Rizwan also has a history of expressing his religion on the field, especially during the matches that were held in India. During ICC Men's ODI World Cup 2023 that was held in India, Mohammad Rizwan was seen offering namaz on the cricket field during his team's opening match. Former Pakistan pace bowler Waqar Younis expressed his happiness and stated, “What I liked most is what Rizwan did. He stood in the middle of the ground and read the prayers in front of the Hindus,” After extreme backlash, Younis apologized for hurting the sentiments of Hindus.

In 2023, Pakistan cricketer Shahid Afridi publicly admitted during a conversation with Harbhajan Singh that he supports the Two-Nation Theory, which asserts that Hindus and Muslims cannot coexist peacefully, a belief that led to the partition of India and the creation of Pakistan.

== Hate Speech Against Religious Minorities ==
In 2017, after Quaid-i-Azam University's (QAU) Physics Centre was renamed after the first Noble laureate, Professor Dr Abdus Salam, retired Captain Muhammad Safdar, who is a leader of PML-N and the son-in-law of former Prime Minister Nawaz Sharif, objected in the National Assembly on the grounds of his religious identity. "These people [Ahmadis] are a threat to this country, its Constitution and ideology. This situation is heading towards a dangerous point," said Safdar against the community. Calling for 'action' against the community, Muhammed Safdar further said that he wanted to bring a resolution in the National Assembly calling for a “ban on recruitment of Qadianis [Ahmadis] in the armed forces because theirs is a false religion, in which there is no concept of jihad for Allah.”

In 2019 during an interview, Information Minister of Punjab, Fayyaz ul Hassan Chohan made derogatory remarks against Hindus, stating that:

“You cow urine-drinking people, listen to me... we are Muslims and we have the flag of Hazrat Ali (RA) and Hazrat Umar (RA)’s bravery. You don't have that flag. Idol-worshippers shouldn't operate under the delusion that they are better than Pakistan."

The comments were widely shared online and Chohan faced a lot of backlash. Following this, he was sacked from his position by the Chief Minister of Punjab, Usman Buzdar due to the pressure from the then Prime Minister of Pakistan, Imran Khan. This marked the first time that a sitting minister had to resign after making a derogatory remark against a minority community.

In 2021, a PTI lawmaker, Amir Liaquat Hussain posted the doctored image of a Hindu goddess to mock the opposition leader.

On 8 August 2024, while attending the Ulema-Mashaikh Conference in Islamabad, the Chief of Army Staff of Pakistan, General Syed Asim Munir stated "Those who do not recognise Sharia and the Constitution are not considered Pakistani."; implying that accepting Sharia is a pre-requisite for all the citizens (including the religious minority) to validate their citizenship. The Prime Minister of Pakistan, Shehbaz Sharif also attended the conference.

== Violence against religious minorities ==
Attacks on religious minorities in Pakistan have claimed hundreds of lives of religious minorities, such as Hindus, Pakistani Ahmadis, Shia, Sufis and Christians.

Women belonging to minority communities have been targets of forced conversions and marriages. Forced conversion, rape, and forced marriages of Hindu women in Pakistan have recently become controversial in Pakistan.

Attacks on minorities in the country have led to condemnation of policies that are discriminatory to religious minorities in Pakistan. Following the 2010 Lahore massacre, United Nations Secretary-General Ban Ki-moon said "Members of this religious community have faced continuous threats, discrimination and violent attacks in Pakistan. There is a real risk that similar violence might happen again unless advocacy of religious hatred that constitutes incitement to discrimination, hostility or violence is adequately addressed. The Government must take every step to ensure the security of members of all religious minorities and their places of worship so as to prevent any recurrence of today's dreadful incident." Ban's spokesperson expressed condemnation and extended his condolences to the families of the victims and to the Government.

The United States ambassador to Pakistan, Anne W. Patterson, issued a statement in 2010 saying that Pakistan had witnessed an increase in "provocative statements that promote intolerance and are an incitement to extremist violence.".

An editorial published in Dawn condemned the attacks, commenting that "Bigotry in this country has been decades in the making and is expressed in a variety of ways. Violence by individuals or groups against those who hold divergent views may be the most despicable manifestation of such prejudice but it is by no means the only one. Religious minorities in Pakistan have not only been shunted to the margins of society but also face outright persecution on a regular basis." Pakistan stands out as one of the most challenging countries for members of religious minority groups to live in, primarily because of the inadequate safeguarding of human rights for these communities. The past years have witnessed a disturbing escalation in the targeted oppression and violence against religious minorities within the nation.

Mass anti-Christian violence recently occurred in the 2009 Gojra riots and in the 2013 Joseph Colony riot and the 2013 Gujranwala riot. Anti-Shia violence includes the February 2012 Kohistan Shia Massacre, the August 2012 Mansehra Shia Massacre and the particularly deadly January 2013 and February 2013 Quetta bombings. The Ahmadiyya community in Pakistan was targeted in the similarly deadly May 2010 attacks on Ahmadi mosques in Lahore. Anti Hindu attacks include the 2014 Larkana temple attack, 2019 Ghotki riots, 2020 Karak temple attack, 2021 Bhong temple attack etc.

=== Christians ===
On 6 February 1997, a mob of 30,000 Muslims attacked Shanti Nagar, a Christian-majority town in Punjab, Pakistan, during Ramzan, over false blasphemy accusations. At least 10 people were killed, and 785 homes, churches, and schools were burned. Authorities failed to act until the military intervened. The violence drew international condemnation, with India, Amnesty International, and the Vatican criticizing Pakistan's failure to protect minorities.

In 2005, a mob set churches and Christian schools on fire in Faisalabad, forcing Christians to flee from their homes. In 2009, a mob set fire to about 40 houses and a church in Gojra and burnt eight people alive.

On 22 September 2013, a twin suicide bomb attack took place at All Saints Church in Peshawar, Pakistan, in which 127 people were killed and over 250 injured. On 15 March 2015, two blasts took place at Roman Catholic Church and Christ Church during Sunday service at Youhanabad town of Lahore. At least 15 people were killed and seventy were wounded in the attacks.

A church in Quetta was bombed with 9 being killed. The Islamic State group took responsibility for the attack.

According to an Open Doors claim in November 2017, Pakistan had the highest number of Christians killed in the world during the 12-month time period of 1 November 2015 to 31 October 2016, with 76 Christians being killed in the country. Pakistan also topped the list of highest number of documented church attacks, accounting for 600 of the total 1329 churches attacked worldwide during the same time period.

=== Hindus ===
A survey carried out by All Pakistan Hindu Rights Movement Pakistan's revealed that out of 428 Hindu temples in Pakistan only around 20 survive today and they remain neglected by the Evacuee Trust Property Board which controls those while the rest had been converted for other uses since 1990. However, in November 2019, government of Pakistan started restoring process for 400 Hindu temples in Pakistan. After restoration, the temples will be reopened to Hindus in Pakistan.

- On January 4, 2005, 16 year old Hemi and 18 year old Marvi were kidnapped from Kunri village in Umerkot district.
- On March 3, 2005, 14 year old Raji was kidnapped from Aslam Town Jhuddo in Mirpurkhas District.
- On December 22, 2005, 13 year old Mashu was kidnapped from Jhaluree village in Mirpur Khas District.
- On July 23, 2006, 15 year-old Pooja was kidnapped from Lyari town in Karachi District. A judge ruled that she should be released and although she was, she was kidnapped again and has been missing ever since.
- On August 2, 2006, 16 year old Komal was kidnapped from Hawks bay in Karachi District.
- On December 31, 2006, 17 year old Deepa was kidnapped from Tharparkar district in Sindh province.
- In May 2007, members of the Christian community of Charsadda in the North West Frontier Province of Pakistan, close to the border of Afghanistan, reported that they had received letters threatening bombings if they did not convert to Islam, and that the police were not taking their fears seriously.
- In June 2009, International Christian Concern (ICC) reported the rape and killing of a Christian man in Pakistan, for refusing to convert to Islam.
- Rinkle Kumari, a 19-year-old Pakistani student, Lata Kumari, and Asha Kumari, a Hindu working in a beauty parlor, were allegedly forced to convert from Hinduism to Islam. Their cases were appealed all the way to the Supreme Court of Pakistan. The appeal was admitted but remained unheard ever after.
- On September 23, 2014, Joti Kumari, a student of Electrical Engineering was kidnapped from Larkana City in Sindh District.
- A total of 57 Hindus converted in Pasrur during May 14–19. On May 14, 35 Hindus of the same family were forced to convert by their employer because his sales dropped after Muslims started boycotting his eatable items as they were prepared by Hindus as well as their persecution by the Muslim employees of neighbouring shops according to their relatives. Since the impoverished Hindus had no other way to earn and needed to keep the job to survive, they converted. Fourteen members of another family converted on May 17 since no one was employing them, later another Hindu man and his family of eight under pressure from Muslims converted to Islam to avoid their land being grabbed.
- Hindu sisters Reena and Raveena became the face of forced religious conversion in Pakistan in 2019. It prompted the Indian External Affairs Ministry to ask Pakistan to submit a report about it.
- January, 2019, 16-year-old Anusha Kumari was kidnapped and the Indian High Commission took up the matter, but no action was taken.
- In 2020, a 14-year-old Christian girl was allegedly abducted, converted to Islam and married off to a Muslim man in Karachi. However, in the court, the judges maintained that the girl has already had her first menstrual cycle and under the Islamic Shariah Law she should be considered an adult, making her marriage with her abductor legal and justified.

On 18 October 2005, Sanno Amra and Champa, a Hindu couple residing in the Punjab Colony, Karachi, Sindh returned home to find that their three teenage daughters had disappeared. After inquiries to the local police, the couple discovered that their daughters had been taken to a local madrassah, had been converted to Islam, and were denied unsupervised contact with their parents. In January 2017, a Hindu temple was demolished in Pakistan's Haripur district.

In 2006, a Hindu temple in Lahore was destroyed to pave the way for construction of a multi-storied commercial building. When reporters from Pakistan-based newspaper Dawn tried to cover the incident, they were accosted by the henchmen of the property developer, who denied that a Hindu temple existed at the site.

In July 2010, about 60 Hindus were attacked by 150 residents in Murad Memon Goth neighbourhood of Karachi and ethnically cleansed following an incident when a Hindu youth drank from a water tap near an Islamic mosque. About seven were injured, the injured stated that 400 Hindu families were being threatened to leave the area. In January 2014, in an attack on a temple in Peshawar, the guard was gunned down.

On March 15, 2014, a crowd of Muslims burnt a Hindu temple and a dharmashala in Larkana, Sindh, Pakistan, after unverified allegations of a Hindu youth desecrating a copy of the Quran. In January 2014, a policeman standing guard outside a Hindu temple at Peshawar was gunned down. The 25 March 2014 Express Tribune citing an All Pakistan Hindu Rights Movement (PHRM) survey said that 95% of all Hindu temples in Pakistan have been converted since 1990.

A senior Pakistani journalist stated that "Wealthy Muslim farmers see [Hindu girls] as fair game for abductions, rape, and prolonged sexual exploitation in captivity. Some notorious religious establishments proudly validate these alleged crimes. State institutions, the police and politicians have encouraged the trend by looking the other way." Harris Khalique claimed that "madrassas provide an institutional backing and that cannot happen if the state does not allow that. I rest the responsibility of such incidents squarely on the state, which fails its citizens."

In 2019, Fayyaz ul Hassan Chohan, the information and culture minister of Punjab province made derogatory remarks against the Hindu community in a television programme. However, later on, he apologised for his derogatory remarks and insisted that his remarks were aimed at Indian armed forces and Indian government and not against any Hindu community.

On April 10, 2019, Pakistan decided to restore over 400 Hindu temples which were either demolished or converted for other uses. Pakistan's federal government stated they are fulfilling the longstanding demand of the minority Hindus that their places of worship be restored to them. This action has been welcomed by the Hindu community living in Pakistan. The process will begin with two historic temples in Sialkot and Peshawar. According to a recent government estimate, at least 11 temples in Sindh, four in Punjab, three in Balochistan and two in Khyber Pakhtunkhwa were operational in 2019. Out of the 400 temples in Pakistan, only 13 temples are operational where members of the Hindu community perform their religious rituals.

In July 2021, over 60 Hindus were forcefully converted to Islam in the Mirpur Khas District and Mithi areas of Sindh.

A survey carried out by All Pakistan Hindu Rights Movement revealed that out of 428 Hindu temples in Pakistan, only around 20 survive today and they remain neglected by the Evacuee Trust Property Board which controls those while the rest had been converted for other uses. In the aftermath of the Babri Masjid demolition Pakistani Hindus faced riots. Mobs attacked five Hindu temples in Karachi and set fire to 25 temples in towns across the province of Sindh. Shops owned by Hindus were also attacked in Sukkur. Hindu homes and temples were also attacked in Quetta. The Jain Mandar at Jain Mandar Chowk in Lahore was destroyed by the Muslim mobs in 1992 and the government officially renamed Jain Mandar Chowk to Babri Masjid Chowk. According to the Human Rights Commission of Pakistan data, just around 1,000 Hindu families fled to India in 2013. In May 2014, a member of the ruling Pakistan Muslim League-Nawaz (PML-N), Dr. Ramesh Kumar Vankwani, revealed in the National Assembly of Pakistan that around 5,000 Hindus are migrating from Pakistan to India every year.

In June 2023, the Pakistan Higher Education Commission banned the celebration of the Hindu festival Holi on institute campuses to preserve "Islamic identity" and "sociocultural values" which flared the issue of religious discrimination in the country.

=== Sikhs ===
In 2010, a Sikh youth Jaspal Singh was beheaded in Khyber Agency after his family could not pay the large Jizya ransom. Consequently, thousands of Sikhs had to abandon their homes and flee from tribal areas to resettle in areas with larger Sikh populations, such as Peshawar, Hassanabdal and Nankana Sahib.

In May 2018, a prominent Sikh leader Charanjeet Singh was shot dead in Peshawar. It was the tenth targeted murder of a prominent Sikh since 2014, and "stirred unprecedented fear - and fury - among the community's members, particularly in Peshawar."

On 3 January 2020, Pakistani media reported that "scores of protesters surrounded the Gurdwara Nankana Sahib, on Friday afternoon, threatening to overrun the holy site if their demands for the release of suspects in an alleged forced conversion case were not met". There were also reports of stone-pelting on the shrine by a mob of angry local Muslims, that even threatened to convert it into a mosque.

On 27 July 2020, it was reported that the Gurdwara Shaheed Bhai Taru Singh, which is the site of martyrdom of Bhai Taru Singh, had been forcibly taken over and was converted into a mosque and named as Masjid Shahid Ganj.

In June 2023, two Sikh shopkeepers were attacked in a spate of less than 48 hours in Peshawar. One Sikh succumbed to his injuries whilst the other victim survived. ISIS claimed responsibility for the attacks and targeted the Sikhs for being "polytheistic".

=== Shias ===
In 2012 Jundallah militants stopped buses and massacred 18 men travelling on buses. All but one of the victims were Shia Muslim, while others on the buses were spared.

In 2012, Malik Ishaq, founder of the anti-Shia militant group Lashkar-e-Jhangvi, called Shias the "greatest infidels on earth" and demanded the country to declare them as "non-Muslims on the basis of their beliefs." Brad Adams, the Asia director of Human Rights Watch, stated that "The government's persistent failure to apprehend attackers or prosecute the extremist groups organizing the attacks suggests that it is indifferent to this carnage."

Shia Muslims, who make up 15-20% of the Muslim population in the country, have been "specifically targeted and killed by machine guns and suicide bombers." According to the data compiled by South Asia Terrorism Portal, there have been 446 incidents of violence against the Shia Muslims in Pakistan between 2003 and May 2016, in which more than 2558 people have been killed and over 4518 others injured.

In 2020, the European Foundation for South Asian Studies (EFSAS) in a report entitled, Guilty until proven innocent: The sacrilegious nature of blasphemy laws Pakistan, has said that the biggest proportion of Muslims charged with blasphemy offences belong to the Shia community. The paper has recommended wide-ranging changes to Pakistan's laws and legal systems. Thousand of Pakistanis marched in anti-Shia protests in Karachi, the country's financial hub, during early September, 2020. The march was caused due to Shia clergies making disparaging remarks against historical Islamic figures. The remarks were televised during the Shia Ashura procession. Ashura commemorates the Battle of Karbala, which caused the schism in Islam. Sunni groups demanded that disparaging remarks against any Islamic figures were not acceptable and would not be tolerated.

On January 3, 2021, a group of miners in Balochistan were victims of terrorist attacks. The attackers infiltrated and ambushed a coal mine near Mach, Pakistan; after which they "separated those who belonged to an ethnic group called Hazaras, blindfolded them, tied their hands behind their backs and brutally killed them". The Hazara community is an ethnic community from central Afghanistan of Hazarajat that have a mostly strong Shia religious identity. This event lead to a nationwide outcry and protest on social media. Imran Khan responded to the atrocities by accepting the demands of the attackers which infuriated the Pakistani victims.

=== Sufis ===
The July 2010 Lahore bombings killed 50 people and wounded 200 others in two suicide bombings on the Sufi shrine, Data Durbar Complex in Lahore.

The 2016 Khuzdar bombing on a Sufi shrine in Balochistan killed more than 47 people.

== Forced conversion ==
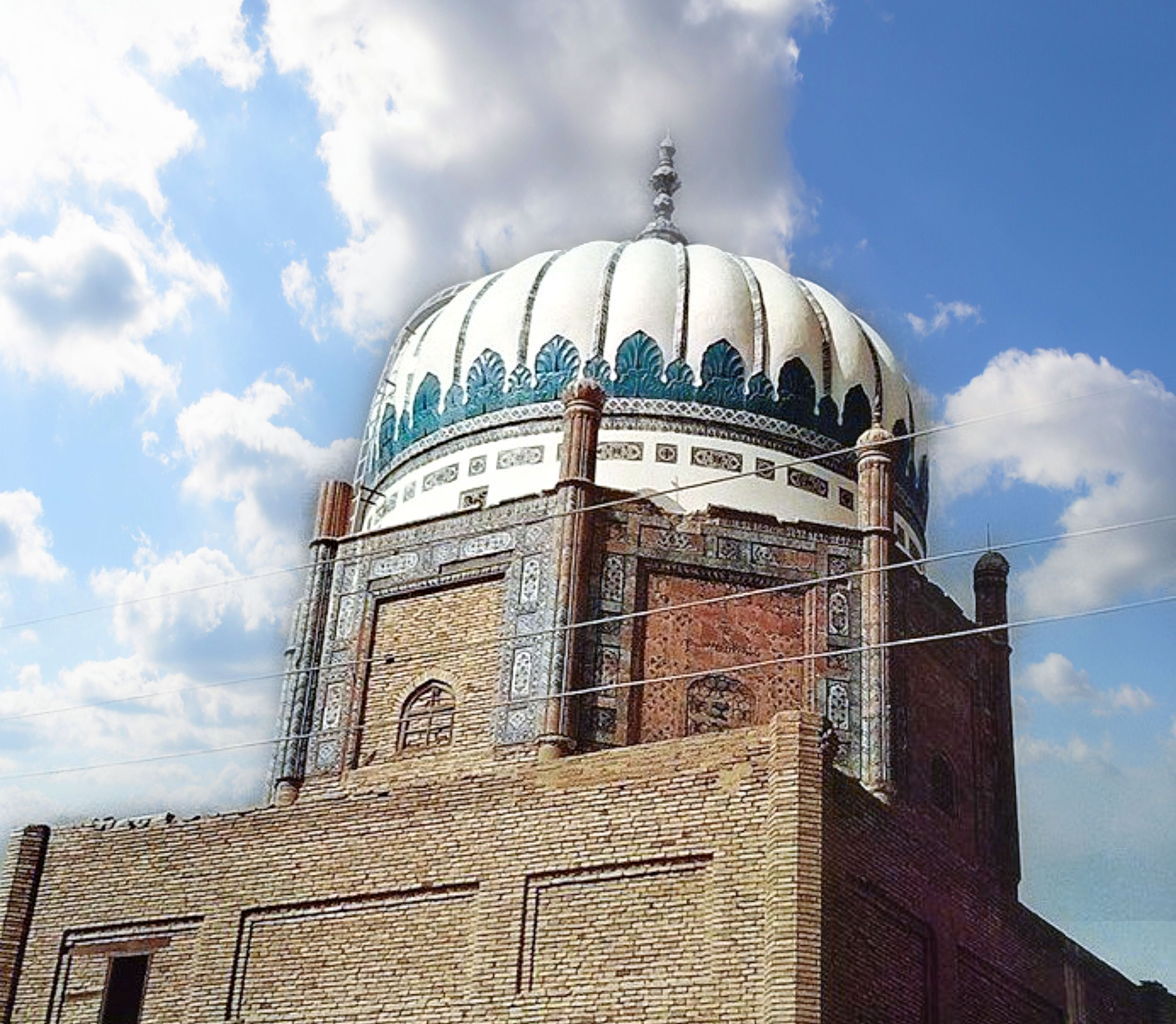
Dargah pir sarhandi, a frequent crime scene of forced conversion and marriage of kidnapped underage Hindu girls

Many Hindu girls living in Pakistan are kidnapped, forcibly converted and married to Muslims. More than a 1000 minor non-Muslim girls, mostly Hindu, are forcefully converted every year to Islam in Pakistan, although the number may be higher due to under-reporting. Religious institutions like Bharchundi Sharif and Sarhandi Pir support forced conversions and are known to have support and protection of ruling political parties of Sindh. Victims' families and activists have accused Abdul Haq (Mitthu Mian), a local political and religious leader of Bharchindi Shia Dargah in Sindh, of being responsible for subverting the legal process in numerous cases of kidnapping underage Hindu girls within the province and forcibly converting them to Islam and marrying them to older men at this dargah, as well as inciting violence against Hindus specially by misusing blasphemy laws. This practice is being reported increasingly in the districts of Tharparkar, Umerkot and Mirpur Khas in Sindh.

A Pakistan Muslim League politician has stated that abduction of Hindus and Sikhs is a business in Pakistan, along with conversions of Hindus to Islam. Many Islamic extremists believe that it is an achievement to convert a Hindu into Islam, and to do so can earn one a blessing.

Firstly underage girls are abducted from their homes or where they work, later re-appearing after having been married off to a Muslim. To prevent her from going back home or reporting the rape to the police, she is forcibly married to the perpetrator. Reports obtained by the NGO Global Human Rights Defence indicate that the perpetrators will often put a fake age of the girl on the marriage certificate to hide that she is underage. When the families of the girl try to report this to the police, they are often met by biased officers who refuse to file an FIR (First Information Report). The conversions are backed by powerful religious institutions and leaders who also offer incentives to people to convert. Moreover, the perpetrators will often force the victim to sign a report saying that she converted and married on her own free will, hindering the attempts of the family to have their child returned to them. Additionally, the perpetrators will often file counter-suits against the victim's family for harassment and for attempting to convert the girl back to her former religion.

As of 2013, the Human Rights Commission of Pakistan reported that cases of forced conversion are increasing. because over the past few years, laws governing the rights of religious minorities in Pakistan have changed from neutral to explicitly discriminatory. A 2014 report by the Movement for Solidarity and Peace (MSP) says about 1,000 women in Pakistan are forcibly converted to Islam every year (700 Christian and 300 Hindu). However, an opposing view also exists where All Pakistan Hindu Panchayat (APHP) leader said most of the interfaith marriages were result of love affairs.

Sikhs in Hangu district stated they were being pressured to convert to Islam by Yaqoob Khan, the assistant commissioner of Tall Tehsil, in December 2017. However, the Deputy Commissioner of Hangu Shahid Mehmood denied it occurred and claimed that Sikhs were offended during a conversation with Yaqub though it wasn't intentional.

According to the Amarnath Motumal, the vice chairperson of the Human Rights Commission of Pakistan, every month, an estimated 20 or more Hindu girls are abducted and converted, although exact figures are impossible to gather. In 2014 alone, 265 legal cases of forced conversion were reported mostly involving Hindu girls. In November 2019, Pakistan formed parliamentary committee to stop the act of forced conversion in the country.

== Cultural Policies ==
In a 1979 address to the nation, General Muhammad Zia-ul-Haq decried the influence of Western culture and music in the country. Soon afterwards, PTV, the national television network, ceased playing music videos or any music other than patriotic songs. Most of the cinemas in Lahore were shut down. (As of 2004, the "Lollywood" film industry of Pakistan produces around 40 films a year, compared to India's thousand or so releases.)

The common South Asian parting phrase "Khuda Hafiz" was discouraged in favour of "Allah Hafiz", which was first used in 1985 in the state-run media as it was said to be more Islamic than the former phrase that allowed for religious pluralism but in reality it divided greetings based on religious lines.

=== Festivals of Religious Minorities ===
In 2023, after the videos of hundreds of students dancing and celebrating the Hindu festival of Holi at Quaid-I-Azam University Islamabad, Pakistan went viral, Pakistan's Higher Education Commission (HEC), Islamabad issued a directive banning the celebration of Holi and other Hindu festivals across educational institutions in the country to save the 'eroding' Islamic identity. The Commission further stated that it was sad to witness "activities that portray a complete disconnect from our sociocultural values and erosion of the country's Islamic identity.” The notice issued by the Pakistan's Higher Education Commission (HEC) read that “One such instance that has caused concern was the fervor exhibited in marking Hindu festival of Holi. This widely reported/publicized event from the platform of a university has caused concern and has disadvantageously affected the country's image,” The official notice further stated that “While there is no denying the fact that cultural, ethnic, and religious diversity leads towards an inclusive and tolerant society, that profoundly respects all faiths and creeds; albeit it needs to be done so in a measured manner without going overboard. The students need to be apprised to be aware of the self-serving vested interests who use them for their own ends far from the altruistic critical thinking paradigm,” Pakistan's Higher Education Commission (HEC) also advised the institutions of higher educations to distance themselves from activities which are "incompatible with Pakistan's identity”.

After facing backlashes and outcry, the Pakistan's Higher Education Commission (HEC) withdrew the notice and stated that it is “highly respectful of all religions, faiths, and beliefs, and the associated festivals and celebrations observed in the country”.

== Socioeconomics ==
Christian workers often suffer from marginalization, wage gaps, unpaid wages, dismissals, and lack of holidays for important festivals. Many workers are subject to less than $2 a day wage with no safeguards or labor rights and they have complained about not receiving salaries in advance during holiday weeks. The Christian community has long been marginalized into sewer cleaning work. By 2023, the community still accounted for about 80 percent of the sanitation workforce across Pakistan. In Lahore, the figure stood at 76 percent. These workers are treated as social outcasts. The term "churha", which officially translates to "sweeper," is regarded by many as derogatory and is frequently considered a slur. Despite this, it continues to be used colloquially as a pejorative term to refer to Christians in Pakistan. A 2012 survey in Lahore reported that Christian households earned an average monthly income of $138 for a family of five, equivalent to about 92 cents per person per day, placing them well below the poverty line. By comparison, the national average monthly income in Pakistan that year was $255.

== Gallery ==
=== Hindu Temples ===
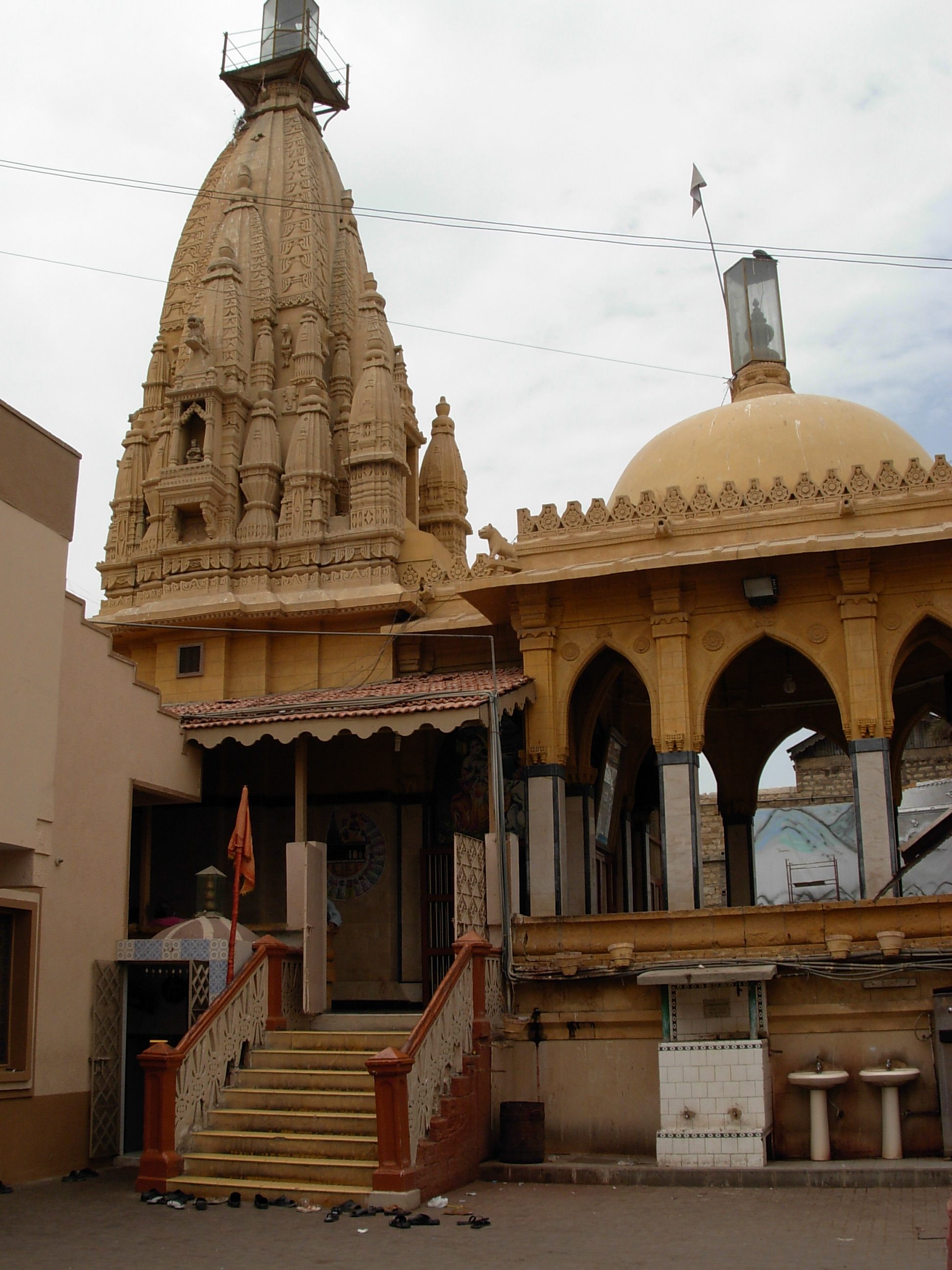
The Swaminarayan Temple in Karachi

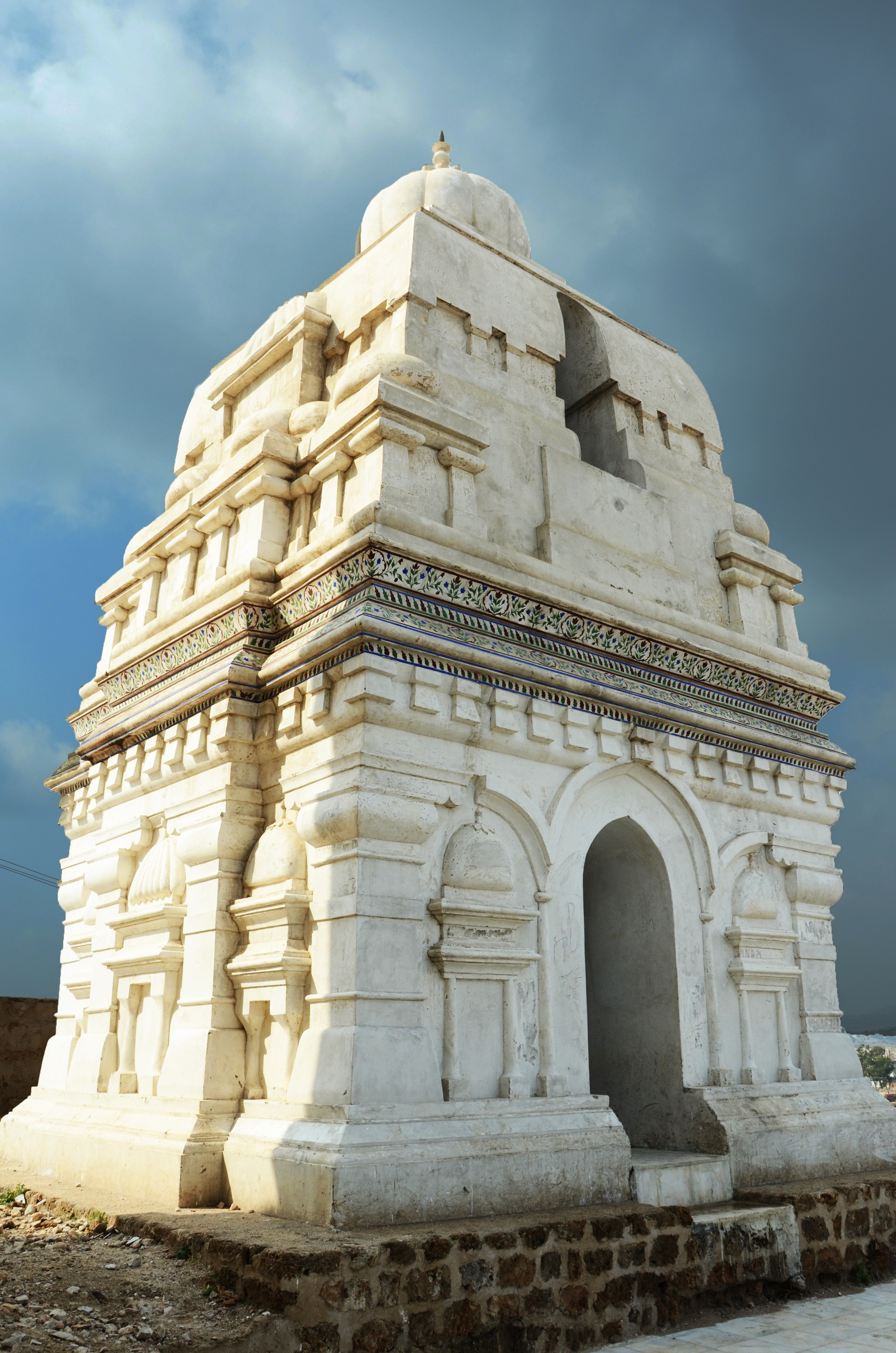
Katas Raj Temples display characteristics of Kashmiri Hindu temples.

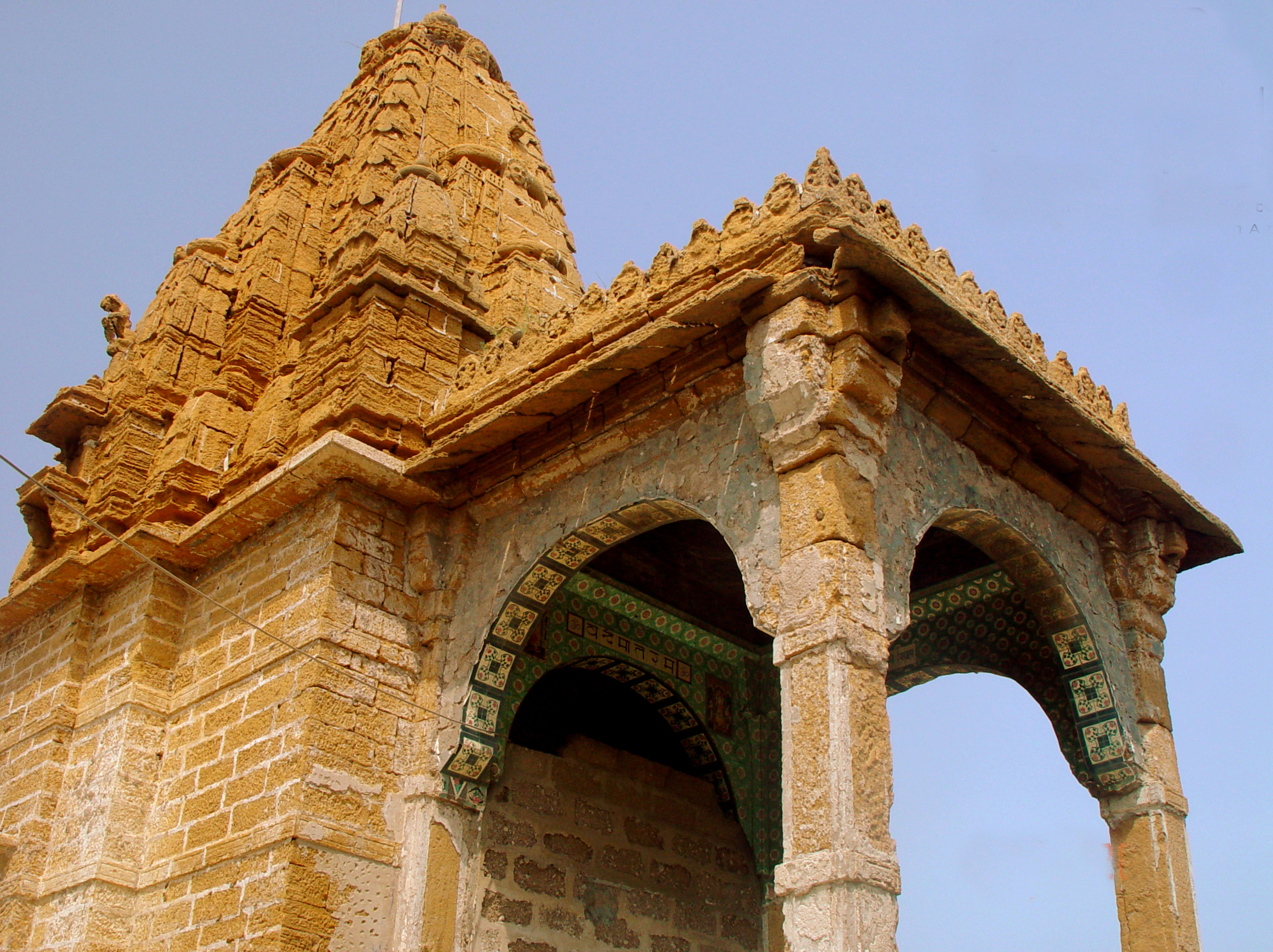
Varun Dev Mandir at Karachi

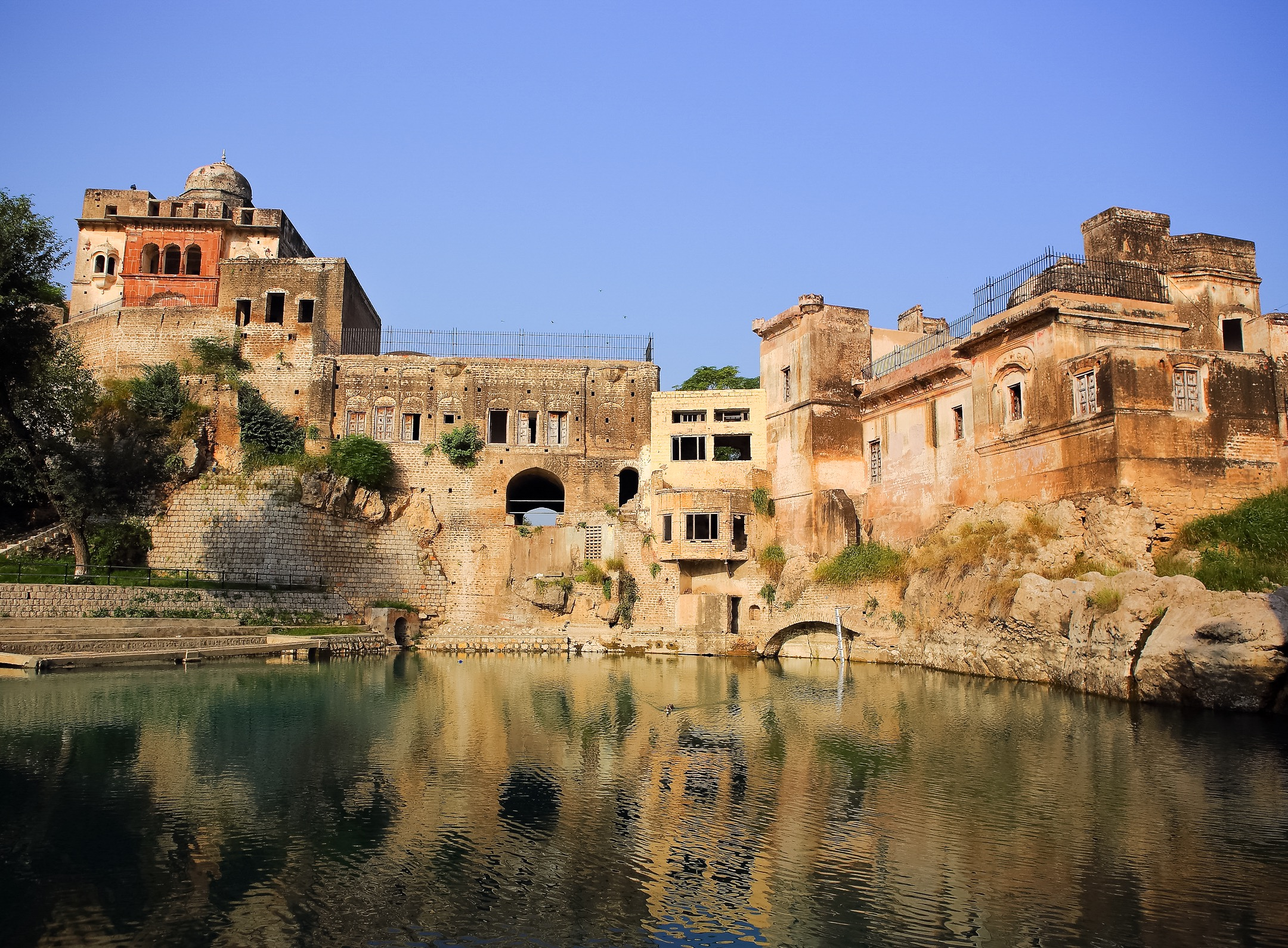
Katas Raj Temples (4th century)

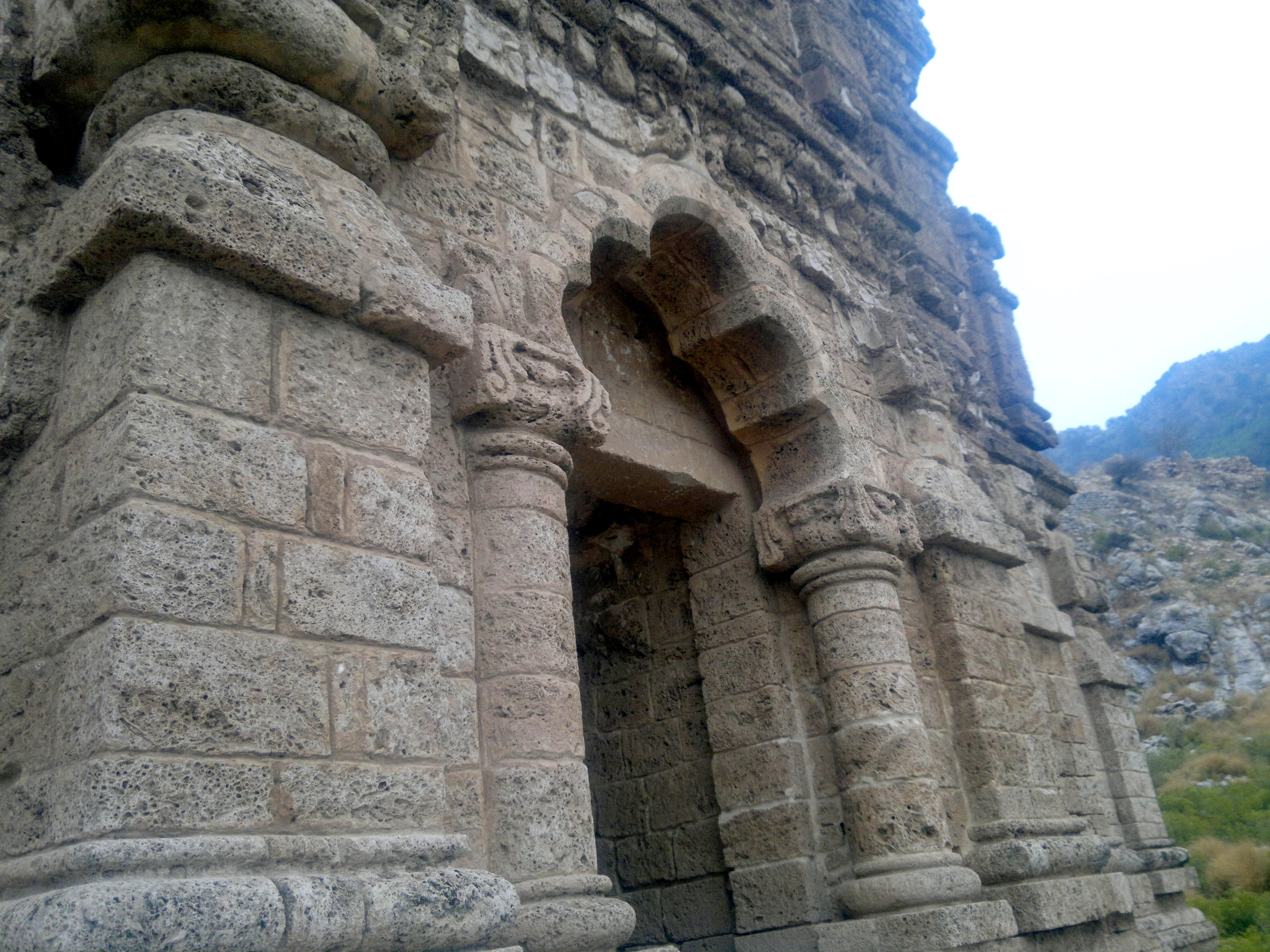
One of the Amb Temples constructed between the 7th and 9th centuries

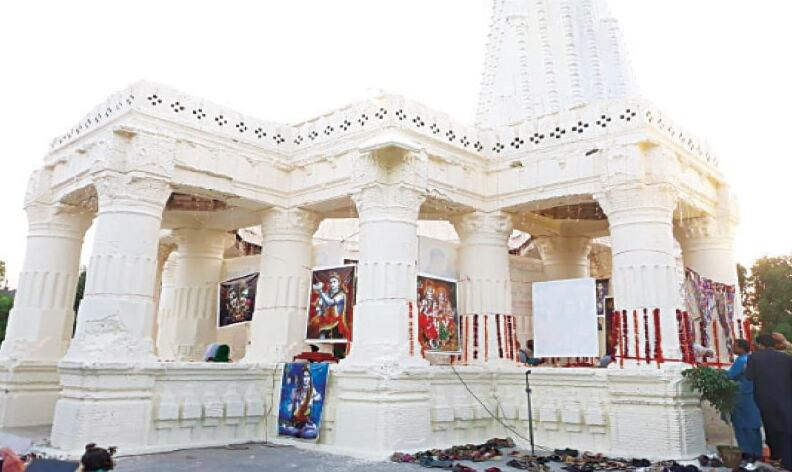
Shawala Teja Singh Temple after Renovation by the Government

=== Gurdwaras ===
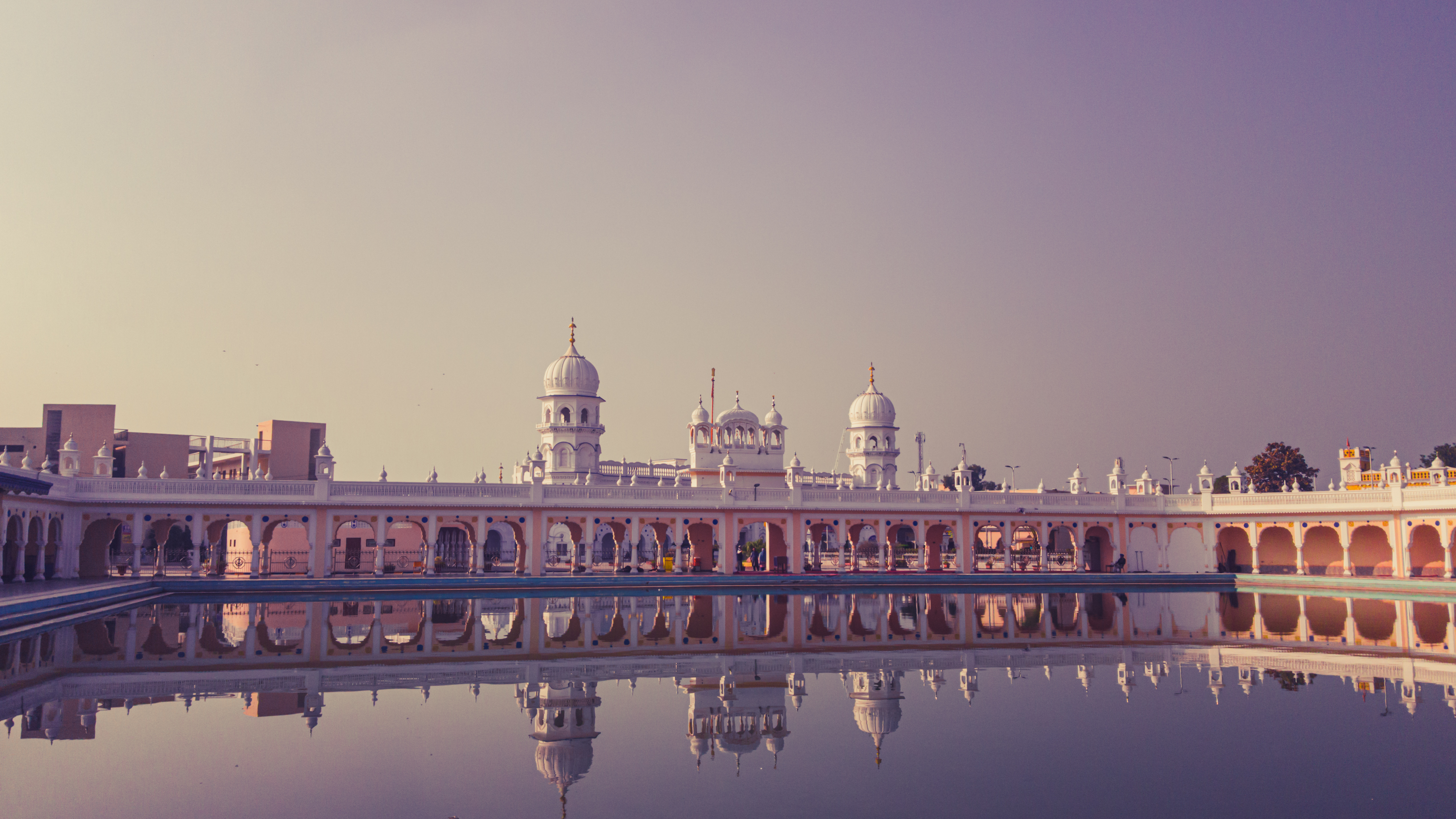
The Gurdwara Janam Asthan in Nankana Sahib

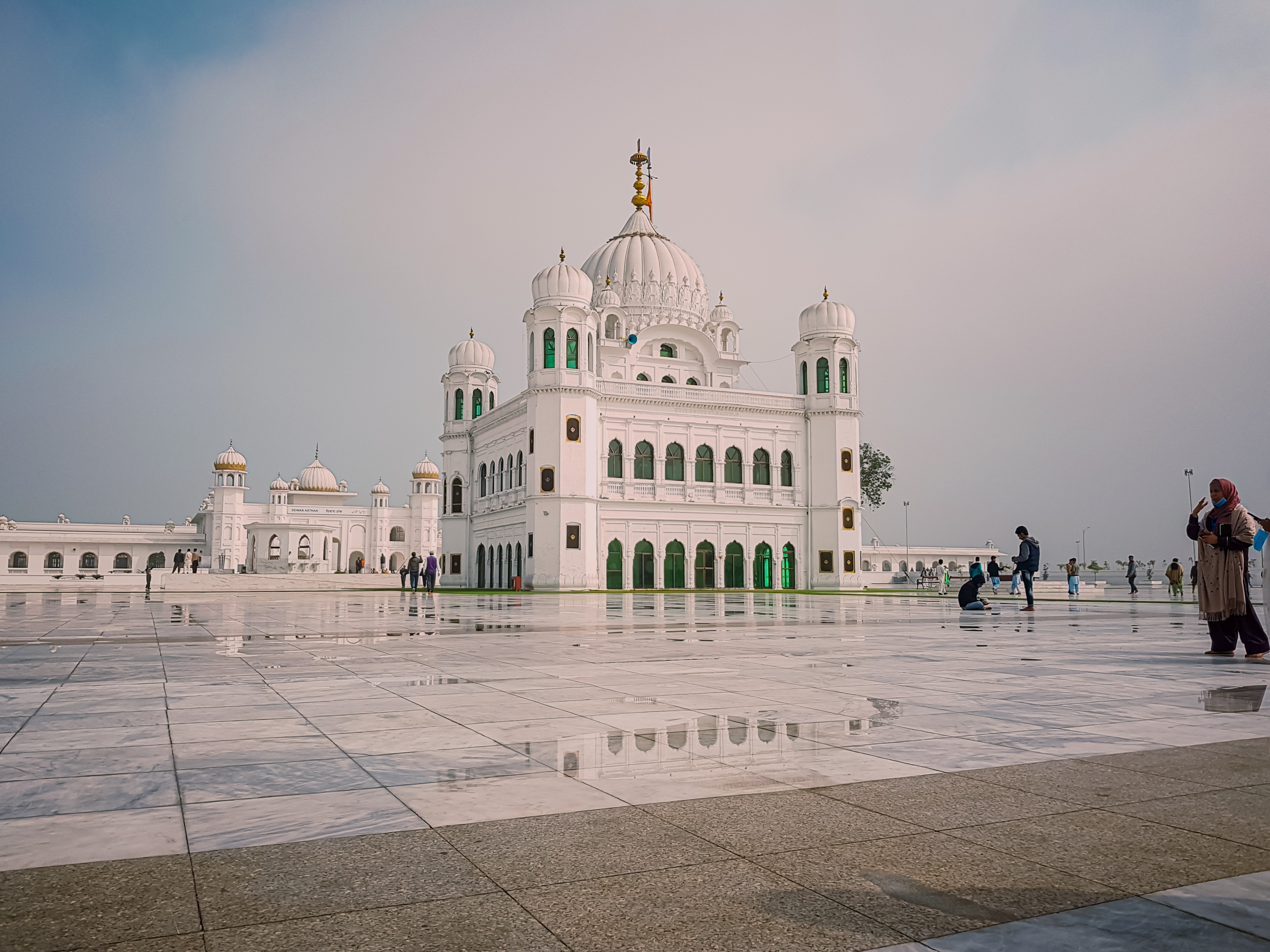
Darbar Sahib, gurdwara commemorating Guru Nanak, in Kartarpur

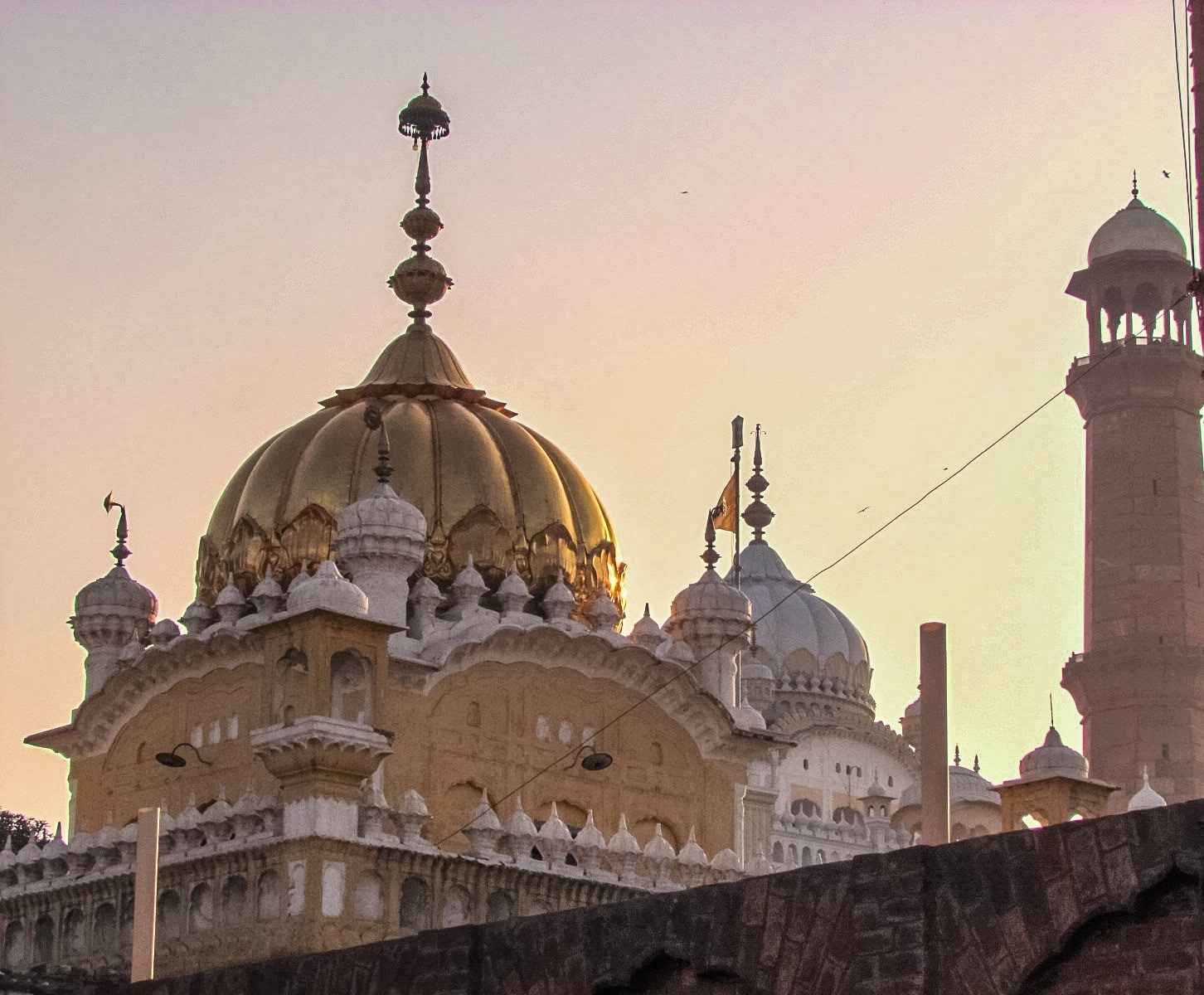
Golden dome of Gurdwara Dera Sahib in Lahore

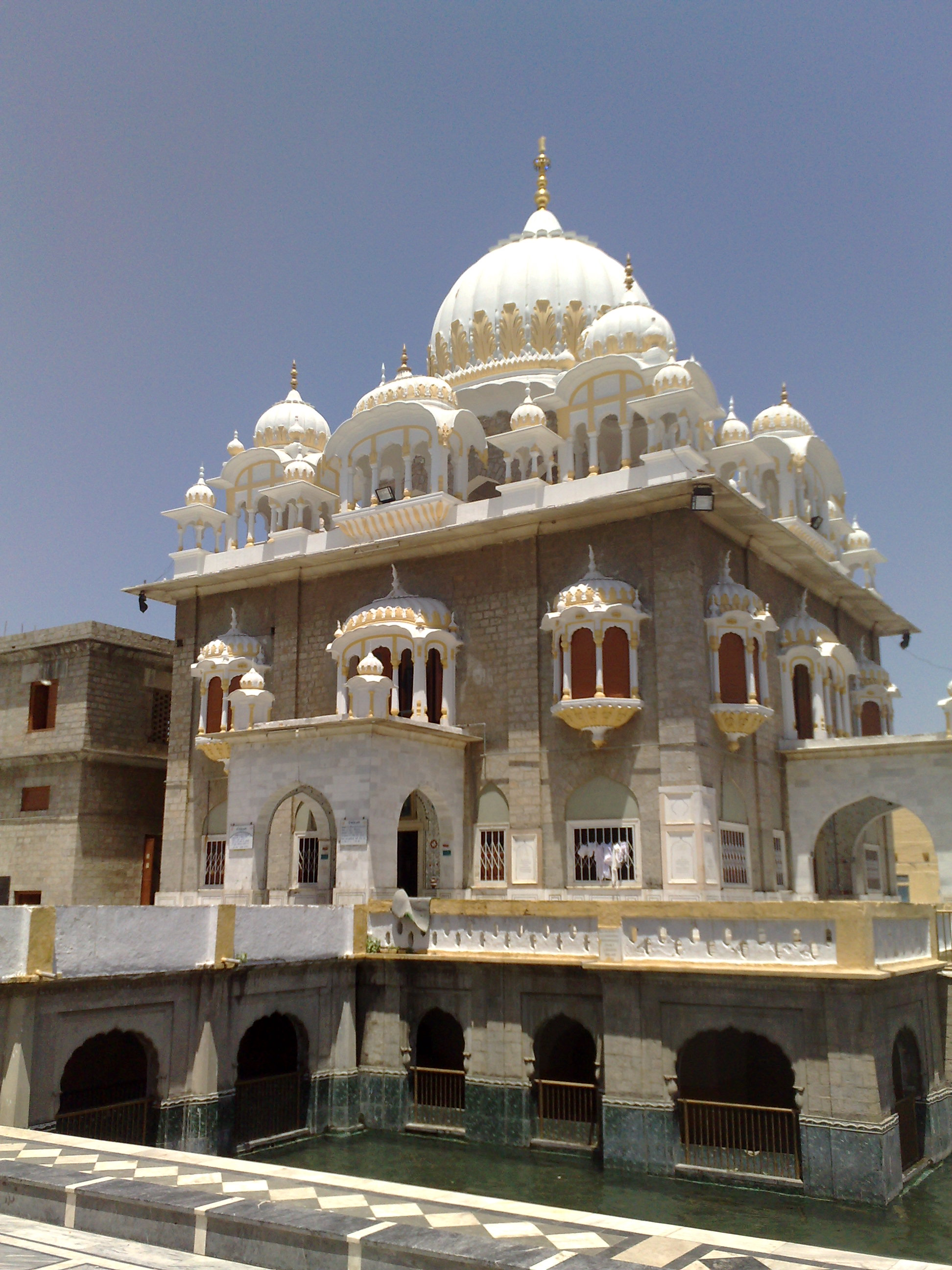
Gurdwara Panja Sahib in Punjab

=== Churches ===
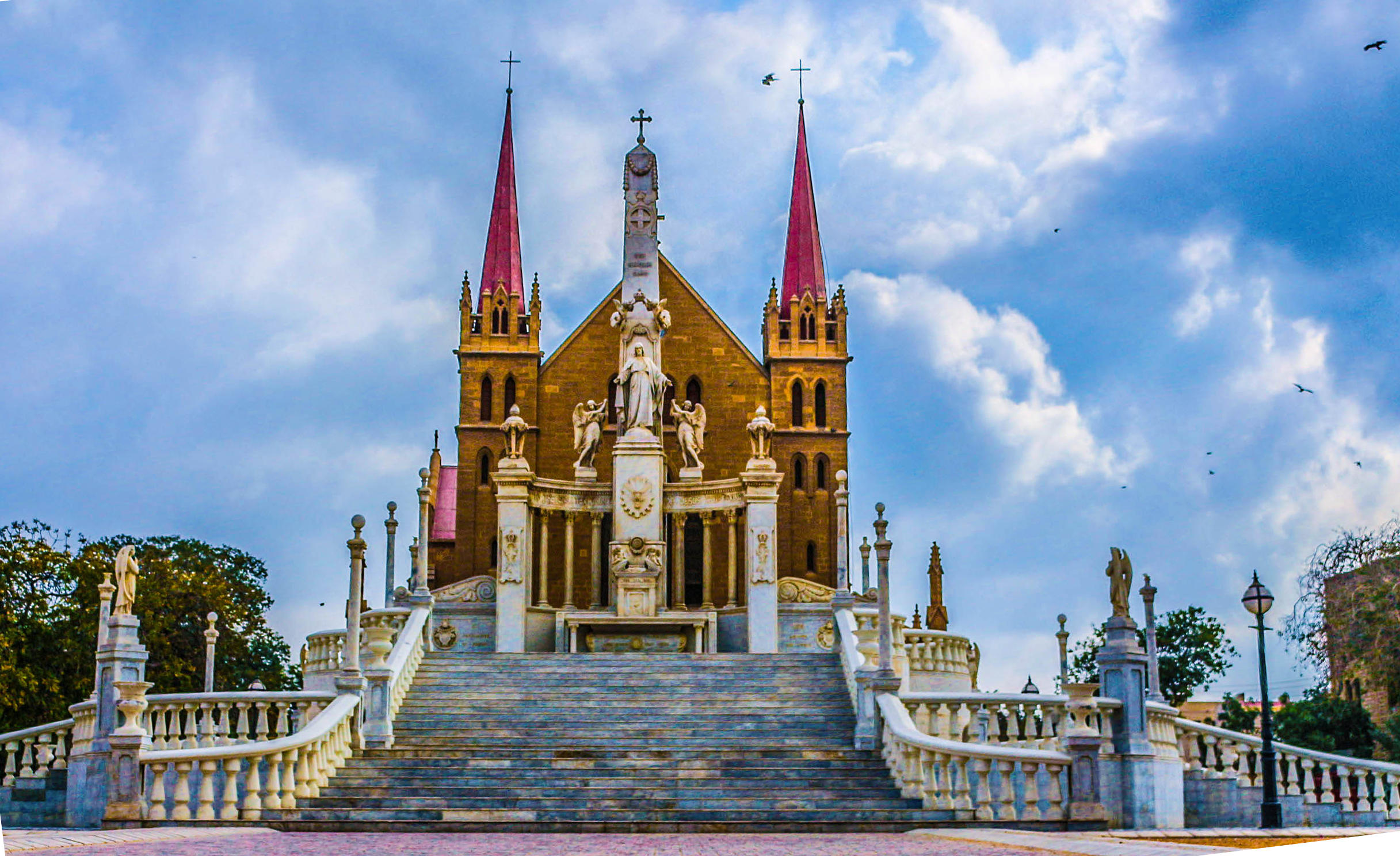
Saint Patrick's Cathedral, Karachi

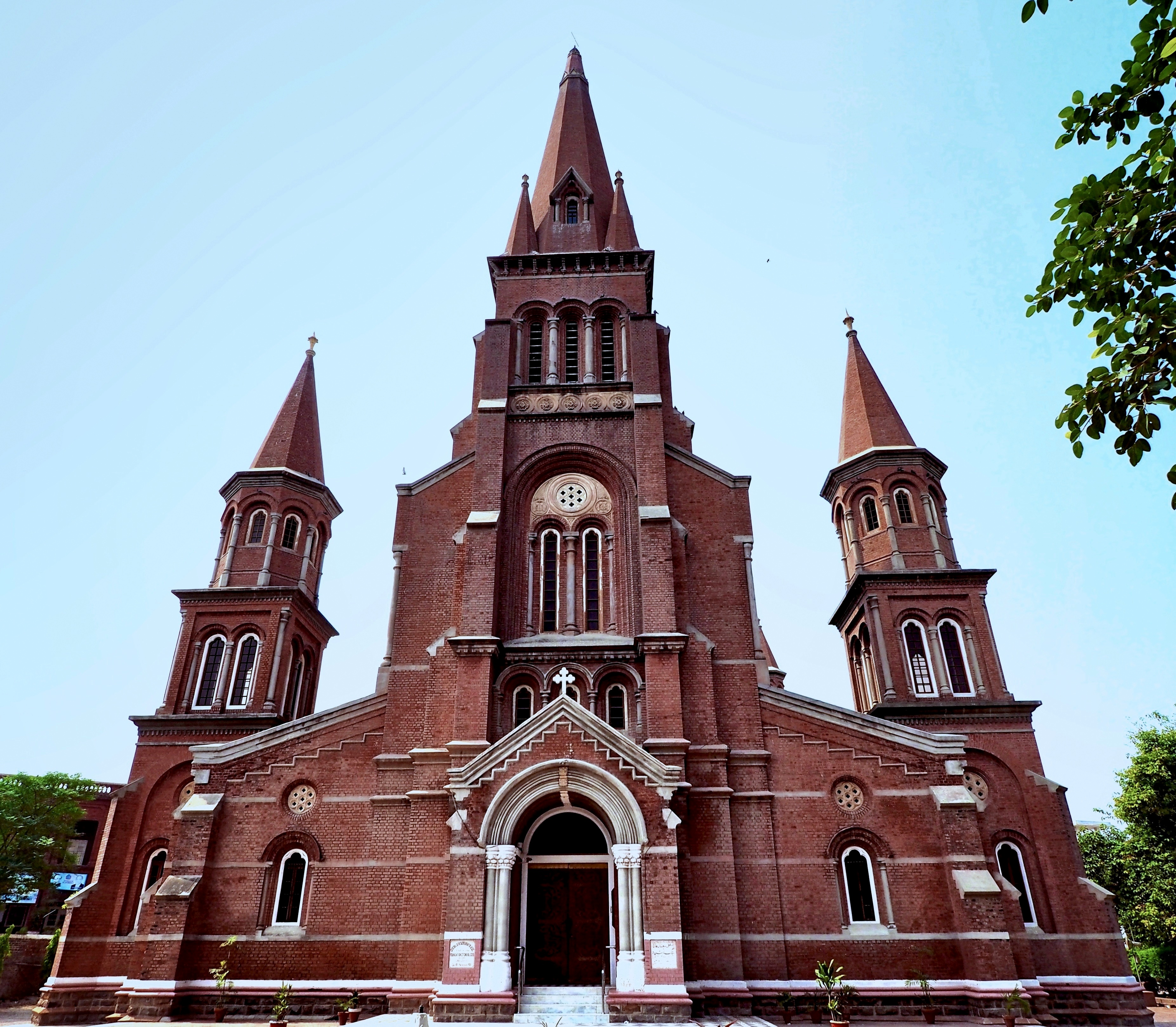
Sacred Heart Cathedral, Lahore

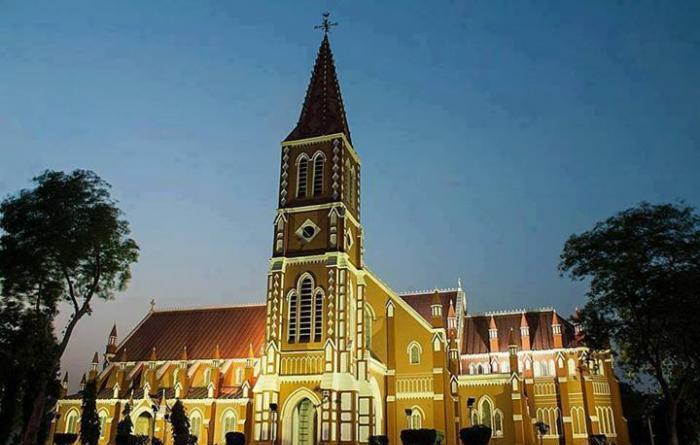
Night view of St Mary's Cathedral & Bishop's House in Multan Cantt

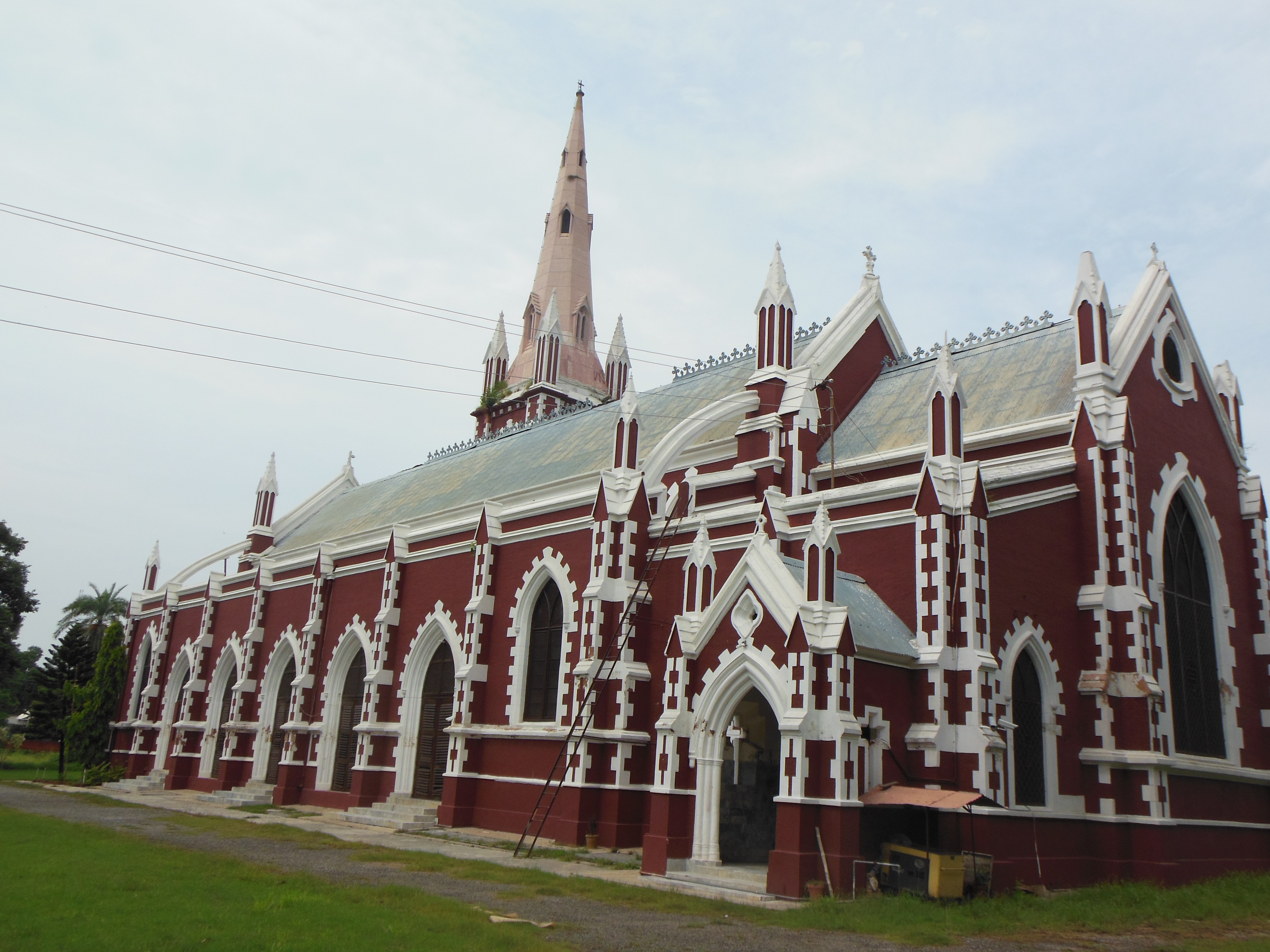
Outside of the Sialkot Cathedral

== See also ==
- 2020 Karak temple attack
- Demographics of Pakistan
- Languages of Pakistan
- Minority rights
- Hinduism in Pakistan
- Christianity in Pakistan
- Judaism in Pakistan
- Secularism in Pakistan
