= Junaid Qureshi =

Director of the European Foundation for South Asian Studies (born 1982)

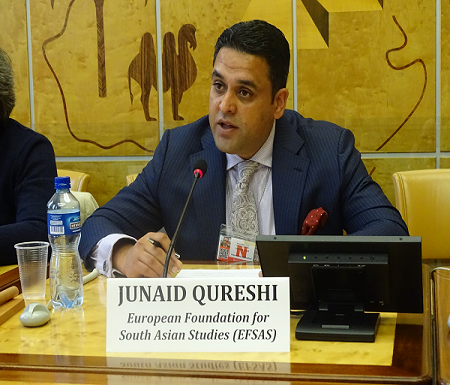
- Junaid Qureshi at the United Nations Human Rights Council
- Born: Junaid Qureshi; October 17, 1982; Srinagar, Jammu and Kashmir, India
- Education: Master's degree in International Law
- Alma mater: Vrije Universiteit Amsterdam
- Occupations: Political analyst, columnist
- Organization: European Foundation for South Asian Studies
- Known for: Director of the European Foundation for South Asian Studies (EFSAS)
- Notable work: Research and writings on the Kashmir conflict and South Asian geopolitics
- Spouse: Gousia Junaid
- Children: 2
- Website: https://www.efsas.org

Junaid Qureshi (born 17 October 1982) is the director of the European Foundation for South Asian Studies (EFSAS), a Netherlands-based policy research organisation accredited to the European Union. He is known for his research and writings on terrorism, the Kashmir conflict, and South Asian geopolitics and has raised these issues at international platforms such as the United Nations Human Rights Council (UNHRC).

== Early life and background ==
Qureshi was born in Srinagar, Jammu and Kashmir, and is the son of former JKLF member Hashim Qureshi. He has publicly distanced himself from his father's past militancy and has condemned the 1971 hijacking carried out by him, calling it an "act of terrorism."

== Education and career ==
He holds a master's degree in International Law from the VU University Amsterdam. As Director of EFSAS, Qureshi contributes research on regional security, terrorism, Jammu & Kashmir conflict and Indo-Pak relations. He has presented analyses on cross-border terrorism and political developments in South Asia during multiple sessions of the United Nations Human Rights Council, and EU Parliament.

Qureshi has delivered lectures at institutions including the British House of Commons, King's College London, University of Oxford, University of Leicester, and Vrije Universiteit Amsterdam.

He is a regular columnist for Rising Kashmir, and his analyses have appeared in prominent media outlets such as Deutsche Welle, India TV News and DNA India.

Qureshi advocates political dialogue and non-violent engagement in Jammu and Kashmir (state). He has argued that Pakistan exploits Kashmiri youth through proxy warfare, and has raised concerns regarding human rights in Pakistan-administered Kashmir. He has also researched and written on China's control over Aksai Chin and its implications for regional security.

== See also ==
- Kashmiri people
- Kashmir conflict
- Separatism
- Politics of Jammu and Kashmir
