= 2012 Kohistan Shia massacre =

Instance of sectarian violence in Khyber Pakhtunkhwa, Pakistan

- Part of sectarian violence in Pakistan
- Location: Kohistan, Khyber Pakhtunkhwa, Pakistan
- Date: 28 February 2012 (UTC+5:00)
- Target: Shia Muslims
- Attack type: Mass murder
- Deaths: 18
- Perpetrator: Jundallah
- Motive: Anti-Shia sentiment

On 28 February 2012, approximately 12 militants who were dressed in military uniforms stopped multiple buses on their routes through the Kohistan District in Khyber Pakhtunkhwa, Pakistan. 18 passengers were subsequently taken out of the buses and executed by the militants; 17 of the 18 victims were identified as Shia Muslim residents of Gilgit–Baltistan who were travelling to the city of Gilgit from Rawalpindi, Punjab, while the remaining non-Shia victim was a Sunni Muslim who failed to convince the militants that he was not Shia. The victims were killed on the basis of their religious affiliation with the Shia sect of Islam after identification. Among the dead in the massacre were three children.

Responsibility for the attack was claimed by Jundallah, a locally banned terrorist organization associated with the Tehrik-i-Taliban Pakistan. The attack was followed by nationwide protests by the Pakistani Shia community, wherein they demanded that perpetrators be caught and security be provided to the Shia minority in the Sunni-majority country.

== Background ==
Religious extremism is prevalent in Pakistan. Members of the Shia community have been targeted in a number of attacks against the Shias in the country. There have been several Incidents of killing of Shia Muslims and bomb blasts in the Shia mosque in Pakistan. The Sunni extremist groups commonly attack government and civilian targets in north-west Pakistan, along with others that they consider to be infidels. The Shias in Pakistan frequently complain that "the Pakistani state does little to stop the attacks and has even released from custody notorious militants accused of carrying them out."

== Incident ==
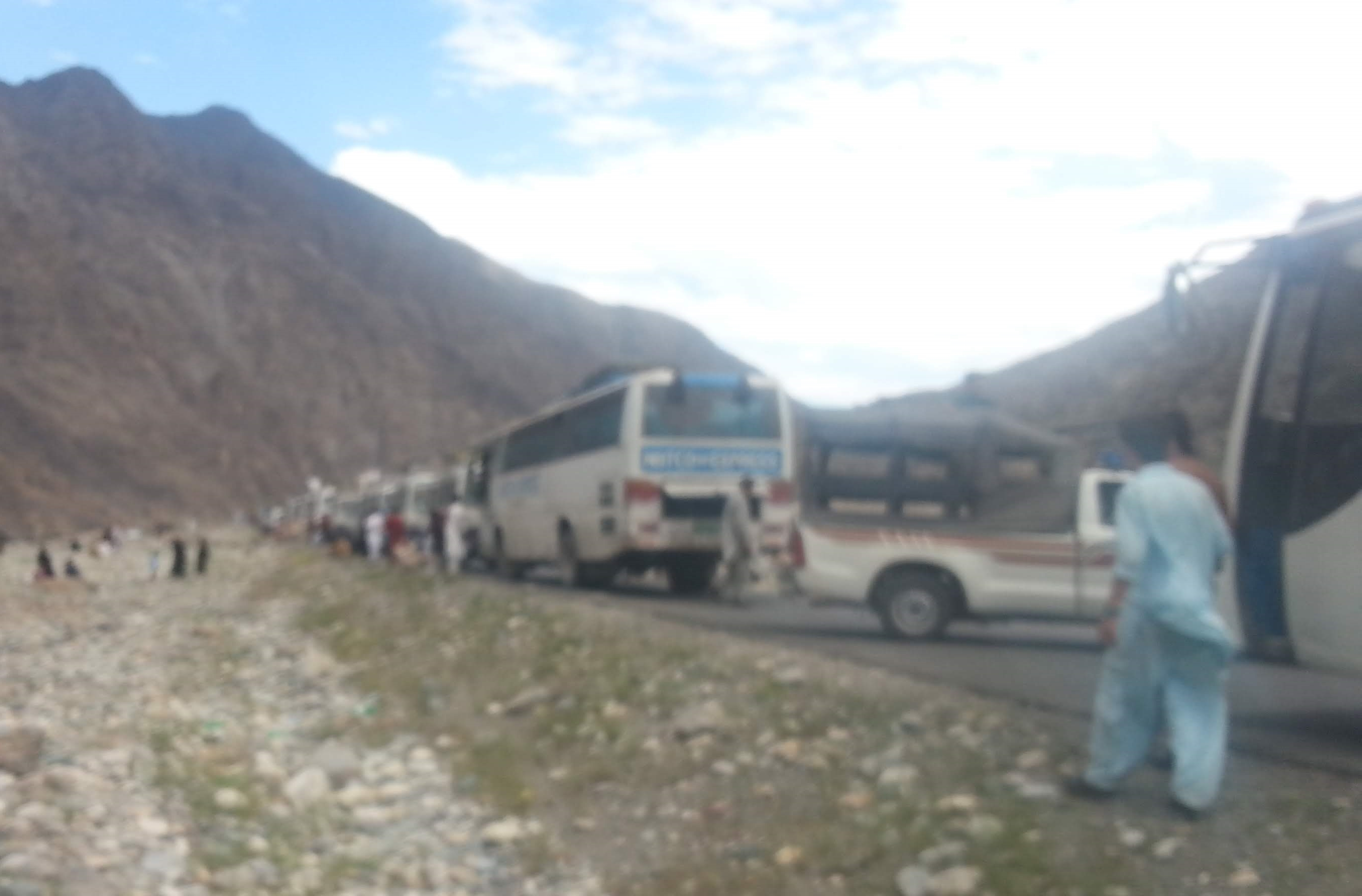
After the incident the buses used to move in groups from Rawalpindi to Gilgit and vice versa

The convoy of four buses was travelling from Rawalpindi, Punjab to Gilgit, Gilgit Baltistan. On an empty stretch of the Karakoram Highway (KKH), Kohistan, (an area with a high Sunni population), 10 to 12 gunmen in military uniform flagged the bus for stopping. After the bus halted, gunmen boarded and asked for the passengers' identity cards. After checking them, the gunmen dragged a group of Shia men including three children off the bus. They were made to stand in a line by the roadside. Their hands were tied behind their back and they were then shot. After the shooting the gunmen resorted to aerial firing and moved to the nearby hilly areas.

Among those killed was also a Sunni Muslim named Nisar Ahmed, the bus driver. He was killed along with the others as the gunmen did not believe he was a Sunni Muslim. A police official who had interviewed survivors said that "Nisar was shot dead when he erred in answer regarding Fajr prayers".

== Aftermath ==
The Federal Minister for Interior Rehman Malik told reporters that the perpetrators had been caught. However, mass protests erupted in Gilgit as locals demanded compensation of PR 5 million for relatives of each victim. An individual named Ahmad Marwat claiming to be the commander of the banned terrorist group Jundallah claimed responsibility for the act by contacting the media after the incident.

=== Protests ===
On 13 April 2012, hundreds of activists of Shia Ulema Council staged a protest demonstration against sectarian violence in Pakistan and demanded the government to provide security to the Shia community.

== Reactions ==
UN Secretary-General Ban Ki-moon "extended his heartfelt condolences to the families of the victims of the 'abhorrent attack,’ as well as to the government of Pakistan."

== See also ==
- August 2012 Mansehra Shia massacre
- 2023 Chilas Bus Attack
