= Chilas bus shooting =

2023 terrorist attack in Pakistan

- The bus after the attack

- Location: Chilas, Gilgit-Baltistan, Pakistan
- Date: 2 December 2023; 18:30 (UTC+5:00)
- Target: Passenger bus
- Attack type: Mass murder, mass shooting
- Deaths: 10
- Injuries: 25
- Motive: Terrorism

On 2 December 2023, a mass shooting was carried out against a bus in Chilas, Gilgit-Baltistan, Pakistan, killing 10 people.

== Background ==
The convoy system had been in place since 2012 for public transport travelling between Khyber Pakhtunkhwa and Gilgit-Baltistan; however, the system was halted 10 days prior to the incident.

== Shooting ==
On 2 December 2023, a K2 passenger bus departing from Ghizer to Islamabad came under severe gunfire, killing 10 people and injuring another 25. The bus was en route to Rawalpindi when gunmen opened fire in Chilas in Gilgit-Baltistan. The driver was killed on the spot, resulting in the bus colliding with an ongoing truck, causing further casualties.

== Investigation ==
On 3 December, the Diamer police filed a First Information Report (FIR) and arrested six suspects in connection with the attack. The Police Public Relations Officer confirmed that six suspects have been taken into custody at two police stations so far.

== Reaction ==
The Deputy Commissioner of Diamer stated that the passengers affected were from different parts of Pakistan, including two Pakistan Army soldiers and a Police official from the Special Protection Unit (SPU). While some sources suggest that the incident occurred due to unintended gunfire, no group has claimed responsibility for the attack.

PML-N member Maryam Nawaz strongly condemned the attack, expressing condolences for the affected families and sympathy for the martyred soldiers. She emphasized what she called the “terrorists'” attempts to disrupt Pakistan's economic progress but asserted that such actions would not impede the nation's overall advancement.
