= August 2012 Mansehra Shia massacre =

Massacre in Pakistan

August 2012 Mansehra Shia massacre refers to the massacre of 25 Shia Muslim residents of Gilgit-Baltistan travelling from the city of Rawalpindi in the province of Punjab to the city of Gilgit in the province of Gilgit Baltistan in Pakistan. The bus was stopped in Mansehra District and the people were killed after checking their identification cards which showed they were from the Shia community by individuals dressed in Military uniforms. Darra Adam Khel faction of Tehrik-i-Taliban Pakistan had claimed the responsibility for the attack.

== Background ==
Religious extremism is prevalent in Pakistan. Members of the Shia community are targeted in a number of attacks against them in the country. There have been several Incidents of killing of Shia Muslims and bomb blasts in the Shia mosque in Pakistan.

The sectarian violence incidents happened after the Islamisation policies of former military dictator President-General Zia-ul-Haq and former President Zulfikar Ali Bhutto.

== Incident ==
Three buses were travelling from Rawalpindi, Punjab to Gilgit, Gilgit Baltistan. On a section of the Karakoram Highway (KKH), in Mansehra District (an area dominated by Sunni tribes), 10 to 12 gunmen in military uniform flagged the buses for stopping. After the bus halted, the gunmen climbed on board and asked passengers for identification. They checked the identity cards of all the passengers. After which the gunmen dragged a group of Shia men. They were then sprayed with bullets from AK-47 Assault rifle.

== Response ==
The United Nations Secretary General Ban Ki-moon termed the massacre as "appalling".

== See also ==
- February 2012 Kohistan Shia massacre
