= European Foundation for South Asian Studies =

Dutch-based think tank

- Abbreviation: EFSAS
- Formation: 2016; 10 years ago
- Type: Think tank
- Legal status: nonprofit organization
- Purpose: South Asia, Terrorism, Indo-Pakistani relations and the Kashmir conflict
- Headquarters: Amsterdam, The Netherlands
- Website: www.efsas.org

The European Foundation for South Asian Studies (EFSAS) is an independent think tank and policy research institute on South Asia. The institute is located in Amsterdam, the Netherlands.

According to its website, the fundamental research of the institute concentrates on conflict resolution, India–Pakistan relations, Kashmir conflict, religious terrorism, radicalisation and extremism emanating from the region of South Asia. EFSAS also has a membership at the Civil Society Empowerment Programme. Accordingly, it is part of a consortium of various civil society organisations committed to campaigning against radicalisation and violent extremism established by the Civil Society Empowerment Programme, which is coordinated by the Radicalisation Awareness Network and funded by the European Commission's Directorate-General for Migration and Home Affairs.

== Activities ==
The institute's activities consist of publishing study papers, articles, commentaries and organizing conferences and events including annual United Nations Human Rights Council side events and interventions.
