= Persecution of Christians in Pakistan =

History of the hostility towards Christians in Pakistan

Persecution of Christians in Pakistan has been recorded since the country's independence in 1947. The persecution has taken many forms, including violence, discrimination, and blasphemy laws.

The persecution of Christians in Pakistan is a result of a number of factors, including religious extremism, sectarian violence, and the country's blasphemy laws. Religious extremism is on the rise in Pakistan, and Christian churches and schools have been targeted in attacks. The country's blasphemy laws, which are used to persecute religious minorities, have also been used to target Christians.

The Pakistani government has been criticized for its failure to protect Christians from persecution and has been accused of turning a blind eye to the persecution of Christians, and of even supporting it, including failing to prosecute those who persecute Christians.

== History ==
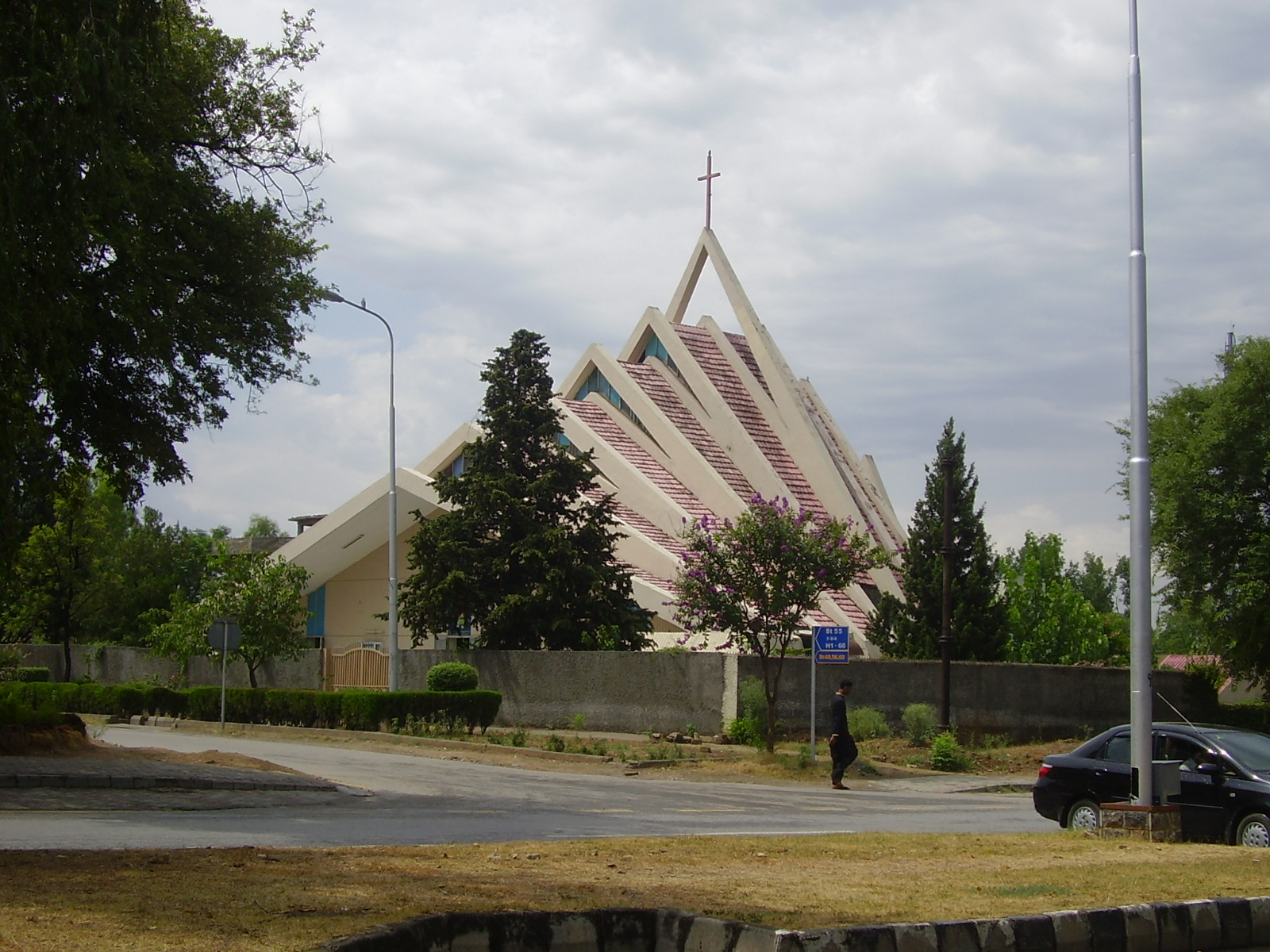
Church in Islamabad

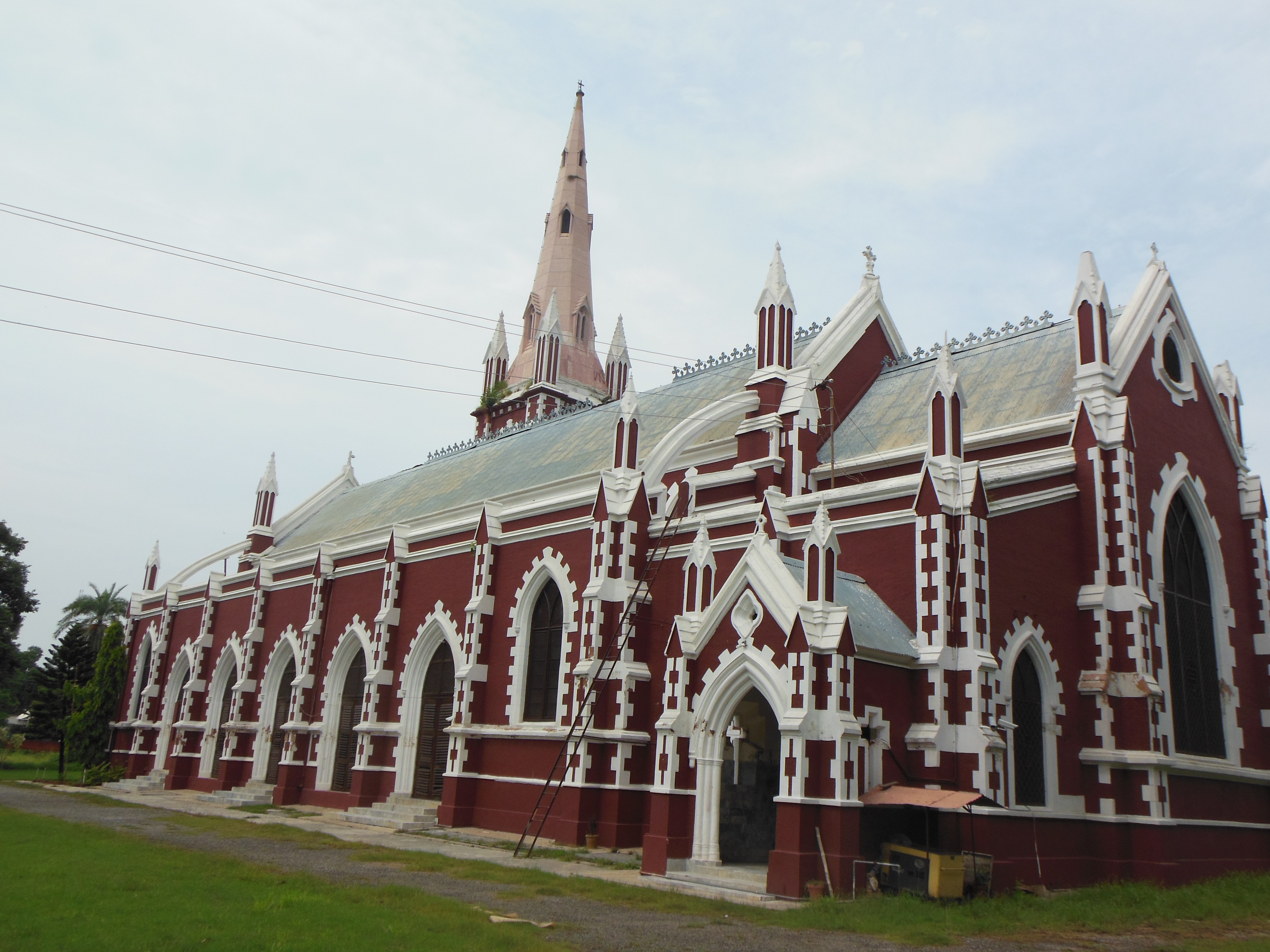
Outside of the Sialkot Cathedral

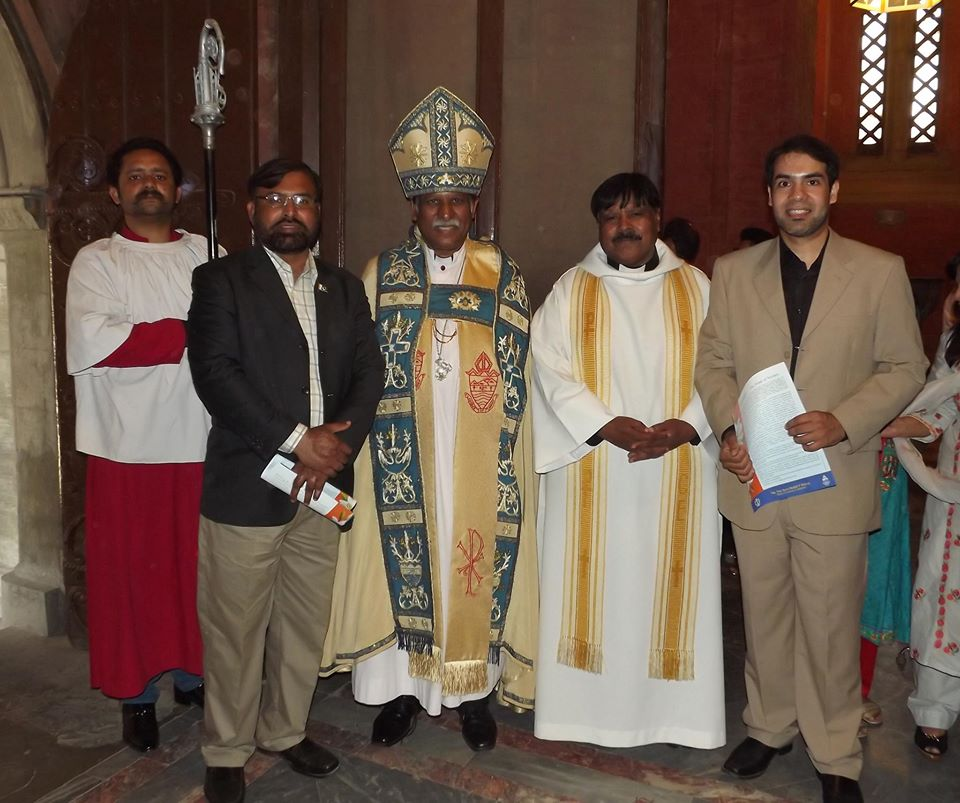
Easter celebrations at Cathedral Church of the Resurrection, Lahore

After the end of the British Raj and the independence of Pakistan in 1947, many Sikhs were forced to migrate to an independent India. Many Christians worked under Sikh landlords and when they departed the western parts of the Punjab region, the Government of Pakistan appropriated Sikh property to Muslims arriving from East Punjab. This caused over 300,000 Christians in Pakistan to become homeless. On top of that, rogue Muslims threatened Christians that Pakistan was made for Muslims only and that if Christians wanted to stay there, they had to live a life of servitude and perform sanitation work. Some Christians were therefore murdered for refusing to pick up garbage. In 1951, seventy-two Muslims were charged with the murder of eleven Christians after communal riots over agricultural land erupted.

Many churches built during the colonial Indian period, prior to the partition, remain locked, with the Pakistani government refusing to hand them over to the Christian community. Others have been victims of church arsons or demolitions. In 1971, East Pakistan became independent as Bangladesh, and the majority of Pakistan's Hindus, who lived in Bangladesh, were severed from Pakistan. Pakistan became a culturally monolithic, increasingly Islamic state, with smaller religious minorities than ever.

With the governments of Zulfikar Ali Bhutto and Zia ul-Haq, more stringently Islamic laws transformed Pakistan. Conversion to other faiths than Islam is not prohibited by law. Muslims who change their faith to Christianity, are subject to societal pressure. Extremely controversial were the blasphemy laws, which made it treacherous for non-Muslims to express themselves without being accused of being un-Islamic. Zia also introduced the Sharia as a basis for lawmaking, reinforced by Nawaz Sharif in 1991. Coerced conversions to Islam from Christianity are a major source of concern for Pakistani Christians, and the minority faces threats, harassment and intimidation tactics from extremists. The Christian community in Pakistan encounters significant challenges, discrimination, and persecution solely based on their religious identity. The law enforcement and justice system, as well as the presence of "blasphemy" laws and bonded labor, are often exploited to target, trap, and imprison religious minorities, with a particular focus on Christians.

=== Discrimination in the Constitution ===
Christians, along with other non-Muslim minorities, are discriminated against in the Constitution of Pakistan. Non-Muslims are barred from becoming President or Prime Minister. Furthermore, they are barred from being judges in the Federal Shariat Court, which has the power to strike down any law deemed un-Islamic. In 2019, Naveed Amir, a Christian member of National assembly moved a bill to amend the article 41 and 91 of the Constitution, which would allow non-Muslims to become Prime Minister and President of Pakistan. However, Pakistan's parliament blocked the bill

In 2019, a Christian journalist quit the channel Dunya News after she was allegedly persecuted for her faith by co-workers and insulted for not converting to Islam.

=== Blasphemy laws ===
Several hundred Christians, along with Muslims themselves (though much fewer in comparison), have been prosecuted under Pakistan's blasphemy laws, and death sentences have been handed out to at least a dozen.

Pakistani law mandates that any "blasphemies" of the Quran are to be met with punishment. On July 28, 1994, Amnesty International urged Pakistan's Prime Minister, Benazir Bhutto to change the law because it was being used to terrorize religious minorities. She tried but was unsuccessful. However, she modified the laws to make them more moderate. Her changes were reversed by the Nawaz Sharif administration. Some people accused of blasphemy have been killed in prison or shot dead in court, and even if pardoned, may remain in danger from imams in their local village. Pakistan as the fifth worst violator of religious freedom out of the top fifty countries included in the analysis.

Ayub Masih, a Christian, was convicted of blasphemy and sentenced to death in 1998. He was accused by a neighbor of stating that he supported British writer Salman Rushdie, author of The Satanic Verses. Lower appeals courts upheld the conviction. However, before the Pakistan Supreme Court, his lawyer was able to prove that the accuser had used the conviction to force Masih's family off their land and then acquired control of the property. Masih has been released.

On September 22, 2006, a Pakistani Christian named Shahid Masih was arrested and jailed for allegedly violating Islamic "blasphemy laws" in the country of Pakistan. He is at present held in confinement and has expressed fear of reprisals by Islamic fundamentalists. (Note that the name "Masih", which comes from Arabic المسيحيين Al-Masihiyyin, "Christians", is a common surname in Pakistan and India among Christians.)

In November 2010, Asia Bibi was sentenced to death by hanging for "blasphemy"; the sentence has to be upheld in higher court before it can be executed. Bibi was acquitted in 2018.

In August 2012, Rimsha Masih, a Christian girl, reportedly 11 or 14 years old, and an illiterate with mental disabilities was accused of blasphemy for burning pages from a book containing Quranic verses. The allegation came from a Muslim cleric who himself has subsequently been accused by the police of framing the girl. The girl, and later the cleric, were both arrested and released on bail.

In July 2013 Shagufta Kausar and Shafqat Emmanuel, a Christian couple, were arrested and charged with blasphemy for allegedly sending a text message in English, that was considered offensive of Mohammed. Both members of the couple are illiterate and do not speak English. Sentenced to death, they remained on death row for eight years before their sentence was overturned. Unable to remain in Pakistan, for lack of safety, they were granted asylum in a European country.

In 2018, Amoon, 42, and Qaiser Ayub, 45, both Christians, were convicted of blasphemy and given the death penalty. Authorities were alerted a WordPress.com blog in 2011 that violated the country's blasphemy laws. The blog, allegedly created by a Muslim man close to the brothers who argued with them over their sister, publicly displayed their contact information, and was used in their conviction, despite acknowledging that anyone could've created the blog and both brothers' denying their part in the blog's creation. The courts upheld the verdict in sentence in 2022.

Christian communities in Pakistan are frequently marginalized, experiencing high levels of poverty and engagement in low-skilled occupations. Incidents targeting their residential neighborhoods and places of worship primarily stem from the contentious blasphemy laws prevalent in the country.

In July 2024 a man in his early 20s was sentenced to death under the blasphemy law for sharing images of burned pages of the Quran, in the context of the Jaranwala riots of 2023. Father Khalid Rashid, director of the National Commission for Justice and Peace for the Diocese of Faisalabad said the man was uneducated and did not understand the scope of his actions. "He is innocent because he is not well educated. He is from a very poor family. Sometimes people do not understand these things – he had no idea that by sharing this content it would be considered harmful. During those days everybody shared the news.”

On 18 September 2024 former nurse Shagufta Kiran, a Christian, was sentenced to death for allegedly sharing blasphemous messages on WhatsApp. She denied being the author of the messages.

Two Christian nurses were formally acquitted of blasphemy charges in 2025. Mariam Lal and Newosh Arooj had been accused by a doctor of defiling a sticker with an Islamic inscription on a cupboard in the hospital. A district judge acquitted the pair in November 2025, stating that the complainant had failed to substantiate the charge. The deadline for appealing the decision passed in January 2026.

=== Forced conversions ===
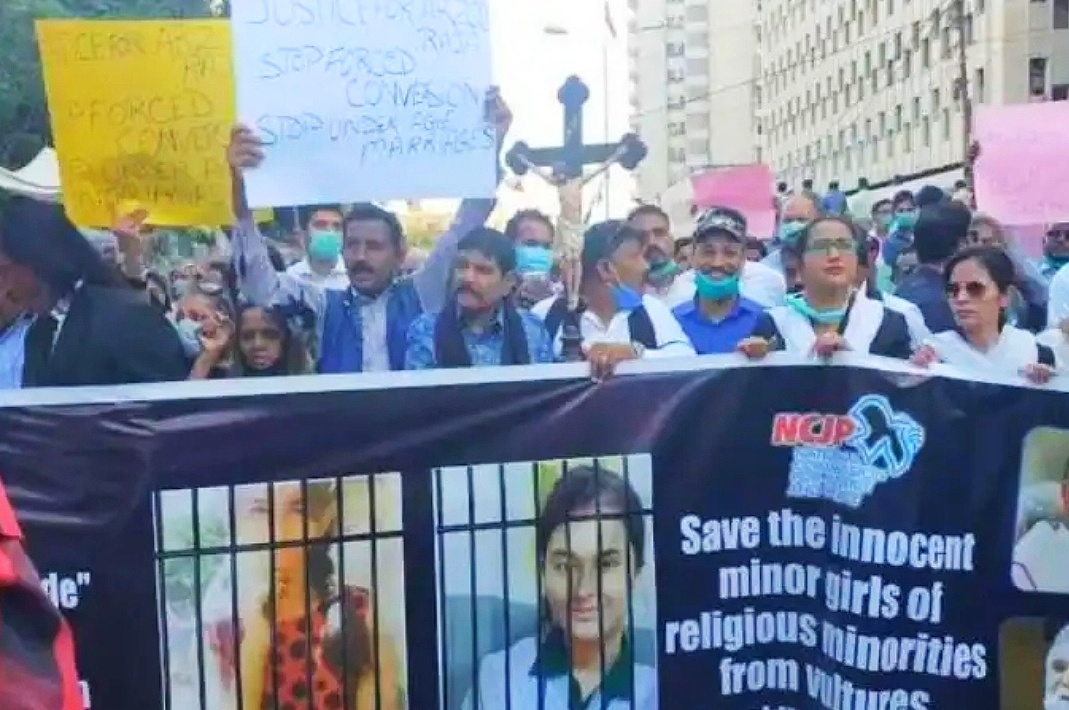
Protest against forced conversion of Christian girls in Pakistan organised by NCJP

In October 2020, the Pakistani High Court upheld the validity of a forced marriage between 44-year-old Ali Azhar and 13-year-old Christian Arzoo Raja. Raja was abducted by Azhar, forcibly wed to Azhar and then forcibly converted to Islam by Azhar. Human rights organizations estimate that upwards of 1,000 Christian, Hindu, and Sikh girls are abducted each year. A large portion of them are then forced to convert to Islam. It is taking a long time for the Pakistani government to understand this problem, which is causing huge damage to the country's reputation also Pakistan has failed to ensure the safety and dignity of women from religious minorities, a situation experts have described as a national and international tragedy.

=== Forced displacements ===
Since 2014, the Capital Development Authority (CDA), a public benefit corporation responsible for providing municipal services in Islamabad, has been targeting and demolishing illegal slums who are largely occupied by Christians in the city. The Supreme Court put on hold the demolitions and ordered from the CDA a written justification to it. The CDA's replied that "Most of these katchi abadies [slums] are under the occupation of the Christian community." "It seems this pace of occupation of land by Christian community may increase. Removal of katchi abadies is very urgent to provide [a] better environment to the citizen[s] of Islamabad and to protect the beauty of Islamabad ." Various human rights activists condemned the response.

On November 9, 2020 Yasmin Masih and her son Usman Masih, both Christians, were murdered in Ahmad Nagar Chattha by Hussain Shakoor, a Muslim.

In May 2021, Muslim nurses in Mental Government Hospital in Lahore occupied the Christian hospital chapel and raised Islamic slogans. Christian nurses, who use the chapel daily for prayer, pleaded for their protection.

=== Muslim extremist violence against Christians ===
Christians in Pakistan report being targeted by Tehrik-i-Taliban Pakistan.

On 9 August 2002 gunmen threw grenades into a chapel on the grounds of the Taxila Christian Hospital in northern Punjab, 24 kilometres (15 miles) west of Islamabad, killing four, including two nurses and a paramedic, and wounding 25 men and women. On 25 September 2002, unidentified Muslim gunmen shot dead six people at a Christian charity in Karachi's central business district. They entered the third-floor offices of the Institute for Peace and Justice (IPJ) and shot their victims in the head. All of the victims were Pakistani Christians. Karachi police chief Tariq Jamil said the victims had their hands tied and their mouths had been covered with tape. On 25 December 2002, several days after an Islamic cleric called for Muslims to kill Christians, two burqa-clad Muslim gunmen tossed a grenade into a Presbyterian church during a Christian sermon in Chianwala in east Pakistan, killing three girls.

After the Karachi killings, Shahbaz Bhatti, the head of the All Pakistan Minority Alliance, told BBC News Online, "We have become increasingly victimised since the launch of the US-led international War on Terror. It is, therefore, the responsibility of the international community to ensure that the government protects us."

In November 2005, 3,000 militant Islamists attacked Christians in Sangla Hill in Pakistan and destroyed Roman Catholic, Salvation Army and United Presbyterian churches. The attack was over allegations of violation of blasphemy laws by a Pakistani Christian named Yousaf Masih. The attacks were condemned by some political parties in Pakistan. However, Pakistani Christians have expressed disappointment that they have not received justice. Samson Dilawar, a parish priest in Sangla Hill, said the police have not committed to trial any of those arrested for committing the assaults, and the Pakistani government did not inform the Christian community that a judicial inquiry was underway by a local judge. He said that Muslim clerics still "make hateful speeches about Christians" and "continue insulting Christians and our faith".

In February 2006, churches and Christian schools were targeted in protests over publication of the Jyllands-Posten cartoons in Denmark, leaving two elderly women injured and many homes and much property destroyed. Some of the mobs were stopped by police, but not all. On June 5, 2006, a Pakistani Christian stonemason named Nasir Ashraf was working near Lahore when he drank water from a public facility using a glass chained to the facility. He was immediately assaulted by Muslims for "polluting the glass". A mob gathered and beat Ashraf, calling him a "Christian dog". Bystanders encouraged the beating, saying it was a "good" deed that would help the attackers get into heaven. Ashraf was hospitalized. In August 2006, a church and Christian homes were attacked in a village outside of Lahore in a land dispute. Three Christians were seriously injured and one reported missing after about 35 Muslims burned buildings, desecrated Bibles and attacked Christians. Based, in part, on such incidents, Pakistan was recommended by the U.S. Commission on International Religious Freedom (USCIRF) in May 2006 to be designated as a "Country of Particular Concern" (CPC) by the Department of State.

In July 2008, a mob stormed a Protestant church during a prayer service on the outskirts of Pakistan's largest city, Karachi, denouncing the Christians as "infidels" and injuring several, including a pastor.

The 2009 Gojra riots was a series of violent pogroms against Christian minorities by Muslims. In June 2009, International Christian Concern reported the rape and killing of a Christian man in Pakistan, for refusing to convert to Islam. In March 2011, Shahbaz Bhatti was killed by gunmen after he spoke out against Pakistan's blasphemy laws. The UK increased financial aid to the country, sparking criticism of British foreign secretary William Hague. Cardinal Keith O’Brien stated, "To increase aid to the Pakistan government when religious freedom is not upheld and those who speak up for religious freedom are gunned down is tantamount to an anti-Christian foreign policy." The Catholic Church in Pakistan requested that Pope Benedict declare martyrdom of Shahbaz Bhatti.

At least 20 people, including police officials, were wounded as 500 Muslim demonstrators attacked the Christian community in Gujranwala city on 29 April 2011, Minorities Concern of Pakistan has learnt. During a press conference in Karachi, the largest city of Pakistan, on 30 May 2011, Maulana Abdul Rauf Farooqi and other clerics of Jamiat-Ulema-e-Islam quoted “immoral Biblical stories” and demanded to ban the Bible. Maulana Farooqi said, “Our lawyers are preparing to ask the court to ban the book.”

On 23 September 2012, a mob of protesters in Mardan, angry at the anti Islamic film Innocence of Muslims, reportedly "set on fire the church, St Paul's high school, a library, a computer laboratory and houses of four clergymen, including Bishop Peter Majeed." and went on to rough up Zeeshan Chand, the pastor's son. On 12 October 2012, Ryan Stanton, a Christian boy of 16 went into hiding after being accused of blasphemy and after his home was ransacked by a crowd. Stanton stated that he had been framed because he had rebuffed pressures to convert to Islam.

On Saturday, 11 June 2022, Pst. Shamoon Francis Gill and Ex. District Member Amanat Masih, Elder Aneel Amanat and accompanied by some of church of God members, to Sardara Abad Korakh Chowk Mardan where the prayer center construction was in progress. 800 to 900 group of Anarchist people. The leader of that group did a hateful speech against Christian and said that they have no right to build church or prayer center in any areas of Mardan, anarchist group had sticks and batons in their hands after that speech they attacked on us; the work of the prayer center was forcibly stopped, and the goods were lying there taken away by Anarchist group. They humiliated a lot and tried to kill them. Then the police also came to the incident, and they rescue the victims from anarchist group of people, but the other side police also supported this anarchist group, and they accept the deal to stop prayer center construction work and support their mandate. June 11, 2022, on same day in evening Pastor Shamoon Francis Gill and his wife (Saima Amanat) went to the police station to file a report forcibly. They were still threatened by the anarchist group.

In March 2013, Muslims attacked a Christian neighbourhood in Lahore, where more than 100 houses were burned after a Christian was alleged to have made blasphemous remarks. On 22 September 2013, 75 Christians were killed in a suicide attack at the historic All Saints Church in the old quarter of the regional capital, Peshawar.

On 14 February 2014 Muslims stormed the Church building and attacked school property in Multan. They were led by Anwar Khushi, a Muslim gangster who struck a deal with the local people's spokesperson. They seized the Church property and displaced the people and deprived them of their building.

On 15 March 2015, two blasts took place at a Roman Catholic Church and a Christ Church during Sunday service at Youhanabad town of Lahore. At least 15 people were killed and seventy were wounded in the attacks.

On 27 March 2016, at least 70 were killed and over 340 wounded when a suicide bomber targeting Christians celebrating Easter attacked a playground in Lahore. The Pakistani Taliban claimed responsibility for the bombing.

On 17 December 2017, a bomb killed nine and injured fifty-seven. The Islamic State of Iraq and the Levant took responsibility.

On August 16, 2023, twenty-six Christian churches in Jaranwala, Punjab, Pakistan were burnt down by acts of arson, and homes belonging to Christian families were looted and destroyed by Muslim rioters.

On 25 May 2024, Mr Nazir Gill Masih, who owned a shoe factory in Gillwala Mujahid colony in Sargodha, Punjab, was beaten after a false accusation of having burnt pages of the Quran. The rest of the family managed to escape, but Mr Nazir was badly beaten and died of his injuries ten days later. Pakistani bishop Samson Shukardin, president of the Pakistani Bishops' Conference, urged the Government to pass legislation to curb false accusations of blasphemy, including prison sentences. The Catholic Church’s National Commission for Justice and Peace (NCJP) said that "swift and impartial justice must be served to restore faith in the legal system" asking authorities to "hold police officials accountable for their inaction” and demanding that “no false blasphemy charges be registered against any Christian and that protection be provided to them”. Although she managed to escape from the lynching, Mr Masih's wife, Alla Rakhi, fell into a deep depression because of the events, and died a few weeks later.

On 29 December 2024 Suleman Masih, 24, was attacked, beaten and shot in Gujranwala. He died from his injuries on 1 January 2025. A fact-finding mission by the National Commission for Justice and Peace found the case to have been motivated by religious discrimination.

On 22 March 2025 Waqas Masih, 22, was found brutally beaten by his employer, allegedly for resisting his attempts of conversion to Islam.

On 2 March 2026 Marqas Masih, 22, was found hanged on a farm where he worked as a labourer. His employer called his family and said he had committed suicide. When relatives retrieved his body and prepared it for burial, they noticed cuts, bruises and other marks considered consistent with torture. Police intervened following protests from the Christian community and eventually arrested the owner of the farm and another man.

In July 2026 Catholic bishops in Pakistan protested the fact that no justice has been served in the case of a Christian man and his pregnant wife who were attacked and burned alive in a brick kiln, in 2014.

In September 2026 the National Commission for Justice and Peace published a report detailing dozens of cases of human rights violations of Christians and other minority religions in Pakistan over the year 2025.

Forced conversions of Christian children are known to occur, and if a child resists, they can be raped, beaten, or bullied.

=== By province ===
Province	Percentage of Christians (in 2017)	Population as per 1998 Census
Balochistan	0.27%	31,200
Federally Administered Tribal Areas	0.06%	2,306
Khyber Pakhtunkhwa	0.15%	36,668
Punjab	1.88%	1,699,843
Sindh	0.85%	294,885
Islamabad Capital Territory	4.34%	32,738
Total	1.27%	2,092,902

== See also ==
- Freedom of religion in Pakistan
- Secularism in Pakistan
