= Rimsha Masih blasphemy case =

Pakistani girl from Islamabad

Rimsha Masih (Urdu: رمشا مسیح — some early reports used the first name "Rifta" or "Riftah"; born 1998) is a Pakistani girl from Islamabad, who was arrested by the Pakistani police on blasphemy charges in August 2012 when she was 14 years old. The alleged charges included desecrating pages of the Quran (or a book containing verses from the Quran) by burning—a crime punishable by death under Pakistan's blasphemy law. She is a member of Pakistan's Christian minority.

Two weeks after her arrest, the local imam who had reported her to police was arrested on suspicion of planting pages of religious texts in Rimsha's bag. Rimsha was eventually acquitted of all charges. In mid 2013 after months of hiding, Rimsha and her family were able to escape to Canada.

== Arrest ==
Rimsha Masih was arrested on August 16, 2012, for allegedly burning pages from the Quran. While carrying trash in a plastic bag in the neighborhood where she lived she was told by a Muslim boy (Hammad) to let him inspect the contents of her bag. The boy then took the bag to the imam of a local mosque, Hafiz Mohammed Khalid Chishti who accusing Masih of desecrating the Quran, gave police burned papers from the trash as evidence against her. On August 24 Chishti told AFP news service that he thought Rimsha had burned the pages deliberately as part of a Christian "conspiracy" to insult Muslims, and that action should have been taken sooner to stop what he called their "anti-Islam activities" in the area. Outrage by local Muslims forced 300 local Christian families to leave their homes and to attempt to "find shelter in one of the Islamabad forests".

== Health condition ==
There are conflicting reports as to whether she has a mental health condition, with some sources claiming that she has Down syndrome, her family has been reported to have told her lawyer she suffers from mental illness. In the initial days after her arrest, human-rights workers "pinned their hopes" on Rimsha's mental condition, and her case being dismissed for her being mentally disabled. There are also conflicting reports about her age: although most sources describe her as 11 years old, she has also been claimed to be aged 14 or 16. Following a medical examination, a medical report estimated her age as being 14, and therefore a minor under Pakistani law, and stated that she had mental capacity lower than would be expected for someone of that age. This report was questioned by her accuser's lawyer, who accused the report of "favouring" her, and a prosecutor claimed that Rimsha is actually 21 years old. Some reports state that she is illiterate, and may have unknowingly picked the pages of the book up from a waste dump.

== Domestic and international reaction ==
Her arrest caused widespread condemnation, and was followed by a rise of inter-communal tension within Pakistan. The President of Pakistan, Asif Ali Zardari, has ordered an investigation into the arrest.

France "urged the Pakistani authorities to release this young girl" and has reaffirmed that "the very existence of the crime of blasphemy infringes upon fundamental freedoms, namely the freedom of religion or belief, as well as the freedom of expression. It urges Pakistan to comply with its international commitments in this area, notably the International Covenant on Civil and Political Rights as well as the Convention on the Rights of the Child."

Members of the All Pakistan Ulema Council joined with the Pakistan Interfaith League in protest against the accusations. Her father made a personal appeal to President Zardari on her behalf. The lawyer representing her accuser claimed the government was interfering on her behalf and claimed, "If the court is not allowed to do its work, because the state is helping the accused, then the public has no other option except to take the law into their own hands.".

The civic organization Avaaz launched a campaign to release Rimsha. As of September 2012, the campaign petition had gathered over one million signatures.

== New evidence and release on bail ==
On September 2, it was reported that a local imam, Hafiz Mohammed Khalid Chishti, had been arrested for desecrating the Quran himself and tampering with evidence. Police suspected him of planting pages of religious texts in Rimsha's bag.

The next day, the chairman of the All Pakistan Ulema Council, Hafiz Mohammad Tahir Mehmood Ashrafi made a statement supporting her, describing her as a "daughter of the nation".

On September 7, Rimsha Masih was released on bail, on a surety of 1,000,000 Pakistani rupees (US$10,570 on that date). Paul Bhatti, the Pakistani Minister for National Harmony, who had earlier stated his hopes that the case might help end the widespread abuse of the blasphemy laws, expressed "joy and satisfaction" at the development. After her release from jail, she was airlifted to an undisclosed location to rejoin her family.

According to Agence France Presse quoting investigators, Chishti was arrested after Chishti's deputy Maulvi Zubair and two others told a magistrate that Chishti had added pages from the Quran to the burnt pages brought to him by a witness. Zubair and the two others, Mohammad Shahzad and Awais Ahmed, said they had urged Chishti not to interfere with the papers but he told them it was the only way to expel the Christians from the area.

== Acquittal and emigration ==
On November 20, 2012, Rimsha was cleared of all charges by the Islamabad High Court.

In June 2013, CBC News reported her and her family to be living at an undisclosed location in Canada, where they were given permanent residency on "humanitarian and compassionate grounds". Despite the fact that the case against her was thrown out, people in Pakistan accused of blasphemy are often subject to vigilante justice.

According to the Canadian Immigration Minister Jason Kenney, a Pakistani contact asked him in January 2013 whether the family could come to Canada. "I said absolutely, if they could get her out. So a number of people did some very dangerous, delicate work to extricate her and her family from Pakistan, and we provided the necessary visas."

Aug 17, 2013 the lawyer of cleric Khalid Chishti reported that a district judge in Islamabad granted his motion to acquit Chishti, ruling that the prosecution had not brought forward sufficient evidence to convict the cleric.

== See also ==
- Acid throwing
- All Pakistan Ulema Council
- Asia Bibi blasphemy case
- Blue Veins (Pakistan)
- Christianity in Pakistan
- Islamic sexual jurisprudence
- Mera Jism Meri Marzi
- Sectarian violence in Pakistan
- Violence against women in Pakistan
