= 2017 Quetta church attack =

Terrorist attack against Christians in Quetta, Pakistan

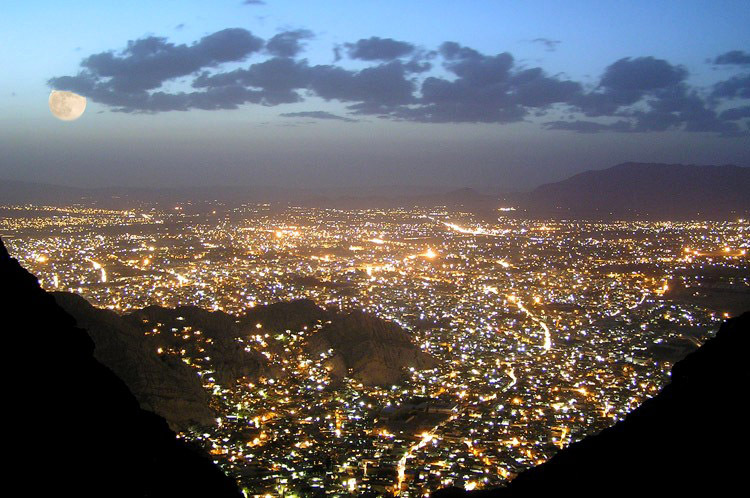
- City of Quetta
- Location: Quetta, Balochistan, Pakistan
- Date: 17 December 2017
- Target: Bethel Memorial Methodist Church; Pakistani Christians
- Deaths: 11 (including the 2 perpetrators)
- Injuries: 57
- Perpetrator: Islamic State of Iraq and the Levant

The 2017 Quetta church attack took place on 17 December 2017 when armed militants and suicide bombers stormed the Bethel Memorial Methodist Church in the western Pakistani city of Quetta, killing nine people and injuring dozens more. The attack was perpetrated by the Islamic State, who claimed responsibility through its Amaq media outlet.

== Background ==
Christians make up less than two percent of Pakistan's population and are among the poorest and least influential group of Pakistani society. The community is regularly targeted by violence from religious extremists, notably the Peshawar church bombing in 2013 which saw more than 100 people killed, or the Lahore church bombings in 2015 which killed nineteen. Quetta, located in the restive southwestern Pakistani province of Balochistan is a majority Sunni region that has been a hotbed for much violence in the country. In November 2017, a Pakistani paramilitary convoy in Quetta was attacked by a suicide bomber, killing four.

== Attack ==
On 17 December 2017, several hundred worshipers had gathered at the Bethel Memorial Methodist Church for Sunday service when a suicide bomber detonated his explosive vest at the entrance of the church hall. A second suicide bomber attempted to detonate his explosive vest however he was unable to and a gunfire broke out between him and security forces. The attacker was eventually killed, ending the assault which left nine people dead and scores more injured. Shortly after the attack, Amaq News Agency, the media arm of the Islamic State posted a statement online claiming the attack had been carried out by the group.

== See also ==
- 2019 Ghotki riots
- 2014 Larkana temple attack
- 2009 Gojra riots
- Quetta attacks
