= Arbab Jahandad Khan =

Pakistani politician

Member of the Khyber Pakhtunkhwa Assembly
- In office 13 August 2018 – 18 January 2023
- Succeeded by: Ijaz Muhammad
- Constituency: PK-68 (Peshawar-III)
- In office 31 May 2013 – 28 May 2018
- Constituency: PK-9 (Peshawar-IX)

Personal details
- Party: PTI (2013-present)
- Occupation: Politician

Arbab Jahandad Khan (Pashto: ارباب جھانداد خان) is a Pakistani politician hailing from Peshawar, who served as a member of the Provincial Assembly of Khyber Pakhtunkhwa from May 2013 to May 2018 and from August 2018 to January 2023, belonging to the Pakistan Tehreek-e-Insaf.

== Political career ==
Khan was elected as the member of the Khyber Pakhtunkhwa Assembly on ticket of Pakistan Tehreek-e-Insaf from PK-09 (Peshawar-IX) in the 2013 Pakistani general election.

He hurled a shoe at MPA-elect Baldev Kumar in Khyber Pakhtunkhwa Assembly on 27 February 2018.
