= Tahir Mehmood Ashrafi =

Pakistani Islamic scholar and religious leader

Hāfiẓ Mawlānā Tahir Mehmood Ashrafi
- طاہر محمود اشرفی

Chairman of Pakistan Ulema Council
- In office 1990
- Preceded by: None (office created)

Special Representative on Religious Harmony and the Middle East
- In office 2020–2022
- Succeeded by: None (office vacant)

Khateeb in Grand Jamia Mosque, Lahore
- Incumbent
- Assumed office 2014
- Preceded by: None (office created)

Member of Supreme Council of Muslim World League

Personal life
- Citizenship: Pakistani
- Education: University of the Punjab
- Occupation: Islamic scholar, cleric

Religious life
- Religion: Islam
- Denomination: Sunni Islam
- Jurisprudence: Hanafi
- Movement: Deobandi

Muslim leader
- Awards: President Award for Peace and Human Rights; OIC Award for Peace & Harmony,

Tahir Mehmood Ashrafi (Urdu: طاہر محمود اشرفی) is a Pakistani Islamic scholar and religious leader. He is chairman of the Pakistan Ulema Council and has held government posts dealing with religious affairs and relations with Muslim countries.

In January 2026, Prime Minister Shehbaz Sharif chose Ashrafi to serve as Coordinator for Religious Harmony and the Pakistani Diaspora in the Middle East and Muslim countries. The role includes work with Muslim and Arab countries and with Pakistanis living abroad.

== Career ==
Ashrafi was chairman of the Pakistan Ulema Council. He was a member of the Council of Islamic Ideology from 2012 to 2015. He also advised the Punjab government on religious and sectarian matters from 2000 to 2007.

In September 2020, Imran Khan, then Prime Minister of Pakistan, named Ashrafi as his Special Representative on Religious Harmony. Ashrafi spoke against religious extremism and sectarian violence. He also backed the building of a Hindu temple in Islamabad.

In February 2017, he met King Salman and Mohammed bin Salman in Saudi Arabia to discuss relations between Pakistan and Saudi Arabia.

== Rimsha Masih case ==
In 2012, Ashrafi spoke in support of Rimsha Masih, a Christian girl who had been accused of blasphemy in Pakistan. He called for an investigation into her arrest and said that people who made false claims should be punished.

Ashrafi said that he would help protect Masih if she was released. He also criticised the imam who had accused Masih of blasphemy, but did not call for Pakistan's blasphemy law to be repealed; he said that the issue was the implementation of the law.

== Controversies ==
=== Comments about Osama bin Laden ===
In 2007, during protests against the British decision to give author Salman Rushdie a knighthood, Ashrafi made comments in support of Osama bin Laden. He said that bin Laden had fought for Islam against Russia, the United States and Britain. He also said that he would give bin Laden the title Saifullah, meaning "Sword of God".

Ashrafi later said that his words had been taken out of context. In 2026, he told the BBC that he had been speaking about the anger of Muslims over Rushdie's knighthood.

=== Comments about suicide attacks ===
In 2013, it was reported that Ashrafi had described suicide attacks in Afghanistan, Palestine and Kashmir as allowed under Islam. He also said that armed resistance against American forces in Afghanistan was allowed under Islam. Ashrafi denied supporting attacks that killed civilians and said that he had been quoted out of context.

=== Television appearance ===
In 2014, Ashrafi appeared on a Pakistani television programme and appeared to slur his words. Some viewers said that he appeared drunk. Ashrafi denied this, saying was taking medicine and chewing betel nut, which affected his speech, and said that the accusations were part of a campaign against him from prime minister Imran Khan and cleric Muhammad Tahir-ul-Qadri.

=== Hubert Walter Award ===
In September 2026, Ashrafi received the Hubert Walter Award for Reconciliation and Interfaith Cooperation from Sarah Mullally, the Archbishop of Canterbury, at Lambeth Palace. The award recognised his work with religious minorities in Pakistan, especially Christians.

The award was given on 11 September 2026, the 25th anniversary of the September 11 attacks. Soon afterwards, Ashrafi's 2007 comments about bin Laden were brought back to public attention. The UK's shadow culture secretary Rebecca Paul and Nick Timothy, the shadow justice secretary, and Kemi Badenoch, the leader of the opposition, also criticised a photograph of the event wherein Ashrafi's wife was wearing the niqab. Paul and Timothy argued it "could appear to condone one of the most repressive manifestations of Islam", citing mandatory veiling laws in Afghanistan and Iran and social pressure on Muslim girls in the UK to veil themselves. On 17 September, the Archbishop of Canterbury's office said that it had withdrawn the award.

Ashrafi said that the criticism of his 2007 comments was unfair and that his words had been taken out of context. He said that criticism of his wife's wearing of the niqab caused them both distress and emphasised that it was his wife and daughter's choice to wear the niqab. The Pakistan Ulema Council also pointed to his later work against terrorism and in support of religious minorities. He also stated that Mullaly, the first female Archbishop of Canterbury, was being criticised by conservative opponents within the Church of England for political reasons. The Moderator of the Church of Pakistan, Azad Marshall, criticised the Church of England's handling of the affair and said that Ashrafi was owed an apology, citing Ashrafi's condemnation of the Jaranwala church arsons in 2023.

== Books ==
Ashrafi has been credited as the author of several books, including:

- Khutbat-e-Akabir (خطبات اکابر)
- Rwadari Sirat-e-Tayyaba ki Roshni me (رواداری سیرت طیبہ کی روشنی میں)
- Muslim Hukmran Or Ghair Muslim Raia (مسلم حکمران اور غیر مسلم رعایا)
- Hazrat Ghulam Ghaus Hazarvi (حضرت غلام غوث ہزارویؒ)
- FATWA Jehad Or Deshat Gardi Kiya Hai (فتویٰ جہاد اور دہشت گردی کیا ہے)
- FATWA – Polio Vaccine Hilal Hai (فتویٰ پولیو ویکسین حلال ہے)
- Islam or Asar-e-Hazir K Masail (اسلام اور عصر حاضر کے مسائل)
- Mushtarka Fatwa (مشترکہ فتویٰ)
