= 2021 Bhong temple attack =

Ganesh Temple, Bhong
- گنیش مندر، بھونگ

Religion
- Affiliation: Hinduism

Location
- Location: Bhong city, Punjab, Pakistan

Ganesh Temple, Bhong (Urdu: گنیش مندر، بھونگ) was a prominent Hindu temple located in Bhong city in the Rahim Yar Khan district in Punjab province of Pakistan. On 4 August 2021, it was attacked, vandalised, and partially set ablaze by a mob following communal tensions over a blasphemy allegation involving a Hindu minor.

== Incident ==
In late July 2021, an eight-year-old Hindu boy was accused of urinating in the library of a local madrassa, an act considered blasphemous by the Muslim community. The boy was arrested on 26 July and granted bail on 28 July. On 4 August, hundreds of protesters gathered outside the Ganesh temple in Bhong and stormed the building. Armed with sticks and stones, they vandalised Hindu idols, damaged interior structures, and partially set the temple on fire while chanting slogans. Videos of the attack circulated on social media, drawing widespread outrage.

Local police were slow to respond, prompting authorities to deploy paramilitary rangers to restore order and prevent further escalation.

== Response ==
The Supreme Court of Pakistan took suo motu notice of the incident on 6 August. Chief Justice Gulzar Ahmed criticised the inaction of local police and ordered the immediate arrest of those involved, along with the full restoration of the temple at government expense. The Chief Justice stated that the failure to protect religious minorities was damaging Pakistan’s international image.

By 7 August, at least 20 individuals had been arrested, and more than 150 were booked on charges including terrorism, rioting, and destruction of property. Police used video footage from the scene to identify suspects. Over time, the number of arrests rose to nearly 90.

The Punjab government initiated reconstruction work promptly, bringing in artisans from Sindh to restore damaged idols. By 10 August 2021, the temple was fully repaired and ceremonially handed back to the Hindu community.

In May 2022, an anti-terrorism court in Bahawalpur convicted 22 individuals and sentenced them to five years in prison each. Another 62 people were acquitted due to insufficient evidence.

== Reactions ==
Prime Minister Imran Khan condemned the attack, calling it “shameful” and vowing strict action against those responsible. The Ministry of Human Rights called it “against the teachings of Islam and the Constitution of Pakistan.”

Religious leaders, parliamentarians, and civil society organisations strongly denounced the assault. Pakistan’s National Assembly passed a unanimous resolution condemning the violence and affirming the rights of minorities to worship freely.

The Pakistan Hindu Council urged stronger protection for religious sites and called the incident "a clear failure of law enforcement." Indian authorities also lodged a diplomatic protest demanding better safeguards for Pakistan's Hindu community.

=== International ===
India reacted strongly, summoning the Pakistani Charge d’Affaires in New Delhi on 5 August 2021. The Indian Ministry of External Affairs issued a formal demarche, expressing grave concern over the security of Pakistan’s Hindu minority and urging Islamabad to ensure the protection of religious sites. The United States Commission on International Religious Freedom (USCIRF) condemned the incident, stating it was part of a “troubling pattern of attacks on religious minorities in Pakistan.” USCIRF urged the Pakistani government to hold perpetrators accountable and to protect places of worship for all communities. International human rights groups such as Amnesty International and Human Rights Watch also expressed alarm. Amnesty International called the attack a “shocking and cowardly act of violence,” and demanded immediate justice and long-term safeguards for minority communities in Pakistan. Canada’s Office of Religious Freedom highlighted growing intolerance and urged Pakistani authorities to uphold constitutional protections for minorities. The British High Commission in Islamabad issued a statement on social media condemning the violence and affirming the importance of religious freedom.

== See also ==
- 2019 Ghotki riots, series of attacks also targeting Hindu temples in Pakistan
- 2020 Karak temple attack, another attack on a Hindu temple in Pakistan
- Blasphemy in Pakistan
- Hinduism in Pakistan
- Religious discrimination in Pakistan
