= All Pakistan Minorities Alliance =

All Pakistan Minorities Alliance آل پاکستان اقلیتی اتحاد
- Abbreviation: APMA
- Leader: Paul Bhatti
- Founder: Shahbaz Bhatti

The All Pakistan Minorities Alliance is a group that opposes violence and discrimination against religious minorities in Pakistan. Shahbaz Bhatti, an outspoken critic of Pakistan's blasphemy laws founded the group, to advocate for government protection of Christians, as well as other minority groups like Hindus, Sufis and Ahmadis. Paul Bhatti is the current leader.

Shahbaz Bhatti was appointed as Federal Minister for Minorities Affairs on 2 November 2008, when, for the first time, the post was elevated to cabinet level and an independent ministry created. At the time, he said that he accepted the post for the sake of the "oppressed, down-trodden and marginalized" of Pakistan, and that he had dedicated his life to the "struggle for human equality, social justice, religious freedom, and to uplift and empower religious minorities' communities." He added that he wanted to send "a message of hope to the people living a life of disappointment, disillusionment and despair", and also stated his commitment to reforming the country's blasphemy laws.

During his time as federal minister, he took numerous steps in support of religious minorities. These included the launch of a national campaign to promote interfaith harmony, the proposal of legislation to ban hate speech and related literature, the proposed introduction of comparative religion as a curriculum subject, the introduction of quotas for religious minorities in government posts and the reservation of four Senate seats for minorities. Bhatti also spearheaded the organisation of a National Interfaith Consultation in July 2010, which brought together senior religious leaders of all faiths from across Pakistan and resulted in a joint declaration against terrorism.

== See also ==
- Pakistan Interfaith League
- Religious discrimination in Pakistan
- Sectarianism in Pakistan
