= Jaranwala church arsons =

2023 attacks on Christians in Pakistan

- Part of Violence against Christians in Pakistan
- Date: 16 August 2023
- Location: Jaranwala, Punjab, Pakistan

Parties
Muslim mobs	Punjab Police

Casualties
- Deaths: None
- Damage: 26 churches set on fire

The Jaranwala church arsons was the burning and destruction of 26 Christian churches in Jaranwala, Punjab, Pakistan, by supporters of the Tehreek-e-Labbaik Pakistan (TLP) through acts of arson on 16 August 2023.

The attacks were carried out by a far-right TLP mob who were enraged by false allegations that a Christian man had desecrated the Quran. As a result, the TLP rioters burned churches, looted homes belonging to Christian families, and also committed Bible desecration. Although the TLP officially distanced itself from the event, more than a hundred rioters affiliated with the TLP were arrested.

== Background ==
In recent years, there have been a number of high-profile attacks on Christians in Pakistan. There have been a number of high-profile cases of Christians being accused of blasphemy. In 2013, a suicide bombing at a church in Peshawar killed 82 people. In 2015, a mob attacked a Christian couple in Punjab, burning them alive. In 2014, a Christian couple was burned alive in a brick kiln after being accused of desecrating the Quran. In 2018, a Christian woman, Asia Bibi, was sentenced to death for blasphemy.

== Events ==
On 16 August 2023, reports of alleged Quran desecration by two Christian men began circulating on social media. Torn pages of the Quran were allegedly found near the Christian quarter of the city. These were brought to a local Muslim religious leader, who urged local Muslims to protest and demand the culprits be brought to justice. This incited a riot where hundreds of Muslim men armed with sticks and rocks attacked a Christian community in Jaranwala, Punjab, Pakistan. The attack was triggered by an accusation that a local Christian family in the area had desecrated the Quran. The alleged desecration of the Quran was shared among the locals, creating an uproar in the Muslim community. Videos had also appeared on social media sites showing local Muslim leaders using mosque loudspeakers encouraging Muslims to demonstrate against the Christians. The rioters went on to attack at least 17 Christian churches within the city, as well as Christian homes and a Christian cemetery. The attacked churches, which were either vandalized or set on fire, represented a variety of Christian denominations, including the Presbyterian church, the Salvation Army church, and the Roman Catholic church. Christian residents reported that their homes were vandalized and looted, with some rioters burning their household items and furniture. The rioters were recorded toppling a Christian cross off of a church steeple. In another video "four other [Christian] churches are attacked, their windows broken as attackers threw pieces of furniture outside and set them on fire". Bible desecration was also reported. Some local mosques used their loudspeakers to further incite the violence. No deaths were reported.

Some rioters also attacked the offices of a city administrator but were deterred by police and Muslim clerics.

Christian residents fled as the events unfolded, moving to the eastern part of Jaranwala, nearby villages, and to the city of Faisalabad. Some Christians were sheltered by their Muslim neighbors, who also attempted to stop the violence by pinning Quranic verses to the doors of Christian houses. Some residents began to return to their homes on 17 August, while others continued to evacuate to stay with family outside the city.

The Pakistani government condemned the attacks and dispatched police and Paramilitary Rangers to restore order to the affected areas. 129 Muslims were arrested by the police after the incident. Two Christians that allegedly tore pages from the Quran and wrote insulting remarks on other pages were also arrested.

== Aftermath ==
The two Christian men cited in the original social media posts were arrested by the Punjab Police of Pakistan for alleged Quran desecration, a violation of the country's blasphemy law.

Rizwan Khan, the regional police chief, said that 129 people in connection with the mob violence had been arrested. These included members of the far-right group Tehreek-e-Labbaik Pakistan. Government officials also promised to provide financial compensation for residents whose homes had been attacked, as well as assistance in rebuilding.

Demonstrations condemning the violence and Pakistan's blasphemy laws took place in Karachi and Lahore on 17 August.

Catholic charity Aid to the Church in Need helped address the emergency needs of those whose livelihoods were destroyed, providing a support package for 464 families, including replacement rickshaws and motorcycles for drivers who had lost their vehicles.

== Reactions ==
Pakistan's Interim Prime Minister, Anwar ul-Haq Kakar, criticized the rioters and called on them to stop the violence, posting on Twitter: “Stern action would be taken against those who violate the law and target minorities.”

US State Department Principal Deputy Spokesperson Vedant Patel called for a full investigation into the events, stating that "we support peaceful freedom of expression and the right to freedom of religion and belief for everybody".

Patricia Gossman, associate Asia director at Human Rights Watch reacted: “The Faisalabad attack underscores the failings of Pakistan’s police to adequately protect religious minority communities and respond promptly to violence targeting them. The lack of prosecutions of those responsible for such crimes in the past emboldens those who commit violence in the name of religion.”

Organizations that condemn the attack included Amnesty International and Minorities Alliance Pakistan. International Christian Concern, a Christian human rights NGO, said that it was "deeply saddened" by the events and "called on the international community to pressure Pakistan to repeal its blasphemy laws", which they stated "are often misused to settle personal scores or target religious minorities".

Archbishop Joseph Arshad of the Roman Catholic Bishops' Conference of Pakistan stated: "Our places of worship and people are not safe in any way due to this. We demand a transparent investigation into this regrettable incident for the supremacy of law and justice so that a better society is established where religion and harmony are respected." United Protestant bishop Azad Marshall of the Church of Pakistan, also took to social media to demand action by authorities.

== Justice ==
In February, 2024, a Catholic bishop praised the fact that the Pakistani Supreme Court had rejected a Government report into the incident. Qazi Faez Isa, the Chief Justice of Pakistan, who headed the three-member bench of the Supreme Court, described the report, submitted by the Additional Advocate General of Punjab, as being worthy of “being thrown in the dustbin”. The court alleged the report lacked relevant information, including details of arrests and court cases and that the investigation agencies lacked determination to bring the perpetrators to justice. Catholic Bishop Samson Shukardin lauded the Supreme Court's reaction as the first time the justice system had taken Christian persecution so seriously.

Less than two months later, however, another Catholic Bishop lamented the fact that nobody had yet been charged in the case of the attacks, and that those who had been arrested were gradually being released. Bishop Indrias Rehmat of Faisalabad said: “More than 300 people were arrested [following the atrocity] but it is unlikely that they will face justice. Slowly, they have started releasing them. Nobody has been charged.” He was also critical of Government sponsored repairs, which he said were shoddy and had left the torched churches unsafe to enter.

On the first anniversary of the riots Bishop Indrias Rehmat of Faisalabad said: "People are frightened and feeling hopeless because so far justice has not been given to them", adding "they demand that we act for justice but what can we do? Justice can only be given by the government. The culprits are mostly out on bail and this is upsetting the community."

The bishop reaffirmed his protest on the second anniversary of the attacks, saying: "Justice has not been done. The police have not done their duty. Nobody has been punished and nobody has been dealt with properly. At this stage, we do not see any hope of any culprit being punished."

== See also ==
- 2019 Ghotki riots
- 2014 Larkana temple attack
- 2009 Gojra riots
