= Paul Bhatti =

Pakistani politician

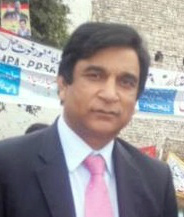
Dr. Paul Jacob Bhatti

Paul Jacob Bhatti is a Pakistani politician and surgeon. He is the former federal minister in charge of National Harmony and Minorities Affairs. He served as a minister in the government of then President of Pakistan Asif Ali Zardari.

== Early life ==
He obtained his basic degree of Doctor in Medicine, and Surgery (MD) from the University of Padua in Italy. He also attended the Université catholique de Louvain in Belgium. He received his post-graduation eq: FRCS from the University of Padua, and a Masters in Plastic and Cosmetic Surgery from the same university in 2008,

=== Medical career ===
He has been working as a surgeon in various hospitals of, Belgium, Netherlands, United Kingdom, France, Pakistan and currently Italy.

== Politics ==
Bhatti worked very closely with his late brother Shahbaz Bhatti to uplift the marginalized and oppressed sectors of the society. He is committed to promote religious freedom, human equality and social justice. He was the main advisor and financial supporter to Shahbaz Bhatti with his fight against injustices in Pakistan.

After the assassination of his brother Shahbaz Bhatti, he was offered a portfolio of Federal ministry of his brother and was elected Chairman of the All Pakistan Minorities Alliance, a movement founded by his late brother. He established the welfare organisations Shahbaz Bhatti Memorial Trust (SBMT) in Pakistan and Missione Shahbaz Bhatti (MSB) in Italy to continue the vision and the mission of his brother who was assassinated on 2 March 2012 by an extremist group in Islamabad, Pakistan. The SBMT was officially inaugurated by the President of Pakistan, Asif Ali Zardari.

"During his position of Minister he has visited several countries of the world where he was welcomed and appreciated for his courageous work by head of states, political and religious leaders, human social activist from Canada, US, UK, Germany, France, S.Korea, Spain, Hungary, Poland, Middle East and Asia. He held several seminars on Human Equality and religious persecution. In particularly he raised his voice in United Nations, EU Parliament, UK House of Commons to support innocent Victims of violence. He helped to build welfare institutions, hospitals, schools, training centers (for job opportunities). He always lauded religious freedom as a symbol of basic human right and dignity. He voiced a message of freedom and democracy in area where basic human rights are very frequently violated".

In the course of his struggle, he supported and saved several innocent victims of violence and specially got involved in the protection of (Rimsha Masih blasphemy case) a girl of 14 years. Rimsha was falsely accused of blasphemy by an imam of the area, who later was detained on 1 September 2012, for desecrating the Quran himself and tampering with evidence.

On 22 October 2013, Bhatti with Canadian High Commissioner to Pakistan Greg Giokas inaugurated a new solar-powered irrigation plant-irrigation in the village of Khushpur in Punjab.

On 2 July 2014, Bhatti participated as Keynote Speaker at the event organised on the occasion of The United Nations International Day in Support of Victims of Torture and Other Cruel, Inhuman or Degrading Treatment or Punishment and To mark the beginning of the Italian Presidency of the European Union.
