= Baldev Kumar =

Pakistani politician

Baldev Kumar is a former Pakistani politician who served as a member of the Provincial Assembly of Khyber Pakhtunkhwa on a reserved seat for minorities representing the Pakistan Tehreek-e-Insaf (PTI) from 2013. He was arrested in 2016 in connection with the murder of PTI leader Soran Singh and was acquitted by an anti-terrorism court in April 2018, though the acquittal was later challenged in the Peshawar High Court (PHC). In September 2019, he travelled to India and sought political asylum while the plaintiffs claimed that the case was still pending in the PHC.

== Political career ==
In 2013, Baldev was elected as a member of the Provincial Assembly of Khyber Pakhtunkhwa on a reserved seat for minorities representing the Pakistan Tehreek-e-Insaf (PTI).

== Murder case ==
In 2016, following the assassination of Soran Singh, Baldev was accused of involvement in the murder and arrested. He remained in custody for two years before being acquitted in April 2018 by an anti-terrorism court for lack of evidence. According to the victim's family, the acquittal was challenged in the Peshawar High Court in June 2018.

== Departure from Pakistan ==
In September 2019, Baldev travelled to India and sought political asylum, stating at a press conference in Khanna, Ludhiana that Pakistan was an "unsafe country" and that "minorities are not safe in Pakistan." His brother countered his claims, stating there was no threat to minorities and expressing suspicion that Baldev may have been coerced into issuing the statement. Meanwhile, the son of slain PTI minority lawmaker, alleged that Baldev had fled to India to avoid conviction for his father's murder in a case pending before the Peshawar High Court.
