= Ijaz Muhammad =

Pakistani politician

Member of the Provincial Assembly of Khyber Pakhtunkhwa
- Incumbent
- Assumed office 29 February 2024
- Preceded by: Arbab Jahandad Khan
- Constituency: PK-74 Peshawar-III

Personal details
- Born: Peshawar District, Khyber Pakhtunkhwa, Pakistan
- Political party: JUI (F) (2024-present)

Ijaz Muhammad is a Pakistani politician from Peshawar District. He is currently serving as member of the Provincial Assembly of Khyber Pakhtunkhwa since February 2024.

== Career ==
He contested the 2024 general elections as a Jamiat Ulema-e-Islam (F) candidate from PK-74 Peshawar-III. He secured 45959 votes while the runner-up was Arbab Jahandad Khan of Pakistan Tehreek-e-Insaf/Independent who secured 21817 votes.
