= Pakistan Interfaith League =

The Pakistan Interfaith League is an interfaith organization in Pakistan.

== Leadership ==
Sajid Ishaq Sandhu serves as the Founder Chairman of the Pakistan Interfaith League. He joined the political party Pakistan Tehreek-e-Insaf in May 2012. He had been absent from the party since he was involved in a sex scandal and was denied a ticket for the National Assembly in the 2013 Pakistani general election by party chairman Imran Khan and removed as president of the party's minority wing. He quit in April 2018.

== Protection of minority rights ==
In April 2016, at a gathering of Muslim and Christian religious leaders to pay tributes to Soran Singh, who was a member of the Provincial Assembly of Khyber Pakhtunkhwa, Hafiz Tahir Ashrafi of All Pakistan Ulema Council highlighted Soran Singh's efforts for interfaith harmony in Pakistan.

Pakistan Interfaith League's chairman, Sajid Ishaq said that non-Muslims living in Pakistan do not need to be afraid of anyone as Pakistan also belongs to non-Muslims. Another speaker at the event said that Pakistan was created with coordinated support of people of all different religions.

Bishop Mazhar Ishaq stated that it was a sign of hope for non-Muslims living in Pakistan to see people from different religions gathered at this event.

== See also ==
- All Pakistan Minorities Alliance
- Religious discrimination in Pakistan
