= All Pakistan Ulema Council =

Pakistani religious organization

The Pakistan Ulema Council پاکستان علماء کونسل
- Chairperson: Tahir Mehmood Ashrafi
- Founded: 1990
- Religion: Islam

The Pakistan Ulema Council (PUC) (Note: Urdu: پاکستان علماء کونسل, lit. 'Council of Islamic Scholars Pakistan') is an Islamic umbrella group in Pakistan whose members include Islamic scholars and legal scholars from a range of Islamic traditions. The group is led by Tahir Mehmood Ashrafi.

Established in 1990, the fundamental reason for its establishment was to put an end to the growing Sectarian violence in Pakistan, and to spread Islam's true message of peace, love, forbearance, harmony and services to mankind throughout the world.

== Views ==
=== Protection of minorities in Pakistan ===
Pakistan Ulema Council joined hands with the Pakistan Interfaith League, which includes Christians, Sikhs and other religions called for justice for the Christian girl who is accused of blasphemy. In views, If a woman is thought to have brought shame to her family, male family members may feel pressure to take strict steps to protect the family's honour. Worries about marriage proposals and dowry can also affect how honor is seen. Society often expects families to follow traditional values, and sometimes supports harsh actions. However, giving women access to education and jobs is helping to challenge these old ways of thinking. People at the event asked for a fair investigation and also said that anyone making false accusations should be punished.

In 2020, the Pakistan Ulema Council also supported the construction of Hindu temple in Islamabad stating that "To have their own place of worship and offer a life as per their faith and tradition are the right given to all non-Muslims in the Constitution and as well as in Sharia".

=== Fatwa denouncing honor killings ===
The council issued a fatwa (religious edict) denouncing and prohibiting honor killings in Pakistan and said that honor killings are "un-Islamic" and "inhuman". The Islamic clergy elaborated that "[A] daughter is a gift by Allah" and that "Daughter is a gift not a problem". One woman protester held up a sign saying, "There is no honor in killing."

The Council further stated that it was the responsibility of the Pakistani government and the court system to punish those guilty of this crime with the harshest possible sentences.

=== Fatwa denouncing the kafir declaration ===
The council issued a fatwa which said that declaring other Islamic sects such as Shia as kafir (non-believers) was against Islam. The fatwa was announced to promote inter-sectarian tolerance by acknowledging that there was diversity in the way in which Islam is practiced by different sects such as Sunni, Shia and different expressions of religion such as Sufism which was targeted by extremists. The use of loudspeakers except for the adhan (call to prayer) and the Friday sermon was also banned.

All Pakistan Ulema Council also decided that printing and distribution of material promoting hatred and violence would be banned from social networking websites and the internet. At this conference, Sardar Muhammad Yousuf, Minister for Religious Affairs and Interfaith Harmony stated that the Constitution of Pakistan protects the minorities, gives equal rights to all Pakistani citizens regardless of their religion.

=== Denouncing ISIL activities ===
The council denounced the activities of Islamic State of Iraq and the Levant (known as ISIS or Daesh), in a statement the council said, "Islam and Muslims cannot support the killing of innocent people and destruction of their properties at the hands of ISIS", it asked "people and youth in Islamic countries to not cooperate with any violent group whose teachings or actions are against the teachings of Islam and Mohammad."
