= PK-74 Peshawar-III =

Pakistani electoral district

- Constituency for the Khyber Pakhtunkhwa Assembly
- Region: Chamkani Tehsil (partly) and Shah Alam Tehsil (partly) of Peshawar District

Current constituency
- Party: Jamiat Ulema-e-Islam (F)
- Member(s): Ijaz Muhammad
- Created from: PK-09 Peshawar-IX (2002-2018); PK-68 Peshawar-III (2018-2023)

PK-74 Peshawar-III (پی کے-74 پشاور-3) is a constituency for the Khyber Pakhtunkhwa Assembly of the Khyber Pakhtunkhwa province of Pakistan.

== See also ==
- PK-73 Peshawar-II
- PK-75 Peshawar-IV
