= 2009 Gojra riots =

Series of attacks targeting Christians in Pakistan

- Location: Gojra, Punjab, Pakistan
- Date: August 1, 2009
- Attack type: Mob attack
- Deaths: 8
- Injuries: 18

The 2009 Gojra riots were a series of attacks targeting Christians in Gojra town in Punjab province of Pakistan. These resulted in the deaths of eight Christians including a child.

== Background ==
Gojra, located in the Toba Tek Singh District of Pakistan's Punjab province, has a relatively high number of Christians. The attacks were triggered by reports of desecration of the Qur'an. It was reported that Mukhtar Maseeh, Talib Maseeh and his son Imran Maseeh had desecrated the papers inscribed with Qur'an verses at a wedding ceremony. District Police Officer Inkisar Khan said a case had been registered under section 295-B of the Pakistan Penal Code against Mukhtar Maseeh, Talib Maseeh and Imran Maseeh without any arrest. Forty houses and a Church were set ablaze by a mob on August 1, 2009. Most of the houses were burnt by youths who had their faces covered with veils. The victims were all burnt alive. 18 others were injured. Televised footage showed burning houses and streets strewn with blackened furniture and people firing at each other from their rooftops. The dead were identified as Hameed Maseeh, 50, Asia Bibi, 20, Asifa Bibi, 19, Imamia Bibi, 22, Musa, 7, Akhlas Maseeh, 40, and Parveen, 50. According to Rafiq Masih, a resident of the predominantly Christian colony “They were shouting anti-Christian slogans and attacked our houses.” Residents said that police stood aside while the mob went on the rampage. “We kept begging for protection, but police did not take action,” Masih said. According to Pakistan government, they had received information that a group of armed ‘miscreants’, with masked faces had come from Jhang.

Pakistani minorities also face intimidation at the hands of discriminatory laws, including a blasphemy law that carries the death penalty for using derogatory language against Islam, the Qur'an and Muhammad. The law is often misused to settle personal scores and rivalries. These attacks came less than a month after a mob attacked 100 houses belonging to Christians in Kasur District of Pakistan, destroying many of them and injuring many people after a blasphemy charge. According to Nadeem Anthony, a member of the Human Rights Commission of Pakistan, there was a link between violence against Christians and the US-led war in Afghanistan. Joseph Francis of the Christian Nationalist Part stated that the Muslim mob in Gojra had been incited with hate-speech that called Christians "America's dogs", he added since "9/11, we've felt a lot more at risk.

== Aftermath ==
Law minister Rana Sanaullah, who was also responsible for security matters of Punjab at that time, condemned the attack and ordered an inquiry. A contingent of Pakistan Rangers was sent to the city on orders of federal government. He stated that a preliminary investigation showed there was no desecration of the Qur'an. "It was just a rumor which was exploited by anti-state elements to create chaos," he said. President Asif Ali Zardari expressed grave concern over the incidents and directed federal minister for minority affairs Shahbaz Bhatti to remain in Gojra until the situation becomes normal and also asked him to take steps for the security of people's life and property. Police lodged cases against 17 known and 783 unknown suspects following these attacks. Chief Minister of Punjab, Shahbaz Sharif announced US$ 6,000 for each bereaved family. According to Shahbaz Bhatti, the federal minister for minorities, the attackers belonged to Sipah-e-Sahaba Pakistan, a banned militant group which has carried out attacks against security forces and bombings in recent years. This group was originally an anti-Shiite organization and was funded in the past by Pakistan's intelligence services to wage war in Kashmir. Police arrested more than 65 people for their alleged involvement in the violence under anti-terrorism laws. The arrested men include Qari Abdul Khaliq Kashmiri, a leader of the banned Sipah-e-Sahaba Pakistan.

Following the riots relatives of the slain protested by blocking the Multan-Faisalabad railway line for six hours, which passes through Gojra, by placing coffins of those killed on the tracks. On Sunday representatives of the protesters met with government ministers in talks to end the protests.

The blockade of the railway only ended when provincial minister Kamran Michael showed the protesters a copy of a First Information Report (FIR) apportioning blame onto the District Coordination Officer and the Divisional Police Officer (DPO) for negligence.

Kamran Michael, the provincial Minister for Minority Affairs, who himself is Christian, said that there "is too much fear among the Christians", he added that "the situation is tense in the city, but security has been enhanced to keep the situation under control." Christian schools closed for three days to mourn the victims of these attacks. Christians in Gojra will mark August 11, traditionally celebrated as Pakistan's minority day, as a "black day" of mourning.

According to Iqbal Haider, co-chairperson of the Human Rights Commission of Pakistan, the attacks are an indication of the unchecked growth of religious extremism in Pakistan. "This has to be a wake-up call for the government. The Gojra tragedy is just the latest, this is a direct consequence of the religious fanaticism that is rampant now all over Pakistan. These extremists are hell-bent upon killing every person who does not support their religious views," he said.

On August 4, Punjab CM Shahbaz Sharif visited the city and, speaking to the media from a church in the city, strongly condemned the acts of violence and promised that members of the Muslim League will stay in the area for rehabilitation.

== Reaction ==
=== Domestic ===
- Pakistan: On August 4, Punjab CM Shahbaz Sharif visited the city, speaking to the media from a church in the city he strongly condemned the acts of violence and promised that members of the Muslim League will stay in the area for rehabilitation. President Asif Ali Zardari took serious notice of the incident and was concerned about the wrong done to the victims of violence as well as the wrong signals it sent about the image of Pakistan and society to the international community.

Altaf Hussain of the Muttahida Qaumi Movement strongly condemned the attacks and called upon the government to quickly arrest the culprits.

Sherry Rehman of Pakistan Peoples Party calling for repeal of the blasphemy laws stated “Pakistan Peoples Party has always sought to protect the minorities, but it is General Zia’s black laws that are used to target innocent civilians on trumped-up ruses. Nobody should demonize what is sacred to another, and Islam is clear on this issue, but nobody must be allowed to exploit and misuse laws, such as the Blasphemy Law, which were ordered into law by a dictator, who politicized religion to make up for his own lack of legitimacy.”

=== International reaction ===
- Italy: Italian foreign minister Franco Frattini condemned the violence against Christians as "a very grave and unjustifiable attack against human rights and in particular against the inalienable right to religious freedom."
- Vatican City: Pope Benedict XVI deplored the riots describing it as a 'senseless attack' that he was 'deeply grieved' to hear about.

== See also ==
- Christianity in Pakistan
- Terrorism in Pakistan
- 2020 Karak temple attack
- 2019 Ghotki riots
- 2014 Larkana temple attack
