= Soran Singh =

Pakistani politician

Special Assistant on Minority Affairs Department of Khyber Pakhtunkhwa
- In office 3 September 2013 – 22 April 2016

Member of the Khyber Pakhtunkhwa Assembly
- In office May 2013 – 22 April 2016

Personal details
- Born: Soran Singh
- Died: 22 April 2016 Pir Baba, Buner District, Pakistan
- Profession: Doctor; TV anchor Politician

Soran Singh (died 22 April 2016) was a Pakistani Sikh doctor, TV anchor, politician and Minister of Minorities of Khyber Pakhtunkhwa. Before joining Pakistan Tehreek-e-Insaf in 2011, he was a member of Jamaat-e-Islami Pakistan for nine years. He was also member of Tehsil council, Pakistan Sikh Gurdwara Prabandhak Committee and Evacuee Trust Property Board. He also hosted the programme Za Hum Pakistani Yam for three and a half years with Khyber News.

== Assassination ==
He was gunned down in a targeted attack near his house on Friday, 22 April 2016. Khyber Pakhtunkhwa Police later arrested Baldev Kumar, who allegedly orchestrated Singh's murder due to political rivalry, and hired paid assassins for the purpose. Kumar wanted to contest elections from the same party on a reserved minority seat. He developed differences with Singh when the latter was picked for the seat. Kumar was acquitted by an anti-terrorism court in 2018 for lack of "solid evidence." Expressing his disquiet with the verdict, Soran's son Ajay Singh at the time had said: "We are dissatisfied with the verdict but due to lacking resources, it is impossible for us to challenge it in the superior courts." According to Ajay, the accused had also made confessional statements before the police and courts regarding the murder. Kumar alleged that he was wrongly accused because of his religion.
