= Shahbaz Bhatti =

Pakistani politician (1968–2011)

Servant of God Shahbaz Bhatti
- شہباز بھٹی

Federal Minister for Minorities Affairs
- In office 2 November 2008 – 2 March 2011
- President: Asif Ali Zardari
- Prime Minister: Yousaf Raza Gillani
- Preceded by: Muhammad Ijaz-ul-Haq
- Succeeded by: Paul Bhatti

Personal details
- Born: 9 September 1968 Lahore, Pakistan
- Died: 2 March 2011 (aged 42) Islamabad, Pakistan
- Party: Pakistan Peoples Party (PPP)
- Education: University of the Punjab

Clement Shahbaz Bhatti (9 September 1968 – 2 March 2011) was a Pakistani politician and the first Christian Federal Minister for Minorities Affairs. He was elected as a member of the National Assembly in 2008 for the Pakistan People's Party. Bhatti became the only Christian member of Prime Minister Yusuf Raza Gilani's Cabinet on 2 November. On 2 March 2011, Bhatti was assassinated outside his mother's home by members of the Pakistani Taliban for his opposition to Pakistan's blasphemy laws. In March 2016, his cause for beatification was formally opened by the Diocese of Islamabad-Rawalpindi. He was given the honorary title Servant of God within the Catholic Church.

== Early life ==
Bhatti was born in Lahore to Christian parents from the Faisalabad District. His father, Jacob Bhatti, worked as an officer of the British Army, then as a teacher, before becoming chairman of the board of churches in Khushpur. On 10 December 1995, Human Rights Day, Bhatti married Salma Peter John, a human rights activist. However, after Bhatti’s death, his family has denied that this wedding ever took place and insists that Salma was only Bhatti's employee. In March 2013, she sought asylum in the United States following repeated intimidation and death threats from Bhatti's family.

== Career ==
Bhatti founded the Christian Liberation Front in 1985, while studying public administration at the University of the Punjab in Lahore. He founded the All Pakistan Minorities Alliance (APMA) in 2002 and was unanimously elected as its chairman. He met with President Pervez Musharraf as part of a group of minority rights advocates. Bhatti joined the Pakistan Peoples Party (PPP) in 2002, but remained outside politics until becoming a minister in 2008. He was placed on the government's Exit Control List in 2003, but was removed in November of that year.

Bhatti was appointed as Federal Minister for Minorities Affairs on 2 November 2008, when, for the first time, the post was elevated to cabinet level and an independent ministry created. At the time, he said that he accepted the post for the sake of the "oppressed, down-trodden and marginalized" of Pakistan, and that he had dedicated his life to the "struggle for human equality, social justice, religious freedom, and to uplift and empower religious minorities' communities." He added that he wanted to send "a message of hope to the people living a life of disappointment, disillusionment and despair", and also stated his commitment to reforming the country's blasphemy laws.

During his time as federal minister, he took numerous steps in support of religious minorities. These included the launch of a national campaign to promote interfaith harmony, the proposal of legislation to ban hate speech and related literature, the proposed introduction of comparative religion as a curriculum subject, the introduction of quotas for religious minorities in government posts, and the reservation of four Senate seats for minorities. Bhatti also spearheaded the organisation of a National Interfaith Consultation in July 2010, which brought together senior religious leaders of all faiths from across Pakistan and resulted in a joint declaration against terrorism.

== Assassination ==
Bhatti had been the recipient of death threats since 2009, when he spoke in support of Pakistani Christians attacked in the 2009 Gojra riots in Punjab Province. These threats increased following his support for Asia Bibi, a Pakistani Christian sentenced to death in 2010 for blasphemy. The United States had tried to obtain increased security for him and get him an armoured car but was unsuccessful. Bhatti himself foretold his death and recorded a video, which was to be released in case of his death, where he said "I believe in Jesus Christ who has given his own life for us, and I am ready to die for a cause. I'm living for my community ... and I will die to defend their rights."

According to the BBC, Bhatti was travelling to work through a residential district, having just left his mother's home, when his vehicle was sprayed with bullets. At the time of the attack he was alone, without any security. His driver reports having stopped the car and ducked when he saw armed men approaching rather than attempting to evade the threat. Bhatti was taken to a nearby hospital, but he was pronounced dead on arrival. Leader of the Pakistani Taliban Asmatullah Muiawiya (killed in an air strike in 2017) told the BBC that his group carried out the attack because Bhatti was a "known blasphemer." Paul Bhatti, Bhatti's brother, became Minister of National Harmony and Minority Affairs as well as Chairman of the APMA following the assassination. A Christian who had criticised Pakistan's blasphemy laws, his death follows that of Punjab Province governor Salman Taseer, who was also killed on 4 January 2011, amid the controversy over the blasphemy law.

On the day following Bhatti's assassination, hundreds of Christian demonstrators reportedly took to the streets across Punjab, with protesters burning tires and demanding justice. According to Minorities Concern of Pakistan, "Investigators are divided over the assassination case with some in the Islamabad police pointing the fingers at the Taliban and al-Qaeda". A pamphlet found at his crime scene mentioned the Punjabi Taliban. Later in 2011, an attempt was also made to shift the blame to "internal squabbles" among Christians. According to the same group, the identity of Bhatti's murderer was still unknown. In the months that followed, minority groups in Pakistan demanded the formation of a commission to probe the Bhatti case.

=== Reactions ===
Domestic

- Farahnaz Ispahani, an aide to President Asif Ali Zardari, condemned the assassination, saying: "This is a concerted campaign to slaughter every liberal, progressive and humanist voice in Pakistan." President Zardari vowed to combat the forces of obscurantism, and said, "we will not be intimidated nor will we retreat." The government declared three days of mourning. However, when the prime minister, Yousaf Raza Gillani, led a two-minute silence in parliament, three members of the Jamiat Ulema-i-Islam party remained seated. Rafi Usmani, the grand mufti of Pakistan, referred to the possibility of the assassination being "an American conspiracy to defame the government of Pakistan, Muslims and Islam." The Pakistani delegate to the United Nations Human Rights Council, Asim Ahmad, said that it would not be right to link Bhatti's murder to the issue of blasphemy. Ahmad said freedom of speech could not justify defamation and blasphemy; "It is important to prevent the deliberate campaign of defamation of Islam and its Prophet."

Foreign

- The European Union condemned the murder, and expressed their concern about the climate of intolerance on the controversial blasphemy laws, and the United Nations High Commissioner for Human Rights called on Pakistan to reform its blasphemy laws.

Leaders of Australia, Canada, France, Germany, India, Spain, UK, USA, and the Vatican expressed their shock and condemnation of his killing.

Church

- On the first anniversary of his death Pakistani Catholic priests called for the Pakistani Catholic bishops to open the cause of canonisation for Bhatti. Afterwards Pakistani bishops sent a formal request to the Pope to officially name Bhatti a martyr. Bhatti's canonisation is also supported by Cardinal Keith O'Brien, who has said that he could be patron of "Justice and Peace in Pakistan or even Asia". The Bible owned by Shahbaz Bhatti was placed in San Bartolomeo all'Isola as a relic of a 21st-century martyr, part of the memorial to 20th- and 21st-century martyrs.

== See also ==
- Blasphemy law
- List of Servants of God
