= Ministry of Minorities (Pakistan) =

Defunct Ministry of the Government of Pakistan

The Ministry of Minorities used to be a federal-level ministry in the Government of Pakistan. The head of the ministry was known as the Minister for Minorities and was a member of the federal cabinet.

Until September 2004, the functions of this ministry were carried out by the Minorities Wing of the former Ministry of Minorities, Culture, Sports, Tourism and Youth Affairs - but it remained underfunded for some time. This changed when it was upgraded to a fully-fledged, independent Ministry of Minorities, founded during the rule of President Pervez Musharraf.

In November 2008, the government (then led by the Pakistan People's Party (PPP)) invested in a larger ministry and renamed it the Ministry of Minorities Affairs. A Christian activist Shahbaz Bhatti was made the minister who served in this position until March 2, 2011, when he was assassinated in Islamabad.

In July 2011, the Government of Pakistan closed the Minorities Affairs Ministry as part of a decentralization plan that would see powers in this area transferred to the provinces. However, a new ministry was created with almost the same remit but under a different name, the Ministry for National Harmony. Shahbaz Bhatti's brother, Paul Bhatti, was appointed to lead it, as a "Special Advisor" to the Prime Minister.

In June 2013, under a newly elected government led by the Pakistan Muslim League (N), the Ministry of National Harmony was merged with a larger ministry, the Ministry of Religious Affairs. Some argue that this weakens minority representation at the highest level. Others say it is a positive move to 'mainstream' minority concerns and avoid marginalisation.
