= 2020 Karak temple attack =

Attack on Hindu temple in Pakistan

Coordinates: 33.2946°N 71.1019°E

On December 30, 2020 the Samadhi of Shri Paramhans Ji Maharaj, a revered Hindu saint and the Krishna Dwara temple situated in the Teri village in the Karak District of Khyber Pakhtunkhwa province of Pakistan was attacked and burned, by a mob of 1,500 local Muslims led by a local Islamic cleric and supporters of the Jamiat Ulema-e-Islam (F) (JUI–F) party. Following the incident, in order to avoid similar attack on worship places of minorities the "Protection of the Rights of Religious Minorities Bill" was introduced in the Senate of Pakistan. The bill was ultimately turned down by the Senate Standing Committee on Religious Affairs and Interfaith Harmony chaired by Jamiat Ulema-e-Islam (F) (JUI-F) senator Abdul Ghafoor Haideri.

== History ==
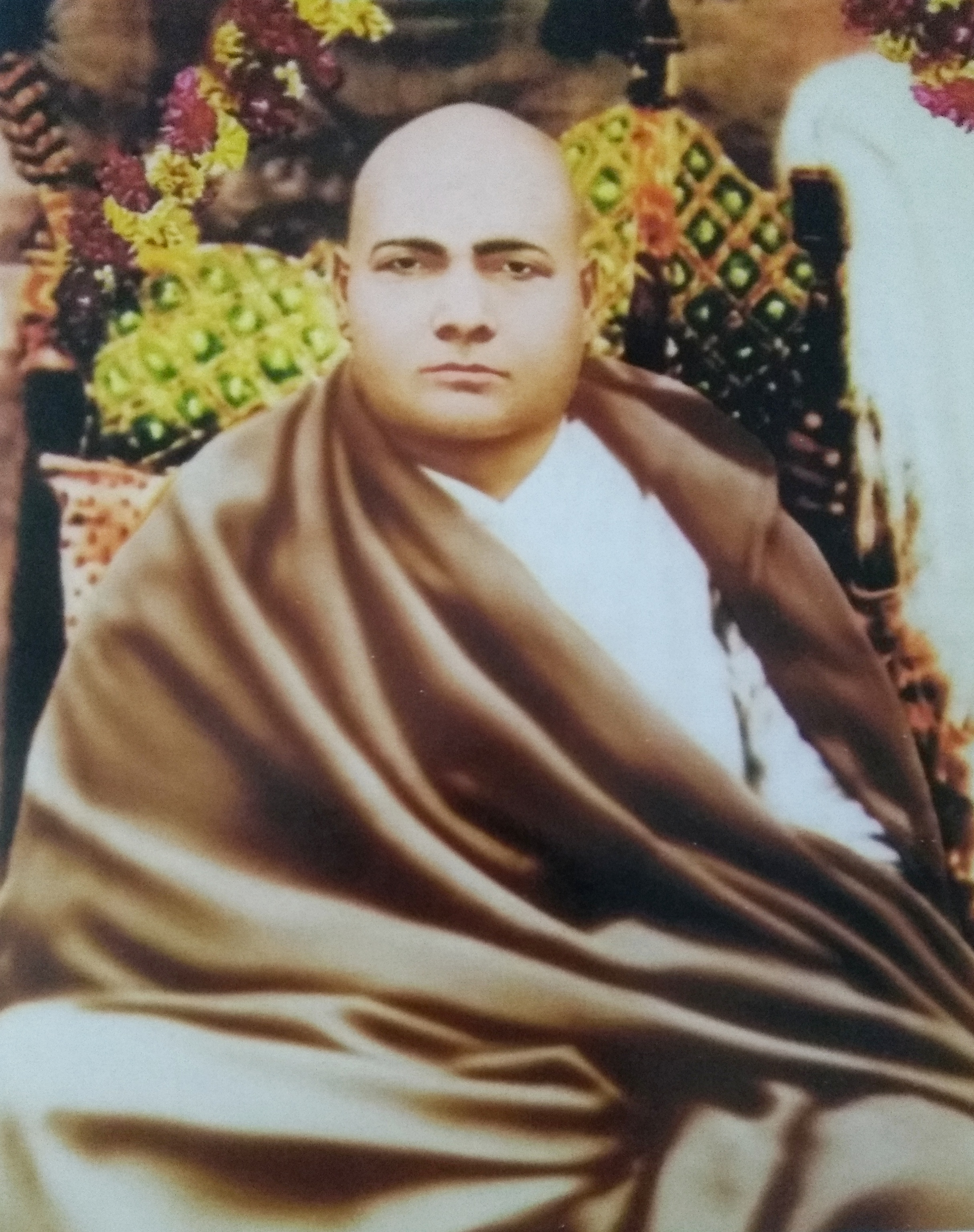
Paramhans Dayal

Paramhans Dayal is a revered Hindu saint. In July 1919, he was buried in Teri village of Karak District, where his samadi and the Krishna Dwara Mandir temple were built. Following the Partition of India and Pakistan, the temple was closed in 1947. In 1997, the temple was attacked and demolished. In 2015, the Supreme Court of Pakistan ordered the restoration of the Shri Paramhans Ji Maharaj's Samadhi and Krishna Dwara temple.

== Incident ==
As a part of renovation, there were plans to expand the temple after an adjacent house was purchased. This irked many locals and Islamic party supporters. In December 2020, a mob of around 1,500 local Muslims led by an Islamic cleric and supporters of Jamiat Ulema-e-Islam party attacked the temple and set fire to it. The extremists also posted video of their attack on the temple on social media. Advocate Rohit Kumar, a representative of the Hindu community, said the temple restoration did not exceed the agreed area and that the attackers had violated the agreement by vandalising the temple.

== Response ==
Pakistan's Human Rights Minister Shireen Mazari, Federal Parliamentary Secretary for Human Rights Lal Chand Malhi, Religious affairs minister Noor-ul-Haq Qadri condemned the temple attack. The Rimmel Mohydin, Pakistan campaigner at Amnesty International said that the destruction of the temple in an example of the persistent discrimination faced by the beleaguered Hindu community in Pakistan. The president of Pakistan Hindu Council, Gopal Kamuany criticized the local administratives for silently watching the temple desecration.

The Pakistan Prime Minister Imran Khan condemned the attack and tweeted that “I want to warn our people that anyone in Pakistan targeting our non-Muslim citizens or their places of worship will be dealt with strictly. Our minorities are equal citizens of this country.” In Karachi, the Hindu community held a protest outside the Supreme Court.

Indian ministry of External Affairs expressed "serious concerns” over the temple attack and asked Pakistan prime minister Imran Khan to take action. Nepali citizens protested outside the Pakistan embassy in Kathmandu against the temple desecration.

== Legal Response ==
26 people including the local cleric were arrested. Later 45 more people were arrested. FIR was registered against over 350 people. Eight police officials were suspended. On January 5, 2021, the Pakistan Supreme Court ordered the reconstruction of the vandalised temple.

Following the incident, a new bill "Protection of the Rights of Religious Minorities Bill" was introduced in the Senate of Pakistan. However, it was turned down by the Senate Standing Committee on Religious Affairs and Interfaith Harmony chaired by Jamiat Ulema-e-Islam (F) (JUI-F) senator Abdul Ghafoor Haideri. The Pakistan Peoples Party (PPP) Senator Krishna Kumari Kolhi walked out of the Senate during the meeting as a form of protest.

== See also ==
- 2014 Larkana temple attack
- 2019 Ghotki riots
- List of Hindu temples in Pakistan
