= 2014 Larkana temple attack =

Attacks targeting a Hindu Temple in Larkana, Pakistan

Burning of Hindu Temple and Dharmshala Larkana (Pakistan)
- Location: Larkana, Sindh, Pakistan
- Date: 15 March 2014
- Target: Hindu temple
- Perpetrator: Muslims

On 15 March 2014, a crowd of Muslims burnt a Hindu temple and a dharamshala in Larkana, Sindh, Pakistan, after unverified allegations of a Hindu youth desecrating a copy of the Quran.

== Background ==
According to police, few people saw burnt pages of Quran in a garbage bin near the home of Hindu man on the night of 15 March. While there is another version which details the Hindu man allegedly tearing the Koran pages and throwing them down in the street. Immediately, a crowd of 200 had gathered outside the Hindu temple and attacked it. The home of the Hindu youth who was accused of burning the book was surrounded as well, which prompted the security forces to fire warning shots and teargas shells. Police further confirmed that the desecrators were taken into custody and the temple was partly gutted, whereas the dharamshala was completely destroyed. Shops were then burnt in the bazaar and transport services were suspended. According to eyewitness accounts, policemen dressed the suspect Hindu in police uniform and whisked him away to a safer location.

== Repercussions ==
In the southwestern province of Balochistan, police clashed with protesters angry at the blasphemy which resulted in injuries for two protestors and one policeman. In Usta Muhammad, four shops belonging to Hindus were set ablaze.

== Further actions ==
Curfew was imposed in the Jinnah Bhag and some other parts of the city after mob ran berserk. Police took the Hindu into custody and if he was to be found guilty of burning Quran, he would be punished. Three people have been arrested for vandalism, while member each from Hindu and Muslim community will serve as the observers for investigation. Local sources including a policeman reported that the alleged blasphemer had recently moved into house rented from Muslim family and had mistakenly burnt the book. As a result of tension related to this blasphemy accusation, Holi celebrations were called off in many locations for security purposes.

While additional contingents of police and rangers were deployed in the affected areas, pillion riding on bike had been banned.

== Reactions ==
Muslim community leaders asserted that Islam does not allow for violence and claimed it as work of mischievous people. Hindu leaders said that if the suspect is guilty, then he should be punished. Pakistan Prime Minister Nawaz Sharif has asked the Sindh Government to take steps to protect minorities and expressed profound grief on the incident. Larkana's Hindu Panchayat President Kalpana Devi expressed her shock stating, "Our Dharamshala (community centre) has been gutted and the temple has been partially damaged. All the statues have been destroyed by the attackers." She also said, "I strongly condemn the desecration of the Holy Quran and demand the accused be punished if he really has committed [blasphemy]".

== See also ==
- 2019 Ghotki riots
- 2020 Karak temple attack
- 2021 Bhong temple attack
- Persecution of Hindus in Pakistan
