= 2019 Ghotki riots =

Series of attacks targeting Hindu temples in Pakistan

- Date: September 15, 2019
- Location: Ghotki, Sindh, Pakistan
- Type: Riot
- Cause: Alleged derogatory remarks made against Prophet Muhammed, found to be politically motivated
- Target: Sindh Public School, three Hindu temples including the Sacho Satram Das temple, and Hindu houses and shops
- Participants: At least 218 rioters

On September 15, 2019, in Ghotki city of Sindh province of Pakistan, a large number of extremist Muslims desecrated three Hindu temples, a private school and attacked shops and houses belonging to the Hindu community over the allegation of blasphemy against the Hindu principal “Notan Laal” of the Sindh Public School made by a school student. A delegation investigating the attack found that the attacks were pre-planned and had political support.

== Background ==
On 14 September, a Rajpoot student in the Sindh Public School in Ghotki complained to his father that the principal, Notan Laal, had allegedly made derogatory remarks against Prophet Muhammad while intoxicated. The student also made a video about this, which went viral. Following this, protesters filed an FIR against the principal on the night of 14 September.

On 15 September, thousands of supporters of Mian Mithoo held sit-ins on the main roads and marched towards the school. Mian Aslam was leading the mob. Mian Mitho, the brother of Mian Aslam, has allegedly been involved in the forced conversion of Hindu girls in the past. Mian Mitho denied his involvement in the attack.

The mob desecrated Hindu temples including the famous Sacho Satram Das temple, vandalised the school and attacked houses and shops belonging to the members of the Hindu community. The mobs also damaged sacred items inside the temple.

== Response ==
Cases against 218 people involved in the attack were registered in three separate cases.

Following the attack, many local Muslims in Ghotki held a rally to show solidarity with the Hindu community. Many Muslims spent the night in the temple to protect the Hindus, who were taking refuge inside it.

Bilawal Bhutto, Chairman of Pakistan Peoples Party (PPP) visited the Sacho Satram Dham temple which was desecrated and condemned the attack.

A delegation was formed by Ministry of Human Rights to investigate the attacks which found that the attacks on temples and riots were pre-planned and had political support. The delegation found that the principal accused of blasphemy actively supported a political party in the recent Ghotki by-elections and attacking him was politically motivated. The delegation also found that local police were reluctant to even register an FIR against the rioters.

== Aftermath ==
In 2024, the principal in question was acquitted of the blasphemy charge against him after spending five years in jail.

== See also ==
- 2020 Karak temple attack
- 2014 Larkana temple attack
- 2009 Gojra riots
- Persecution of Hindus in Pakistan
