= Muhammad Wali Razi =

Pakistani Islamic scholar and author (1939–2020)

- محمد ولی رازی

Personal life
- Born: 1 July 1939 Deoband, United Provinces, British India
- Died: 15 May 2020 (aged 80) Karachi, Sindh, Pakistan
- Parent: Muhammad Shafi Deobandi (father)
- Notable work: Hadi-e-Alam (Non-dotted Seerah)
- Education: Darul Uloom Karachi
- Occupation: Islamic scholar, author, biographer
- Relatives: Muhammad Rafi Usmani; Muhammad Taqi Usmani; Muhammad Zaki Kaifi

Religious life
- Religion: Islam
- Denomination: Sunni Islam
- Jurisprudence: Hanafi
- Movement: Deobandi

Muhammad Wali Razi (Urdu: محمد ولی رازی; 1 July 1939 – 15 May 2020) was a Pakistani Islamic scholar, biographer, and author. He was the son of Muhammad Shafi Deobandi, the former Grand Mufti of Pakistan, and the elder brother of Islamic scholars Muhammad Rafi Usmani and Muhammad Taqi Usmani. He gained widespread recognition in Urdu and Islamic literature for authoring Hadi-e-Alam, a biography of the Islamic prophet Muhammad written entirely without dotted letters (Ghair Manqoot).

== Early life and education ==
Muhammad Wali Razi was born on 1 July 1939 in Deoband, United Provinces, British India, into the scholarly Usmani family. Following the Partition of India in 1947, he migrated with his father, Muhammad Shafi Deobandi, and family to Pakistan, settling in Karachi.

He completed his traditional Islamic education (Dars-i Nizami) and specialization at Darul Uloom Karachi, where he studied under his father and other prominent scholars of the institution.

== Literary career and works ==
Razi devoted his career to teaching, academic research, and writing on Islamic history, jurisprudence, and Urdu literature. His magnum opus, Hadi-e-Alam (Urdu: ہادیِ عالم), is a comprehensive biography of Muhammad written exclusively using the eighteen undotted letters of the Urdu alphabet (san'at-e-ihmal or ghair manqoot). The book received critical acclaim from both religious scholars and Urdu literary critics for maintaining historical accuracy and fluency despite the strict orthographic constraint.

=== Selected works ===
- Hadi-e-Alam (Non-dotted biography of Muhammad)
- Tareekh-e-Islam Ke Chand Darakhshan Pehlu
- Tazkira-e-Akabir

== Death ==
Muhammad Wali Razi died on 15 May 2020 in Karachi at the age of 80 after a brief illness. His funeral prayer was led by his younger brother, Muhammad Rafi Usmani, at Darul Uloom Karachi, and he was buried in the institution's graveyard alongside his father.
