= Taqi Usmani bibliography =

The bibliography of Muhammad Taqi Usmani includes books, translations, commentaries, articles written by Pakistani Muslim jurist and scholar Taqi Usmani. Usmani is an authority in Islamic finance, law and scholarship.

Usmani has written more than 143 books in Arabic, English and Urdu. He is the chief-editor of Al-Balagh, a monthly journal of Darul Uloom Karachi. His books include Very Famous Urdu Tafsir Tauzeeh Al-Qur'an or Aasan Tarjuma-e-Qur'an,Takmilat Fatḥ al-mulhim, Uṣūl al-iftā’ wa-ādābuhu, An Introduction to Islamic Finance, The Meanings of the Noble Qur'an with explanatory notes, Islam aur Jidat Pasandi and Zikr-o-Fikr.

A pile of books by Usmani

== Arabic works ==
- Buḥūth fī qaḍāya fiqhīyah mu‘āṣirah (transl. Studies in contemporary jurisprudential issues).
- Fiqh al-buyū‘ ‘alá al-madhāhib al-arba‘ah (transl. Jurisprudence of sales according to the four madhhabs).
- Maqālāt al-‘Uthmānī (transl. Writings of Usmani)
- Ma hiya al-Nasraniya? (transl. What is Christianity?)
- Takmilat Fatḥ al-mulhim bi-sharḥ Ṣaḥīḥ al-Imām Muslim (transl. Supplement to Fath al-mulhim). Six-volume supplement completing Shabbir Ahmad Usmani's unfinished commentary on Sahih Muslim. Usmani began writing this work in 1977 and completed it in 1994. This work has forewords by Abd al-Fattah Abu Ghudda, Yusuf al-Qaradawi, Muhammad Mukhtar al-Sallami, and Abul Hasan Ali Nadwi.
- Uṣūl al-iftā’ wa-ādābuhu (transl. Principles of ifta and its etiquettes).

== English works ==
- An Introduction to Islamic Finance
- Causes and Remedies of the Present Financial Crisis from Islamic Perspective.
- Contemporary Fataawa
- Islamic Months: Merits and Precepts
- The Authority of Sunnah
- The Historic Judgment on Interest Delivered in the Supreme Court of Pakistan
- The Language of the Friday Khutbah
- The Noble Quran: Meaning With Explanatory Notes

== Urdu works ==
- Ahkām-e-Etikāf (transl. The rules of Etikāf). Translation is published separately.
- Akabir-e-Deoband Kya Thy? (transl. The Scholars of Deoband Islamic Seminary)
- Dars Tarmizi
- Fard ki Islāh
- Fatawa Usmani
- Hakeemul Ummat Kay Siyasi Afkar (transl. The Political Thoughts of Ashraf Ali Thanwi)
- Islāhi Majālis(7 Vols.)
- Islahi Khutbat (23 Vols.)
- Islah-e-Muashara
- Islam aur Jidat Pasandi (transl. Islam and Modernism). English translation is published separately.
- Islam aur Siyasat-e-Hazirah (transl. Islam and Contemporary Politics)
- Islam Aur Siyasi Nazriyat
- Ma'asir Hazrat Arifi (transl. Sayings and memories of Abdul Hai Arifi)
- Maghribi Mumalik Kay Jadeed Fiqhi Masa'il Aur Un Ka Hal
- Mere Walid – Mere Shaikh
- Nuqoosh-e-Raftigan
- Tauzeeh Al-Qur'an or Aasan Tarjuma-e-Qur'an'
- Uloomu-l-Qur'an, Usmāni wrote an introduction to Ma'ariful Qur'an, which he separated and revised later as Uloomu-l-Qur'an. Its English translation has been rendered by Swaleh Siddiqi as An Approach to the Quranic Sciences.
- Taqleed Ki Shari'i Hasiyat (transl. Legal Status of Following a Madhab). Translation is published separately.
- Taqrīr-e-Tirmizi
- Zikr-o-Fikr

== Bibliography ==
- Zil Huma (January–June 2019). "Mufti Muhammad Taqi Usmani ki maroof tasnīfāt-o-tālifāt ka ta'ārufi jāyzah" [Interpretation of the leading books and compositions of Mufti Muhammad Taqi Usmani]. Rāhatul Qulūb. 3 (1): 197–224. Archived from the original on 28 January 2021.
- Youssef Azim Al-Siddiqi; Aznan Hassan (17 September 2020). "The Methodology of Muftī Muhammad Taqi Usmani in Presenting Unprecedented Financial Issues: Book of Sale of Ṣaḥīḥ al-Bukhārī as a Case Study)". Journal of Islam in Asia. 17 (2). International Islamic University Malaysia: 67–89.
- Zaharudin Nawi; Zunaidah Mohd. Marzuki (2017). "Mufti Muhammad Taqi 'Usmani and his scholarly contribution to the Qur'anic studies". Al-Irsyad: Journal of Islamic and Contemporary Issues. 2 (1). Kolej Universiti Islam Antarabangsa Selangor: Faculty of Islamic Civilization Studies: 94–109.
