= Abdul Haq Baloch (politician) =

Pakistani islamic scholar

Maulana Abdul Haq Baloch

Personal life
- Born: 5 January 1947
- Died: 16 March 2010 (aged 63)
- Political party: Jamat e Islami
- Education: University of Karachi; Darul Uloom Karachi

Religious life
- Religion: Islam
- Denomination: Sunni

Muslim leader
- Teacher: Muhammad Shafi; Rafi Usmani; Taqi Usmani

Member of the 7th National Assembly of Pakistan
- In office 1985–1888

Maulana Abdul Haq Baloch (5 January 1947 – 16 March 2010) was a Pakistani Islamic scholar and politician from Kech District, Balochistan. He served as member of the National Assembly of Pakistan from 1985 to 1988, and belongs to Jamaat e Islami.
