= Mahmood Ashraf Usmani =

Pakistani Mufti and writer (1951–2022)

Mufti Mahmood Ashraf Usmani
- مفتی محمود اشرف عثمانی

Personal life
- Born: 14 May 1951 Lahore, Pakistan
- Died: 27 February 2022 (aged 70) Karachi, Pakistan
- Parent: Zaki Kaifi (father)
- Education: Jamia Ashrafia; University of Madinah
- Website: mahmoodashrafusmani.com

Religious life
- Religion: Islam
- Institute: Jamia Ashrafia; Darul Uloom Karachi
- Profession: Mufti, researcher, writer

Mahmood Ashraf Usmani (14 May 1951 – 27 February 2022) was a Pakistani Islamic scholar, jurist and author who headed the Dar-ul-Ifta at Darul Uloom Karachi. He was an alumnus of Jamia Ashrafia and the Islamic University of Madinah. He reportedly issued over a hundred thousand religious edicts and authored about three dozen books on hadith, mysticism, jurisprudence and tafsir.

== Biography ==
Mahmood Ashraf Usmani was born on 14 May 1951 in Lahore into the Usmani family of Deoband. His father Zaki Kaifi was an Urdu language poet, and the eldest son of Islamic scholar Muhammad Shafi.

Usmani began memorizing the Qur'an with Iftikhar Ahmad Qaiser, and completed memorizing it with Ronaq Ali. He received his early education at home and graduated in the traditional Dars-i Nizami from the Jamia Ashrafia, in Lahore in 1970. He taught at the Ashrfia seminary for two years and moved to study at the University of Madinah. Meanwhile, his father Zaki Kaifi died, and he continued to teach at his alma mater Jamia Ashrafia. From 1990, he joined the Darul Uloom Karachi, where he taught Sahih al-Bukhari and held the post of Mufti.

Usmani died in Karachi on 27 February 2022, at the age of 70. His funeral prayers were offered at 11:30am at Darul Uloom Karachi, and he was buried there. JUI-F chief Maulana Fazl-ur-Rehman contacted Taqi Usmani and expressed his condolences.

== Literary works ==
Usmani issued over an hundred thousand religious edicts. He authored about three dozen books on Hadith, Sufism, Fiqh and Tafsir.

- علم وحلم [Knowledge and forbearance] (3 ed.). 2001. OCLC 53937802.
- حضرت معاويه اور تاريخى حقائق [Hazrat Muawiyah and historical facts] (4 ed.). 2001. OCLC 51172290.
- Amusement and play and its limits in Islam (2 ed.). 2001. OCLC 51172649.
- Bayānultafsīr : Taʻūūz, Tasmīyah aur Sūrah-yi Fātiḥah - بيان التفسير : تعؤز تسميه اور سوده فاتحه. 2002. OCLC 56794165.
- Aqīdah-yi Imāmat aur Ḥadīs̲-i G̲h̲adīr - عقيدۀ امامت و حديث غدير (3 ed.). 2005. OCLC 74986362.
- Ḣazrati Muovii︠a︡ (r.z). 2009. OCLC 472891166.

== See also ==
- List of Deobandis
