= Brass Crescent =

The Brass Crescent is an umbrella term for the blogs, websites, newsfeeds and other new media devoted to analysis and discussion of modern Islam. Coined by Muslim blogger Aziz Poonawalla, founder of the weblog City of Brass and cofounder (with Shahed Amanullah) of the Brass Crescent Awards, the Brass Crescent "is forging a new synthesis of Islam and modernity, and is the intellectual heir to the traditions of philosophy and learning that were once the hallmark of Islamic civilization - a heritage scarcely recognizable today in the Islamic world after a century's ravages of colonialism, tyrants, and religious fundamentalism." Since the term 'Brass Crescent' is an informal designation, any blog or website run by Muslims or dedicated to the discussion of Islam can ostensibly claim membership.

== History ==
In 1998, Halalfire Media LLC was founded by Shahed Amanullah to organize and aggregate the dozens of Muslim-oriented travel, education, news and commerce websites launched in the late 90s. (The term halal is Arabic for 'permissible' and refers to behaviors, foods and practices endorsed by Islamic law.) In 2001, Amanullah launched altmuslim.com, an independent news and opinion website focused on issues affecting Muslims worldwide. As personal blogs became increasingly popular in the years that followed, a large and informal conversation emerged among Muslim bloggers of various and often conflicting political and personal backgrounds. Muslims and critics of Islam such as author Robert Spencer began with increasing frequency to engage in debates with ordinary, and often anonymous bloggers. To facilitate this ongoing exchange, Aziz Poonawalla launched the Carnival of Brass in 2006. The Carnival of Brass aggregates essays and commentary from an array of Muslim-run and Islam-themed blogs, making them available in a live RSS newsfeed.

== The Brass Crescent Awards ==
The Brass Crescent Awards were launched in 2004 to honor "the best writers and thinkers of the emerging Muslim blogosphere". Nominees are chosen by committee and voted on by the public. Controversy arose in 2007 when several conservative Muslim bloggers voiced concern that the nomination process was unclear, and accused the nominating committee of being biased in favor of liberal and nontraditional Muslim bloggers. Brasscrescent.org responded by clarifying the nomination process and unveiling a new nominating committee.

== Notable figures ==
Several contemporary Muslim writers began their careers as bloggers within the Brass Crescent. G. Willow Wilson, author of the graphic novel CAIRO and an upcoming book titled The Butterfly Mosque, is a former contributor to Eteraz.org.
