= Islam and Modernism =

1990 book by Taqi Usmani

- Cover of English Version
- Author: Taqi Usmani
- Original title: اسلام اور جدت پسندی
- Language: Urdu
- Subject: Islam and modernity
- Genre: Essay
- Publication date: 1990
- Publication place: Pakistan
- Media type: Hardcover
- Pages: 140
- ISBN: 978-8174351975 English Version
- OCLC: 514205785
- Dewey Decimal: 197.5
- LC Class: BP166.14.M63 U86 1999

Islam and Modernism (Urdu: اسلام اور جدت پسندی) is a book originally written in Urdu by Pakistani scholar Taqi Usmani on Islam and modernity. The original title is "Islam aur Jiddat Pasandi". Two years later it was translated into English with the title Islam and Modernism. It was first published in 1990. In this book the author discusses many western issues that have been brainwashing Muslims for a long time. He is not against progress per se, but believes that common Western practices have nothing to do with material and industrial progress. It gives a logical idea of Islamic law and also describes how people have tried to change it to suit themselves in the past and also in the present. The book challenged the modern mindset with logical arguments. It gives a meaning to modernism and discusses how Islam encourages modernism. In this book, the author has also presented that, in the name of progress and modernity, the terrible fitnah of anti-Islamic beliefs and destruction of character that is engulfing the world, is actually stupidity and backwardness. It has discussed modernity, science, industrial revolution, Jihad etc. with Islam. The author has done considerable research to compile situations from the past to make his argument comprehensive. The book is foreworded by the author himself.

== Background ==
Taqi Usmani writes in the foreword about the book:

For the last twenty seven years I have been writing on different aspects of the practical implementation of Islam and Islamic solution of ever new problems arising in the different spheres of life. Most of those articles were being published in the monthly Journal "Al-Balagh". A collection of such articles had been published in Urdu about seventeen years ago under the caption "Asr-e-Hazir Mein Islam Kaiysay Nafiz Ho?" (How to Implement Islam in the present time?) consisting of about 750 pages. Even after the publication of this book I had the opportunity of writing on other aspects of the same subject, and friends expressed a desire that these latter articles may also be included in the same book. But I found that an addition of these articles in that book would make it a voluminous book, making it difficult for the readers to get full benefit from it. Further, these articles pertained to different topics like politics, law, economy, education, social life and individual reforms, etc., and a book of that size would have a disadvantage for those who would be interested in a single topic for which they would have to buy the whole book, many of whose articles may not be of their interest. For this reason I thought that it would be more appropriate to compile articles on different subjects separately, rather than collecting them in one book.

—

== Content ==
The chapters and topics covered in the book are:

1. Islam and Modernity
2. Islam and Industrial Revolution
3. The Demands of Time
4. Research or Distortion
5. New Interpretation of Islam
6. Scholars of Islam and Papacy
7. Science and Islam
8. The Conqueror of Space
9. Islam and Conquer of the Universe
10. Ijtihad
11. Aggressive and Defensive Jihad

== Translations ==
=== Bengali ===
In 2002, the book was translated into Bengali by Shamsul Islam, edited by Abul Fatah Muhammad Yahya.

=== English ===
Muhammad Saleh Siddiqui translated it into English in 2002.

== See also ==
- Taqi Usmani bibliography
