= Islam and modernity =

Islam and modernity is a topic of discussion in contemporary sociology of religion. The history of Islam chronicles different interpretations and approaches. Modernity is a complex and multidimensional phenomenon rather than a unified and coherent one. It has historically had different schools of thought moving in many directions.

== Industrial Revolution ==
In the 18th century, Europe was undergoing major transformations as the new ideas of the Enlightenment, which stressed the importance of science, rationality, and human reason; and the new technologies of the Industrial Revolution swept across Europe, giving Europeans great power and influence. In the last quarter of the 18th century, the gap widened between the technical skills of some western and northern European countries and those of the rest of the world.

The rise of modern Europe coincided with what many scholars refer to as the decline of the Ottoman Empire, which by the 18th century was facing political, military, and economic breakdown. While prior to the 18th century the Ottomans had regarded themselves to be either of superior or, by the mid-18th century, of equal strength to Europe, by the end of the 18th century the power relationship between the Ottoman Empire and Europe began to shift in Europe's favor.

=== French occupation of the Ottoman Empire ===
In 1798 Napoleon Bonaparte's army occupied the Ottoman province of Egypt and killed roughly 3,000 Egyptians. Although the occupation was only three years, (followed by lingering hostility to the French) the experience ultimately exposed the Egyptian people to Enlightenment ideas and Europe's new technology.

=== Ottoman scholars in Europe ===
The exposure to European power and ideas would later inspire the new governor of Egypt, Muhammad Ali of Egypt, to draw on this technology to modernize Egypt, setting an example for the rest of the Ottoman Empire. The Ottoman government began to open embassies and send officials to study in Europe. This created conditions for the "gradual formation of a group of reformers with a certain knowledge of the modern world and a conviction that the empire must belong to it or perish". One of the scholars sent by Muhammad Ali to Europe in 1826 was Rifa'a Rafi' al-Tahtawi. The five years he spent in Paris left a permanent mark on him. After his return to Egypt he wrote about his impressions of France and translated numerous European works into Arabic. Tahtawi was impressed with Europe's technological and scientific advancement and political philosophy. Having studied Islamic Law, he argued that "it was necessary to adapt the Sharia to new circumstances" and that there was not much difference between "the principles of Islamic law and those principles of 'natural law' on which the codes of modern Europe were based".

Like Tahtawi, Khayr al-Din was also sent to Paris where he spent four years. After his return from Europe he wrote a book in which he argued that the only way to strengthen the Muslim States was by borrowing ideas and institutions from Europe, and that this did not contradict the spirit of the Sharia.

=== Modernization reforms in the Ottoman Empire ===
In the period between 1839 and 1876 the Ottoman government began instituting large-scale reforms as a way to modernize and strengthen the empire. Known as the Tanzimat, many of these reforms involved adopting successful European practices that were considered antithetical to conservative Muslims such as confining sharia to family law. In addition to military and administrative reforms, Ottoman rulers implemented reforms in the sphere of education, law, and the economy. This included new universities and changes in curricula, as well as new economic systems and institutions. There were also European-inspired changes to law that restricted Islamic law to family affairs such as marriage and inheritance.

The Ottoman Empire was the first Muslim country where modernity surfaced, with major shifts in scientific and legal thought. In 1834, Ishak Efendi published Mecmua-i Ulum-i Riyaziye, a four volume text introducing many modern scientific concepts to the Muslim world. Kudsi Efendi also published Asrar al-Malakut in 1846 in an attempt to reconcile Copernican astronomy with Islam. The first modern Turkish chemistry text was published in 1848, and the first modern Biology text in 1865.

Eventually, the Turks adopted the metric system in 1869. The key figure in the Turkish modernist movement was Namık Kemal, the editor of a journal called Freedom. His goal was to promote freedom of the press, the separation of powers, equality before the law, scientific freedom, and a reconciliation between parliamentary democracy and the Qur'an.

=== The Greater Muslim world ===
The influence of modernism in the Muslim world resulted in a cultural revival. Dramatic plays became more common, as did newspapers. Notable European works were analyzed and translated.

Legal reform was attempted in Egypt, Tunisia, the Ottoman Empire, and Iran, and in some cases these reforms were adopted. Efforts were made to restrict the power of government. Polygamy was ended in India. Azerbaijan granted suffrage to women in 1918 (before several European countries).

At the recommendations of reform-minded Islamic scholars, western sciences were taught in new schools. Much of this had to do with the intellectual appeal of social Darwinism, since it led to the conclusion that an old-fashioned Muslim society could not compete in the modern world.

In 19th century Iran, Mirza Malkom Khan arrived after being educated in Paris. He created a newspaper called Qanun, where he advocated the separation of powers, secular law, and a bill of rights. Jamal al-Din al-Afghani, who was politically active in the Islamic world and published the pamphlet "Al-'Urwa al-Wuthqà" during a brief spell in France, proclaiming that Europe had become successful due to its laws and its science. He became critical of other Muslim scholars for stifling scientific thought, and hoped to encourage scientific inquiry in the Muslim world.

== Modernism, religion and ideology ==
=== Islamic modernism ===
Modernism impacted interpretations of Islam. One movement was Islamic Modernism, which was both an attempt to provide an Islamic response to the challenges presented by European colonial expansion, and an effort to reinvigorate and reform Islam from within as a way to counter the perceived weakness and decline of Muslim societies in the 19th and early 20th centuries. It called for "a 'reformation' or reinterpretation (ijtihad) of Islam", and emerged in the Muslim world from Egypt to Southeast Asia.

Islamic modernists argued that Islam and modernity were compatible and "asserted the need to reinterpret and reapply the principles and ideals of Islam to formulate new responses to the political, scientific, and cultural challenges of the West and of modern life". The reforms they proposed challenged the status quo maintained by the conservative Muslim scholars (ulama), who saw the established law as the ideal order that had to be followed and upheld the doctrine of taqlid (imitation / blind following). Islamic modernists saw the resistance to change on the part of the conservative ulama as a major cause for the problems the Muslim community was facing as well as its inability to counter western hegemony.

==== Modernists ====
Jamal al-Din al-Afghani (1838–1897) is regarded as one of the pioneers of Islamic modernism. He believed that Islam was compatible with science and reason and that in order to counter European power the Muslim world had to embrace progress.

Muhammad Abduh (1849–1905) was a disciple and collaborator of al-Afghani. He was even more influential than his master and is often referred to as the founder of Islamic modernism. Abduh was born and raised in Egypt and was a scholar of Islam (alim). He taught at al-Azhar and other institutions and in 1899 became Mufti of Egypt. Abduh believed that the Islamic world was suffering from an inner decay and was in need of a revival. Asserting that "Islam could be the moral basis of a modern and progressive society", he was critical of both secularists and the conservative ulama. He called for a legal reform and the reinterpretation (ijtihad) of Islamic law according to modern conditions. While critical of the West, he believed that it was necessary to borrow or assimilate what was good from it. Abduh became a leading judge in Egypt after political activities in Paris as al-Afghani's assistant. He pushed for secular law, religious reform, and education for girls. He hoped that Egypt would ultimately become a free republic, much like how France had transformed from an absolute monarchy.

Muhammad Rashid Rida (1869–1935) also became active in the Egyptian modernization movement as Abduh's disciple, although he was born and educated in Syria. Al-Manar was his journal, through which he initially advocated greater openness to science and foreign influence. He also stated that sharia was relatively silent about agriculture, industry, and trade, and that these areas of knowledge needed renewal. He would eventually evolve to conservative positions close to Wahhabism.

Qasim Amin was another reformer in Egypt and Abduh's disciple who was heavily concerned with the rights of women. Khayr al-Din al-Tunisi was similarly educated in Paris around the same time. He surveyed the political systems of 21 European countries in an effort to reform Tunisia.

Notable Modernists on the Indian subcontinent include Sayyid Ahmad Khan (1817–1898) and Muhammad Iqbal (1877–1938) in the Indian subcontinent (the latter was also the conceiver of the modern state of Pakistan). Like al-Afghani and Abduh, they rejected the doctrine of taqlid and asserted the need for Islam to be reinterpreted according to modern conditions.

Other Modernists include Mahmud Tarzi of Afghanistan, Chiragh Ali of India, Ahmad Dahlan of Java, and Wang Jingzhai of China.

Although Islamic modernists were subject to the criticism that the reforms they promoted amounted to westernizing Islam, their legacy was significant and their thought influenced future generations of reformers.

==== Pakistan and Turkey ====
Muhammad Ali Jinnah, the founder of Pakistan, was also a prominent Muslim modernist of the twentieth century.

In some parts of the world, the project of Islamic modernity continued from the same trajectory before World War I. This was especially the case in the new Republic of Turkey, under Mustafa Kemal Atatürk. But in Egypt, Hassan al-Banna founded the Muslim Brotherhood, the first Islamist organization, which had no interest in reinterpreting Islam to make it compatible with modernity.

Turkey has continued to be at the forefront of modernising Islam. In 2008 its Department of Religious Affairs launched a review of all the hadiths, the sayings of Mohammed upon which most of Islamic law is based. The School of Theology at Ankara University undertook this forensic examination with the intent of removing centuries of often conservative cultural baggage and rediscovering the spirit of reason in the original message of Islam. Fadi Hakura from London's Chatham House likens these revisions to the Reformation that took place in Protestant Christianity in the 16th Century. Turkey has also trained hundreds of women as theologians, and sent them senior imams known as vaizes all over the country, away from the relatively liberal capital and coastal cities, to explain these re-interpretations at town hall meetings.

=== After World War I ===
The aftermath of World War I resulted in the fall of the Ottoman Empire and the domination of the Middle East by European powers such as Britain and France. Intellectual historians such as Peter Watson suggest that World War I marks the end of the main Islamic modernist movements, and that this is the point where many Muslims "lost faith with the culture of science and materialism", but that several parallel intellectual streams emerged thereafter.

=== Arab socialism ===
Arab socialism of the Arab Socialist Ba'ath Party and Nasserite movement emerged as a stream of thought during decolonialization of Arab countries. It emphasized ethnicity, culture, politics and played down the role of religion. Its popularity peaked in the 50s and 60s.

As a political ideology based on an amalgamation of Pan-Arabism and socialism, Arab socialism is distinct from the much broader tradition of socialist thought in the Arab world which predates Arab socialism by as much as 50 years. Michel Aflaq, the principal founder of ba'athism and the Ba'ath Party, coined the term in order to distinguish his version of socialist ideology from the Marxist socialism in Eastern Europe and Eastern Asia, and social democracy and democratic socialism in Western Europe, Australia, and New Zealand.

The Six-Day War between Israel and its neighbours ended in a decisive loss for the Muslim side. Many in the Islamic world saw this as the failure of socialism. It was at this point that "fundamental and militant Islam began to fill the political vacuum created".

=== Islamic fundamentalism ===
In the late 20th century an Islamic Revival or Islamic Awakening developed in the Muslim World. (Islamic fundamentalism is the common term in the West used to refer to contemporary Islamic revivalism, according to John Esposito.)

It was manifested in greater religious piety and in a growing adoption of Islamic culture. One striking example of it is the increase in attendance at the Hajj, the annual pilgrimage to Mecca, which grew from 90,000 in 1926 to 2 million in 1979. But the said increase in the number of pilgrims may also be attributed to other factors such as increase in populations, modern transportation facilities and to some extent the over all financial prosperity of the Muslims all over the world thus making the Pilgrimage affordable to more and more Muslim populations.

Two of the most important events that fueled or inspired the resurgence were the Arab oil embargo and subsequent quadrupling of the price of oil in the mid-1970s, and the 1979 Iranian Revolution that established an Islamic republic in Iran under Ayatollah Khomeini. The first created a flow of many billions of dollars from Saudi Arabia to fund Islamic books, scholarships, fellowships, and mosques around the world; the second undermined the assumption that Westernization strengthened Muslim countries and was the irreversible trend of the future.

The revival is a reversal of the Westernisation approach common in Arab and Asian governments earlier in the 20th century. It is often associated with the political Islamic movement, Islamism, and other forms of re-Islamisation. While the revival has also been accompanied by some religious extremism and attacks on civilians and military targets by the extremists, this represents only a small part of the revival.

The revival has also seen a proliferation of Islamic extremist groups in the Middle East and elsewhere in the Muslim World, who have voiced their anger at perceived exploitation as well as materialism, Westernization, democracy and modernity, which are most commonly associated with accepting Western secular beliefs and values. The spread of secularism has caused great concerns among many Islamic political groups. It has been the reasoning for the Islamization of politics and protest, due to the large Muslim majority in the Middle East as well as the region's imperial past. For Islamic countries in the Middle East, there is not necessarily a problem as such with modernity, however, "the problem is when modernity comes wrapped with westernization, with absolutely and utterly rampant materialism".

In the book Political Islam: Religion and Politics in the Arab World (1994), the author N. Ayubi explained what he believes to be the two main concerns of Islamic political movements and extremist groups in the Middle East:

1. The Western belief in a bureaucratic state; and
2. The secular values and beliefs associated with concepts such as modernity.

According to John Esposito:

The tendency to judge the actions of Muslims in splendid isolation, to generalize from the actions of the few to the many, to disregard similar excesses committed in the name of other religions and ideologies ... is not new.

The number of militant Islamic movements calling for "an Islamic state and the end of Western influence" is relatively small. According to polls taken in 2008 and 2010 by Pew and Gallop, pluralities of the population in Muslim-majority countries are undecided as to what extent religion (and certain interpretations of) should influence public life, politics, and the legal system.

== People ==
- Namık Kemal
- Mirza Malkom Khan
- Qasim Amin
- Mahmud Tarzi
- Sayyid Ahmad Khan
- Kijai Hadji Ahmad Dachlan
- Jamal al-Din al-Afghani
- Allama Muhammad Iqbal
- Muhammad Abduh
- Muhammad Rashid Rida

== Books ==
- Islam and Modernism by Taqi Usmani
- What Went Wrong?: Western Impact and Middle Eastern Response by Bernard Lewis
- The Lexus and the Olive Tree, Thomas Friedman
- Jihad vs. McWorld, Benjamin Barber
- Islams and Modernities', Aziz al-Azmeh
- إشكالية التراث والحداثة في الفكر العربي المعاصر (The Dilemma of Tradition and Modernity in Contemporary Arab Thought) محمد حسين الرفاعي

== See also ==
- Islam and secularism
- Islam and democracy
- Cultural Muslims
- Tafazzul Husain Kashmiri
- Islamic Modernism

Reform movements within Islam:

- Tanzimat, Ottoman Empire
- Liberal movements within Islam
- Islamic feminism

Nation specific:

- Religious intellectualism in Iran
- Religious traditionalism in Iran

Other religions:

- Modernism (Roman Catholicism)
- Modern Orthodox Judaism
- Buddhist modernism
