= Zaki Kaifi =

Urdu Poet, Scholar and elder brother of Muhammad Taqi Usmani

Muhammad Zaki Kaifi
- محمد زکی کیفی

Personal life
- Born: 2 July 1926 Deoband, United Provinces, British India
- Parent: Muhammad Shafi Deobandi (father)
- Notable work: Kaifiyat
- Education: Darul Uloom Deoband
- Occupation: Poet, Islamic scholar
- Relatives: Muhammad Rafi Usmani; Muhammad Taqi Usmani; Muhammad Wali Razi

Religious life
- Religion: Islam
- Denomination: Sunni Islam
- Jurisprudence: Hanafi
- Movement: Deobandi

Muhammad Zaki Kaifi (Urdu: محمد زکی کیفی; was a Pakistani Urdu poet and the founder of the Idara-e-Islamiyat in Lahore. He was the son of Muhammad Shafi Deobandi and the elder brother of Muhammad Taqi Usmani. His poetry collection, Kaifiyat, was published after his death. His poetry continues the ghazal tradition of Urdu poetry, and he is regarded as a contemporary of Jigar Moradabadi and Hasrat Mohani.

== Early life ==
Zaki Kaifi was born on 22 Dhu al-Hijjah 1344 AH (2 July 1926) in Deoband, a town in united India. The Sufi mentor of his father, Ashraf Ali Thanwi, suggested the name "Muhammad Zaki". A chronogram name, "Saeed Akhtar" (1344 AH), was also given to him. He received his primary education at Darul Uloom Deoband. He formed a spiritual connection with Ashraf Ali Thanwi, and he became his disciple in childhood. Under Thanwi's guidance, he studied the well-known Sufi text Pand-e-Attar lesson by lesson.

Kaifi died on 10 Muharram 1395 AH (1975).

== Role in the Pakistan Movement ==
Zaki Kaifi's father, Muhammad Shafi Deobandi, was one of the founding leaders of Pakistan. Zaki Kaifi supported his father in his work and was an enthusiastic advocate of the creation of Pakistan. He stood beside his father at the North-West Frontier Province referendum, the Lahore Conference, and the Hyderabad Conference. He also worked with young men of Deoband to form an organisation that guarded neighbourhoods at night during communal riots and protected Muslims.

After the creation of Pakistan, his entire family migrated to Pakistan. However, following his father's wishes, Zaki Kaifi remained in India and completed his father's unfinished work.

== Kaifiyat ==
Zaki Kaifi's poetry collection, Kaifiyat, was published after his death by the institution he had founded. It contains a selection of his hamd (praise of God), na'at (poetry in praise of the Prophet Muhammad), ghazals, national and patriotic poems, and qitas (epigrammatic verses).

== Bibliography ==
- Usmani, Muhammad Taqi (2007). "Janab Muhammad Zaki Kaifi". Naqoosh-e-Raftegan (in Urdu). pp. 22–55.
