= Journal of Arabic and Islamic Studies =

- Discipline: Middle East and Islam
- Language: English
- Edited by: Lutz Edzard and Stephan Guth

Publication details
- History: 1995-present
- Publisher: Oslo University (Norway)
- Open access: Yes

Standard abbreviations
- ISO 4: J. Arab. Islam. Stud.

Indexing
- ISSN: 0806-198X
- OCLC no.: 46814291

Links
- Journal homepage

The Journal of Arabic and Islamic Studies (JAIS) is an international, peer-reviewed academic journal. It was founded in 1995 by Joseph N. Bell from the University of Bergen, Norway, and Petr Zemánek from Charles University in Prague. The current editors are Lutz Edzard and Stephan Guth, both of Oslo University.

The journal is open access. Its stated aims are to promote the study of history, language, literature and culture through the publication of research articles. The journal receives in excess of 250,000 visits per annum, making it the world's most widely read journal in the field of Arabic, Islamic and Middle Eastern Studies.

Volumes from 1995 to 2002 were published on paper by Edinburgh University Press. The journal is now published electronically on its primary site hosted by the Department of Culture Studies and Oriental Languages (IKOS), (Note: "Journals". Oslo University. Archived from the original on 2022-06-01.) Oslo University.

== Editorial board ==
Its editorial board are: Aziz al-Azmeh, Frédéric Bauden, Michael G. Carter, Kinga Dévényi, Lutz E. Edzard, Antonella Ghersetti, Stephan Guth, Jaakko Hämeen-Anttila, Carole Hillenbrand, Jacob Høigilt, David A. King, Pierre Larcher, Stefan Leder, Wilferd Madelung, Juan Quesada Martos, Alex Metcalfe, James E. Montgomery, Ute Pietruschka, Paul G. Starkey, John O. Voll, and Petr Zemánek. (Note: "Editorial Team". Journal of Arabic and Islamic Studies. Archived from the original on 2022-06-01.)

== Abstracting and indexing ==
The journal is abstracted and indexed in: (Note: "Journals". Information Matrix for the Analysis of Journal (in English and Spanish).)

- ATLA Religion Database
- IBZ Online
- Index Islamicus
- Linguistic Bibliography
- Modern Language Association Database
