= An Introduction to Islamic Finance =

1998 book by Taqi Usmani

- Cover
- Author: Taqi Usmani
- Language: English
- Subject: Islamic banking and finance
- Genre: Reference work
- Publisher: Kluwer Law International
- Publication date: 9 June 1998
- Publication place: Pakistan
- Media type: Hardcover; PDF
- Pages: 125
- ISBN: 978-8171012367 English Version
- OCLC: 49495202
- Dewey Decimal: 332/.0917/671
- LC Class: HG187.4 .U86 2002

An Introduction to Islamic Finance is a book written by Pakistani scholar Taqi Usmani on Islamic banking and finance. The book remains one of the gateway publications on Islamic finance. Most of the focus of the book is on banking rather than fund management. The author urges Islamic banks to develop their own culture, as ultimately it is the value system that matters. The book displays Usmani's pragmatism, and the clarity of the solutions offered which he believes to be Sharia compliant.

== Presentation ==
The book was completed on 9 June 1998, as indicated at the end of the author's introduction, and was published several times in paper format:

- Karachi: Idara Isha'at-e-Diniyat (P) Ltd. (1 January 1999).
- Netherlands: Kluwer Law International (1 January 2001), in Arab and Islamic Laws Series.
- Karachi: Maktaba maāriful qur'an (2002).

The book has been translated and published in Urdu:

- Islamī binkārī kī yunādī, translated by Muḥammad Zāhid, Fayṣal Abād: Maktabat al-Ārifī, 1428H.

In addition, the book has just been translated and published in Arabic:

- Muqddima fī al-tamwīl al-islāmī, translated by Umar Aḥmad Kashkār, Damascus: Dār al-Rawād, 2019.

An electronic version of the book is available online on the author's official website. This online publication makes the book accessible to the general public far from the geographical boundaries or logistical constraints that may stand against the acquisition of a paper version of the book.

== Content ==
This book is not an original writing but rather a compilation of articles and conference papers as the author states in his introduction. The author begins his work with an introductory chapter presenting the characteristics of Islamic economic thought, the relationship between the human, the divine and the money, and a critique of the capitalist economy. He has taken care to cover all the contracts of Islamic finance, each with a dedicated article in order to produce this book. Each chapter dedicated to a contract explains its legal regime in classical Islamic law and its use and role in the Islamic banking, finance and insurance industry. One chapter is dedicated to Islamic funds and another to the principle of limited liability in Islamic law.

Mohyedine HAJJAR wrote,

In our opinion, we thought it was more appropriate to add chapters dedicated to Islamic banking and Islamic insurance in order to cover the whole discipline in this book. We thus note that the book is characterized by its legal dimension which is in fact the essential characteristic of Islamic finance. A student in finance, management, law or economics aiming to learn about Islamic finance needs this side of legal theory in order to understand the peculiarity of this sector. All the particular aspects of Islamic finance in all these sides (legal, accounting, financial) are based on the legal particularities of contracts in traditional Islamic law. This is why the dominant legal dimension of the book seems to us one of its major assets.

—

== Writing style ==
The language of the text is intended for the general public, including readers with no finance background.

Mohyedine HAJJAR wrote,

However, we note that much of the development in the book corresponds to the form of oral discourse. The text is loaded by remarkable stylistic gaps. We find quite a few poorly composed passages and the majority of the sentences are long and weakly organized. It is common to encounter sentences exceeding one third of a page. It is possible that this deficiency is at the origin of the chapters of this book, i.e. conference papers intended to be presented orally. In any case, this deficiency had to be remedied as the book's various editions progressed.

—

== Bibliography ==
In the official electronic version, the footnote numbering is continuous in each chapter and starts over in the following chapter. This indicates the bibliographical independence between chapters of the book.

Mohyedine HAJJAR wrote,

In our opinion, it was more judicious to opt for a continuous enumeration for the whole document or an enumeration that starts again with each new page. We also note that a bibliographical list is missing which lists down all the references mentioned by the author in his work. This is an important formal gap.

—

== Reception ==
Mohyedine HAJJAR wrote,

An Introduction to Islamic Finance is a great classic an introductory work to Islamic finance that we believe is indispensable for those wishing to learn about Islamic finance. The work is of high quality and has manystrengths.

—

== See also ==
- Taqi Usmani bibliography
