= Tauzeeh Al-Qur'an =

Quran translation by Taqi Usmani

- Author: Taqi Usmani
- Original title: توضیح القرآن
- Language: Urdu
- Subject: Tafsir
- Genre: Religious
- Publication date: 2009
- Publication place: Pakistan
- Pages: 1975 pages

Tauzeeh Al-Qur'an Asan Tarjuma Quran (Urdu: توضیح القرآن آسان ترجمہ قرآن) is a three-volume tafsir (exegesis) of the Quran written by Pakistani Islamic scholar Taqi Usmani (born 1943). The book was originally written in Urdu and has been translated into at least two languages, Bengali and Hindi.

== Background ==
Citing the reason for writing the book, the author says,

From today until a few years ago, I had the idea that since there are many translated books by reliable scholars in Urdu, there is no need for a new translation now. So when someone applied to me for another translation, despite considering the service of the Majid as a matter of great fortune, the realization of his own incompetence would be an obstacle in the first place, and the need for a new translation would not be felt in the second place. But later on, my friends from different parts of the world expressed their views that the translations of the Qur'an in Urdu, which are now in the hands of the people, have become difficult for the Muslim masses today. Therefore, even a very ordinary educated person will understand that such a simple translation is really necessary. Their demand grew so much that I had to rethink the issue. So I continued to monitor the current conventions as usual. In the end, it seemed to me that their appeal was important. Then when my English translation was finished and published as usual, their demands became even stronger. Eventually I started translating in the name of Allah Ta'ala. I thought that in order for ordinary Muslims to understand the meaning of the Qur'an, they would need a translation as well as a brief explanation. According to him, I have been careful to write a short explanatory note along with the translation.

== Features ==
This translation is not entirely literal, nor is it so independent that it deviates from the Qur'an vocabulary. Every effort has been made to keep the translation close to the wording of the Qur'an, with a focus on simplicity and clarity. Where there is more than one Tafsir space in the word, the space is also included in the translation. And where this has not been possible, the interpretation of the Salaf, that is, the predecessors, has been translated according to what the author thinks is most correct. The explanatory notes only point out that if the reader encounters a problem in understanding the meaning of the verse while reading the translation, he can resolve it with the help of annotations. Long explanatory analysis and theoretical discussions have not been introduced. Attempts have also been made to cover the short notes.

== Structure ==
At the beginning of the main text, the author writes a brief introduction to the text. Then a discussion entitled "Revelation and Why?" Topics covered include: Requirement of Revelation, Method of Revelation, Date of Revelation, First Verse, Meccan and Madani Verses, Periodic Descent, Shaan e Nuzul, History of Preservation of Quran, Manzil, Para, Ruku, Waqf, the science of Tafsir and common misconceptions about it, etc. At the beginning of each Surah there is some relevant discussion about the Surah under the heading "Introduction". Then the author gradually translated the verses of the Qur'an first. Then a brief explanation of the translated verse is attached, Surahs discussed in sections:

- Volume 1 - From Surah Al-Fatihah to Surah At-Tawbah
- Volume 2 - From Surah Al-Yunus to Surah Al-Ankabut
- Volume 3 - From Surah Ar-Rum to Surah Al-Nas

== Translation ==
The book has been translated into at least two languages, Bengali and Hindi. It was translated into Bengali by Abul Bashar Muhammad Saiful Islam in 2010 and published by Maktabatul Ashraf.

== See also ==
- Taqi Usmani bibliography
- List of tafsir works
- List of Sunni books

== Bibliography ==
- Ahmad, Zaheer (2021). The Comparative Study of Selected Urdu Translations of The Holy Quran (in Urdu). Allama Iqbal Open University, Islamabad. pp. 103–108.
- Nawi, Jaharuddin; Md. Marzuki, Junaidah (2016). "The Contributions of Mufti Muhammad Taqi Usmani and His Scholars in the Study of the Qur'an". Al-Irshad: Journal of Islam and Contemporary Affairs (in English). 2 (1): 1818.
