= Abdul Hai Arifi =

Pakistani Islamic scholar (1898–1986)

2nd President of Darul Uloom Karachi
- In office 1976 – 27 March 1986
- Preceded by: Muhammad Shafi
- Succeeded by: Rafi Usmani

Personal life
- Born: 1898
- Died: 27 March 1986 (aged 87–88)
- Resting place: Graveyard of Darul Uloom Karachi
- Education: Muhammadan Anglo-Oriental College, University of Lucknow

Religious life
- Religion: Islam

Muslim leader
- Disciple of: Ashraf Ali Thanwi
- Disciples: Taqi Usmani, Rafi Usmani

Abdul Hai Arifi (1898 – 27 March 1986) was a Pakistani Muslim scholar and a Sufi mentor of the Chishti order. He was a disciple of Ashraf Ali Thanwi. He authored books including Uswah Rasool-e-Akram and Death and Inheritance. He served as the president of Darul Uloom Karachi for ten years.

Arifi was an alumnus of Muhammadan Anglo-Oriental College and the University of Lucknow. He practiced law between 1926 and 1935, and homeopathy from 1936 until he died on 27 March 1986. His students in Sufism include Taqi Usmani and Rafi Usmani.

== Biography ==
Abdul Hai Arifi was born in 1898 in United Provinces of British India. He graduated from Muhammadan Anglo-Oriental College in 1923 and got an LLB degree from the University of Lucknow. He practiced law between 1926 and 1935. He left the field of law and studied Homeopathy in 1936. He practiced homeopathic medicine until his death. He had been in touch with Ashraf Ali Thanwi from 1923, and became his "murid" in 1927. Thanwi authorized him in the Chishti order in 1935.

Arifi was a member of the executive council of Darul Uloom Karachi and succeeded Muhammad Shafi as the president of Darul Uloom Karachi and served the seminary for about ten years until his death. He died on 27 March 1986. His funeral prayer was led by Taqi Usmani and attended by Muhammad Zia-ul-Haq and Jahan Dad Khan. He was buried in the graveyard of Darul Uloom Karachi. His disciples include Muhammad Taqi Usmani and Rafi Usmani.

== Literary works ==
Arifi authored books including:

- Uswah Rasool-e-Akram
- Death and Inheritance
- Ashraf Ali Thanvi, life & works
- The Islamic way in death: an authentic and comprehensive handbook of rules, and conduct in the event of death among Muslim
- Maʼās̲ir-i Ḥakīmulummat : irshādāt va ifādāt
- K̲h̲avātīn ke sharʻī aḥkām
- Fihrist-i taʼlīfāt-i Ḥakīmulummat
- Bahādur Yār Jang Akādmī kā taʻāruf

== Legacy ==
Rafi Usmani wrote Mere murshid Ḥaẓrat-i ʻĀrifī and Sayyid Riyazuddin wrote Ārif Billāh Ḥaz̤rat Ḍākṭar Muḥammad ʻAbdulhaʼī: savāniḥ ḥayāt va taʻlīmāt.

== See also ==
- List of Deobandis
