= Aziz al-Azmeh =

Syrian historian and scholar of Islam

Aziz Al-Azmeh
- عزيز العظمة
- Born: July 24, 1947 (age 79); Damascus, Syria
- Occupations: Academic, author, educator
- Awards: 1993: The Republican Order of Merit

Academic work
- Main interests: Islamic culture, Islamic history
- Notable works: Islams and Modernities

Aziz Al-Azmeh (Arabic: عزيز العظمة; born July 24, 1947) is a Syrian academic and Professor Emeritus at the Department of History, Central European University, Vienna, Austria. Among other books and papers, he published Islams and Modernities. In May 1993, he received the Republican Order of Merit, for services to Arab culture, from former President of Tunisia, Zine El Abidine Ben Ali.

== Early life and education ==
Aziz Al-Azmeh was born on July 24, 1947, in Damascus, Syria. He received a D.Phil. in Oriental Studies from St Antony's College, Oxford (supervised by Albert Hourani), having previously attended the University of Tübingen, and the University of Pennsylvania.

== Career ==
He has taught undergraduate and postgraduate courses (though latterly focusing on postgraduate teaching and research) across the whole thematic range of Arab and Islamic historical studies, medieval and modern, at the Central European University, the American University of Beirut, Yale University, Columbia University, the University of Exeter, Cornell University, the University of Oxford, the University of California, Berkeley (where he was the Sultan Visiting Professor), Georgetown University, and more recently at the Institute for the Study of Muslim Civilisations of the Aga Khan University. In the Fall of 1998, Aziz Al-Azmeh was a Residential Fellow at the Swedish Collegium for Advanced Study in Uppsala, Sweden.

He has served on the editorial boards of several academic journals, including the Medieval History Journal and the Journal of Arabic and Islamic Studies. In addition, Al-Azmeh has been invited to various international conferences, talks, seminars, lectures and symposia.

His book Islams and Modernities was released on October 17, 1996. The book explores the history of interaction between Islam and Europe, analyzing myths about those interactions created by Orientalist and Islamist viewpoints. A new version was released on August 7, 2009, also examining "the discourse surrounding Islamism and irrationalism after 9/11." The Guardian wrote that "Islams and Modernities raises urgent questions that are central to the concerns of the contemporary world.” New Statesman wrote that “Aziz Al-Azmeh is perhaps the most original thinker on these themes in Britain today."

In 2002 he became a professor at the Central European University in Budapest. In 2010, he was then a visiting research fellow at the university in the School of History and Interdisciplinary Historical Studies.

== Awards and honors ==
- 1993: The Republican Order of Merit, for services to Arab culture, was conferred by the former President of Tunisia, Zine El Abidine Ben Ali in May.
- 2005: An international conference was held at the Central European University, Budapest, to mark the tenth anniversary of the publication of book Islams and Modernities. The proceedings, papers delivered and transcript of discussions, are in preparation for publication.

== Bibliography ==
- Arabic Thought and Islamic Societies (1986)
- Ibn Khaldun: An Essay in Reinterpretation (1990)
- Islams and Modernities (1993, second edition: 1996, third edition: 2009)
- Muslim Kingship: Power and the Sacred in Muslim, Christian and Pagan Polities (1997)
- The Times of History: Universal Topics in Islamic Historiography (2007)
- The Emergence of Islam in Late Antiquity: Allah and His People (2014)

== See also ==
- History of Islam
