= Islams and Modernities =

Book by Aziz al-Azmeh

- Author: Aziz al-Azmeh
- Language: English
- Subject: Politics, Religion
- Genre: Nonfiction
- Publisher: Verso Books
- Publication date: 1993 (1st edition)
- Media type: Print (Hardcover, Paperback)
- Pages: 206 pp
- ISBN: 9780860916260

Islams and Modernities is a book by Aziz Al-Azmeh, a professor at Central European University. It was first released in 1993. The book explores the history of interaction between Islam and Europe, analyzing myths about those interactions created by Orientalist and Islamist viewpoints. A new version was released on August 7, 2009, also examining "the discourse surrounding Islamism and irrationalism after 9/11."

== Overview ==
The book brings together a collection of articles and papers written by Aziz al-Azmeh during the late 1980s and early 1990s. It critiques essentialist interpretations that portray Islam and modernity as inherently incompatible. Al-Azmeh argues that Islam is not a single, fixed entity but a diverse body of historical and social experiences, and that modernity is not an exclusively Western phenomenon. The book examines the relationship between religious discourse and political authority, as well as the roles of Orientalism and Islamism in shaping stereotypical representations of Islam. It advocates a critical historical approach that moves beyond conventional generalizations. In addition, the work addresses major themes in Islamic studies—including revelation, hadith, women, Sufism, and the Greek intellectual heritage—by reframing the questions through which these subjects are approached rather than offering simple or definitive answers

== Reception ==
The Guardian wrote that "Islams and Modernities raises urgent questions that are central to the concerns of the contemporary world.” New Statesman wrote that “Aziz Al-Azmeh is perhaps the most original thinker on these themes in Britain today."

Antony T. Sullivan, a researcher at the Center for Middle Eastern and North African Studies at the University of Michigan, Ann Arbor, argues that the book's significance lies in its encouragement of critical thinking and its contribution to the development of Islamic studies within contemporary academic frameworks. Sullivan also notes that Al-Azmeh's English-language writing made his ideas accessible to a broader international audience, thereby enriching scholarly debates on Islam and modernity.

== Versions ==
- First edition: Al-Azmeh, Aziz (1993), Islams and Modernities, Verso Books, ISBN 9780860916260
- Second edition: Al-Azmeh, Aziz (October 17, 1996), Islams and Modernities, Verso Books, ISBN 9781859841068
- 2009 edition: Al-Azmeh, Aziz (August 7, 2009), Islams and Modernities, Verso Books, ISBN 9781844673858 (includes a preface and two additional chapters)

== See also ==
- 1996 in literature
- Islamic literature
