= Pakistan Institute of Management =

- Abbreviation: PIM
- Formation: 1954
- Founder: Government of Pakistan
- Founded at: Karachi, Sindh, Pakistan
- Type: Management training and development organization
- Purpose: To promote management development in Pakistan
- Headquarters: Management House, Shahra-e-Iran, Clifton Block 5, Karachi, Sindh
- Location: Karachi, Sindh, Pakistan

The Pakistan Institute of Management (PIM) is a management training and development institute established in 1954 by the government of Pakistan. The institute is located in Karachi and offers a variety of training programs, professional diplomas, and certification courses for professionals in all areas of management.

== Recent developments ==
In January 2023, Tasneem Ahmed Qureshi, who occupied the role of Special Assistant to the Prime Minister on Industries and Production, pledged full support for the progress of PIM. He highlighted the importance of training and the development of human resources as a crucial component for any organization, whether public or private. He expressed his contentment with PIM's performance and commended the institute's accomplishments.

=== Privatization ===
In November 2023, the interim government tasked PIM with the job of reassessing the primary and secondary assets of Pakistan Steel Mills (PSM), including its legal, financial, and human resource obligations. This action was perceived as a part of the government's initiatives towards privatization.

== Collaboration ==
PIM has entered into a Memorandum of Understanding (MoU) with the Virtual University of Pakistan. This agreement is aimed at fostering collaboration between the two institutions for capacity enhancement and training initiatives. The MoU was formalized by Naveed A Malik, the Rector of the Virtual University of Pakistan, and Muhammad Abid Hussain, the Director of PIM.
