= Darul Uloom Karachi =

Islamic Seminary in Karachi, Sindh, Pakistan

Jamia Darul Uloom Karachi
- جامعہ دارالعلوم کراچی
- Type: Darul uloom
- Established: 1951 (1370 AH)
- Affiliations: Wifaq ul Madaris Al-Arabia, Pakistan
- President: Taqi Usmani
- Academic staff: 210
- Students: 10,000
- Location: Korangi, Karachi, Sindh, Pakistan; 24°50′44.74″N 67°9′55.17″E
- Campus: 56 acres (23 ha); Urban
- Website: darululoomkarachi.edu.pk

Darul Uloom Karachi (Urdu: دارالعلوم کراچی) is a Madrasa in Karachi, Pakistan. It was founded by Muhammad Shafi in June 1951 at Nanak Wara and later shifted to Korangi, Karachi, on 17 March 1957.

It continues the tradition of the Darul uloom system initiated by Darul Uloom Deoband. The institution has adopted a balanced approach towards religious and worldly matters in the education it imparts.

The current president of seminary is Taqi Usmani.

The secondary school has separate faculties for both boys and girls. The school has the highest standards of Islamic education and offers a combined curriculum covering traditional Islamic studies and contemporary academic subjects. It is registered as one of the Islamic Schools under Wifaq ul Madaris Al-Arabia.

== Background ==
After the establishment of Pakistan, the Ulama belonging to Deoband School of thought consider it better to introduce a system of education on the basis of Quran and Sunnah. The Madrassa Darul Uloom Karachi has been established keeping in view the rules and regulations and teaching methods of Darul Uloom Deoband. This institution introduced the learning process according to the teachings of Quran and Sunnah and pro-launched Islamic knowledge of Science. Ulama of Deoband had not accepted the teaching methods and learning process of Western world. The Ulama of this institution had started the teaching parallel to the Western Teachings. The Darul Uloom Karachi also adopted the same way of teaching and learning, according to the methodology of Deoband. In short Darul Uloom Karachi is the religious Madrasa working on the footsteps of Deoband Ulama. Gradually, Darul Uloom Karachi have been introduced the worldly knowledge with the passage and requirement of need of the time. Anyhow, according to the booklet titled: Introducing Darul Uloom Karachi is given as under: This would have been a system which aimed at providing the education of Quran and Sunnah in all its perfection, as well as an equally perfect education and training of modern sciences and arts without any anti-religious content or prejudice. Had this been accomplished, the ill-fated gulf between secular and religious education which stood as bridged at the very outset. At that stage, it was clear that the model of the Darul Uloom established under duress at Deoband in India during the secular, even anti-religious, period of British rule was not sufficient, and there was no room for the subordinated education of Aligarh. The educational approach of the Nadwa was not enough where only history and literature were singled out to be the core and pivot of Islamic studies, at the cost of the rest of Islamic sciences. What the country was needed at that time, an all-embracing system of standard education and training, in all its perfection, featuring the two kinds of education, the religious and the worldly, at one platform under one roof. The programme of this institution is given as under: It is often felt that the education in schools and colleges is still working on the trail left by the British masters, and these institutions are simply producing clerks instead of experts in the sciences and arts. Due to this fact our present society is facing an ever-declining state of affairs. So for as the purposeful and standard religious education and its grooming is concerned, neither allowed nor introduced properly. It is a universal fact that "knowledge, Islamic knowledge in particular, goes hand in hand with the following of Sunnah and the spirit of the great forebears of Islam. Unless one is trained and groomed to imbibe in personality, their ways and temperaments, no matter how high one has reached in worldly knowledge, intellect and research, one carries no weight in Islam."

== Establishment ==
According to its booklet, Introducing Darul Uloom Karachi, this institution was founded by Mufti Muhammad Shafi keeping in view the two objectives, the sole purpose of his life: "The first was to struggle for the implementation of the Shariah of Islam in Pakistan while the second objective was to establish a Darul Uloom at Karachi which was to be a befitting institution of higher Islamic learning in a metropolis. The first two years were consumed in formulating the Objectives Resolution that now forms part of the Constitution of Pakistan and in striving for an Islamic constitution of the state. The struggle was lace with grave handicaps and the integral support needed in the effort was meager. But, the aim was so important that he remained preoccupied with it in a degree that nothing effective could be done to establish the projected Darul Uloom." At the time of the establishment of Pakistan, Karachi had two distinctions, on the one hand it was the capital of Pakistan and the city of millions of Muslims, but on the other hand it had no central institution which could take care of the religious needs of its enormous population. It was felt necessary to establish such an institution that could serve the religious requirements of the people at large. For this reason, in June 1951 Mufti Muhammad Shafi, established an Islamic Madrasa in old school building located at Nanak Wara. At the beginning he had only two teachers and a few students in this Madrasa. Anyhow, with the passage of time the students started arriving in from all over the provinces of Pakistan. In addition to that, students from India, Burma, Indonesia, Malaysia, Afghanistan, Iran, Turkey and other Islamic countries also started coming in this learning institution. From start, it was within a very short span of time that Darul Uloom Karachi has been turned into a fortified fortress of Faith in the Muslim world. It became the home of the seekers of the knowledge, bequeathed by the Muhammad, a virtual pivot for those who would carry the call of Islam universally. Such was the rush of students that the fairly large school building became too small. A 56 acaras plot of land located in Korangi, along with a two-storied building, cemented well and a diesel engine was donated to Darul Uloom by Ibrahim Dadabhoy of South Africa. On this donated property, another concerned Muslim: Abdul-Latif Bawany spent a sum of one hundred thousand rupees personally and on behalf of his family as well as fifty eight thousand rupees collected from his friends. This helped to raise the necessary structures for the institution. According to 17 March 1957, this institution has been shifted to Korangi and in the old building there were departments of Hifz, Nazirah, Tajveed and Qiraat. At present Darul Uloom Karachi is a centre of learning and training in religious sciences. It had produced thousands of scholars, Hadith masters, Quran commentators, jurists, writers, judges and Fatwa authorities who have been serving in the way of Islam and carrying the message of Islamic ideology.

== Administration ==
Mufti Muhammad Shafi Deobandi, the seminary's founder was its first president and served until his death on 6 October 1976. He was succeeded by Dr Abdul Hai Arifi, who retained the role for ten years from 1976 to 1986. Mufti Rafi Usmani was the third president of the seminary and served until his death on 18 November 2022. The current president of Darul Uloom Karachi is Mufti Taqi Usmani.

== Departments ==
The madrasa has the following departments:

- Nazirah-e-Quran (reading the Quran)
- Tahfeez-ul-Quran (memorizing the Noble Quran)
- Tajwid (Quranic Phonetics)
- Department of Islamic Economics
- Department of Islamic Law
- Department of Islamic Jurisprudence
- Department of Hadith
- Department of Tafsir
- Department of English Language
- Department of Politics
- Department of Arabic Language
- Department of Information Technology
- Department of Business Management (in collaboration with Pakistan Institute of Management)

== Alumni ==
Alumni include:

- Taqi Usmani
- Hafez Ahmadullah
- Abdul Haq Baloch
- Abdul Salam Hanafi
- Abdur Razzaq Iskander
- Muhammad ibn Adam Al-Kawthari
- Habibullah Mukhtar
- Syed Mukhtaruddin Shah
