= Rafi Usmani =

Pakistani mufti (1936–2022)

Grand Mufti Rafi Usmani
- محمد رفیع عثمانی

3rd President of Darul Uloom Karachi
- In office 1986 – 18 November 2022
- Preceded by: Abdul Hai Arifi
- Succeeded by: Taqi Usmani

Vice-president of Wifaq-ul-Madaris
- In office 5 October 2017 – 16 June 2021

Personal life
- Born: 21 July 1936 Deoband, United Provinces, British India
- Died: 18 November 2022 (aged 86) Karachi, Sindh, Pakistan
- Resting place: Darul Uloom Karachi cemetery
- Parent: Muhammad Shafi (father)
- Education: Darul Uloom Deoband; University of the Punjab; Darul Uloom Karachi
- Relations: Taqi Usmani (brother); Usmani family of Deoband

Religious life
- Religion: Islam
- Denomination: Sunni
- Jurisprudence: Hanafi
- Creed: Maturidi
- Movement: Deobandi

Rafi Usmani (Note: Urdu: محمد رفیع عثمانی, romanized: Muḥammad Rafīʿ Us̱mānī) (21 July 1936 – 18 November 2022) was a Pakistani Islamic scholar who served as the president of Darul Uloom Karachi. He was an alumnus of Darul Uloom Deoband, University of the Punjab and the Darul Uloom Karachi, and was the elder brother of Taqi Usmani.

He authored books including Ahkām-e-Zakāt, Al-Tālīqāt al-nāfi'ah alā fath al-mulhim, Islām mai aurat ki hukmrāni and Nawādir al-Fiqh. He was a syndicate member of the University of Karachi, vice-president and a member of the executive council of Wifaq-ul-Madaris.

== Background and early life ==
Muḥammad Rafi Usmani was born on 21 July 1936 into the Usmani family of Deoband, in British India, in a town called Deoband. He was named Muḥammad Rafī by Ashraf Ali Thanwi. Usmāni's father Muhammad Shafi was a Grand Mufti of Darul Uloom Deoband and one of the pioneer figures of Pakistan Movement. Islamic scholar Taqi Usmani is his younger brother.

=== Soviet–Afghan War ===
In the late 1980s, he participated in the Soviet–Afghan War by joining the group Harkat-ul-Jihad al-Islami (HUJI). From 1988 to 1991, he published his jihad memoirs in the Urdu monthly of Darul Uloom Karachi, Al-Balagh, as well in the Urdu daily Jang and the Urdu monthly al-Irshad belonging to HUJI. These jihad memoirs were later published into a book titled Ye Tere Pur-Asrār Bande (transl. These Incredible Servants of Yours).

== Education ==
Usmani memorized half of the Quran at Darul Uloom Deoband, and migrated to Pakistan on 1 May 1948. He completed memorizing the Quran at the Masjid Bab al-Islam in Aram Bagh, and recited the last lesson with the Palestinian Grand Mufti, Amin al-Husseini. He entered the Darul Uloom Karachi in 1951, and graduated in the traditional "dars-e-nizami" in 1960. In 1378 AH, he passed the "molvi" and "munshi" (also known as "Molvi Fazil") examinations from University of the Punjab. He specialized in Islamic jurisprudence (ifta) at Darul Uloom Karachi in 1960.

Usmani studied Sahih Bukhari with Rashid Ahmed Ludhianvi, Sahih Muslim with Akbar Ali Saharanpuri, Muwatta Imam Muhammad and Sunan Nasai with Sahban Mehmood, Sunan Abu Dawood with Ri'ā'yatullah and Jami' al-Tirmidhi with Saleemullah Khan. He studied parts of Sunan ibn Majah with Muhammad Haqīq, and completed studying it under the tutelage of Ri'ā'yatullah. He was authorized to transmit hadith by Hasan bin Muhammad al-Musyath, Muhammad Idris Kandhlawi, Muhammad Shafi Deobandi, Muhammad Tayyib Qasmi, Zakariyya Kandhlawi and Zafar Ahmad Usmani.

== Career ==
Usmani was a member of All Pakistan Ulema Council, Council of Islamic Ideology, Ruet-e-Hilal Committee and Zakat Council of the Government of Sindh. He was an advisor to Shariat Appellate Bench, Supreme Court of Pakistan and a syndicate member of the NED University of Engineering & Technology and the University of Karachi. He served as a member of the examinations committee and the executive council of Wifaq-ul-Madaris, and subsequently became its patron. He served as the vice-president of Wifaq-ul-Madaris between 5 October 2017 and 16 June 2021. After the death of Abdul Hai Arifi in 1986, Usmani succeeded him and became the third president of Darul Uloom Karachi.

At Darul Uloom Karachi, Usmani taught all the books related to dars-e-nizami from 1380 AH to 1390 AH (the 1960s). From 1391 AH (1971) onwards, he taught the sciences of hadith and ifta in the seminary. He gave lectures on Sahih Muslim and trained the students of Islamic jurisprudence. His students included Muhammad ibn Adam Al-Kawthari.

He always asked students to keep a distance from politics.

== Literary works ==
Usmani authored about 27 books in Arabic and Urdu.

His Urdu translation and commentary of Inayat Ahmad's Ilm al-Sīgha is taught in the traditional dars-e-nizami curriculum in many madrasas of India, Pakistan, Bangladesh, England, South Africa and United States of America.

His other books include:

- Ahkām-e-Zakāt (transl. Rulings Pertaining to Zakat)
- Alāmāt-i qiyāmat aur nuzūl-i Masīḥ (transl. Signs of the End Times and the Descent of the Masih)
- Al-Tālīqāt al-nāfi'ah alā fath al-mulhim
- Bai al-wafā
- Europe ke tīn mu'āshi nizām, jāgīrdāri, sarmāyadāri, ishtirākiyat awr unka tārikhi pas-e-manzar. Its English translation is published separately as The three systems of economics in Europe: feudalism, capitalism, socialism and their historical background.
- Islām mai aurat ki hukmrāni (transl. Female leadership in Islam)
- Ḥayāt-i Muftī-yi Aʻẓam (transl. Life of the Grand Mufti), a biography of Muhammad Shafi Deobandi.
- Kitābat-e-Hadees ahd-e-risālat o ahd-e-sahāba mai transl. The writing of hadith in the era of the Prophet and his companions)
- Mere murshid Ḥaẓrat-i ʻĀrifī (transl. My Mentor: Hazrat ʻĀrifī), on the life and works of Abdul Hai Aarifi.
- Nawādir al-Fiqh

== Recognition ==
Usmani was given the title of Mufti-e-Azam (Grand Mufti) through a consensus opinion for his scholarly contributions. According to Dawn, he was appointed Grand Mufti by scholars representing the Deobandi movement in 1995. He was seen as a learned scholar, jurist, muhaddith, researcher and author, an excellent administrator, and a successful teacher and lecturer.

== Death ==
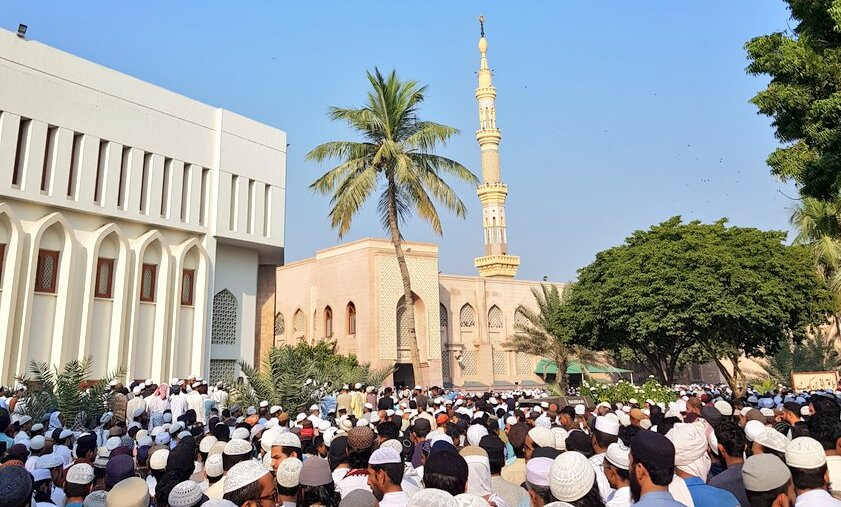
A view of Usmani's Janazah.

Usmani was suffering several health issues after surviving COVID-19 and was being treated for these complications. He died after a prolonged illness in Karachi on 18 November 2022, aged 86. Arif Alvi and Shehbaz Sharif expressed sorrow on his death. Marriyum Aurangzeb termed the scholar's death as an irreparable loss and the Governor of Sindh, Kamran Tessori, called it a loss to the whole of the Islamic world. Murad Ali Shah, while expressing sorrow, stated that, "Mufti Sahib's death is a great tragedy for the Islamic world. His religious services are eternal". Nawaz Sharif expressed that, "My heart is deeply saddened by the death of Mufti Rafi Usmani." His student Muhammad ibn Adam Al-Kawthari expressed that he had no words to express the sadness. Former Prime Minister of Pakistan, Imran Khan, also offered condolences and stated that he will be remembered for his invaluable scholarship.

Usmani's funeral prayers were led by his brother Muhammad Taqi Usmani on 20 November 2022, and attended by Anis Kaimkhani, Anwar-ul-Haq Haqqani, Fazal-ur-Rahman, Hafiz Naeem ur Rehman, Kamran Tessori, Muhammad Hanif Jalandhari and Syed Mustafa Kamal. He was buried near his father's grave in the cemetery of Darul Uloom Karachi.
