= Taqi Usmani =

Pakistani Islamic scholar and judge (born 1943)

Grand Mufti of Pakistan (Deobandi) Judge Mufti Muhammad Taqi Usmani SI, OI
- محمد تقی عثمانی
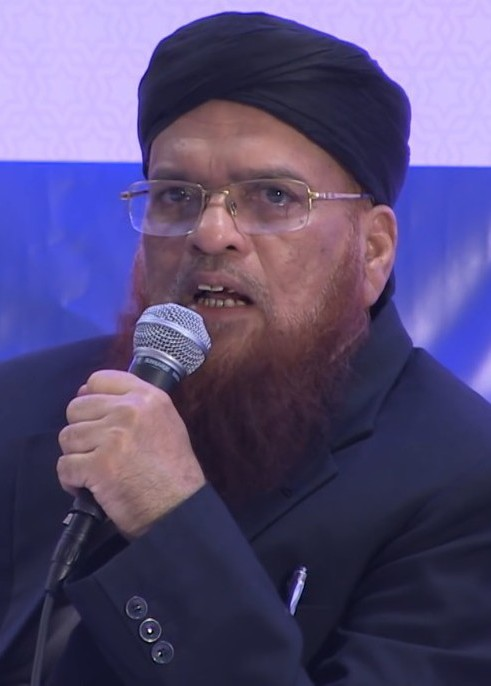
- Taqi Usmani in 2016 in London

Justice of the Shariat Appellate Bench of the Supreme Court of Pakistan
- In office 10 July 1982 – May 2002
- Appointed by: Muhammad Zia-ul-Haq

Justice of the Federal Shariat Court
- In office 6 July 1981 – 10 July 1982
- Appointed by: Muhammad Zia-ul-Haq

President of the Wifaq ul Madaris Al-Arabia, Pakistan
- Incumbent
- Assumed office 19 September 2021
- Preceded by: Abdur Razzaq Iskander

President of the Darul Uloom Karachi
- Incumbent
- Assumed office 2022
- Preceded by: Rafi Usmani

Personal details
- Born: 3 October 1943 (age 83) Deoband, United Provinces, British India
- Education: Darul Uloom Karachi; University of Karachi; University of the Punjab

Personal life
- Children: Imran Ashraf Usmani
- Parents: Shafi Usmani (father); Nafisa Khatun (mother)
- Main interest(s): Fiqh, Tafsir, Hadith, Islamic economics, Islamic Law, Islam and modernity, Political aspects of Islam, Comparative religion
- Notable works: Meezan Bank; Al-Balagh; Al-Balagh International
- Relatives: Rafi Usmani (Brother); Mahmood Ashraf Usmani (Nephew)
- Website: muftitaqiusmani.com

Religious life
- Religion: Islam
- Denomination: Sunni
- Jurisprudence: Hanafi
- Movement: Deobandi

Muslim leader
- Teacher: Shafi Usmani, Muhammad Idris Kandhlawi, Abd al-Fattah Abu Ghudda, Rashid Ahmed Ludhianvi, Wali Hasan Tonki, Zakariyya Kandhlawi, Saleemullah Khan
- Disciple of: Abdul Hai Arifi, Masihullah Khan
- Students: Muhammad Abdul Malek, Muhammad ibn Adam Al-Kawthari, Mizanur Rahman Sayed
- Influenced by: Ashraf Ali Thanwi
- Influenced: Deobandis
- Awards: Sitara-i-Imtiaz (2019); Order of Independence (Jordan) (2010); 1st, The 500 Most Influential Muslims (2020); Doctor of Letters, American International Theistic University (2022); Islamic Development Bank Award (2014); King Abdullah II Award (2011); Emir Muhammad bin Rashid Al Maktum Award (2004); More

Muhammad Taqi Usmani (born 5 October 1943) is a Pakistani Islamic scholar and former judge who is the current president of the Wifaq ul Madaris Al-Arabia and the vice president and Hadith professor of the Darul Uloom Karachi. An intellectual leader of the Deobandi movement, he has authored 143 books in Urdu, Arabic and English, including a translation of the Qur'an in both English and Urdu as well a 6-volume commentary on the Sahih Muslim in Arabic, Takmilat Fath al-Mulhim and Uloomu-l-Quran. He has written and lectured extensively on hadith, and Islamic finance. He chairs the Shariah Board of the Bahrain-based Accounting and Auditing Organization for Islamic Financial Institutions (AAOIFI). He is also a permanent member of the Jeddah-based International Islamic Fiqh Academy, an organ of the OIC.

In Pakistan, Usmani served as a scholar judge on the Shariat Appellate Bench of the Supreme Court from 1982 to 2002, and on the Federal Shariat Court from 1981 to 1982. From 1977 to 1981 he was a member of Zia's Council of Islamic Ideology and was involved in drafting the Hudood Ordinances.

== Early life and education ==
Muhammad Taqi Usmani was born on 5 Shawwal 1362 AH (3 October 1943) in the city of Deoband in Saharanpur district, United Provinces, British India. He was the fifth and youngest son of Mufti Muhammad Shafi (1897–1976). With his full nasab (patronymic), he is Muhammad Taqi ibn Muhammad Shafi ibn Muhammad Yasin ibn Khalifah Tahsin Ali ibn Imam Ali ibn Karim Allah ibn Khair Allah ibn Shukr Allah. The forefathers of Miyanji Shukr Allah are unknown, but the family claims descent from Uthman, the third caliph and a companion of the Islamic prophet Muhammad, hence the nisbat "Usmani".

Usmani was born to several generations of educators. The title "Miyanji" applied to several of his ancestors indicates that they were teachers. His grandfather Muhammad Yasin (1865/66 – 1936) taught Persian at Darul Uloom Deoband. Born the year before the madrasah's founding, he had been one of its first students and studied with some of its early teachers including Muhammad Yaqub Nanautawi, Sayyid Ahmad Dihlawi, Mulla Mahmud Deobandi, and Mahmud al-Hasan Deobandi. Usmani's father Muhammad Shafi was also a product of the Deoband seminary. He taught there for several decades and held the post of chief mufti.

In 1948, when Usmani was four years old, his father moved the family from Deoband to Karachi, Pakistan. Since there was not a madrasah nearby, Usmani's primary education began at home under his parents. He was later enrolled at Darul Uloom Karachi after Mufti Shafi founded the school in 1950. After completing his primary education, he began his formal religious training in the Dars-i Nizami curriculum in 1953. He passed the Fazil-i Arabi (Punjab Board) with distinction in 1958, and received his Alimiyyah degree with distinction from Darul Uloom Karachi in 1959. He then obtained his Takhassus (specialization) degree in fiqh (Islamic jurisprudence) and ifta (fatwa issuance) from Darul Uloom Karachi in 1961, earning the title of "Mufti". Usmani continued his education at the University of Karachi, obtaining a Bachelor of Arts in economics and politics in 1964, then a Bachelor of Laws standing second in his entire batch in 1967. In 1970 he obtained a Master of Arts with first-class honours in Arabic language and literature from the University of Punjab.

== Teachers ==
Usmani received teaching licenses to teach hadith from Islamic scholars including Muhammad Shafi, Muhammad Idris Kandhlawi, Qari Muhammad Tayyib, Saleemullah Khan, Rashid Ahmed Ludhianvi, Sahban Mahmud, Zafar Ahmad Usmani, Muhammad Zakariya Kandhalvi, Hasan al-Mahshat Al-Makki Al-Maliki, 'Abdu-l-'Azeez Ibn Baz Al-Maliki, Abd al-Fattah Abu Ghuddah, Abi Al-Faid Muhammad Yasin Al-Fadani Ash-Shafi'i, and others.

== Islamic Economics ==
Usmani pioneered the concept of Islamic banking in Pakistan when he established the Meezan Bank. Usmani has authored books in Arabic, Urdu, and English on Islamic topics in addition to articles on Islamic banking and finance published in journals and magazines.

According to The Muslim 500: "Usmani's chief influence comes from his position as a global authority on the issue of Islamic finance."

== Awards and honours ==
- 2022: The Royal Islamic Strategic Studies Centre ranks Usmani 6th in the 2023 edition of The 500 Most Influential Muslims.
- 2022: Honorary doctorate degree awarded in Islamic Law and Jurisprudence by American International Theism University
- 2019: Sitara-i Imtiaz (Star of Excellence) in the field of public service, conferred by the President of Pakistan
- 2019: The Royal Islamic Strategic Studies Centre ranks Usmani 1st in the 2020 edition of The 500 Most Influential Muslims. He has been included in the top 50 in every edition of the publication since its inception in 2009.
- 2017: The Global Islamic Finance Report ranks Usmani 2nd most influential person in the global Islamic financial services industry
- 2017: Lifetime Achievement Award, Islamic Finance Excellence Awards (IFEA), Center of Islamic Finance at COMSATS Institute of Information Technology, Lahore
- 2016: Lifetime Achievement Award, Islamic Finance Forum of South Asia (IFFSA)
- 2014: Islamic Development Bank (IDB) Prize in Islamic Banking and Finance
- 2011: King Abdullah II Award
- 2011: Lifetime Achievement Award, Islamic Business & Finance Magazine
- 2010: Wisam al-Istiqlal (Order of Independence), 1st class, conferred by the King of Jordan
- 2004: Emir Muhammad bin Rashid Al Maktum Award

== Academia ==
He is currently the Shakih-ul-Hadees in Dar-ul-Uloom Karachi and teaches Sahih al-Bukhari, fiqh, and Islamic economics at Darul Uloom Karachi and is known for his Islahi Khutbat. During the presidency of General Zia ul Haq, he was instrumental in drafting laws pertaining to Hudood, Qisas meaning retaliation in kind or an eye for an eye and Diyya (blood money).

== Personal views ==
Usmani strongly opposes elements of explicit modernity, which he describes as engulfing

"the whole world in the tornado of nudity and obscenity, and has provided an excuse for fornication, and more so it has led under thunder claps to the passage of a bill in the British House of Commons to legalize homosexuality. It is in the shadow of the same modernity that Western women are openly displaying banners on the streets demanding legalization of abortion"

At a religious conference in 1984, he urged a more "dynamic attitude" towards the practice of ijtihad, arguing there is no shortage of fine minds capable of interpreting the sharia, but warning against the contamination of sharia by Western ideas such as the elimination of hudud penalties such as amputation and stoning.

== Positions held ==
Positions held by Muhammad Taqi Usmani
Position	Organisation	Location	From
President	Wifaq ul Madaris	Multan	2021
President	Ittehad-e-Tanzeemat-Madaris Pakistan		2021
President and Shaykh al-Hadith	Jamia Darul Uloom Karachi	Karachi	
Chairman	International Shariah Standard Council, Accounting and Auditing Organization for Islamic Financial Institutions		
Member	International Islamic Fiqh Academy, Jeddah, organ of the Organisation of Islamic Conference	Jeddah	
Chairman Shariah Board	Meezan Bank Limited	Karachi	
Chairman Shariah Board	International Islamic Rating Agency	Bahrain	
Chairman Shariah Board	Arif Habib Investments – Pakistan International Islamic Fund	Karachi	
Chairman Board	American International Theism University	USA	

=== Positions held in the past ===
Positions held by Taqi Usmani in the past
Position	Organisation	From	to
Member	Council of Islamic Ideology	1977	1981
Judge	Federal Shariat Court of Pakistan	1980	1982
Judge	Shariat Appellate Bench, Supreme Court of Pakistan	1982	2002
Member	Syndicate University of Karachi	1985	1988

== Bibliography ==
Usmani has authored 143 books including Tauzeeh Al-Qur'an, An Introduction to Islamic Finance, Contemporary Fataawa, The Authority of Sunnah, Uloomu-l-Qur'an. He has also written a supplement to Shabbir Ahmad Usmani's Fath al-Mulhim, entitled Takmila Fath al-Mulhim.

== See also ==
- Contemporary Islamic philosophy

== Bibliography ==
- Asaad, Muhammad (2022). "ترجْة الشيخ محمد تقي العثمانّ وبيان جهوده فِ مجال السنة النبوية". International Prophetic Conference (SWAN) FPQS USIM.
- Basyariah, Nuhbatul (2015). "Telaah Kritis Implementasi Akad Musyarakah pada Bank Muamalat Indonesia Cabang Yogyakarta Perspektif Fikih Syekh Taqi Usmani". At-Tauzi: Islamic Economic Journal (in Indonesian). 13 (2): 67–80. ISSN 2715-9043.
- مرزوقي, زنيدة بنت محمد; المناس, سيوطي عبد; الخيرآبادي, محمد أبو الليث (1 August 2017). ""رد الشبهات حول الربا عند الشيخ محمد تقي العثماني في كتابه "تكملة فتح الملهم بشرح صحيح الإمام مسلم (Refuting the Doubts on Riba by Shaykh Muhammad Taqi 'Uthmani in His Takmilah Fath al-Mulhim bi Sharh Sahih al-Imam Muslim)". Journal of Islam in Asia. 14 (1): 63–83. doi:10.31436/jia.v14i1.583. ISSN 2289-8077.
- الصديقي, يوسف عظيم; حسن, عزنان (17 September 2020). "منهج المفتي محمد تقي العثماني في استعراض النوازل المالية كتاب البيوع في "صحيح البخاري" نموذجاً (The Methodology of Muftī Muhammad Taqi Usmani in Presenting Unprecedented Financial Issues: Book of Sale of Ṣaḥīḥ al-Bukhārī as a Case Study )". Journal of Islam in Asia (in Arabic). 17 (2): 67–89. doi:10.31436/jia.v17i2.965. ISSN 2289-8077. S2CID 229024003.
- Bingöl, Abdurrahim. Muhammed Takî Osmânî ve fıkıhçılığı (Master thesis) (in Turkish). Diyarbakır: Dicle Üniversitesi, Sosyal Bilimler Enstitüsü. hdl:11468/4674.
- Karamustafaoğlu, Muhammed Hafız (31 December 2021). "Muhammed Takî Osmanî'nin Tekmiletü Fethi'l-Mülhim İsimli Eserinde Vakıf Konusu Bağlamında Hanefilere Dayandırılan Görüşlerin Mezhep ile Uyumu". İslam Medeniyeti Dergisi (in Turkish). 7 (48): 14–21. ISSN 2687-3672.
- Akay, İhsan (30 November 2016). "USÛLU'L-İFTÂ VE ÂDÂBUHU". Şarkiyat (in Turkish). 8 (2): 1006–1009.
- Şahi̇n, Ünal (31 December 2020). "Usûlü'l-İftâ ve Âdâbuhû, Muhammed Takî el-Osmânî". Mütefekkir (in Turkish). 7 (14): 635–640. doi:10.30523/mutefekkir.849997. ISSN 2148-5631. S2CID 234382777.
