= List of Pakistani Catholic priests =

This is a list of notable Roman Catholic priests, both living and dead, who are citizens or permanent residents of Pakistan.

== List of Pakistani priests ==
=== A ===
- Rufin Anthony †

=== C ===
- Joseph Cordeiro †
- Joseph Coutts

=== D ===
- Jimmy deSouza †
- Theophilus D'Souza †
- Melito Dias †

=== F ===
- Andrew Francis †

=== I ===
- George Ibrahim †

=== J ===
- Edward Joseph
- John Joseph †

=== L ===
- Anthony Theodore Lobo †

=== M ===
- Emmanuel Yousaf Mani
- Anthony Martis
- Iftikhar Moon

=== P ===
- Inayat Patras
- Bonaventure Patrick Paul OFM †
- Joseph Paul
- Simeon Anthony Pereira †
- Evarist Pinto

=== R ===
- Khalid Rashid
- Indrias Rehmat
- Max John Rodrigues

=== S ===
- Lawrence Saldanha
- Sebastian Francis Shah OFM
- Younan Shahzad

=== T ===
- Benny Travas
- Armando Trindade †

=== V ===
- P A Varkey †

=== Y ===
- Patras Yusaf †
