= St. Lawrence's Church, Karachi =

St. Lawrence’s Churchs
- Location: Cincinnatus Town, Karachi
- Country: Pakistan
- Denomination: Roman Catholic

History
- Founded: 1912
- Consecrated: 10 August 1931
- Events: Life-size statue of the patron saint ordered from Rome in 1930.

Architecture
- Architectural type: Constructed with elements of Mughal architecture
- Groundbreaking: 1903
- Completed: 1929

Administration
- Archdiocese: Archdiocese of Karachi
- Parish: St. Lawrence’s Parish

St. Lawrence's Church, Karachi is part of the Roman Catholic Archdiocese of Karachi. It became a parish in 1912.

== History ==
It was the architects of Cincinnatus Town that first “gave priority to the building of a church which they dedicated to St. Lawrence”. A fund for the construction of St. Lawrence's Chapel was started by residents of the area in 1907. In a 1925 meeting of the contributors, an amount of Rs. 14,500 had been collected for purchasing suitable land in Cincinnatus Town.

== Design ==
The Church was constructed with elements of Mughal architecture in it. The church has been heritage-listed.

The exterior of the building has a dome and a minaret, with crosses atop each. The sanctuary is directly under the dome. Adjacent to the sanctuary is the vestry or sacristy. The main entrance faces west, and just above it is the choir loft. Two galleries run along the sides of the Church to accommodate the overflow of the faithful. High above each side of the sanctuary, are three stained glass windows, with the Star of David in the centre window.

Lawrence Cajetan Duarte donated the life-size statue of the patron saint which was ordered from Rome in 1930. The church was built by parishioners through personal contributions (1903–1929) and formally opened on August 10, 1931. The first High Mass was offered in 1929 without roof and doors and people brought their own stools and chairs. Twenty-nine men and sixteen women having dedicated their lives in the service of the Church, including one Cardinal, two archbishops and three bishops.

== Parish boundaries ==
The boundaries of St. Lawrence's Parish stretch from the Lyari River to the Teen Hutti bridge on Manghopir Road. From Teen Hutti the border continued to Bunder Road and extend to the Karachi Central Jail. On the south, the border ran along Bunder Road Extension past Cosmopolitan Colony and Catholic Colony No. 1 to the K.G.A Gymkhana. On the west the boundaries were Sindhi Muslim Colony, Vallabhai Patel Park, Soldier Bazaar, Punjab Colony and Gandhi Gardens. The borders of the Parish have changed several times as the city developed with parts being ceded to Christ the King Parish and St. Jude's Parish.

== Parish Priests ==
- Fr Priscus Nieuwenhuis O.F.M † 1931-1937
- Fr. Valens Wienk O.F.M † 1937-1940
- Fr. Vittorine Fernandes O.F.M † 1940-51
- Monsignor Athanasius Moniz † 1951-69
- Fr. Robert D'Silva † 1969- 74
- Fr. Luperc Mascarenhas † 1974–77.
- Fr. Arnold Heredia 1977–80.
- Fr. Melito Dias 1980- 87
- Fr Evarist Pinto 1987–1993.
- Fr. Anthony D'Cruz † 1997 - 2001
- Fr Robert D'Silva † 2004-2006
- Fr. Jimmy deSouza † October 2006 to June 2007.
- Fr Norbert Mendonca 2007 - 2015.
- Fr. Anthony Martis 2016-2020
- Fr. Edward Joseph 2020

== Parish schools ==
The parish opened the Infant Jesus School managed by the Daughters of the Cross, to serve the community. It had nursery and primary school classes. The Jufelhurst school, although privately owned, had classes up to the Matriculation and Senior Cambridge levels. At the primary level it had boys as well as girls.

The parish is also home to the St. Lawrence's Boys School. The school was founded in 1950 by Fr. Victorino Fernandes who was then the Parish Priest. The school began in the parlour of the Parish House.

The parish also houses the St. Lawrence's Girls School. The parish was also responsible for the St Lawrence's Girls College which was nationalised in 1972. In 2001 the Sindh Education Department announced that the old premises of the college would be handed back to the church.

In 1961 St. Mary's Urdu School was started in the parish. It initially had just the one nursery class and every year added a class until reaching the tenth grade.

== Recent events ==
The parish has produced more than 70 doctors, numerous educationists and entrepreneurs, and houses 11 Religious Orders, 5 Homes for the Aged and Orphans, and the only Dispensary for the poor in the archdiocese.

In 1995 the parish took the lead in promoting liturgical music when Sister Joyce Correa and parishioner David Braganza started organ classes in a modest way with a single electric organ and five pupils and now have 30 students. The success of the program has resulted in their music filling other parishes such as Saint Jude’s and Saint Patrick’s churches. St. Lawrence's parish is also home to a small community of Little Brothers of Jesus a Catholic religious order for men.

The Archbishop comes to St. Lawrence's every August 10 to celebrate the feast of the patron of the parish.

== Notable parishioners ==
- Cardinal Joseph Cordeiro† (ordained 1946), Archbishop of Karachi 1958–93.
- Angelo Fernandes became Archbishop of Delhi on 16 September 1967.
- William Gomes, Bishop of Poona 1967 – 1976 .
- Oswald Bruno Nazareth †, high school teacher for 50 years.
- Mervyn Cardoza †, Tamgha-e-Khidmat, Brigadier-general in the Pakistan Army.
- Simeon Anthony Pereira †, Archbishop of Karachi 1993-2006
- Bonaventure Patrick Paul †, Bishop of Hyderabad
- Louis Mascarenhas (ordained in 1958)
- Anthony Lobo †, Bishop of Islamabad-Rawalpindi
- Bernadette Louise Dean, former Principal of Kinnaird College and St. Joseph's College for Women.
- Joyann Thomas is a football (soccer) player on the National team
