= Catholic Church in Pakistan =

Religious group in Pakistan

The Catholic Church in Pakistan is part of the worldwide Catholic Church, under the spiritual leadership of the pope in Rome.

In 2018, there were 1,333,450 Catholics in Pakistan, which represents less than 1% of the total population. There are seven ecclesiastical units in Pakistan comprising two archdioceses, four dioceses, and one apostolic vicariate, all Latin Rite.

== History ==
There is anecdotal evidence that St. Thomas the Apostle passed through Taxila (in the Diocese of Islamabad-Rawalpindi) in his journey in India in the first century AD, where he is said to have established the community of Saint Thomas Christians on the Malabar Coast. A Saint Thomas Christian cross discovered in June 2020 made of marble and weighing more than three tons, about seven by six feet in size, was found in the mountains of Baltistan, in the northern areas of Pakistan. It is estimated to be more than 900 years old, possibly being the earliest physical evidence of a Christian presence in what is now Pakistan.

In 1745, the Bettiah Christian Mission, the northern Indian subcontinent's oldest surviving Christian community, was established by the Order of Friars Minor Capuchin under the patronage of King Dhurup Singh; the Hindustan Prefecture was raised in 1769 at Patna and later shifted to Agra, which was elevated to the status of a Vicariate in 1820. The Capuchins, through their Agra Diocese and Allahabad Diocese, established in the 1800s Catholic churches in colonial India's northern provinces including Rajasthan, UP, CP, Bihar and Punjab, the latter of which now includes Pakistan.

On 30 October 1945 in colonial India, the All India Conference of Indian Christians (AICIC) formed a joint committee with the Catholic Union of India to form a joint committee that passed a resolution in which, "in the future constitution of India, the profession, practice and propagation of religion should be guaranteed and that a change of religion should not involve any civil or political disability." This joint committee enabled the Christians in India to stand united, and in front of the British Parliamentary Delegation "the committee members unanimously supported the move for independence and expressed complete confidence in the future of the community in India." The office for this joint committee was opened in Delhi, in which the Vice-Chancellor of Andhra University M. Mariadas Ruthnaswamy served as president and B.L. Rallia Ram of Lahore served as General Secretary. Six members of the joint committee were elected to the Minorities Committee of the Constituent Assembly of India. In its meeting on 16 April 1947 and 17 April 1947, the joint committee of the All India Conference of Indian Christians and All India Catholic Union prepared a 13-point memorandum that was sent to the Constituent Assembly, which asked for religious freedom for both organisations and individuals.

Following the partition of India, the Catholic Union of India granted independence to its branches in Sind and Baluchistan in its Second Annual General Meeting in Bangalore in October 1947, which was presided by Ruthnasamy.

The Catholic Church in Pakistan is active in education managing leading schools like Saint Patrick's High School, Karachi, health and other social aspects of daily life in addition to its spiritual work. In 2008 the Catholic Church runs 534 schools, 53 hostels, 8 colleges, 7 technical institutes and 8 catechetical centers.

Joseph Cordeiro, Archbishop of Karachi, became the first Pakistani cardinal, elevated to the position by Pope Paul VI on 5 March 1973.

Pope John Paul II visited Pakistan on 16 February 1981.

Pope John Paul II received the President of Pakistan Pervez Musharraf in a private audience in the Vatican on 30 September 2004. In 2004 President Pervez Musharraf began hosting an annual Christmas dinner as an expression of seasonal goodwill.

For the first time in the country's history, Shahbaz Bhatti, a Catholic, became the federal minister for minorities in 2008. Bhatti was assassinated on 2 March 2011.

Pope Benedict XVI met the Catholic bishops of Pakistan on 19 June 2008. The bishops were in Rome for their ad limina visit.

On 20 May 2018, Pope Francis announced he would make Archbishop Joseph Coutts of Karachi a cardinal in the consistory scheduled for 29 June.

On 11 February 2021, Pope Francis accepted Coutts resignation and appointed Bishop Benny Mario Travas of Multan as the sixth Archbishop of Karachi.

== List of Catholic provinces and dioceses in Pakistan ==
=== Ecclesiastical Province of Lahore ===
- Archdiocese of Lahore
- Diocese of Faisalabad
- Diocese of Islamabad-Rawalpindi
- Diocese of Multan

=== Ecclesiastical Province of Karachi ===
- Archdiocese of Karachi
- Diocese of Hyderabad
- Apostolic Prefecture of Quetta

== Statistics ==
Arch/diocese/vicariate	Catholics	Priests
Karachi	186,600	31
Hyderabad	50,283	10
Quetta	32,632	8
Lahore	389,000	31
Multan	310,000	13
Faisalabad	182,662	35
Islamabad-Rawalpindi	214,976	32

Source: The Asian Catholic Church Directory

In 2020 the Church in Pakistan had grown to 173 diocesan priests and 134 priests who are members of religious orders.

== Persecution ==
The Catholic Church continues to be persecuted. As recently as April 2009 armed men attacked a group of Christians in Taiser Town, near Karachi. They set ablaze six Christian houses and injured three Christians, including an 11-year-old boy, who was in critical condition in the hospital.

The minorities in Swat Valley are fleeing the area as the Taliban have imposed a tax on non-Muslims, the Catholic Bishops' Conference president Archbishop Lawrence Saldanha has said, urging the Pakistani president and prime minister to intervene. The government has recently allowed the imposition of Sharia laws in parts of the North West Frontier Province much to the detriment of non-Muslims.

In 2009, Pakistan is the only country in the world with a "blasphemy law". The constitution also ensures that a non-Muslim cannot become president, prime minister, or any of the 11 senior most government positions in the country.

On 30 July 2009, tensions arose in the Christian village of Korian after pages containing Islamic inscriptions were found in front of a Christian home. Muslims then accused a family there of blasphemy against Islam. On 1 August 2009, a Muslim mob raided a Christian settlement in Gojra, vandalizing and looting houses and causing the deaths of eight people and injuries to many others. Fifty Christian homes were destroyed. Pope Benedict XVI expressed profound sorrow at anti-Christian riots in Pakistan and appealed to everyone to renounce violence and take up again the path of peace. He communicated this message in a telegram to Faisalabad Bishop Joseph Coutts.

St. Thomas' Church, Wah Cantt, was attacked by a group of armed men on 28 March 2011 which resulted in damages. It is believed that the incident was related to the recent episode of the burning of the Quran by Pastor Terry Jones in the U.S.

The situation in Pakistan deteriorated to such an extent that by 2013 large numbers of Christians started to seek asylum overseas.

== Recognition ==
Over the years a number of Catholics have been recognized by the Government of Pakistan for their contribution to education, community service, health and public service.

In 1965 Brig. Mervyn Cardoza was honored with the Tamgha-e-Khidmat by President Ayub Khan.

Group Captain Cecil Chaudhry was awarded Sitara-e-Jurat (1965) and Tamgha-i-Jurat (1971).

Justice Alvin Robert Cornelius, Chief Justice of the Supreme Court of Pakistan from 1960 to 1968, was the recipient of Hilal-i-Pakistan in 1967.

Hermanegild Marcos Antonio Drago was honoured first with Tamgha-e-Pakistan in 1967 and then with the Sitara-e-Imtiaz posthumously in 2002 for his services for the betterment of the community.

Sister Ruth Pfau was perhaps the most decorated Catholic having received:

- 1969: Sitara i Quaid i Azam
- Hilal-e-Imtiaz
- Hilal-i-Pakistan
- 2010 Nishan-i-Quaid-i-Azam for public service.
- Pfau was the first Christian and first non-Muslim to be given a state funeral in Pakistan.

Sister Gertrude Lemmens FMCK, in recognition of her work for the homeless, the needy and the handicapped, on 23 March 1989 received the Sitara-i-Quaid-i-Azam (Order of the Great Leader), one of the highest honors given to foreign nationals.

In 1999 Major General Julian Peter was the recipient of the Hilal-e-Imtiaz (Military).

Father Francis Nadeem OFM Cap. a parish priest and author from Lahore, was awarded the Tamgha-e-Imtiaz on Independence Day, 15 August 2000, for outstanding service to the country.

Sister Mary Emily FC, on 23 March 2009, was awarded the Sitara-e-Imtiaz which she received from the Governor of Sindh. This was in recognition of her services to education.

Sister John Berchmans Conway: on 15 February 2012, the President of Pakistan approved conferment of Sitara Quaid-e-Azam on Sister Berchmans for her services towards education and promoting interfaith harmony in Pakistan.

Father Robert McCulloch – On 15 February 2012, the President of Pakistan approved conferment of Sitara Quaid-e-Azam on McCulloch for his services to Pakistan in health and education.

Brother Emmanuel Nicholas – The President of Pakistan conferred the civil award of Tamgha-i-Pakistan (Medal of Pakistan) on Bro. Emmanuel Nicholas in recognition of his outstanding and meritorious services to the education sector in Pakistan.

Norma Fernandes – The Government of Pakistan honoured Mrs. Fernandes on 23 March 2014 with the Tamgha-i-Imtiaz for her services to education.

Pakistan Bible Society – In 2013 Pakistan Post issued a commemorative postage stamp on the 150th anniversary of the Pakistan Bible Society.

Sister Mary Langan RJM, an Irish nun working in Pakistan since 1983, in 2013 was awarded the Tamgha-e-Quaid-e-Azam by the Government of Pakistan for her services in the field of education.

On 13 June 2020, Bishop Benny Mario Travas inaugurated the St. Peter's CSS Academy in Multan. The Academy has been created to encourage and facilitate Catholics to appear for the Central Superior Services exams that lead to federal public service jobs. This is the first time a concerted effort has been made to promote Catholics into the public service.

On 14 August 2020, Sister Ruth Lewis was posthumously granted the civil award Sitara-i-Imtiaz for her Public Service. She worked at Darul Sukun for more than 50 years.

== History of Priestly Service ==
The Pakistani Catholic Church has a long tradition of service with many Priests who have completed 50 years or more of service in the priesthood:

- Father D’Arcy D'Souza † (1943–2009)
- Father Stephen Raymond † (1944–1999)
- Father Robert D'Silva † (1942–2015)
- Father Armando Trindade † (1950–2000)
- Father Simeon Anthony Pereira † (1951–2006)
- Father Francis de Souza † (1948–2014)
- Fr. Canisius Mascarenhas (1950– )
- Fr. Melito Dias (1954– )
- Father James "Jimmy" deSouza † (1952–2016)
- Father Bonaventure Patrick Paul OFM † (1954–2007)
- Fr. Ignatius Pinto † (1945–1996)
- Fr. Michael D’Cruz OFM (1957- )
- Fr. Louis Mascarenhas OFM (1958– )
- Father Anthony Mascarenhas
- Father Augustine Fernandes OFM †
- Father Lawrence Saldanha (1960– )
- Father John Baptist Todd OFM †
- Father Gasper Mendes OFM
- Father Anthony Theodore Lobo † (1961–2013)
- Father Joe D'Mello (1961– )
- Father Joseph Paul (1962– )
- Father Bonnie Mendes (1962– )
- Father Ken Viegas OFM (1964– )
- Father Arnold Heredia (1965– )
- Father Anthony Martis (1966– )
- Max John Rodrigues (1966– )
- Victor Gnanapragasam OMI † (1966–2020)
- Benjamin Joseph (1967– )
- Evarist Pinto (1968– )
- Augustine Soares† (1969–2019)
- Anjou Soares (1969– )
- Richard D'Souza (1970 – )
- Joseph Coutts (1971 - )

== Candidates to sainthood ==
- Akash Bashir, former student of the Don Bosco Technical Institute in Lahore, security guard and martyr. On 31 January 2022 Pope Francis declared him a Servant of God. He is the first native Pakistani candidate for sainthood in the history of the Catholic Church in Pakistan.

== See also ==
- Christianity in Pakistan
- A more detailed history of the Catholic Church in Pakistan
