= Monastery of the Angels =

Catholic monastery of Dominican nuns in Pakistan

Monastery information
- Order: Dominican
- Denomination: Catholic Church
- Established: December 1959
- Mother house: Monastery of the Angels
- Dedication: Our Lady of the Angels
- Archdiocese: Karachi

People
- Important associated figures: Joseph Cordeiro, James deSouza

Architecture
- Status: Monastery

Site
- Location: Landhi, Karachi
- Country: Pakistan
- Public access: Yes
- Other information: Earn their living making bread, cakes, sweets, hosts and wine

The Monastery of the Angels is the cloistered monastery of a Catholic religious community for women in Karachi, Pakistan. The community is made up of Dominican nuns. They dedicate their lives to constant prayer, with one of them always present in the chapel in perpetual adoration of the Blessed Sacrament. They receive many letters, telephone calls, faxes and e-mail with prayer requests.

== History ==
When Joseph Cordeiro became archbishop of Karachi in 1958, he invited a community of contemplative nuns to establish a community of their Order in the diocese. In December 1959, nine nuns from the monastery in Los Angeles arrived in Pakistan to found the monastery in Karachi. On July 20, 1968, the monastery was moved from Ingle Road to its current location in the Landhi area of Karachi.

James deSouza was the first chaplain of the monastery. Later, when he became the Rector of St. Pius X Minor Seminary, he used to send his young seminarians to help the nuns whenever they had some difficult work, like cleaning of the Retreat House, a special planting project in the garden, or other heavy jobs. The nuns in turn supplied them with homemade jam, bakery goods, and fruits and vegetables from their garden.

On December 20, 2009 the Monastery celebrated the 50th anniversary of its beginning in Pakistan. However, there had been no one joining their numbers in ten years. Evarist Pinto of Karachi, celebrated a special Mass at the monastery chapel, concelebrated with Max John Rodrigues of Hyderabad, Karachi Vicar General Arthur Charles, and 17 other priests.

In 2013 all the nuns were natives of Pakistan. In 2016, there were ten professed nuns and two second year novices in the community.

== Daily Life ==
The prioress of the community and her assistant read the newspapers to learn about the situation in the world. They then tell the other sisters about the important things happening outside the cloister.

The nuns are separated from the outside world by a grate. This divides them from the guests who visit them, from the priest who celebrates Mass for them, and even from the relatives who come to visit them on certain days.

Daily life in the monastery is similar to that in other cloisters throughout the world. The nuns typically make bread, cakes, sweets, hosts and wine for the parishes. These products are placed near a small turntable in the wall between the cloister and where people can come to pick them up.

== Their bread ==
The nuns earn a modest income by baking and selling bread. It was described by Salman Rushdi as “white, crusty and full of flavour”.
