= St Lawrence's Convent Girls' School =

Private missionary school in Karachi

Location
- Garden East, Jamshed Town; Karachi, Sindh; Pakistan; 24°52′50″N 67°01′58″E

Information
- Type: Private primary and secondary school
- Motto: The ship of our life sailing on stormy water led by a star
- Religious affiliation: Roman Catholic
- Established: 1936 (90 years ago)
- Founders: Franciscan Missionaries of Mary
- Sister school: St. Lawrence's Boys' School
- Authority: Board of Secondary Education, Karachi
- Oversight: Catholic Board of Education
- Principal: Sister Catherine Gill
- Gender: Girls
- Age: 4 to 16
- Enrollment: 1,100 (approximately)
- Houses: Unity, Discipline, Service, Faith
- Colours: Red, green, blue, yellow
- Nationalised: 1972
- De-nationalised: 1990

St Lawrence's Convent Girls' School is a private Catholic primary and secondary school for girls located in Karachi, Sindh, Pakistan. Founded by the Sister of the Franciscan Missionaries of Mary in 1936 as a co-educational school, the school is now part of the Archdiocese of Karachi.

== History ==
The school was founded in January 1936 by the Sisters of the Franciscan Missionaries of Mary with 115 male and female students. Mother Mary Britwald was its first principal.

The school is housed in a simple, austere building at the intersection of Britto and D'Souza roads in what used to be Cincinnatus Town, now Garden East. The convent was established in 1932 and the school in 1936. Over the years, numerous additions have been made to the original structure of the school.

In 1972, the school was nationalised by the then government, leading to the fear that the standards might drop. Mrs. Clarice Monteiro remained the principal until the school was denationalised in 1990.

In 2011, the institution provided education to around 1,100 girls.

The seal of the school represents "The ship of our life sailing on stormy water led by a star".

== Teaching staff ==
Mother Mary Britwald was its first principal. Some of the principals have been Sister Mary Duarte, Sister Esther Burns, Mrs. Christine Martins, Sister Joyce, Sister Bernadette Fernandes, Mrs. Rita D'Souza. and Clarissa D’Mello.

Three teachers reached different milestones of their careers were Angela Lucas, who completed 39 years of service having joined the school in 1971; Shugufta Qureshi completing 34 years and Saverine D'Costa with 34 years of service, respectively.

The principal of the school, Christine Martins (who herself has been an alumna of the school), has introduced many new initiatives in administrative matters, training of teachers, teaching standards and methodology, curriculum, concerts, plays and sports days. She is the youngest-ever principal of that school.

== Platinum jubilee ==
On 21 September 2011, students, teachers and staff of the school gathered to take part in its platinum jubilee celebrations. The celebrations started with a Mass at St Lawrence's Church. The chief guest, Sr Helen McAllister, along with Archbishop Evarist Pinto unveiled a plaque commemorating the 75 years of the school.

== Notable alumnae ==
- Shaila Abdullah, author and designer
- Professor Anita Ghulam Ali – former Minister for Education
- Bernadette Louise Dean – former principal, St. Joseph's College, Karachi
- Rennie M. D'Souza, Epidemiologist and academic, Australian National University
- Prof. Samina Khalil, Director, Applied Economics Research Centre
- Christine Martins – principal of the school (2006–2018)
- Mariyam Moosa Raza – professor of zoology, Saint Joseph's College and DJ Science College

== See also ==
- Catholic Church in Pakistan
- Education in Karachi
- List of schools in Karachi
