= St Paul's Parish, Azam Basti =

Part of Roman Catholic Archdiocese of Karachi

St Paul's Parish, Mehmoodabad Gate is part of the Roman Catholic Archdiocese of Karachi. The parish is also home to a Catholic school and a home for young orphan girls run by the religious order of the Daughters of the Cross.

The Parish Priest of St. Paul’s parish from 1993-1999 was Fr. Evarist Pinto who later became Archbishop of Karachi.

There were great festivities in the Catholic parish of St Paul in this small town on 25 January 2005, the feast of the Conversion of Saint Paul which was celebrated by Christians all over the world.

There was a solemn Mass and the recitation of the Rosary. The Mass was presided by Fr Diego Saleh, concelebrants included Fr Mario Rodriguez, and Fr. Joseph Paul. The liturgies were animated by parish groups of young people and children who sang the hymns and composed special prayers.

The screening of the first Pakistani Catholic film Muhjza [Miracle], took place at St. Paul's parish compound in April 2006. The project was realized by Fr Arthur Charles, a priest of Karachi Archdiocese, who also spoke of having a Catholic TV Channel and radio station in the future.

In 2009, Father Mario Rodrigues, who is also the National director of the Pontifical Mission Societies, was the parish priest.

The parish is proactive in other areas of social welfare as well. In 2009 it supported a fundraising campaign of the Pontifical Mission Societies for needy Christians displaced by the ongoing anti-Taliban military operation in North West Frontier Province.

== Mass centres ==
The Holy Rosary Church, Azam Town, is one of several Mass Centres in St. Paul’s Parish. On March 28, 2010 (Palm Sunday), the Parish Priest, Fr. Saleh Diego, who is also Chairperson of Caritas Pakistan Karachi, organized an Easter Food hamper program, among the widows and needy families of the parish.

A second Mass Centre in the parish is Saint Michael's Church in Manzoor Colony.

In July 2011, Archbishop Pinto attended the ground-breaking ceremony for the new St. John Marie Vianney Church in the Parish.

On 9 November 2011 the apostolic nuncio to Pakistan Archbishop Edgar Pena Parra blessed St. Peter’s Church, Karachi, now the largest Catholic church in Pakistan. It can seat 7,000 people.

The feast of the Sacred Heart of Jesus was celebrated at St. Dominic's Church, Manzoor Colony, another mass centre of the parish, in June 2020.

== Increasing violence ==
On 6 September 2010, three bearded men shot Asghar Bhatti, 61, in front of St. Paul’s Church. Bhatti was the president of the parish committee. It appears that militants have now broadened their targets to include ordinary citizens. There is a growing pattern of violence against Christians in Pakistan as seen in incidents described in the pages below:

- Holy Rosary parish, Warispura
- Catholic Public High School
- St. Dominic's Church, Bahawalpur
- St. Jude's Church, Karachi
- St. Mary's Church, Sukkur
- Idara-e-Amn-o-Insaf

== Synod ==
In March 2018, Daniel Bashir, a young doctor from the parish attended the Synod on young people at the Vatican.
