= List of Catholic dioceses in Pakistan and Afghanistan =

The Roman Catholic Church in Pakistan is composed of 2 ecclesiastical provinces, 4 suffragan dioceses and an apostolic vicariate.

== List of dioceses in Pakistan ==
=== Episcopal Conference of Pakistan ===
==== Ecclesiastical Province of Karachi ====
- Archdiocese of Karachi
  - Diocese of Hyderabad in Pakistan

==== Ecclesiastical Province of Lahore ====
- Archdiocese of Lahore
  - Diocese of Faisalabad
  - Diocese of Islamabad-Rawalpindi
  - Diocese of Multan

==== Exempt jurisdiction ====
(Immediately subject to the Holy See)

- Apostolic Vicariate of Quetta

== See also ==
- Catholic Church in Pakistan
- Christianity in Pakistan
- List of cathedrals in Pakistan
- List of Catholic dioceses (structured view)
- List of Catholic dioceses (alphabetical)
