= Portiuncula Friary =

The Franciscan Portiuncula Friary is the oldest friary in Pakistan, founded in 1940. It is located in Gulshan-e-Iqbal, Karachi, adjacent to the Christ the King Seminary. It is the Pakistani base of the Order of Friars Minor, a mendicant Catholic religious order founded by Saint Francis of Assisi in 1209.

== History ==
It was named after the chapel Portiuncula (meaning little portion in Italian) dedicated to St Mary of the Angels near Assisi in Italy. It was here that Saint Francis of Assisi first heard the call to rebuild the Church.

Bishop Hector Catry, O.F.M. Cap. of Lahore travelled to Karachi to bless the friary on March 31, 1940.

The Friars Minor arrived in Karachi from the Netherlands on January 13, 1934. They officially took over the mission from the Society of Jesus on June 22, 1935.

Father Valens Wienk became the first provincial superior of the mission. In November 1936, Father Salesius Lemmens became the ecclesiastical superior of the Karachi mission. The Friary was designed by the prolific Franciscan architect Brother Hilary Lardenoye OFM.

The Second World War also caused a disruption in the supply of fresh vegetables in the city. The Friary grew vegetables for their own use. They then turned to supplying St. Patrick’s and St. Lawrence’s Parishes with fresh produce at competitive prices. They had a cabin in the St. Lawrence’s Church compound which was patronised by parishioners who would go there after Mass.

Fr. Liberius Pieterse OFM was one of the first to join the teaching staff of the Friary. He taught philosophy, Greek, Hebrew and music.

The friars and diocesan priests worked in the mission of Sindh and Baluchistan administering parishes in Karachi, Kotri, Hyderabad, Sukkur and Quetta. The friars eventually began to visit prisoners and work among drug addicts and the handicapped.

In 1951, 25 Catholic families living across the Lyari River from the Friary formed the beginning of St. Jude's Parish. The Friars were asked to take responsibility for the new parish. Fr. Edouald OFM was the first parish priest.

The Friary celebrated its golden jubilee on September 17, 1990. Speaking on the occasion, Auxiliary Bishop Anthony Theodore Lobo of Karachi said the mission of the friars is similar to that of Saint Francis of Assisi, who stressed the need to live the Gospels in daily life.

== Notable friars ==
Over the years the Friary has produced some important workers for the Church in Pakistan:

- Bonaventure Patrick Paul, Bishop of the Roman Catholic Diocese of Hyderabad.
- J. B. Todd OFM, teacher, vice-principal and principal in St Patrick's High School, Karachi, St Francis Grammar School, Quetta, St. Mary’s High School, Sukkur, and St Bonaventure's High School, Hyderabad for over 50 years.
- Augustine Fernandes, Professor, gifted preacher and relationship counselor
- Sebastian Francis Shah, Archbishop of the Roman Catholic Archdiocese of Lahore
- Louis Mascarenhas, priest, academician and educator.
- Samson Shukardin, Bishop of the Diocese of Hyderabad

To increase co-operation between provinces, in 2009 Vernon Chua, a 5th year friar from Singapore came to the Karachi friary for studies and to share in the life of the friars here.

The friary has become an important venue for seminars and conferences, like the seminar on the "Importance of human rights in the current scenario" organized by the National Commission for Justice and Peace on September 26, 2009.

In 2012 there were only 45 Franciscans working in Pakistan.

== Crime ==
On August 13, 1997, robbers held up Father Seig Zeinstra at the Friary residence for senior friars and made off with a large amount of cash.

On November 24, 1997, around 9:30 p.m. three masked intruders held up three college students at gunpoint, demanding money and valuables. Amir 22 was shot in the struggle and died. The incident took place in the rooms rented to the students by the Friary.

On April 14 and 15, 2012, the Church held a community protection training program at the Friary to safeguard minorities from the recent crime and violence.

== Milestones ==
In August 2014 the friary celebrated the platinum jubilee of its establishment.

Archbishop Sebastian Francis Shaw, O.F.M., of Lahore, gave the homily at the August 2 Mass of thanksgiving for the 75th anniversary of the friary. He preached on the charity to which the friary has witnessed with its service and faith formation over the years. He himself joined the Order of Friars Minor in 1989, and recalled “having grown in the bosom of this friary.”

The friary's guardian, Fr. Younis Hussain, O.F.M., welcomed Archbishop Shaw, Archbishop Joseph Coutts, members of other religious orders, and local faithful to the celebrations.

Fr. Yusuf Bagh, O.F.M., head of the Custody of St. John the Baptist in Pakistan, also welcomed the guests participating in the jubilee.

Fr. Louis Mascarenhas, O.F.M., outlined the friary's history and passed on a message of hope to younger Franciscans.

Joining in the celebrations were the Franciscan Sisters of the Missionaries of Mary; the Franciscan Missionaries of Christ the King; the Franciscan Sisters of the Heart of Jesus; the Missionaries of Charity; Dominican Sisters of St. Catherine of Siena; and the Albertine Franciscans.
