= Joseph Indrias Rehmat =

Roman Catholic bishop based in Pakistan

His Grace Joseph Indrias Rehmat
- Bishop of Faisalabad
- Church: Roman Catholic
- Diocese: Faisalabad
- Appointed: 29 June 2019
- Predecessor: Joseph Arshad
- Previous post: Dean of the National Catholic Institute of Theology

Orders
- Ordination: 25 September 1992 by John Joseph (bishop)
- Consecration: 13 September 2019 by Joseph Cardinal Coutts

Personal details
- Born: Joseph Indrias Rehmat; July 1, 1966 (age 59) Okara, Punjab, Pakistan
- Denomination: Roman Catholic
- Education: Doctorate in Moral Theology
- Alma mater: Alphonsian Academy, Rome, Italy
- Motto: Faith in Action

Joseph Indrias Rehmat (born 1 July 1966) is the Roman Catholic Bishop of Faisalabad in Pakistan.

On June 29, 2019 Pope Francis appointed Father Joseph Indrias Rehmat, of the Diocese of Faisalabad, currently Dean of the National Catholic Institute of Theology, as Bishop of the Roman Catholic Diocese of Faisalabad.

He was born on 1 July 1966 in Okara. He began his education at St. Albert High School in Gojra city. He entered the St. Thomas the Apostle Minor Seminary and he completed his studies at the Christ the King major Seminary in 1992. He was ordained a priest on 25 September 1992 for the diocese of Faisalabad. In 2000 he obtained a Doctorate in Moral Theology at the Alphonsian Academy in Rome.

Since his ordination he has had the following appointments: 1992-1995 Parish priest at Chak 424, in Faisalabad; since 2000, Professor of moral theology at the National Catholic Institute of Theology; 2000-2006, Professor at the Christ the King Major Seminary in Karachi; 2006-2008, priest in the diocese of Hyderabad; 2009-2014, parish priest of the Sacred Heart parish in Karachi; since 2014, Dean of the National Catholic Institute of Theology in Karachi

Bishop Rehmat replaces Archbishop Joseph Arshad who was transferred to the Islamabad-Rawalpindi Diocese in December 2017.

Bishop Rehmat has already begun to represent the diocese by participating in the delegation from the Pakistan Catholic Bishops' Conference which met Prime Minister Imran Khan on July 4, 2019, with a donation on behalf of the Catholic community.

He was ordained bishop on 13 September 2019 at La Salle High School Faisalabad. The Principal Consecrator was Joseph Cardinal Coutts, Archbishop of Karachi and his Co-Consecrators were Archbishop Christophe Zakhia El-Kassis, Apostolic Nuncio and Archbishop Joseph Arshad, Bishop of Islamabad-Rawalpindi.

On August 16, 2023, Rehmat celebrated Mass held in Jaranwala where thousands of people were displaced from their homes after 24 churches and many Christian homes were attacked by mobs claiming desecration of the Qur'an.
