= Monastery of the Angels (Hollywood) =

Former monastery in California

- Interactive map of Monastery of the Angels

Monastery information
- Order: Dominican Order
- Denomination: Catholic Church
- Established: 1924; 102 years ago
- Disestablished: 2022; 4 years ago
- Mother house: Monastery of St. Dominic, Newark, New Jersey
- Dedication: Our Lady of the Angels
- Archdiocese: Los Angeles

People
- Founders: Mother Mary of the Eucharist, O.P.
- Prioress: Sister Maria Christine Behlow, O.P.

Architecture
- Functional status: Treatment Facility
- Architect: Wallace Neff
- Style: Spanish Colonial Revival
- Groundbreaking: 1948
- Completion date: 1949
- Closed: September 2022

Site
- Location: Carmen Avenue, Hollywood Hills, Los Angeles, California
- Country: United States
- Coordinates: 34.1078°N 118.3229°W
- Public access: No

The Monastery of the Angels was an American monastery of nuns of the Dominican Order located in the Hollywood Hills neighborhood of Los Angeles, California. Founded in 1924, it was the first enclosed religious order to be established in the region. With their practice of perpetual adoration of the Blessed Sacrament, the community served as a spiritual oasis to the people of the city, especially to members of the film industry, many of whom supported it until its closing in 2022.

== History ==
The founding of the monastery was promoted in the early 1920s by Sister Mary of the Eucharist, O.P., a member of the Monastery of St. Dominic, in Newark, New Jersey, the first monastery of Dominican nuns established in the United States. Seeking to expand, the community petitioned John J. Cantwell, the Archbishop of Los Angeles, for permission to found a community there. This permission arrived on March 17, 1924. Cantwell noted that he had received a number of requests from contemplative communities to establish themselves in the archdiocese, but he was giving priority to their Order. A group of five volunteers, to be headed by now-Mother Mary of the Eucharist, were soon organized and sent to Los Angeles to establish the community.

Upon their arrival, the nuns were welcomed by the Sisters of St. Joseph, with whom they stayed until they could find their own home. They soon took up residence at 728 West 28th Street, near Exposition Park, in the former home of mining geologist Newton Horace Winchell. This would be their temporary home until a more permanent facility could be established.

Living a cloistered life with their popular Chapel of Perpetual Adoration on a regular residential street soon proved taxing, however. Thus in 1934, the nuns obtained a more suitable property when they were able to purchase the former mansion of a Canadian-born copper king Joseph Louis Giroux (d. 1933), on Carmen Avenue in Hollywood. The house had been designed in 1912 by master architect Frederick Roehrig, with landscaped gardens by Arthur E. Simpson. The grounds included vast lawns, terraces, fountains, rare plant specimens and long driveways lined with palm trees. The attraction of the property surprised the prioress who supervised its selection, as one of her instructions to the realtor had been, "Show me anywhere but Hollywood!” The purchase was accomplished with the support of some of Los Angeles’ wealthiest families of the era, including by the families of Edward L. Doheny, Isidore B. Dockweiler, George Allan Hancock, as well as the Van de Kamp's. In 1948, the Catholic women of the city joined forces to raise the funds to build a more appropriate facility for the community. Maureen O’Sullivan was the chairwoman, and sponsors included Edith Head, Louella Parsons, Irene Dunne and the society reporter Princess Conchita Sepulveda Pignatelli, of the noted Sepúlveda family of California.

During the following decades, the community established itself as an oasis of peace to the nearby rush of life in Hollywood, especially to members of the film industry. Friends of the community included celebrities such as Bing Crosby and Jane Wyman, who, in addition to her other financial contributions, donated a life-sized statue of "Our Blessed Mother Mary Inspiring St. Dominic with the Rosary" by Gemma D'Auria.

In 1958 the community received a request from Joseph Cordeiro, the Archbishop of Karachi, to start a new foundation in his diocese. With the consent of the community and the superiors of the Order, the prioress, Mother Mary Gabriel, retired from her office and, accompanied by one nun, Sister Mary Imelda, traveled to that country in April 1959 to establish a new monastery with the same name in Karachi, Pakistan, to support the missionary work of the friars of the Order in that country.

By the early 21st century, the membership in the community began to see a significant decrease from the high of 30 members in 1950, as was widely experienced by other religious communities of the Catholic Church in the United States and elsewhere, largely due to the aging of the community. With several deaths in the community due to the COVID crisis in 2020, the community was down to six members. Two years later, the remaining nuns moved to other communities.

== Transition ==
Friends of the community and neighbors saw the inevitable decline of the community and in 2021 started to organize to save the property from a fate not in keeping with its heritage. They formed an association of Friends of the Angels to search out satisfactory solutions to the problem.

For several years after the closing of the Dominican community, the nuns joined with the friars of the Order in seeking some way to pass on the property in a way in keeping the thrust of their way of life. Various proposals were presented.

On February 6, 2026, it was announced that the monastery property had been acquired by Homeboy Industries, an organization founded in 1988 by a Jesuit priest, Gregory Boyle, who describes it as one of the largest organizations in the nation to deal with gang violence. The organization acquired it to provide a residential treatment center for those in need of drug rehabilitation or dealing with mental illness. The buildings would be renovated to provide a shelter for this while preserving the exterior of the monastery.
