= Augustine Soares =

Pakistani Roman Catholic priest (died 2019)

- Born: Karachi
- Died: 15 September 2019
- Occupation: Catholic priest
- Employer: Catholic Archdiocese of Karachi
- Known for: Rector, Christ the King Seminary
- Board member of: National Catholic Institute of Theology

Augustine Soares was a Roman Catholic priest in Karachi, Pakistan. He was born in Karachi and received his religious training at the Christ the King seminary. He was ordained a priest of the Roman Catholic Archdiocese of Karachi in 1969.

== Biography ==
Soon after his ordination he was sent to Rome for higher studies. After returning from Rome he served as Assistant Parish Priest at the Cathedral Parish, where he took a special interest in youth groups.

Fr. Soares also taught religion in 1972 at St Patrick's High School, Karachi.

For much of his ministry he served as a dedicated Parish Priest, first as Pastor of St. John's Church in Drigh Colony and later at the new parish of St. Thomas' Church across the Drigh Road.

In 1996 Soares was secretary of the Clergy Commission of the Catholic Bishops Conference of Pakistan. He was also named to lead a formation course for new priests in 1997.

From 2001 – 2005 he was Rector of the Diocesan St. Pius X Minor Seminary in Karachi.

On 22 April 2005 he was appointed Rector of Christ the King Major Seminary by Cardinal Crescenzio Sepe, Prefect of the Congregation for the Evangelisation of Peoples.

He saw the seminary celebrate its golden jubilee in 2006.

In 2008 he introduced the Cardinal Cordeiro Cricket tournament which the seminary has been hosting to promote religious vocations and remember Pakistan's first cardinal.

In 2010 he was also rector of the National Catholic Institute of Theology in Karachi.

On 4 May 2012 Fr. Benjamin Shahzad was appointed Rector of the Christ the King Major Seminary while Soares was appointed judicial vicar of the Archdiocese.

In August 2015 Soares was reported to be the Parish Priest of St. Jude's Church, Karachi.

In June 2019, Soares hosted an iftar dinner for nearly two dozen Muslim Imams of different mosques and local leaders of several religious and political groups, to celebrate the holy month of Ramazan. In 2019 Soares also celebrated the golden jubilee of his ordination to the priesthood.

Soares died in Holy Family Hospital, Karachi on 15 September 2019.
