= San Bonaventura da Bagnoregio =

- Chiesa di San Bonaventura da Bagnoregio
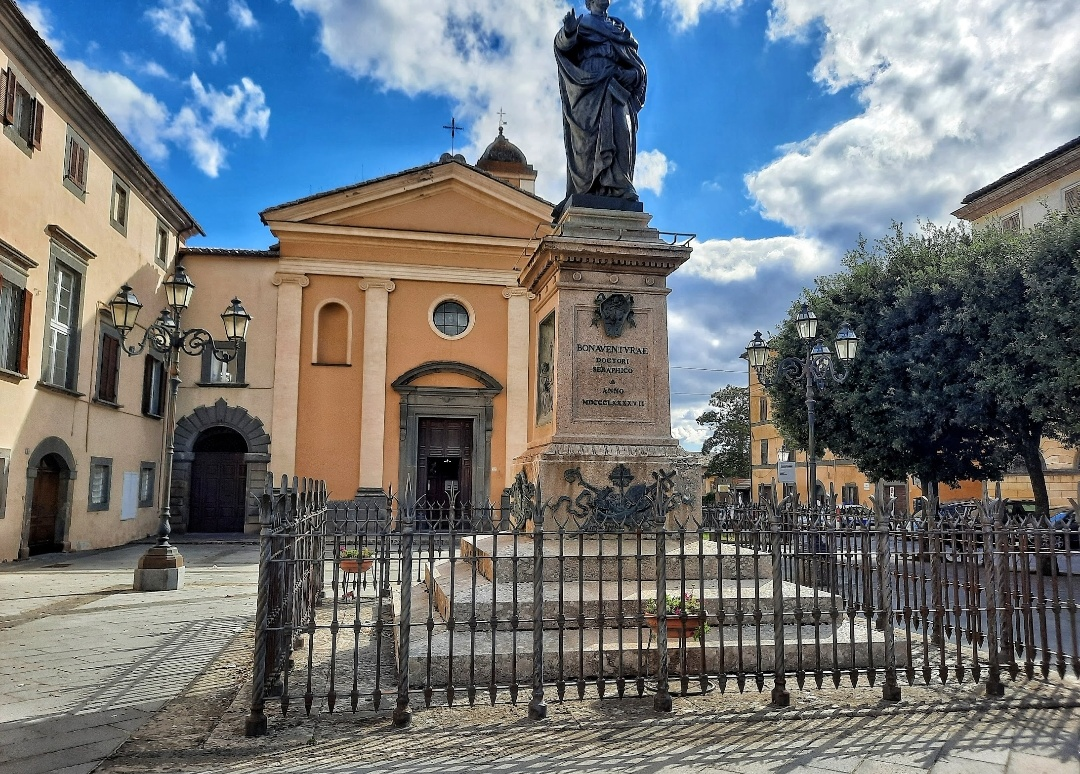
- Church of San Bonaventura da Bagnoregio, Rome, Italy
- Click on the map for a fullscreen view
- 41°52′11″N 12°34′21″E
- Location: Via Marco Calidio 22, Rome
- Country: Italy
- Language: Italian
- Denomination: Roman Catholic
- Tradition: Roman Rite
- Website: parrocchiasanbonaventura.it

History
- Status: Titular church
- Dedication: Bonaventure
- Consecrated: 19 May 1999

Architecture
- Functional status: Active
- Architect: Francesco Paolo Riccobene
- Groundbreaking: 1974
- Completed: 1999

Administration
- Diocese: Rome

San Bonaventura da Bagnoregio is a titular church located in Rome, Italy.

== Location ==
San Bonaventura da Bagnoregio is located to the east of Centocelle Airport. The nearest Metro station is Parco di Centocelle.

It is not to be confused with the church of San Bonaventura al Palatino, located on the Palatine Hill.

== History ==
On 1 November 1974 the parish was established by Cardinal Ugo Poletti and entrusted to the Minorites. The church was designed by Francesco Paolo Riccobene and consecrated on 19 May 1999 by Cardinal Camillo Ruini.

In 2018, Pope Francis declared it a titular church and assigned it to Joseph Coutts, Archbishop of Karachi.

== Cardinal-Priests ==
- Joseph Coutts (29 September 2018–present)
