= Agahi (newspaper) =

Pakistani newspaper

- Format: Weekly newspaper
- Owner: Roman Catholic Archdiocese of Karachi
- Editor-in-chief: Fr. Arthur Charles
- Founded: November 26, 2006
- Language: Urdu
- City: Karachi
- Country: Pakistan
- Circulation: 10,000 (as of December 2015)
- Sister newspapers: The Christian Voice
- Website: agahinews.com.pk
- Free online archives: yes

Agahi (Urdu: آگاہی) is a weekly published by the Roman Catholic Archdiocese of Karachi. It is the first such paper to be published in Urdu – the national language – not only in the diocese but in the whole country. The Roman Catholic Archdiocese of Lahore publishes an Urdu-language newspaper called Catholic Naqib but this is a fortnightly publication.

The planned format is to have a minimum of eight pages plus two to four pages of announcements and advertisements.

Agahi's editor, Fr Arthur Charles, is convinced about the suitability of the title of the newspaper, which aims to impart "knowledge, information and insight". The newspaper features eight pages of editorial with another two to four for advertisement.

Archbishop Evarist Pinto said: "In our age more than in any other, we can not neglect the influence of the media and mass communication and their potential for proclaiming the Word of God. I keep on stressing that we need to engage more actively in our Catholic media."

The Archdiocese already has an English weekly, The Christian Voice. The Urdu weekly will be in the same style and format. The contents will comprise official news both from the Archdiocese and the Holy See, news and views of interest from other dioceses, reports from around the world, features focusing on biblical, theological, liturgical, moral and social issues."

The first Urdu Catholic weekly in Pakistan, launched on November 26, 2006 in the Karachi Archdiocese, has launched an online edition in 2008. About 15,000 Catholics including priests and nuns joined the launch of the Agahi website on March 20 after Holy Thursday Mass at Saint Patrick's Cathedral in Karachi.

Before the Archdiocese of Karachi launched Agahi, they consulted respected Catholic journalist Robin Fernandez about the direction the weekly should take.

In 2008, Archbishop Evarist Pinto inaugurated and browsed the website (www.agahinews.com). The online edition offers the full contents of the tabloid-size archdiocesan weekly, to be posted on the Internet every Monday.

From 2009 to 2016 the newspaper has been giving awards to people for outstanding Christian journalism. In a ceremony held on November 24, 2016 the chief guest was Evarist Pinto, Archbishop Emeritus of Karachi. Distributing the prizes was Fr. Indrias Rehmat, Dean of National Catholic Institute of Theology.

In December 2015, the circulation has grown to about 10,000 copies per week.

== Editors ==
The Archbishop named Julius Nadeem Gill as the first editor. Gill has a postgraduate degree in Mass Communication, and has eight years of experience in the print and electronic media and other aspects of communication.

In 2011 Ayyaz Gulzar became editor of Agahi. He is a reporter for UCA News and heads the Catholic Bible Commission in the Karachi archdiocese. In December 2011 Gulzar won an award for editing the diocesan weekly.

As of 2013, Iqbal Anjum was the Editor of Agahi, after the resignation of Khurram Pervez.
