= Sacred Heart Church, Keamari =

Sacred Heart Church
- Location: Andrew Road, Keamari, Karachi
- Country: Pakistan
- Denomination: Roman Catholic

History
- Founded: 1862
- Events: destroyed 1969

Architecture
- Years built: 1969

Administration
- Archdiocese: Roman Catholic Archdiocese of Karachi
- Parish: Sacred Heart Parish

Clergy
- Priest: Father Gul Shehzad OFM

Sacred Heart Church is a 150-year-old church in a parish of the Roman Catholic Archdiocese of Karachi in Pakistan.

On September 18, 2011, Archbishop Evarist Pinto and eight priests celebrated Mass for over a thousand people to commemorate the 150th anniversary of the Church.

== History ==
The present church building was built in 1922 with funds provided by the Karachi Port Trust. There were approximately 200 Christian families living in Keamari at the time. In 1923 the Sacred Heart school was constructed. The medium of instruction was originally the Marathi language. The church has been heritage-listed.

In 1969 the Church caught fire and much of it was destroyed. The cause of the fire was never known. It was rebuilt with much of its essence being saved as possible.

On June 29, 2019 Pope Francis appointed Father Indrias Rehmat, a former parish priest, as Bishop of the Diocese of Faisalabad.

In July 2020, the Archbishop transferred 3 areas - Shireen Jinnah Colony, General Colony and Railway Colony and St Mary's School from St. Anthony's Parish to the Sacred Heart Parish.

== Ministries ==
The parish has two conferences of the Society of St Vincent de Paul, Pakistan. The parish is also home to the Sacred Heart Secondary School. The Apostleship of the Sea is based in this port parish.

== Parish priests ==
- Fr. Vittorine Fernandes O.F.M was appointed parish priest in 1922, when the port chaplaincy was elevated to a parish.
- Fr. Anthony Lobo
- Fr. Bruno Sequeira
- Father Thomas Gulfam
- Father Nazar Nawab
- Father Joseph Indrias Rehmat
- Fr. Nadeem Pyaralal
- Fr. Gul Shehzad OFM

== Violence ==
In November 1990 fanatics attacked the Sacred Heart Church. The parish priest Fr. Bruno Sequeira was brutally beaten. The mob tried to throw him in a fire made from the pews.

In 2009 thieves broke into the church on January 6 and took property worth 80,000 rupees (US$1,000). The chalice, a brass cross, the sound system and emergency lights were among the stolen items.

In October 2010 a special mass was celebrated to consecrate the century-old church vessels recently recovered from the robbery.

== Mass centres ==
- St. Joseph Church
- St. Anthony's Church, Manora
- Church of the Blessed Virgin Mary, Shireen Jinnah Colony
