= Simeon Anthony Pereira =

Pakistani archbishop

His Grace Simeon Anthony Pereira
- Archbishop of Karachi
- Church: Roman Catholic
- See: Karachi
- In office: 1993 – 2002
- Predecessor: Joseph Cordeiro
- Successor: Evarist Pinto
- Previous post: Bishop of the Roman Catholic Diocese of Islamabad-Rawalpindi

Orders
- Ordination: 24 August 1951

Personal details
- Born: 19 October 1927 Sukkur, Bombay Presidency, British India
- Died: 22 August 2006 (aged 78)

Simeon Anthony Pereira (19 October 1927, Sukkur, British India - 22 August 2006, Karachi) was a former archbishop of Karachi.

== Life ==
Pereira was educated at St Patrick's High School, Karachi. He received his religious training at the Papal Seminary, Kandy, Sri Lanka and was ordained a priest on 24 August 1951. He first worked as secretary to Franciscan Archbishop James Cornelius van Miltenburg of Karachi, and Chaplain to the Sisters and flock at Manora.

His next posting was as Father-in charge of the Don Bosco Boarding for boys in Karachi. In 1952, he proceeded to Quetta as assistant rector of St. Pius X Minor Seminary. A few years later, he was appointed Parish Priest of Saint Francis of Assisi Church, Old Haji Camp. His next appointment was as Parish Priest of Saint John's Church, Drigh Road, Karachi.

Following the liturgical reforms of the Second Vatican Council, he worked with Father Liberius, a scholar and linguist, to introduce Urdu into the liturgy.

On 3 July 1971, Pope Paul VI appointed him Auxiliary Bishop of Rawalpindi, Pakistan. On 17 December 1973 he was appointed Bishop of the Roman Catholic Diocese of Islamabad-Rawalpindi. He was bishop of Rawalpindi for nearly 20 years. On 22 March 1993 he was appointed Coadjutor Archbishop of the Roman Catholic Archdiocese of Karachi. He succeeded Cardinal Joseph Cordeiro as Archbishop of Karachi on 11 February 1994 and retired from that office on 20 November 2002.

Pereira celebrated the silver jubilee of his episcopal ordination on 4 October 1996, with a bilingual Mass concelebrated with retired Franciscan Bishop Bonaventure Patrick Paul.

After retiring in November 2002, he served as pastor of St. Thomas Church in Malir and as chaplain of the Dominican nuns at the Monastery of the Angels in Landhi. He was also president of the Catholic Bishops' Conference of Pakistan.

Pereira died on 22 August 2006.
