= Arnold Heredia =

Arnold Heredia is a Roman Catholic priest who was born in Karachi, Pakistan in 1940. He attended the Christ the King Seminary (Pakistan) and was ordained a priest of the Roman Catholic Archdiocese of Karachi in 1965. Among his pastoral work he served tribal people in the interior of Sindh province.

== Biography ==
In 1969 Father Heredia founded the Pakistan Christian Industrial Service in collaboration with Lee Lybarger and others.

Inspired by the collaboration within the Christian Conference of Asia (CCA), he helped establish Idara-e-Amn-o-Insaf (justice and peace commission) in 1972. While at St. Francis Parish, Karachi, he launched a program on adult education and social development. He also published a monthly Urdu-language pamphlet, "Sawera" (dawn) which, later on, developed into "Jafakash," the Idara's magazine for workers.

In recognition of his commitment to the cause of human rights in Pakistan, Father Heredia has been elected a member of the Central Committee of the Human Rights Commission of Pakistan in 1988.

Father Heredia has also served as Rector of the Christ the King Seminary.

A book written by Father Heredia, "Lok Tanzeem Sazi" (organizing people) was published in 2000.

Fr. Heredia was among 17 protestors arrested and detained in Karachi on 10 January 2001. He was taking part in an anti-"Blasphemy Laws" protest held under the auspices of the All Faith Spiritual Movement in Karachi. He was released on 17 January 2001.

Since 2005 he has been serving as the Parish Priest of Saint Peter's Church, Epping, Australia.

In 2016, he set up an organisation LinCoN (Links & Consolidation Network) to help refugees from Pakistan resettle in safer environments.
