= List of cathedrals in Pakistan =

This is the list of cathedrals in Pakistan sorted by denomination.

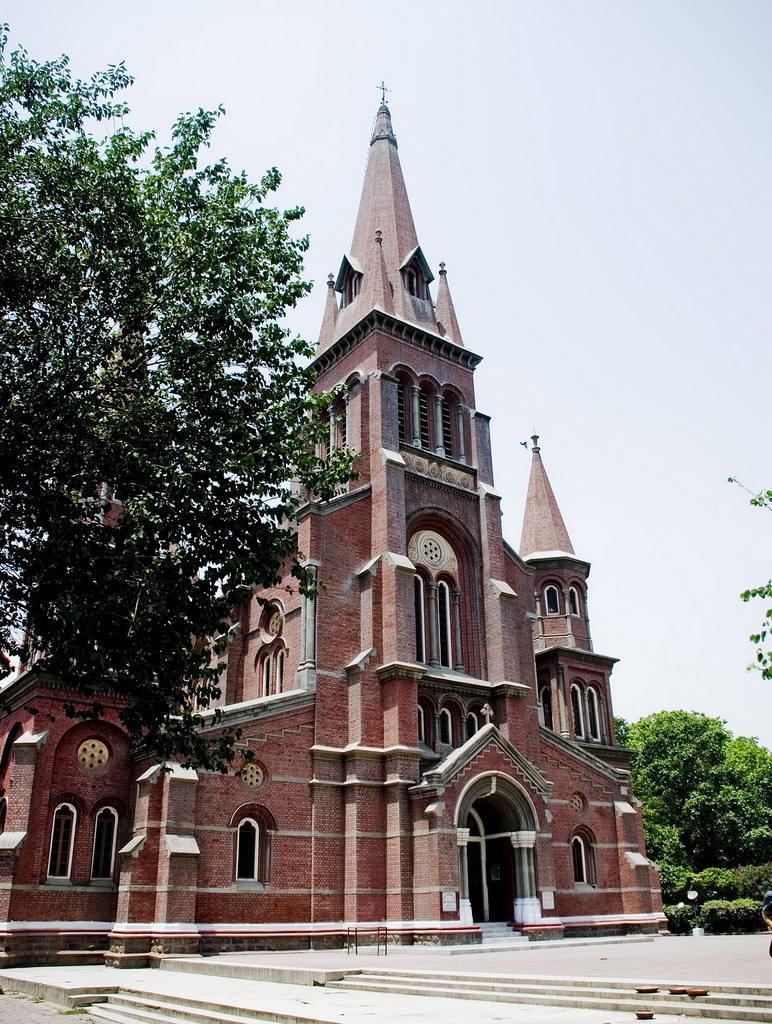
Sacred Heart Cathedral in Lahore

== Catholic ==
Cathedrals of the Catholic Church in Pakistan:

- Cathedral of Sts. Peter and Paul in Faisalabad
- St. Francis Xavier Cathedral in Hyderabad
- St. Joseph's Cathedral in Rawalpindi
- St. Patrick’s Cathedral in Karachi
- Sacred Heart Cathedral in Lahore
- Cathedral of the Resurrection in Multan
- Holy Rosary Church, pro-cathedral in Quetta

== Anglican ==
Cathedrals of the Church of Pakistan:

- Cathedral Church of the Resurrection, Lahore
- Holy Trinity Cathedral Church in Sialkot
- Saint John’s Cathedral in Peshawar
- St. Mary's Cathedral in Raiwind
- Holy Trinity Cathedral in Karachi

== See also ==
- List of cathedrals
- Christianity in Pakistan
