= George Ibrahim =

Father George Ibrahim was a Roman Catholic priest from Pakistan, who was killed on 5 July 2003. He was born in Khushpur, Punjab on 10 July 1964. He received his religious training at the Christ the King seminary and was ordained a priest on 3 September 1993.

Father Ibrahim was shot dead by armed men who broke into his parish of Our Lady of Fatima in Renala Khurd, Okara district, in the Roman Catholic Diocese of Faisalabad. His funeral was held on 18 July 2003, and was attended by more than 3,000 people. The service was performed by Bishop Joseph Coutts of Faisalabad.

On September 3, 2003, a delegation of Christians asked the acting governor of Punjab, Afzal Sahi, to replace the police officer investigating the murder of Father George Ibrahim.
