= Hussain D'Silva Town =

Hussain D'Silva Town is a small housing colony in North Nazimabad, Karachi, Pakistan.

This housing colony developed in the late 1950s for the new upwardly mobile middle class, with its cottage-style houses, wide roads, parks, sewerage system, schools, and places of worship. Few houses had gates and most had waist high walls. St. Jude's Church which had moved from a house to a proper premises, was financed by people living in Hussain D'Silva Town.

== Construction ==
The Hussain-D'Silva Construction Company in Karachi, started by Ashfaq R. Hussain and partner Jerome D'Silva. The company began business in 1945 and was dissolved in the seventies. It was famous for expanding the city with its residential scheme Hussain-D'Silva Town in North Nazimabad, an area that was otherwise uninhabited at the time. From 1949 to 1951, the pair worked on Hussain-D'Silva Town putting up 450 houses on land allotted by the Karachi Development Authority.

== Notable residents ==
- Xavier Sisters

== Decline ==
In 2017 the condition of the town seems to have deteriorated. Poor sanitation and heaps of garbage around the town are leading to throat infections, fever, and skin allergies. This has resulted in a surge in the number of patients attending hospitals and clinics in the area.

Whereas the Town was once a dream come true for the emerging educated middle class, according to residents all this came to an end in the early 1970s. Squatter settlements have been cropping up alongside Hussain-D'Silva Town, responsibility for which has been laid at the door of the authorities.

Block -W- North Nazimabad, which was previously called Hussain D'Silva Town, is called Allama Iqbal Town in 2017. Although there is a tendency to use the old name sometimes.
