= St. Paul's English High School =

Saint Paul's English High School
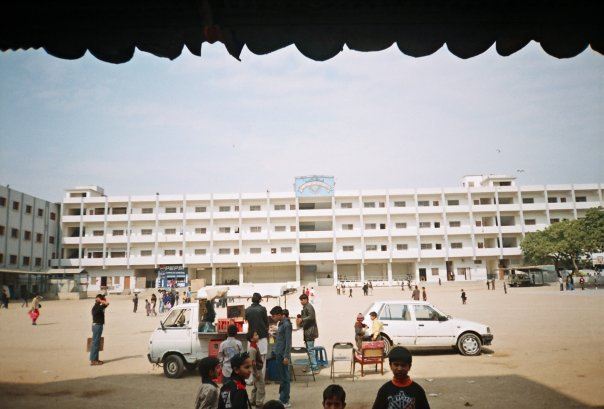
- The school's wing

Location
- Iqbal Shaheed Road, Karachi, Sindh; Pakistan
- Coordinates: 24°51′37″N 67°02′10″E

Information
- Other name: St. Paul's High School; St. Paul's
- Type: Private primary and secondary school
- Motto: Latin: Ad Destinatum Persequor (With zeal and perseverance I strive towards the goal)
- Religious affiliation: Catholicism
- Established: 1941; 85 years ago
- Founders: Franciscan Missionaries; Rev. Fr. Fulgence Kager; Gabriel Indrias; Sylvia Pinto
- Local authority: Catholic Board of Education
- Oversight: Catholic Board of Education
- Principal: Leonard Dias
- Gender: Boys (Campus A morning); Coed (Campus B morning and afternoon)
- Age: 4 to 17
- Houses: 4
- Nickname: Paul's
- Website: www.stpauls.edu.pk

Saint Paul's English High School, often abbreviated as St. Paul's or just Paul's, is a private Catholic primary and secondary school in Karachi, Sindh, Pakistan. The school is divided into two campuses: Campus A and Campus B. The students are divided into the morning and the afternoon shifts, the latter of which is of shorter hours. From 2017, Leonard Dias is the principal.

The two campuses provides kindergarten, elementary, and secondary education, with Sindh Board and O-Levels. The school houses various student facilities, such as a physics, chemistry, biology, and computer studies laboratory, two fully established libraries, a formerly operational mini-zoo, a large playground, a cricket pitch, a basketball court, three canteens and stationery shops, an auditorium, and specific rooms for various arts like traditional art, singing, music etc. The school was established in 1941 in the rooms of St. Patrick's Cathedral in Karachi, then it shifted to opposite of PNS Dilawar, on the site of a former graveyard.

St Paul's English School Campus B is situated on the same grounds as Campus A. Both the Campuses, as of 2017, have their medium of spoken and written language as British English.

== History ==
St. Paul's English High School was first established as an elementary school in 1940 at Kala Pul, Karachi, by the Franciscan Missionaries. It was then shifted to the Braganza Building in Saddar with only 4 grades. A fifth grade was initiated in 1942. Subsequently, the American Military Police took hold of Braganza Building, the school was then shifted to Younis Building on Freré Street. Classes were increased followed by a relocation to the library in St. Patrick's Cathedral. The school saw another relocation to Don Bosco's Orphanage, where it continued to remain partially established up till 1951. The hierarchy at the Catholic Church wanted to dedicate a proper parameter for the school, and with permission from the Pakistani government, they transformed the Churchyard, a former British graveyard, into new grounds for the school's establishment. The entire responsibility of the school was left with Fr. Fulgence Kager, assisted by Fr. James deSouza.

The school saw complete establishment and supposed evolution as the years went by. In 1952, the first batch of students appeared from the school for the annual Secondary School Certificate examinations.

Fr. Kager was shifted to the Archdiocese of Hyderabad, and Fr. Victor Kristen took his place. He remained in charge till 1956, when Fr. Lawry Pereira took his place. The title was later handed over to Fr. Armando Trindade, who augmented a second floor into the school building, along with a Kindergarten and Cambridge Section. After him, Fr. Varkey was appointed as head in 1969, where he was succeeded by Fr. Leslie Colaco in 1973. The responsibility was then handed to Fr. Joseph Paul in 1974, from where it was bestowed upon Fr. Max Rodrigues in 1984. The school celebrated its 50th anniversary, or Golden Jubilee, in 1991. Later the St Paul's Urdu High School and St. Thomas's School were denationalized by the Sindh Government and the responsibility was handed over to the Catholic Board. Fr. Max initiated an afternoon shift in the school premises to house the students of St. Thomas's, headed by Sr. Zita D'Cunha. Fr. Max's supervision saw an end when in the year 2000, Fr. Anthony Martis took his place. Fr. Martis headed the construction of a new wing on school premises, housing the Cambridge section and a well-established library, along with the construction of a second computer science laboratory, a choir room, and an arts and crafts room. The Reverend then continued to inaugurate yet another building opposite to the Cambridge Section, housing most of the upper elementary classes. Mr. Leonard Dias succeeded Fr. Anthony Martis.

In 2013, the school established St. Paul's Model United Nations, an MUN conference headed by the staff and students. A Photographic Society was also established in 2015. The school celebrated its 75th anniversary, or Platinum Jubilee, in the year 2016. The English Literary Society is one of the school's oldest societies and it organizes elocution and declamation events for the students. The school's English Literary Society also conducted the first edition of the school's annual inter-school declamation in November 2017. The school also has an Urdu "Tehzeeb" Society that organizes declamations in the Urdu language.

Ms. Sylvia Pinto and Ms. Safia Hassan are the only Golden Jubilarians of the school to date.

== Principals ==
- Fr. Fulgence Kager OFM 1951-58
- Fr. Lawrence Pereira 1958-64
- Fr. Armando Trindade 1964-73
- Fr. Leslie Colaco 1973-74
- Fr. Joseph Paul 1974-84
- Fr. Max Rodrigues 1984-2000
- Fr. Anthony Martis 2000-2014
- Mr. Leonard Dias 2014 – 2026
- Fr. Benjamin Shahzad 2026 - Present

== Notable alumni ==
- Bilal U. Haq – marine geoscientist and laureate of France's Prestwich Prize in geology
- S. B. John – ghazal singer
- Michael Nazir-Ali – Church of England bishop
- Qasim Umar – former Pakistani cricketer
- Shallum Asher Xavier – Pakistani musician; lead guitarist Fuzön
- Faisal Qureshi – Journalist and TV presenter
