= National Commission for Justice and Peace =

- Abbreviation: NCJP / CCJP
- Formation: 1985
- Headquarters: Lahore, Pakistan
- Parent organization: Pakistan Catholic Bishops' Conference
- Website: www.ncjp-pk.org

Catholic (National) Commission for Justice and Peace (NCJP) was formed in 1985 by the Catholic Bishops' Conference of Pakistan. It provides services in the field of human rights advocacy.

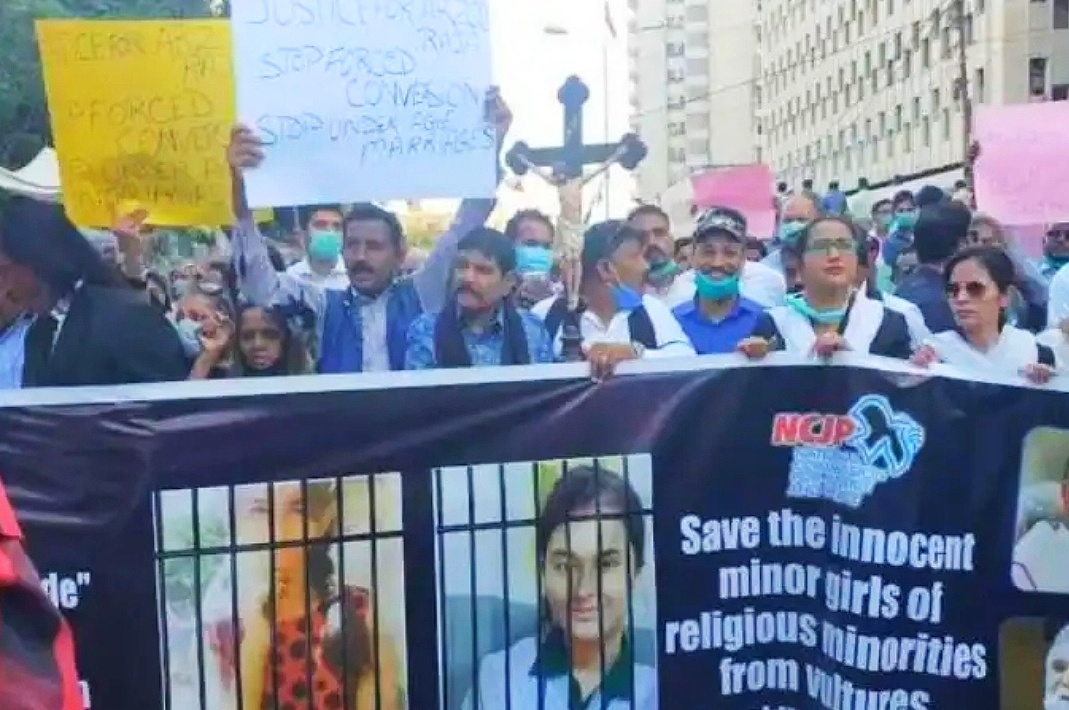
Protest against forced conversion of Christian girls in Pakistan organised by NCJP

== Leadership ==
=== Founding Chairperson ===
Bishop John Joseph (late) 1985 - May 1998

=== Chairperson ===
Bishop Samson Shukardin January 2021 onwards

Bishop Joseph Arshad January 2016 - December 2020

=== National Director ===
Father Emmanuel Yousaf Mani

=== Executive Director ===
Cecil Shane Chaudhry August 2013 - January 2021

Peter Jacob November 1995 - July 2013

== Regional offices ==
National Commission forJustice and Peace has seven regional offices in Rawalpindi, Gujranwala, Faisalabad, Multan, Bahawalpur, Yazman, Yazman Mandi, Mandi Yazman, Hyderabad, Quetta, Karachi and a head office in Lahore, which provide legal aid and human rights education. Under the legal aid program, the commission provides legal counselling and financial assistance. NCJP has dealt with about 800 cases during their first 22 years.

The first advocacy campaign was launched by NCJP against bonded labour in brick kiln factories in 1987. With other organizations joining in, this campaign achieved some success. A law on abolition of bonded labour was passed in 1992. The Commission now concentrates on bonded labour in the agricultural sector.

NCJP reacts to discriminatory laws and state policies. In 1988, the Commission filed an appeal in the Supreme Court of Pakistan against the system of Separate Electorates in the country.

In 1992 when the government tried to include religion on the National Identity Card, the civil society in Pakistan waged a countrywide campaign under the leadership of NCJP’s Chairperson Bishop John Joseph. The campaign was successful and the government was forced to withdraw the decision.

The Commission’s work has been lauded as courageous and it was named as almost the only voice for the Hindu minority.

In March 2010, the Commission opened an office in Karachi – its eighth in the country. The event marked the silver jubilee of the Commission. Father Saleh Diego is the Commission’s regional coordinator. In April 2019, Sindh governor Imran Ismail visited the iconic Saint Patrick's Cathedral in Karachi to participate in events celebrating its 175th anniversary.

National Commission for Justice and Peace is a member organization of the Asian Forum for Human Rights and Development (FORUM-ASIA).

== Blasphemy laws ==
Since 1990, the Commission has defended cases of blasphemy against Muslims, Christians and Hindus, and has campaigned for abolition of the blasphemy laws.

Father Emmanuel Y. Mani, National Director since 1995, spoke at a press conference sponsored by AsiaNews titled “Save Christians and Pakistan from the blasphemy laws”. He informed international public opinion about the institutional injustices against religious minorities, in particular against the Christian community in Pakistan. The international community is putting pressure on the Pakistani government to stop discrimination and violence against religious minorities.

Blasphemy laws include Article 295, Sections B and C, and Article 298, Sections A, B and C, of the Pakistan Penal Code. These laws were incorporated into the criminal justice system between 1980 and 1986 by then President of Pakistan Zia-ul-Haq, supposedly to ensure respect for the Prophet Mohammed, his Companions and the Quran. These laws are unique in the contemporary world because they allow dubious charges to be brought against people who have been subjected to extra judicial killings, arson and destruction of their property.

== Fundamentalism ==
In 2009 Peter Jacob, national secretary of NCJP, spoke out against the agreement between the local government and the Taliban, which allowed the introduction of sharia (Islamic) law, in exchange for a ceasefire in the district of Malakand, which includes the Swat valley, in the Khyber Pakhtunkhwa (old name Northwest Frontier Province). The agreement was signed in 2009 by the government of the NWFP and the Taliban.

== Education ==
Several civil society organisations have taken notice of religious hate speeches and school textbook content and urged the government to take the issue seriously. According to a recent report by NCJP, the commission monitored four major national Urdu dailies from August to October 2005 and found extremely provocative news reports, statements and editorials against religious minorities including Christians, Hindus, Ahmadis and Jews. School textbooks should be monitored for hate-content and revised to promote inter-faith harmony.

NCJP has demanded that the government make provision for non-Muslim students to receive religious lessons in their own faith in lieu of courses on Islamic belief and practice. Archbishop Lawrence Saldanha of Lahore, the commission's chairman, and Peter Jacob, its executive secretary, expressed their concern in a press release.

== Recognition ==
In November 2016, the Commission was awarded the 2016 Pax Christi International Peace Award for "the nonviolent struggle of the human rights community in Pakistan."

=== Cardinal appointed by Pope ===
On 20 May 2018, Pope Francis appointed Joseph Coutts of Karachi as a Cardinal (Catholic Church). Joseph Coutts was one of the 14 new cardinals announced by the Pope. He would be the second Pakistani archbishop to become cardinal after the death of Cardinal Joseph Cordeiro back in 1994. National Commission for Justice and Peace (Pakistan) Executive Director Cecil Chaudhry and Chairman Joseph Arshad welcomed the appointment and called it a historic moment of pride for the Pakistani Catholic community.

== Publications ==
- State of Religious Minorities in Pakistan
- Forced Conversion of Religious Minorities in Pakistan
