= St. Pius X Minor Seminary =

Pakistani Catholic seminary in Karachi

- Type: Minor Seminary
- Established: 1958
- Religious affiliation: Roman Catholic Archdiocese of Karachi
- Rector: Fr. Shahzad (June 2021-)
- Groundbreaking by: Archbishop Evarist Pinto
- Students: sirf 9
- Address: North Nazimabad, Karachi, Sindh, Pakistan
- Campus: 6,070 m^{2} (65,300 sq ft)
- Language: Punjabi

St. Pius X Minor Seminary is the preparatory seminary in the Archdiocese of Karachi. It is located in North Nazimabad, Sindh, Pakistan.

It had 21 seminarians in April 2008. Father Benjamin Shehzad was the seminary's rector from 2005 to 2012. In 2012 he was appointed Rector of Christ the King Seminary.

The seminary is one of four minor seminaries educating 92 seminarians in Faisalabad, Lahore, Karachi and Rawalpindi. Major seminary studies are split between St. Francis Xavier Seminary in Lahore, where 41 seminarians are studying philosophy, and Christ the King Seminary in Karachi, where 23 seminarians who have finished their study of philosophy are studying theology.

== Expansion ==
Due to congestion and other issues, a larger seminary building was constructed on ground adjacent to St. Jude's Church in Karachi. Archbishop Evarist Pinto performed the groundbreaking on the 2,044 m^{2} (22,000 sq ft) piece of land. Construction of the seminary began in October 2008, with completion targeted for October 2009.

In May 2011, Archbishop Evarist Pinto cut the ribbon and opened the much-needed newly constructed seminary. The archdiocese faced a vocation crisis for three decades as many applicants had to be turned away due to lack of space. The 12 minor seminarians have to move into the new block very soon. Spanning 6,070 square meters, the facility can accommodate more than 50 candidates and has a chapel, library and computer room. In 2010 the seminary received financial assistance for the construction of its new facilities from the Curé of Ars Parish in Leawood, Kansas, USA.

In June 2019 ten young men joined the seminary taking the total number of students to 30.

== History ==
St. Pius X Minor Seminary opened in 1958 in Quetta (later becoming the Apostolic Prefecture of Quetta) in Baluchistan Province. It was shifted to Catholic Colony in Karachi in 1973.

In August 2011, St Pius became the first seminary in Pakistan to provide internet access to its students.

== Rectors ==
- Fr. Joseph Cordeiro – 1952 - 1958
- Fr. Francis de Souza – 1958 – 1965
- Fr. Luperc Mascarenhas – 1965 - 1990
- Fr. James deSouza – 1990 – 1994
- Fr. Joseph D'Mello – 1994 - 2001
- Fr. Augustine Soares – 2001 - 2005
- Fr. Benjamin Shahzad – 2005 - 2012
- Fr. Benny Travas - 2012 - 2014
- Fr. Ryan Joseph - 2014 -2021
- Fr. Shahzad Arshad - 2021 -
