= Pakistan Catholic Bishops' Conference =

National assembly of catholic bishops

The Pakistan Catholic Bishops' Conference (PCBC) serves as the assembly of catholic bishops in Pakistan. Its primary objectives are to facilitate coordinated discussions on issues affecting the Church and to formulate common policies and actions that support the Church's mission in the country.

On 18 April 1990, the PCBC made the decision to establish a new seminary for philosophical studies in the Roman Catholic Archdiocese of Lahore, recognising the need for an additional institution beyond the Christ the King Seminary in Karachi, which was previously the only major seminary in Pakistan. In 1997, the PCBC further expanded its efforts by approving the establishment of the National Catholic Institute of Theology in Karachi to provide theological education in line with the renewal inspired by the Second Vatican Council.

== Presidents ==
Cardinal Joseph Cordeiro, 1958–1971 and 1973–1994

Archbishop Theotonius Amal Ganguly, C.S.C., 1971–1973

Archbishop Armando Trindade, 1994–2000

Archbishop Simeon Anthony Pereira, 2000–2002

Archbishop Lawrence Saldanha, 2002–2011

Archbishop Joseph Arshad, 2011–present

== Secretary General ==
Bishop Anthony Theodore Lobo, 1989–2010

Bishop Rufin Anthony, 2010–2015

== Commissions ==
National Commission for Justice and Peace

National Catholic Education Commission, Pakistan

Major Seminary

Muslim Christian Dialogue

Catechetics and Biblical Apostolate

Liaison with Charismatics

Ongoing Formation of Clergy

Revision of Urdu Catholic Bibles
