= Christ the King Seminary (Pakistan) =

Roman Catholic seminary in Karachi, Pakistan

- Type: Seminary
- Established: 1957; 69 years ago
- Religious affiliation: Catholicism
- Rector: Fr. Kamran Taj
- Academic staff: Frs. Shahbaz Nazir, Saghar Sabir & Dawood Akhter
- Students: 45 (2025)
- Location: Near Karim Residencia, 13 D III, Gulshan-e-Iqbal Town, Karachi, Sindh, Pakistan; 24°54′33″N 67°4′6″E
- Language: English and Urdu
- Sister institution: National Catholic Institute of Theology

The Christ the King Seminary is a Roman Catholic seminary in Gulshan-e-Iqbal Town, Karachi, Pakistan, located adjacent to the Portiuncula Friary. In its early years most of the faculty were provided by the Franciscans. It has been described as "the pioneering theological institution for the Catholic Church in Pakistan."

The high-water mark of the seminary's 50-year existence was the recruitment of 98 seminarians for the class that entered in 1990.

== Origins ==
On 5 April 1957 Pope Pius XII issued a decree through the Congregation of the Faith to build a regional seminary in Karachi.

When the seminary started in 1956 it had only four students. Among them was Archbishop Lawrence Saldanha of Lahore, who later went on to become its Rector. Other alumni include the Archbishop Emeritus of Karachi Evarist Pinto, the late Bishop Anthony Theodore Lobo of Islamabad-Rawalpindi, Joseph Cardinal Coutts, the late Bishop Andrew Francis of Multan, and the late Bishop John Joseph of Faisalabad and the late Bishop Patras Yusaf of Multan.

Fifty years on, the seminary has graduated 780 students from Pakistan and abroad, some coming from Bangladesh, India, Indonesia, Italy, the Netherlands and Sri Lanka. It also expanded over the decades, adding a grassy field for soccer and cricket, a basketball court, a pavilion, a retreat center and a Marian grotto with a fountain.

The National Catholic Institute of Theology (NCIT) was established at the seminary in September 1997, offering academic courses leading to a diploma in theology, as well as programs for laypeople and Religious involved in Church ministries. At the Institute students can now obtain a Bachelor of Theology degree from the University of Melbourne due to the efforts of Yarra Theological Union and the Melbourne College of Divinity.

== Developments ==
In 1994 the philosophy studies program for seminarians was separated from the theology program and moved to the St. Francis Xavier Seminary in the Lahore archdiocese.

In addition to dwindling vocations, the seminary has had to deal with a shortage of drinking water over the last 10 years, exacerbated by local authorities appropriation, without compensation, of its old well in November 2005 for the Lyari Expressway project.

The expressway project is part of Karachi's "Cleaning the City" drive, which the Asian Human Rights Commission says has rendered thousands homeless. It adds that 11,000 houses and 3,100 commercial buildings outside the path of the expressway have been evacuated and demolished.

Since 2008 the seminary has been hosting the Cardinal Cordeiro Cricket tournament to promote religious vocations and remember Pakistan's first cardinal. In 2010 there are 43 students from all six dioceses and the Apostolic Prefecture of Quetta.

In 2010, a grant from Aid to the Church in Need was made to the Seminary where it will be used for library books and new air conditioning units.

In 2011 there were 24 seminarians in the institution. By 2014 this had risen to 40.

On 4 May 2012 Cardinal Fernando Filoni, Prefect of the Congregation for the Evangelization of Peoples, appointed Fr. Benjamin Shahzad as Rector of the Seminary.

In June 2019 the number of seminarians had risen to 72.

== Rectors ==
The following individuals have served as rectors of the seminary:

Ordinal	Officeholder	Term start	Term end	Time in office	Notes
1	Rev. Innocent Laurensse, OFM	1956	1971	14–15 years	
2	Rev. Anslem Moons, OFM	1971	1974	2–3 years	
3	Rev. Lawrence Saldanha	1974	1979	4–5 years	
4	Rev. Emmanuel Asi	1979	1988	8–9 years	
5	Rev. Arnold Heredia	1988	1993	4–5 years	
6	Rev. Inayat Bernard	1993	2004	10–11 years	
7	Rev. Rufin Anthony	2004	2005	0–1 years	
8	Rev. Augustine Soares	2005	2012	6–7 years	
9	Rev. Benjamin Shahzad	2012	2019	6–7 years	
10	Rev. Kamran Taj	2019	incumbent	6–7 years	

== Notable alumni ==
- Rufin Anthony
- Joseph Arshad
- Joseph Coutts
- Patrick D'Rozario
- Andrew Francis
- Arnold Heredia
- George Ibrahim
- John Joseph
- Anthony Theodore Lobo
- Joseph Paul
- Evarist Pinto
- Joseph Indrias Rehmat
- Lawrence Saldanha
- Sebastian Francis Shah
- Augustine Soares
- Benny Travas
- Patras Yusaf
