= Joseph Paul =

Pakistani Roman Catholic priest (1937–2018)

Joseph Leonard John Paul
- Born: 1937; Karachi
- Died: 10 May 2018 (aged 80–81); St. Paul's High School, Karachi
- Education: MA (English) BEd
- Alma mater: Karachi University
- Occupation: Catholic priest
- Years active: 1962 - 2018
- Employer: Catholic Archdiocese of Karachi
- Known for: Principal, St. Paul's High School, Karachi
- Movement: Founder, Karwan-e-Amn (caravan for peace) Foundation

Joseph Leonard John Paul was a priest of the Roman Catholic Archdiocese of Karachi in Pakistan.

== Early life and education ==
Born in Karachi in 1937, he studied at the St Patrick's High School. He obtained a bachelor's degree in 1969, a master's in English in 1972 and a bachelor's in education in 1976.

He received his religious training at the Christ the King Seminary (Pakistan) and was ordained a priest at Saint Patrick's Cathedral, Karachi in January 1962.

== Career ==
He first served as the assistant rector at the St. Pius X Minor Seminary. In 1969, Father Paul became the assistant parish priest at St Patrick's Cathedral. He served as the principal of St Paul's English High School and St Paul's Urdu High School. From 1994 to 2001 he served as assistant parish priest at St. Jude's Parish, Karachi and was the principal of St Jude's High School for 11 years. In 2005, Fr. Paul was appointed the principal of St. Patrick's College (Karachi) and served there till 2009. In 2005, the Bharatiya Janata Party chief Mr. Lal Kishenchand Advani visited his alma mater St. Patrick's High School, Karachi. The principal at the time was Father Joseph Paul.

In 2001, Fr. Paul, a strong advocate for peace, also established the Karwan-e-Amn (caravan for peace) foundation to advance the cause of peace in the country.

In 2009, unidentified armed men shot at and injured Father Paul when he resisted the theft of his car in Baloch Colony in Karachi.

In January 2012, Father Paul celebrated the 50th anniversary of his ordination in Karachi. He served in Church schools for 43 years, during which time he played a vital role in getting back Church run educational institutions, which were nationalised in 1972.

Father Paul died on 10 May 2018 in Karachi.
