= Idara-e-Amn-o-Insaf =

Defunct NGO in Karachi, Pakistan

The Idara-e-Aman-o Insaf (Committee for Peace and Justice) was set up in 1974 by the Roman Catholic Archdiocese of Karachi and the Church of Pakistan in Karachi.

The Idare-e Amn-O-Insaf is an NGO. It is Pakistan-based and run by Pakistani Christians. The charity deals with social and labor issues, while it also publishes a magazine called Jafakash (Hard Worker). A recent issue dealt with Pakistan's controversial blasphemy laws. Tauqir Chughtai, a political and social commentator, was editor of the monthly Jafakash magazine from 1990 to 2002. For a while journalist Rahim Bakhsh Azad was also editor of Jafakash.

On 25 September 2002, seven Christians were killed at the Idare-e Amn-O-Insaf office in Karachi. These murders were the latest in a series of acts of violence targeting the Christian minority community in Pakistan.

On September 25, 2003, the two Church sponsors of the Idara marked the first anniversary of the killing of the seven Idara workers. A Mass was celebrated at St. Patrick´s Cathedral followed by a meeting of family members of the victims with Church officials and police. Idara administrator Zafar Iqbal said that the bishops were to meet soon to finalize the resumption of activities by the committee and it was hoped that the office could be open again in a few months.

There are two similar organizations for Social Action in Pakistan: the Human Development Center Toba Tek Singh and the Justice & Peace Commission - Multan. There is also a National Commission for Justice and Peace of the Catholic Church in Pakistan. In 2009, Peter Jacob was the executive secretary of the NCJP and Archbishop Lawrence Saldanha was the chairperson of the Commission.

After the murders in 2002 the Idara was not able to recover and never re-opened. However, a branch of the Idara-e-Amn-o-Insaf was reported to be functioning in Lahore in 2012.
