= St. Francis Xavier Seminary =

Catholic seminary in Lahore, Pakistan

- مقدس فرانسس زئویئر میجر سیمنری
- Motto: Fides quaerens intellectum
- Type: Major Seminary (Institute of Philosophical studies)
- Established: 18 April 1990
- Founder: Catholic Bishops' Conference of Pakistan
- Religious affiliation: Roman Catholic
- Academic affiliations: Pontifical Urban University, Rome
- Budget: Rs. 20.80 million (2011)
- Rector: Fr. Almas Daniel Archangelus
- Dean: Fr Dr Amjad Yousaf
- Inaugurated by: Cardinal Jozef Tomko
- Students: 100 (2021)
- Location: Yuhannabad, Lahore, Punjab, Pakistan
- Campus: 4 hectares (9.9 acres)
- Language: English and Urdu
- Degrees awarded: Baccalaureate in Philosophy

St. Francis Xavier Seminary is a Roman Catholic major seminary in Yuhannabad, near Lahore, Pakistan. It is an institute of philosophical studies serving the whole country. It offers a two-year program in Christian philosophy. It is affiliated to the Pontifical Urban University of Rome. The seminary is on four hectares (9.9 acres) of land next to the Christian housing estate of Youhanabad, 25 kilometres (16 mi) east of Lahore.

== History ==
The Catholic Bishops' Conference of Pakistan decided on 18 April 1990 to build this new seminary for philosophical studies in the Roman Catholic Archdiocese of Lahore. The first group of seminarians joined on 1 September 1994.

On December 2, 1994, the new building was opened by Cardinal Jozef Tomko, special envoy of the Vatican to Pakistan.

== Physical facilities ==
The physical structure consists of three blocks. One block houses the administration, staff residence, lecture rooms and library. Another block is the residence of the seminarians comprising dormitories, a common room, a small store, bathroom facilities and a room for the moderator of the group.

The third block houses the chapel, the dining room, the kitchen, the pantry, the kitchen store, the main store and a multipurpose hall used as a recreation hall by the seminarians. It is also used as a theatre for film shows and drama, not only for the seminarians but also for the people of the area. It is also used as an assembly hall.

The building is surrounded by a fairly large piece of land, which is being developed as a wheat and rice field also a vegetable garden; a small recreational spot, which includes a football ground, a basketball court and a Marian shrine.

== Current events ==
The first two years are spent in St Francis Xavier Seminary for the study of Philosophy. The Seminary teaches philosophy subjects like Greek, Ancient, Medieval, Modern, Western, Eastern and Islamic Philosophy in four semesters. English is the medium of instruction. Students who satisfy the study criteria are awarded the Diploma in Philosophy.

The seminary is also host to the St Francis Xavier School, built inside the seminary compound for the children of the poor, where the seminarians also teach catechism and English.

On 23 April 1999, the Seminary was officially affiliated with the Faculty of Philosophy of the Pontifical Urban University of Rome, which enabled it to award the degree of Baccalaureate in Philosophy. In 2008, 16 students wrote the B Ph examination of the Pontifical Urbaniana University and were awarded degrees.

In 2005 there were 25 seminarians.

In June 2011 the seminary had to increase its annual budget for its 52 seminarians from 250,000 rupees to 400,000 rupees because of expected price rises after a disappointing national budget.

In May 2020 the seminary received financial assistance from the charity Aid to the Church in Need to cope with problems created by COVID-19.

== Rectors ==
- Father Bernard Mangion MSSP, 1994-1997
- Father Ranjit SJ, 1998-2005
- Fr. Khalid Yusaf, 2005-2012
- Fr. Asif John, 2012-2018
- Fr. Almas Daniel Archangelus, 2018 -
- Fr. Tahir Aziz

== See also ==
- List of Jesuit sites
