= Holy Family Hospital, Karachi =

Karachi, Pakistan hospital

Holy Family Hospital ہولی فیملی ہسپتال

Geography
- Location: Karachi, Sindh, Pakistan
- Coordinates: 24°52′N 67°02′E

Organisation
- Care system: Private
- Type: District General, Community, Teaching
- Religious affiliation: Roman Catholic
- Affiliated university: College of Physicians and Surgeons Pakistan; Pakistan Nursing Council
- Network: Medical Missions Sisters

Services
- Beds: 225

History
- Opened: 1948

Links
- Lists: Hospitals in Pakistan

Holy Family Hospital (Urdu: ہولی فیملی ہسپتال) is a founded by Medical Mission Sisters Roman Catholic rural general hospital in Karachi, Pakistan.

== History ==
It was founded in 1948 by the Medical Mission Sisters, a Roman Catholic religious order for women based in Philadelphia, USA. This was at a time when very few health care facilities existed in Pakistan.

The founder of the Medical Mission Sisters, Doctor Anna Maria Dengel arrived in 1920 in Rawalpindi to work as a mission doctor at the 16-bed St. Catherine's Hospital. The hospital evolved into the Holy Family Hospital, Rawalpindi and continued to operate under the auspices of the Roman Catholic Diocese of Islamabad-Rawalpindi until 1977. In that year the diocese was no longer able to bear the financial burden of running the hospital and handed it over to the Government of Punjab. The Medical Mission Sisters went to work and focus exclusively at the Holy Family Hospital, Karachi.

Three of these Sisters worked together from 1967 to 2009 at the Hospital. Sister Elona Stanchak served as Administrator of the 225-bed hospital; Sister Celine Bernier was Directress of Nursing Services; and Sister Helen Marie McGrath taught at the hospital's nursing school. In 2009, they left Pakistan to return to the US. From 2005 to 2009, Sister Celine was on the board of the St. Vincent's Home for the Aged.

What will happen to the Holy Family Hospital, Karachi in times to come is an important question; the institution is a national heritage and a prized possession of the Roman Catholic Archdiocese of Karachi right in the heart of a bustling city and must be governed and administered professionally. Currently Dr. Glenis Piedade D'Sa D'Souza is officiating as Administrator.

Nearly 100 students are enrolled at the Holy Family Hospital nursing school. The students spend 3 years in basic nursing, and a 4th year in midwifery training. The school is registered with the Pakistan Nursing Council.

== Recognition ==
This hospital is accredited with the College of Physicians and Surgeons Pakistan to train doctors for specialization in medicine, surgery and obstetrics.

The hospital also has a large facility, the Holy Family Hospital auditorium, which is used for events such as the launch of Agahi, the first Urdu-language Catholic weekly in Pakistan launched in November 2006.

In September 2004, the Health department had identified some private hospitals, including Holy Family Hospital, Karachi as having the facilities where trauma patients could be treated. This is recognition of the high quality care provided and the important role played by the hospital over the years. By 2018, it was considered one of the major hospitals of the city.
