= James deSouza =

James "Jimmy" deSouza (11 December 1925 – 28 January 2016) was a Catholic priest, teacher, school principal and humanitarian.

== Biography ==
DeSouza was born in Karachi, Pakistan. He was educated at St Patrick's High School, Karachi. He received his religious training at the Papal Seminary, Kandy, Sri Lanka, which he entered in 1944 and was ordained a priest of the Roman Catholic Archdiocese of Karachi on 24 August 1951.

DeSouza taught at St Paul's English High School and then at St. Anthony's School. He was then appointed Principal of St. John Vianney’s School, a post he held for several years.

In 1963, along with Fr. Dalmatius Geurts, deSouza made an analysis of the situation and a feasibility study and came to the conclusion that there was a big demand for skilled craftsmen in Pakistan. The final plan was to build a school for Metal Work, Auto Mechanics, Electro-Technology, Air Conditioning & Refrigeration, and Carpentry. The St. Patrick's Technical School was set up in 1965 by Brother Norman Wray. In 2006 it became the St. Patrick's Institute of Science & Technology.

From 1963–73, deSouza was the pastor of a small Bengali-speaking community in Karachi, where he was involved with their repatriation to Bangladesh in 1973, working with the ICRC and UNHCR. He also taught at St Patrick's High School, where he recruited students to read to the blind at the Ida Rieu School. In 1974, he was appointed Rector of the St. Pius X Minor Seminary in Karachi.

From 1995-2000, deSouza served as St. Patrick’s Cathedral's 40th parish priest. One of his major achievements was in renovating the cathedral building during 1998-1999 with funds from parishioners, former parishioners and well-wishers in Karachi and abroad. The Cathedral was damaged when a bomb set off by suspected fanatics went off three days before Christmas in 1998.

DeSouza celebrated the Golden Jubilee of his priesthood in 2001. He was parish priest of St. Lawrence's Church, Karachi in 2006-2007.

DeSouza died in the early hours of 28 January 2016.
