= Joseph Arshad =

Pakistani Roman Catholic bishop

His Grace Joseph Arshad
- Archbishop-Bishop of Islamabad-Rawalpindi
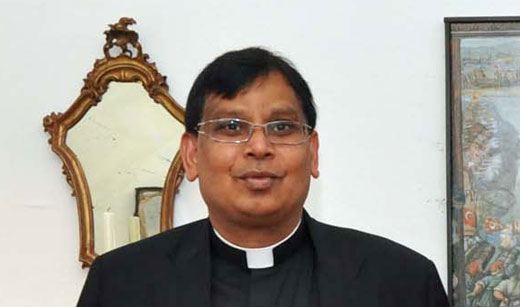
- Bishop Joseph Arshad
- Church: Roman Catholic
- See: Diocese of Islamabad-Rawalpindi
- In office: 2013–
- Predecessor: Joseph Coutts
- Previous post: Bishop of Faisalabad

Orders
- Ordination: November 1, 1991
- Consecration: November 1, 2013 by Fernando Cardinal Filoni
- Rank: Archbishop

Personal details
- Born: August 25, 1964 (age 61) Lahore, Pakistan
- Motto: Pax et spes
- Coat of arms

Joseph Arshad (born August 25, 1964) is a Pakistani Catholic prelate who has served as Bishop of Islamabad-Rawalpindi since 2013.

== Biography ==
Arshad was born on August 25, 1964, in Lahore. After completing school, he began his priestly education at St. Mary's Minor Seminary, Lahore. He continued his studies at Christ the King Seminary in Karachi. After his ordination on November 1, 1991, he was appointed Parochial Vicar of St. Joseph's Church and also given charge of St. Peter's School in Gujranwala. For a while he also studied journalism.

In 1995, he went to Rome for Canon Law studies at the Pontifical Urban University and then underwent training as a papal diplomat at the Pontifical Ecclesiastical Academy.

His doctoral dissertation “The responsibility of a diocesan bishop in defending the unity of the universal Church according to c. 392” was published by the Urbaniana University Press in 1999.

He was the first Pakistani priest to join the papal diplomatic service. From 1999 to 2002 he served at the Apostolic Nunciature in Malta. From then until 2010, he served at the Apostolic Nunciatures in Sri Lanka, Bangladesh, and Madagascar.

As of July 2013 he was a counsellor at the Apostolic Nunciature in Bosnia and Herzegovina.

Pope Francis on July 3, 2013, appointed Arshad Bishop of Faisalabad. The Diocese has an area of 35,300m^{2} and a population of 38,265,000, of whom 150,000 are Catholics with 42 priests.

After being ordained as a bishop on November 1, Arshad celebrated his first Mass in St. Joseph's Church, Lahore on November 3, 2013. He had completed his schooling from St Joseph’s High School in the Parish.

As head of the Commission for Social Communications, he attended the 15th Conference of Radio Veritas Asia listeners held on September 21, 2015, at Loyola Hall in Lahore. He invited the participants to build peace, tolerance and brotherhood in society via the radio.

On November 12, 2016, Bishop Arshad was appointed the Apostolic Administrator of the Diocese of Islamabad-Rawalpindi, which was vacant since the death of Bishop Rufin Anthony on October 17, 2016.

On December 10, 2016, Bishop Arshad received the National Human Rights Award 2016 from Pakistan President Mamnoon Hussain for human rights advocacy. Arshad is also the chair of the Catholic Bishop’s National Commission for Justice and Peace.

On November 10, 2017, he became president of the Catholic Bishops' Conference of Pakistan.

On December 8, 2017, Pope Francis transferred Arshad to become the Bishop of Islamabad-Rawalpindi in Pakistan, conferring on him the “personal title” of archbishop.

In July 2019, Arshad inaugurated a six-month preparatory course designed to help young men and women prepare for the Central Superior Services exam conducted annually to recruit people for top public service positions.

== External links section ==
Catholic Church titles
Preceded by Joseph Coutts	Bishop of Faisalabad; July 3, 2013 - December 8, 2017	Succeeded by Joseph Indrias Rehmat
Preceded by Rufin Anthony†	Bishop of Islamabad-Rawalpindi; December 8, 2017 -	Incumbent
