= James Cornelius van Miltenburg =

Dutch prelate

His Grace James Cornelius van Miltenburg
- Archbishop of Karachi
- Church: Roman Catholic
- See: Roman Catholic Archdiocese of Karachi
- In office: (1948)1950-1958
- Predecessor: Position created
- Successor: Joseph Cordeiro

Orders
- Ordination: 31 March 1935
- Consecration: 3 October 1948 by Francesco Benedetto Cialeo

Personal details
- Born: 14 September 1909 Harmelen, Netherlands
- Died: 14 March 1966 (aged 56) Hyderabad, Pakistan

James Cornelius van Miltenburg O.F.M., also known as Alcuin van Miltenburg (14 September 1909 - 14 March 1966), was a Dutch prelate of the Catholic Church who was a missionary bishop in Pakistan, the first bishop of Karachi and of Hyderabad, Pakistan.

== Biography ==
He was born on 14 September 1909 in Harmelen, Netherlands. He was ordained a Priest of the Order of Friars Minor on 31 March 1935.

Pope Pius XII named him the first Bishop of Karachi on 20 May 1948 and he received his episcopal consecration on 3 October. He became archbishop when the see of Karachi was raised to the status of an archdiocese in 1950.

Appointed the Holy See's Apostolic Delegate on 17 September 1950, he represented the Holy See in Pakistan. When the status of the delegation was raised to of an internuncio, a status that anticipates the appointment of an official with rank of ambassador and an inappropriate role for the ordinary of a diocese, van Miltenburg led the internunciature as its chargé d’affaires and the office of internuncio remained vacant until after his departure from Karachi.

Pope transferred him to the newly created Diocese of Hyderabad, Pakistan, allowing him to keep the personal title of archbishop.

He was also a Council Father at all four sessions of the Second Vatican Council.

He died in Hyderabad, Pakistan, on 14 March 1966.
