= Ida Rieu School =

School for blind and deaf children in Karachi, Sindh, Pakistan

Coordinates: 24°52′18″N 67°2′12″E

Location
- Numaish, opposite Mazar-e-Quaid; Karachi, Sindh; Pakistan

Information
- Type: School for blind and deaf children
- Established: 1922
- Founder: Ida Rieu Welfare Association
- Principal: Muzna Masood
- Gender: Male and female
- Age: 4+
- Enrollment: 900 Blind and Deaf Students (2019)

The Ida Rieu School for the blind and deaf was founded in 1922 in Karachi, Pakistan. It was named after Ida Augusta Rieu, the wife of the Commissioner of Sindh, J.L.Rieu.

Ida Rieu not only has a school for people with disabilities but also has a hostel, a college, and an old persons' home.

A large number of philanthropists support the school, which not only provides educational facilities but also imparts vocational training to the disabled students.

In 2006, five students, including four women, gained admission to the master's degree programme at the Ida Rieu College for the blind and the deaf. This is the first time that the institution had introduced a masters' level programme under the arts faculty at the University of Karachi.

On average, 12–16 students from Ida Rieu, including women, sit in the HSC exams; while another 10 or more, in the degree level exams. Some of the school's students have also earned top positions in the examinations. Qudsia Khan is the principal of the school.

In 2007, the blind students of Ida Rieu School achieved brilliant results in the Matriculation Examination. Ten blind girl students appeared, out of which three obtained first division and one the first class first position. Amongst the boys, nine appeared and three obtained first division. The overall result of both was 100 per cent. In 2008, there were over 900 blind and deaf students at the institution.

it has undertaken to provide the latest modified gadgets to allow the inclusion into information society i.e., Braille keyboards, screens, voice activated devices, special videos, and toys that promoted learning for children with varying degrees of blindness.

An extract from the 2023 census of the city's population reveals that visual problems affect 2.18 percent of the population, while hearing difficulties affect 2.51 percent.
