= National Catholic Institute of Theology =

- Type: Theological institute
- Established: September 1997; 28 years ago
- Founders: Catholic Bishops' Conference of Pakistan
- Religious affiliation: Roman Catholic
- Academic affiliations: University of Melbourne
- Dean: Fr. Shabaz Nazir
- Administrative head: Board of Governors
- Undergraduates: 35 (2010)
- Location: Gulshan-e-Iqbal Town, Karachi, Sindh, Pakistan
- Language: English
- Sister institution: Christ the King Seminary
- Degrees offered: Bachelor of Theology; Diploma in Theology

The National Catholic Institute of Theology (NCIT) is a Catholic theological institute established in Karachi, Pakistan in September 1997. It offers academic courses leading to a diploma in theology, as well as programs for laypeople and religious involved in Church ministries.

By studying at the Institute, students can obtain a Bachelor of Theology degree from the University of Melbourne due to the efforts of Yarra Theological Union and the Melbourne College of Divinity.

== History ==
It is located at the Christ the King Seminary which in 1997 was the only theological faculty in the country where seminarians and religious received their doctrinal and pastoral formation for the priesthood. When an urgent need was felt for a relevant and sound theological formation of the religious and clergy to build up and strengthen of the local Church, the Franciscans and Dominicans started serious reflection on the possibility of a second theological faculty which would also be open to lay men and women who wished to undertake degree or diploma theological studies or in-depth Biblical and Theological studies for their faith formation. The Catholic Bishops' Conference of Pakistan (CBCP) approved the idea of a National Institute to provide theological formation in the spirit of renewal desired by the Second Vatican Council, in keeping with theological principles and the challenges faced by the Church in the Asia.

== Organisation ==
All academic administration is the responsibility of Board of Governors which includes representatives of the Catholic Bishops’ Conference of Pakistan. It is a joint venture with collaboration among the Bishops and the religious orders, who also share responsibility. The Academic Staff emphasize special care to the deepening of theological education and formation in keeping with the changing realities which priests, religious and laity face. Now the study of theology is no longer an exclusive discipline accessible only to a privileged few. Every Christian man and woman can receive an appropriate spiritual and doctrinal formation. The Committee consisting of Sr. Margaret Madden rsm, Fr. Clement Waidyasekara omi, Fr. Arthur Charles and Fr. Pascal Robert ofm, was formed to prepare a Policy and Procedure Manual for NCIT. In 1998 the PPM was officially approved by the Board of Governors. For the first time in the history of the Catholic Church in Pakistan, a centre of theological learning opened for a wider participation of the laity, religious and clergy.

== Progress ==
In 2009 the first batch of students completed their degrees and diplomas. Fr. Paschal Robert OFM accepted the degrees and diplomas for the 9 BTheol and 6 Diploma of Ministry graduates at a graduation ceremony at the Melbourne College of Divinity in Australia.

In 2010 there were 35 students studying for their Bachelors in Theology degree at the NCIT.

In 2012 Fr Robert McCulloch, a former dean of the Institute, was awarded the Sitara-i-Quaid-i-Azam by President Asif Ali Zardari for his work in Pakistan.

On June 29, 2019 Pope Francis appointed Father Indrias Rehmat, of the Diocese of Faisalabad, at the time Dean of the National Catholic Institute of Theology, as Bishop of the Roman Catholic Diocese of Faisalabad. A new Dean has been appointed. It is Fr. Shabaz Nazir.

On November 3, 2020, 14 Diploma and 6 Certificate students graduated. Archbishop Emeritus Evarist Pinto was the chief guest.
