= St. Jude's Church, Karachi =

St. Jude's Church
- Location: North Nazimabad, Karachi
- Country: Pakistan
- Language(s): Urdu and English
- Denomination: Roman Catholic
- Tradition: Latin

History
- Founded: 1955
- Founder: Fr. Edouald OFM

Architecture
- Functional status: Active
- Groundbreaking: 1958

Administration
- Archdiocese: Archdiocese of Karachi

Clergy
- Archbishop: Cardinal Joseph Coutts

St. Jude's Church in the Roman Catholic Archdiocese of Karachi, is situated in North Nazimabad in Karachi, Pakistan.

== History ==
In 1951 Gabriel Indrias did a survey of 25 Catholic families living across the Lyari River from the Portiuncula Friary. Fr. Edouald OFM was the first parish priest. In August 1955 a house was acquired and a small church and school started functioning.

Four hundred and fifty families from Laluketh, Bara Maidan, Golimar, Peerabad, Siraj Colony and Jalalabad were included in the parish. Until 1958 most of the parishioners were Urdu-speaking.

In 1958 the Archdiocese acquired seven and a half acres of land in North Nazimabad. Jerome D'Silva and his partner Hussain undertook an innovative housing scheme of 400 houses, which became known as Hussain D'Silva Town. 175 English speaking families joined the parish in 1961.

== Parish priests ==
- Fr. Edouald OFM 1955 - 1968
- Fr Anthony D'Souza 1969 - 1970
- Fr Egidio Trindade 1970 - 1972
- Fr Anthony Martis 1974 - 1976
- Fr Gerry D'Souza 1976 - 1991
- Fr Peter John 1991 - 2001
- Fr Nazar Nawab 2001 -2009
- Fr Richard D'Souza 2009 -2013
- Fr Augustine Soares 2013 - 2019
- Fr. Cyril Nelson 2019 - 2020
- Fr. Mario Rodrigues 2020

== Persecution ==
On September 22, 1989, four Muslim teenagers desecrated and burgled the church.

On the evening of March 25, 2004, a crude incendiary device was lobbed into St. Dominic's Church in the congested Bara Maidan area of the parish. It caused little damage but left Christians feeling unsafe. Local authorities have provided security for the church and posted two constables on guard.

On 22 April 2009, armed men attacked a group of Christians in Taiser Town within the parish. They set ablaze six Christian houses and injured three Christians, including an 11-year-old boy, who died on 27 April in the hospital. According to AsiaNews Taiser Town is home to about 750 Christian families including 300 Catholic families. Fr Pervez Khalid, assistant Parish Priest at St Jude’s Parish, told AsiaNews that although no one was killed at that time, six people had received gunshot wounds.

== Current situation ==
The St. Jude's complex includes a parish house (presbetery), a Catholic high school and the St. Pius X Minor Seminary.

The St. Jude's educational center is run by Soldiers of Christ, the youth group at St. Jude's parish. A team of six teachers hold two-hour evening classes during the week, preparing under-privileged students for ninth- and 10th grade exams while charging just 400 rupees (US$5) a month for the service.

On July 18 and 19, 2009, flooding from torrential rains claimed 50 lives and injured another 100 in Karachi. 50 Catholic families of St. Jude's parish were also affected. They were given essential items and housing supplies and cement, gravel and concrete blocks to rebuild their houses.

Caritas Pakistan mitigated the effects of the 2008 financial crisis with its Livelihood Program. St. Jude’s Parish was selected to promote the kitchen gardening program at the household level ensuring the availability of fresh vegetables to families. Kitchen gardening awareness seminars and post cultivation methods of kitchen gardening were organized at Nasrat Nagar area of the parish in April, 2010.

In line with Pope Francis’ environmental encyclical, the students of the parish in August 2015, planted more than one thousand seeds of various trees, including Neem, Peepal, Siris and Conocarpus. This initiative was launched by Caritas Karachi with the support of the Karachi Social Forestry and Sindh Forest Department, “to save the planet from human and natural disasters, before the situation worsens".

Despite religious tensions in the country, in June 2019 the parish priest Fr. Soares hosted an iftar dinner for nearly two dozen Muslim Imams of different mosques and local leaders of several religious and political groups, to celebrate the holy month of Ramazan. In 2019 Soares also celebrated the golden jubilee of his ordination to the priesthood.

On 5 October 2019 the Archbishop announced that Fr. Cyril Nelson would be the new parish priest of the Parish.

The Parish was once again the host of an Iftar dinner for both Muslims and Christians held on April 10, 2022. Archbishop Benny Travas was one of the guests at the dinner hosted by Fr. Mario Rodrigues to promote inter-faith harmony.

== Security ==
For the last 25 years the Parish has had to employ security guards to protect church and worshippers against terrorist attacks.
