= Benny Mario Travas =

Pakistan Catholic prelate (born 1966)

His Grace Benny Mario Travas
- Archbishop of Karachi
- Church: Roman Catholic
- See: Karachi
- Installed: 11 April 2021
- Predecessor: Joseph Coutts
- Previous post: Bishop of Multan

Orders
- Ordination: 21 November 1990
- Consecration: 15 August 2015 by Ghaleb Moussa Abdalla Bader

Personal details
- Born: 21 November 1966 (age 59) Karachi, Pakistan

Benny Mario Travas (born 21 November 1966) is a Pakistani prelate of the Catholic Church and Archbishop of Karachi. He served as Bishop of Multan from 2015 to 2021.

== Biography ==
Travas was born in Karachi, Pakistan, on 21 November 1966. He received his early education from St. Patrick's High School, Karachi, where he graduated in 1983. He graduated from the Christ the King seminary and was ordained a priest of the Archdiocese of Karachi on 7 December 1990 and then spent seven years in pastoral work.

In 1997, Travas received a licentiate in canon law from the Pontifical Urban University in Rome. On his return to Pakistan he was professor of canon law at the National Catholic Institute of Theology, rector of St. Pius X Minor Seminary in Karachi, and Vicar-General of the Archdiocese of Karachi. He was also a judge of the Ecclesiastical Tribunal of Karachi and a member of the College of Consultors and of the Priests' Council. He was Vice President of the Catholic Board of Education.

On 13 June 2014, Pope Francis accepted the resignation of Bishop Andrew Francis of Multan and appointed Travas as Apostolic Administrator. On 29 May 2015, Pope Francis appointed Travas Bishop of Multan. He received his episcopal consecration on 15 August 2015 from Archbishop Ghaleb Moussa Abdalla Bader, Apostolic Nuncio to Pakistan.

In 2016, Travas was appointed Chair of Caritas Pakistan. In December 2016, at a meeting of Asian bishops, he described the principal challenges facing the Catholic Church in Pakistan as charges brought under the blasphemy laws and mob violence, as well as poverty, drug addiction, and the shortage of priests.

In October 2016, Travas was appointed a member of the Congregation for Divine Worship and the Discipline of the Sacraments. In February 2019, he was elected secretary of the International Commission on English in the Liturgy.

On 13 June 2020, Travas inaugurated St. Peter's CSS Academy in Multan. The Academy encourages and facilitates Catholics to appear for the Central Superior Services (CSS) exams that lead to federal public service jobs. This is the first time a concerted effort has been made to promote Catholics into the public service.

In 2020, Travas went into isolation after he tested positive for COVID-19.

On 11 February 2021, Pope Francis appointed Travas to succeed Joseph Coutts as Archbishop of Karachi. Travas was installed as Archbishop of Karachi at the St Patrick's Cathedral on 11 April 2021.

On October 16, 2023, Archbishop Christophe Zakhia El-Kassis (Apostolic Nuncio to Pakistan) acted as the special envoy appointed by Pope Francis to confer the sacred pallium upon Archbishop Travas, of the Metropolitan Archdiocese of Karachi.

Catholic Church titles
| Preceded by Andrew Francis | Bishop of Multan; May 2015 – 2021 | Succeeded by Yousaf Sohan |
| Preceded by Joseph Coutts | Archbishop of Karachi; Archbishop-elect | Succeeded by - |
