= John Joseph (bishop) =

Pakistani Catholic bishop

The Right Reverend John Joseph
- Bishop of Faisalabad
- Church: Roman Catholic
- Diocese: Faisalabad
- In office: 1984–1998
- Predecessor: Paolo Vieri Andreotti
- Successor: Joseph Coutts
- Previous post: Auxiliary Bishop of Faisalabad (1981-1984)

Orders
- Ordination: 18 January 1960
- Consecration: 9 January 1981 by Joseph Cordeiro

Personal details
- Born: 15 November 1932 Khushpur, Pakistan
- Died: 6 May 1998 (aged 65)

John Joseph (15 November 1932 – 6 May 1998) was a Pakistani Catholic prelate who served as Bishop of Faisalabad from 1984 until his death in 1998. He committed suicide to protest the cruel treatment of Christians in Pakistan.

== Life ==
John Joseph was born in Khushpur, Pakistan. He received his religious education at the Christ the King Seminary in Karachi and was ordained in Faisalabad on 18 January 1960. After completing a doctorate he went on to serve on the faculty of the Christ the King Seminary. On 24 October 1980 he was appointed Auxiliary Bishop of Faisalabad and ordained a bishop on 9 January 1981. On 9 January 1984 he became Bishop of Faisalabad. He committed suicide by shooting himself on 6 May 1998, in protest at the execution of a Christian man on trumped-up blasphemy charges by Muslims in Pakistan.

== After death ==
Three new publications on Joseph have been published since the bishop's death. "A Peaceful Struggle" is a compilation of the bishop's writings on matters related to justice and peace. The 197-page book was compiled by the Faisalabad diocesan human rights office, led by Father Khalid Rashid Asi. A translation of the English-language book into Urdu has also been published. The third book, "Sermons in Blood", is a 110-page book written by labor activist Gulzar Wafa Chaudhry. Chaudhry attempts to keep alive the revolutionary spirit Joseph tried to initiate in protest at the situation of Christians and other religious minority communities in Pakistan.

A film showing Joseph's struggles for minority rights was screened at the South Asian film festival in Kathmandu October 4–7, 2001. The 45-minute documentary "A Sun Sets in" was produced by Waseem Anthony and showed the life of the late Bishop, the first Punjabi bishop, and his struggle for Pakistani Catholics.

The Bishop John Joseph Memorial Hall in Darulaloom Jamia Rehmania madrassa in Faisalabad, was inaugurated on March 31, 2007. Bishop Joseph Coutts was present during the opening. No other Islamic seminary in the country has a building named after a Catholic priest.

On Joseph's advice, Aftab Alexander Mughal and Peter Jacob wrote a book, Section 295 C, Pakistan Penal Code – Study of the History, Effects and Cases under Blasphemy Laws in Pakistan, which was published in 1995.
