= Mervyn Cardoza =

Brigadier Mervyn Adrian Cardoza
- Born: 1922; British India
- Died: 17 November 2010 (aged 87–88); Toronto, Ontario, Canada
- Relatives: sons – Chris, Bruce and Geof
- Military career
- Allegiance: Pakistan
- Branch: Pakistan Army
- Rank: Brigadier
- Unit: 13th Lancers
- Commands: 5th Armoured Brigade; Director Logistics
- Conflicts: Indo-Pakistani War of 1965
- Awards: Tamgha-e-Khidmat

Brigadier Mervyn Adrian Cardoza (1922 – 17 November 2010) was a one-star general in the Pakistan Army. In 1965, Cardoza was awarded the Tamgha-e-Khidmat by President Ayub Khan for Indo-Pakistani War of 1965.

== Background and family ==
He was first educated at St Patrick's High School, Karachi. Cardoza attended St. George's College, Mussoorie from where he graduated in 1944. He had three sons, Chris, Bruce and Geof. He had nine grandchildren.

== Career ==
Following graduation, he joined the Army, and at the time of partition opted to serve in the Pakistan Army.

He quickly moved up the ranks until retiring at the rank of Brigadier.

Cardoza, who was commanding 5 Armoured Brigade until 1970, left to take over the new post of Director Logistics in 1971.

After retiring from the Army he migrated to Canada.

== Death ==
Cardoza died in Toronto on 17 November 2010. A funeral mass was celebrated on 20 November at Holy Spirit Catholic Church, Toronto.
