= Bonaventure Patrick Paul =

His Grace Bonaventure Patrick Paul OFM
- Bishop of Roman Catholic Diocese of Hyderabad (Emeritus)
- Church: Roman Catholic
- See: Roman Catholic Diocese of Hyderabad
- In office: 1967 – 1990
- Predecessor: James Cornelius van Miltenburg, O.F.M. †
- Successor: Joseph Coutts
- Previous posts: Administrator, Roman Catholic Diocese of Hyderabad

Orders
- Ordination: 1 March 1954
- Consecration: 14 Jun 1971 by Archbishop Joseph Cordeiro; Bishop Francesco Benedetto Cialeo, O.P. Bishop Nicholas Hettinga, M.H.M.

Personal details
- Born: 26 March 1929 Karachi, British India (now in Pakistan)
- Died: 18 January 2007 (aged 77)

Bonaventure Patrick Paul OFM† (26 March 1929, Karachi - 18 January 2007) was a former Bishop of Hyderabad, Pakistan.

== Career ==
He received his early education at St Patrick's High School, Karachi. He received his religious training under the Order of Friars Minor at the Portiuncula Friary in Karachi, and was ordained a priest in Karachi on 1 March 1954.

In March 1961 Fr. Bonaventure was posted to St. Jude's Parish, in Karachi, where he served until 1966.

In 1967 Pope Paul VI appointed him Apostolic Administrator of the Roman Catholic Diocese of Hyderabad. On 14 June 1971 he was consecrated Bishop.

He resigned as the Bishop of Hyderabad in 1990. He then dedicated himself to education through speaking at events like a Basic Christian Formation Course organised by the Catechetical Centre, Karachi, and social justice issues.

From 1998–2001 he was chairman of the Pakistan bishops' National Commission for Justice and Peace.

Bishop Paul died on 18 January 2007.
