= Joseph Coutts =

Pakistani Catholic cardinal

His Eminence Joseph Coutts HI
- Cardinal, Archbishop emeritus of Karachi
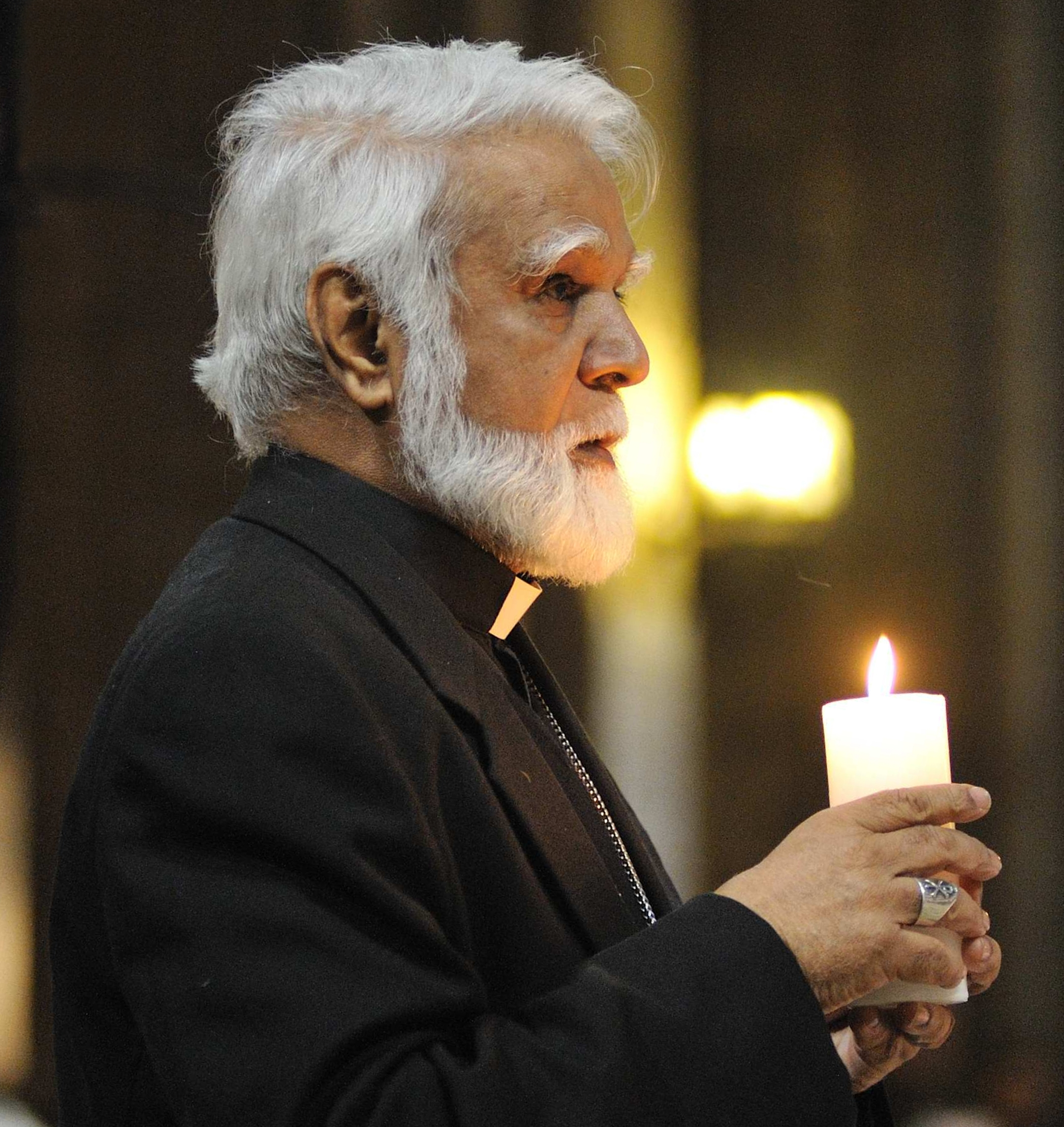
- Coutts in 2016
- Church: Catholic Church
- Archdiocese: Karachi
- Appointed: 25 January 2012
- Term ended: 11 April 2021
- Predecessor: Evarist Pinto
- Successor: Benny Mario Travas
- Other post: Cardinal Priest of San Bonaventura da Bagnoregio (2018–present)
- Previous posts: Coadjutor Bishop of Hyderabad (1988–1990); Bishop of Hyderabad (1990–1998); Bishop of Faisalabad (1998–2012)

Orders
- Ordination: 9 January 1971 by Felicissimus Alphonse Raeymaeckers
- Consecration: 16 September 1988 by Bonaventure Patrick Paul
- Created cardinal: 28 June 2018 by Pope Francis
- Rank: Cardinal priest

Personal details
- Born: 21 July 1945 (age 81) Amritsar, British India
- Parents: Pedro Jose Couto
- Education: St. Anthony High School, Lahore
- Motto: Harmony
- Signature: Joseph Coutts's signature

Styles of Joseph Coutts
- Reference style: His Eminence
- Spoken style: Your Eminence
- Religious style: Cardinal
- Informal style: Cardinal
- See: Karachi

Ordination history of Joseph Coutts
History
Priestly ordination
- Ordained by: Felicissimus Alphonse Raeymaeckers
- Date: 9 January 1971
Episcopal consecration
- Principal consecrator: Bonaventure Patrick Paul
- Co-consecrators: Armando Trindade; Emanuele Gerada
- Date: 16 September 1988
- Place: Sacred Heart Cathedral, Lahore
Cardinalate
- Elevated by: Pope Francis
- Date: 28 June 2018

Joseph Coutts (born 21 July 1945) is a Pakistani prelate of the Catholic Church, who served as Archbishop of Karachi from 2012 to 2021. He served as Bishop of Faisalabad from 1998 to 2012.

Pope Francis made Coutts a cardinal on 28 June 2018.

== Biography ==
Coutts was born in Amritsar, British India, on 21 July 1945 in a Goan family. His father Pedro Jose Couto was from Aldona, a village in North Goa, and the family's home was at Ucassaim. Anil Joseph Thomas Couto, Archbishop of Delhi, is his first cousin. Coutts can speak several languages including English, Italian, German, French, Urdu, Punjabi and Sindhi. He received his religious training at the Christ the King seminary in Karachi and was ordained a priest in Lahore, Pakistan, on 9 January 1971.

After ordination, he completed ecclesiastical studies in Rome from 1973 to 1976 and then became professor of philosophy and sociology at Christ the King Regional Seminary, Karachi, rector of St. Mary's Minor Seminary, Lahore, and diocesan vicar general from 1986 to 1988.

On 5 May 1988 he was appointed Coadjutor Bishop of Hyderabad in Pakistan by Pope John Paul II and consecrated a bishop on 16 September. He chose as his episcopal motto the word Harmony. He became Bishop of Hyderabad on 1 September 1990. On 27 June 1998 he was appointed Bishop of Faisalabad.

Coutts is the longtime Chairman of Caritas Pakistan and directed its earthquake relief efforts in 2005.

In Faisalabad he developed ties with Muslim scholars and clerics. The Catholic University of Eichstätt-Ingolstadt, Germany, awarded Bishop Coutts the 2007 Shalom Prize for his commitment to interfaith dialogue in Pakistan. For 25 years, the award has been given to people and projects working for human rights.

On 25 January 2012, Pope Benedict XVI appointed Bishop Coutts as Archbishop of Karachi to succeed Archbishop Evarist Pinto. Anticipating his return to the city where he had studied and taught, he stressed the challenges posed by the city's refugee-driven population explosion and the "sporadic bursts of violence and terrorism" that had become a feature of life in Karachi.

In both Faisalabad and Karachi, he has campaigned against Pakistan's blasphemy law, which he believes is too easily manipulated for personal attacks or to target religious minorities for insubstantial or pretended offenses. In Karachi he has established multiple connections for inter-religious dialog between Muslims and Catholics, aiming at both acceptance by the general population and increased understanding on the part of political and religious leaders.

Coutts was hospitalized with pneumonia and unable to travel to Rome to receive his pallium, the symbol of his status as a metropolitan archbishop, from Pope Benedict in June 2012.

He was president of the Pakistan Catholic Bishops' Conference from 2011 to 2017. Pope Francis created Coutts a cardinal priest in the consistory of 28 June 2018, assigning him the titular church of San Bonaventura da Bagnoregio. He became the country's second cardinal after Joseph Cordeiro (1918–1994) who was also of Goan origin.

He is a member of the Pontifical Council for Interreligious Dialogue.

On 9 January 2021, he celebrated 50 years of his priestly ordination by celebrating Mass at St Patrick's Cathedral. His resignation as Archbishop of Karachi was accepted on 11 February 2021.

On 14 August 2024, the President of Pakistan awarded Coutts the Hilal-i-Imtiaz.

He participated as a cardinal elector in the 2025 papal conclave that elected Pope Leo XIV.

== See also ==
- Catholic Church in Pakistan
- Cardinals created by Francis

Catholic Church titles
Preceded by Bonaventure Patrick Paul	Bishop of Hyderabad; 1 September 1990 – 27 June 1998	Succeeded by Max John Rodrigues
Preceded by John Joseph	Bishop of Faisalabad; 27 June 1998 – 25 January 2012	Succeeded by Joseph Arshad
Preceded by Evarist Pinto	Archbishop of Karachi; 25 January 2012 – 11 April 2021	Succeeded by Benny Mario Travas
New title	Cardinal-Priest of San Bonaventura da Bagnoregio; 28 June 2018 – present	Succeeded by Incumbent
