= Evarist Pinto =

Pakistani archbishop

His Grace Evarist Pinto
- Archbishop Emeritus of Karachi
- Church: Roman Catholic Church
- See: Karachi
- In office: 2004 – 2012
- Predecessor: Simeon Anthony Pereira
- Successor: Joseph Coutts
- Previous post: Archbishop of Karachi

Orders
- Ordination: 6 January 1968 by Joseph Cordeiro
- Consecration: 25 April 2000 by Alessandro D'Errico
- Rank: Archbishop

Personal details
- Born: 31 December 1933 (age 92) Goa, Portuguese India
- Education: St. Pius X Minor Seminary, Christ the King Seminary, Pontifical Urban University, Pontifical Biblical Institute

Evarist Pinto (born 31 December 1933 in Goa, Portuguese India) is the former archbishop of Karachi, Pakistan.

== Education ==
He was educated at St. Thomas High School, Goa, India. In 1960 he started studying for priesthood at the St. Pius X Minor Seminary in Quetta. He continued his religious training at the Christ the King Seminary in Karachi, where he was ordained a priest on 6 January 1968. He is fluent in 10 languages including English, Urdu, Punjabi, Hebrew, Greek, Latin, Italian, German, French and Konkani.

== Career ==
Father Pinto taught Sacred Scripture at Christ the King Seminary and from 1987 to 1993 was pastor of St. Lawrence’s Church, Karachi.

He obtained a doctorate in biblical theology at the Urbanian University, Rome, and a master's degree in sacred scripture at the "Biblicum". On 17 February 2000 he was appointed Auxiliary Bishop of Karachi by Pope John Paul II. He became Archbishop of Karachi on 5 January 2004 on the retirement of the incumbent Archbishop Simeon Anthony Pereira. The seat of the Archdiocese of Karachi is at Saint Patrick's Cathedral, Karachi. He selected as his motto "Preach the Good News to the Poor".

On 30 April 2006 the Archdiocese attended the first-ever Catholic film screened in Pakistan. It was presented as "a historical moment" to the 450 guests at the premier of Muhjza [Miracle], held in St Paul's Parish, Azam Basti.

In April 2008 Pinto performed the groundbreaking on the 2,044 square meter site of the new St. Pius X Minor Seminary.

The 12th General Ordinary Assembly of the Synod of Bishops took place in Rome from 5–26 October 2008. Archbishop Pinto represented the Catholic Bishops' Conference of Pakistan at the Synod.

In July 2011, Pinto attended the ground-breaking ceremony for the new St. John Marie Vianney Church in St Paul's Parish, Azam Basti. The Archdiocese plans to construct five new Churches in 2011.

On 25 January 2012, Archbishop Pinto resigned after reaching the age of 75. Pope Benedict XVI appointed Bishop Joseph Coutts of Faisalabad as his replacement.

== Post-retirement ==
After retirement Pinto spends much of his time writing books on Catholicism. He is the author of 31 books in English and many of these have been translated into Urdu.
