= Roman Catholic Archdiocese of Karachi =

Roman Catholic archdiocese in Pakistan

Archdiocese of Karachi Archidioecesis Karachiensis اسقف اعظم کراچی
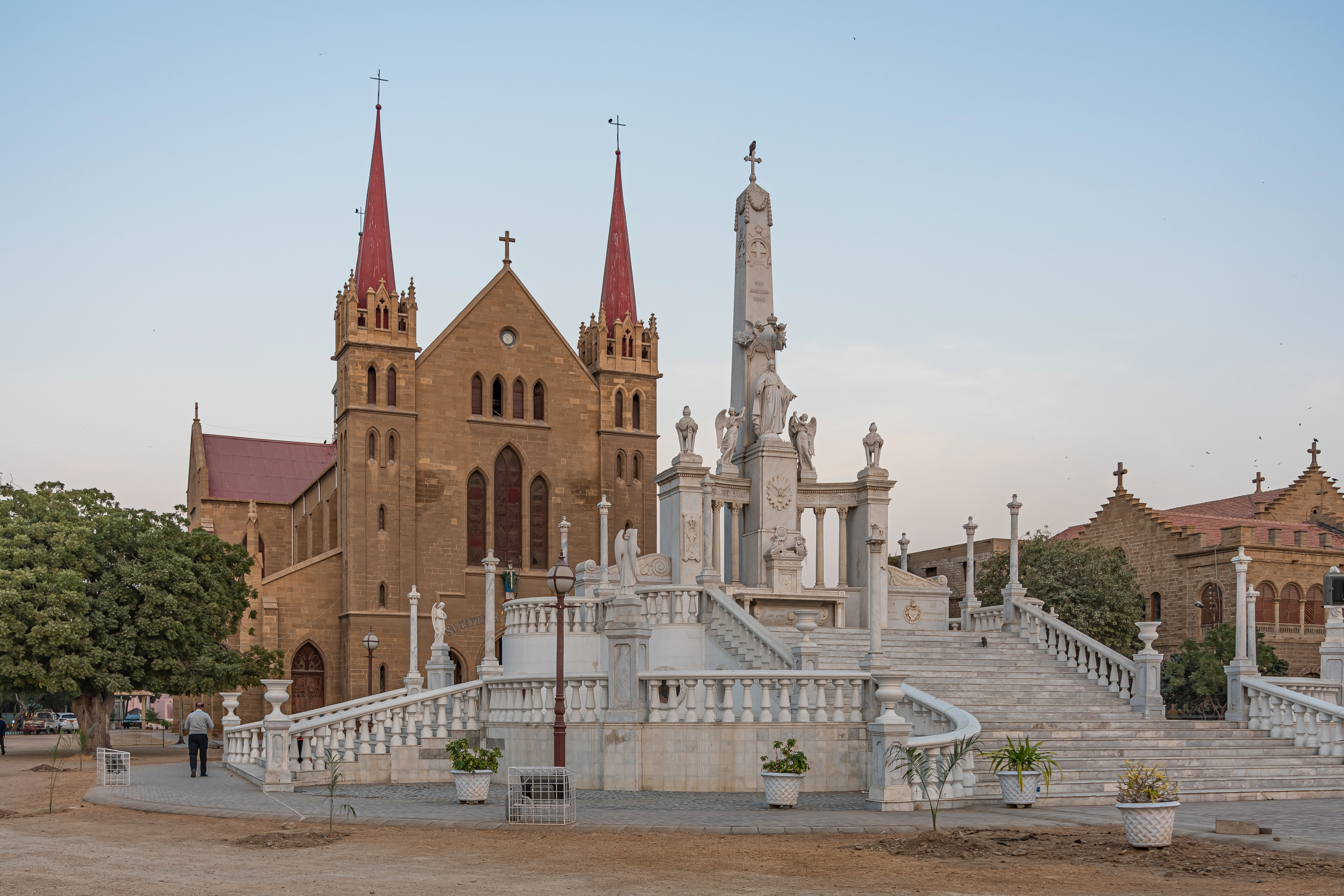
- St. Patrick's Cathedral

Location
- Country: Pakistan
- Territory: The city of Karachi with its five districts: Karachi Central, South, West, East and Malir.
- Ecclesiastical province: Karachi
- Coordinates: 24°51′43″N 67°2′6″E

Statistics
- Area: 180,000 km^{2} (69,000 sq mi)
- Population: Total; Catholics: (as of 2013); 18,371,000; 166,000 (0.9%)

Information
- Denomination: Catholic Church
- Sui iuris church: Latin Church
- Rite: Roman Rite
- Established: 1948; 78 years ago
- Cathedral: St. Patrick's Cathedral

Current leadership
- Pope: Leo XIV
- Metropolitan Archbishop: Benny Mario Travas
- Suffragans: Diocese of Hyderabad
- Bishops emeritus: Evarist Pinto, Joseph Coutts

Map
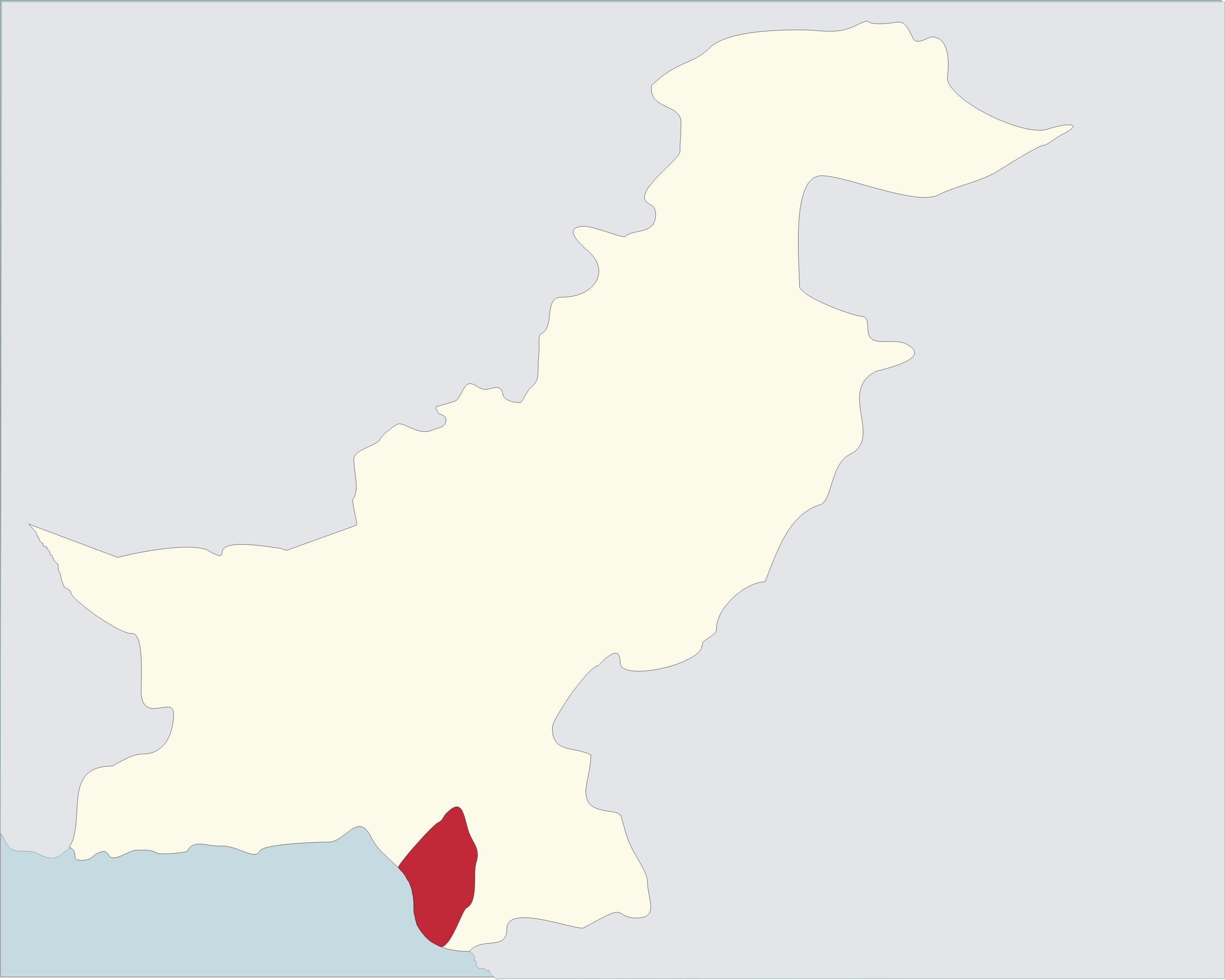

The Archdiocese of Karachi is a Latin Church ecclesiastical territory or archdiocese of the Catholic Church in Pakistan. It was erected on 20 May 1948 under as a then-suffragan diocese in the ecclesiastical province of the metropolitan Archdiocese of Bombay.

== History ==
The Augustinians were the first to start a mission in the village of Kolachi in the 17th century. They were followed by the Discalced Carmelites who worked in the area until 1672. Around 1842–1843, the Carmelites once again attended to the spiritual needs of the British troops. The Capuchin order served from 1852 and then the Jesuits from 1856 to 1934. On 1 June 1934, it was declared a Mission under the Franciscans. It was elevated as the Archdiocese of Karachi on 15 July 1950 when the priests of the Archdiocese took over the management from the Franciscans.

== Development ==
The seat of the Archdiocese is St. Patrick's Cathedral. The Christ the King seminary, the major seminary of the country is located in the Archdiocese.

The Archdiocese has contributed to the welfare of the country through its schools, hospitals, orphanages and other institutions. In 1998, the Archdiocese of Karachi owned 17 English- and 46 Urdu-medium schools for some 40,000 students with about 1,700 teachers.

The Archdiocese has also produced a religious order for women known as the Franciscan Missionaries of Christ the King (FMCK) that founded schools, orphanages, homes for the aged and disabled and hospitals throughout the country and in India and Sri Lanka.

The Archdiocese publishes an Urdu-language weekly newspaper Agahi (knowledge) and an English-language weekly newspaper The Christian Voice, Karachi.

The Archdiocese celebrated its Golden Jubilee on 20 May 1998.

In 2000, the archdiocese had 18 parishes, 15 in the city of Karachi and one each in mission stations at Kotri, Khuzdar and Larkana. In 2009, the Archdiocese had 145 thousand faithful in a population of 15 million people.

Encouraged by Pope Benedict XVI's message for the World Day of Social Communications, wherein he affirms that "digital technologies are a gift for humanity that can be useful for spreading solidarity and understanding among people and populations", the Archdiocese launched a web-based television network Good News TV in February 2009. Father Arthur Charles, the Vicar General, is the CEO of Good News TV.

On 11 December 2009 the Archdiocese lost its longest serving priest when Father D'Arcy D'Souza, 97, died in Holy Family Hospital. Fr. D'Arcy gave sixty six years of his life in the service of the Church.

In June 2018 Pope Francis made Archbishop Coutts a cardinal priest, assigning him the titular church of San Bonaventura da Bagnoregio.

On 28 May 2023, the Archdiocese of Karachi celebrated the 75th anniversary of its establishment. More than eight thousand people attended the Mass concelebrated by Archbishop Benny Travas of Karachi, Archbishop Joseph Arshad of Islamabad-Rawalpindi, Bishop Indrias Rehmat of Faisalabad and Bishop Yousaf Sohan of Multan and many priests.

== Archbishops of Karachi ==
- James Cornelius van Miltenburg, O.F.M. (1948–1958)
- Cardinal Joseph Marie Anthony Cordeiro (1958–1994)
- Simeon Anthony Pereira (1994–2002)
- Evarist Pinto (2004–2012)
- Cardinal Joseph Coutts (2012–2021)
- Benny Mario Travas (2021–present)

== Churches in the diocese ==
- Saint Patrick's Cathedral
- Saint Michael's Church, Manzoor Colony
- Our Lady of Fatima Church
- St. Jude's Church
- St Paul’s Church, Azam Basti - St Paul's Parish
- St. Lawrence’s Church
- Sacred Heart Church, Keamari
- St. Anthony’s Church
- St. Francis’ Church
- St. John’s Church, Drigh Road
- St. Luke’s Church, Baldia
- Christ the King Church
- St. Peter’s Church, Akhter Colony
- Saint Francis of Assisi Parish, Old Haji Camp
- St John Marie Vianney Church, Mehmoodabad

=== Saint Francis of Assisi Parish, Karachi ===
The Saint Francis of Assisi Parish, located on Siddiq Wahab Road in the Old Haji Camp area, is a part of the Archdiocese.

The first parish priest, from July 1941 – 1944, was Fr. Liberius Pieterse. He later became known for his translation of the Bible into Urdu. For nearly 80 years, parish nuns have maintained a medical clinic and school for poor Pakistanis.

During the mid-1950s Fr. Simeon Anthony Pereira was appointed Parish Priest of the parish. Fr. Simeon went on to become the Archbishop of Karachi

The parish also has a school attached to it.

St. Francis was the first parish to cater to the many people migrating from Punjab province to the city. The Jesuits and the Franciscan Missionaries of Christ the King nuns started the migrant mission which still continues as Catholics pour in from the provinces.

==== Attack ====
On 12 October 2012, the parish was attacked by a mob of 600 Islamic radicals that destroyed property in the yard, but failed to break down the front door. Saleem Khurshid Khokhar, a member of the Sindh Provincial Assembly, visited shortly after the attack and condemned violence against religious minorities.

== In the media ==
The Archdiocese promotes the message of the Gospel through the following media:

- The Christian Voice, an English weekly
- Agahi, an Urdu news weekly
- Good News TV, the Archdiocese satellite television network
- Catholics in Pakistan, the official website of Catholics in Pakistan

== See also ==
- List of Roman Catholic dioceses in Pakistan
