= Joseph Cordeiro =

Pakistani Catholic prelate

His Eminence Joseph Cordeiro
- Cardinal; Archbishop of Karachi
- Church: Roman Catholic Church
- Archdiocese: Karachi
- See: Karachi
- Elected: 7 May 1958
- In office: 11 February 1994
- Predecessor: James Cornelius van Miltenburg O.F.M.
- Successor: Simeon Anthony Pereira
- Other post: Cardinal-Priest of Sant'Andrea delle Fratte (1973-94)
- Previous post: President of the Catholic Bishops' Conference of Pakistan (1958-1994)

Orders
- Ordination: 24 August 1946
- Consecration: 7 May 1958 by Archbishop James Cornelius van Miltenburg, O.F.M.
- Created cardinal: 5 March 1973 by Pope Paul VI
- Rank: Cardinal-Priest

Personal details
- Born: Joseph Marie Anthony Cordeiro; 19 January 1918 Bombay, Bombay Presidency, British India
- Died: 11 February 1994 (aged 76) Holy Family Hospital, Karachi
- Buried: Saint Patrick's Cathedral, Karachi; 24.8619°N 67.0349°E
- Denomination: Roman Catholic
- Residence: Karachi
- Parents: Dr. Peter Cordeiro^{(Father)} Elvine Cordeiro^{(Mother)}
- Education: Master of Arts
- Alma mater: St Patrick's High School, Karachi. University of Bombay. Oxford University.
- Motto: Omnia Omnibus^{Latin} All for everyone^{English}
- Coat of arms: Joseph Cordeiro's coat of arms

Styles of Joseph Marie Anthony Cordeiro
- Reference style: His Eminence
- Spoken style: Your Eminence
- Religious style: Cardinal
- Informal style: Cardinal
- See: Karachi

Ordination history of Joseph Cordeiro
History
Priestly ordination
- Date: 24 August 1946
Episcopal consecration
- Principal consecrator: Archbishop James Cornelius van Miltenburg, O.F.M.
- Co-consecrators: Bishop Francesco Benedetto Cialeo, O.P. , Bishop Leonard Joseph Raymond
- Date: 24 August 1958
Cardinalate
- Elevated by: Pope Paul VI
- Date: 5 March 1973
Episcopal succession
Bishops consecrated by Joseph Cordeiro as principal consecrator
- Bishop Bonaventure Patrick Paul, O.F.M.: 14 June 1971
- Bishop John Joseph: 9 January 1981
- Bishop Anthony Theodore Lobo: 1 October 1982

Joseph Marie Anthony Cordeiro (19 January 1918 – 11 February 1994) was a Catholic prelate who in 1973 became the first Pakistani cardinal.

== Early life ==
Cordeiro was born to a Goan family which hailed from the village of Salvador do Mundo in Goa. He was educated at St Patrick's High School, Karachi, the University of Bombay and Oxford University. He received his religious training at the Papal Seminary in Kandy, Sri Lanka, and was ordained a priest in Karachi, Pakistan on 24 August 1946.

== Career ==
From 1946 to 1948, he did pastoral work in Hyderabad and Karachi.

He then attended Oxford University, where he earned a Master of Arts degree.

In 1950 he was appointed Vice Principal of St Patrick's High School, Karachi. From 1952 he served as principal of St Francis Grammar School in Quetta and as rector of the St. Pius X Minor Seminary in Quetta. On 7 May 1958, he was appointed Archbishop of Karachi, with his seat at Saint Patrick's Cathedral, Karachi.

He attended the Second Vatican Council (1962–1965), the First Ordinary Assembly of the Synod of Bishops, Vatican City (1967), the First Extraordinary Assembly of the Synod of Bishops, Vatican City (1969) and the Second Ordinary Assembly of the Synod of Bishops, Vatican City (1971). He was elected a member of the Council of the General Secretariat of the Synod of Bishops (1971).

He was the first Pakistani cardinal, a position elevated by Pope Paul VI (1973). He attended both papal conclaves in 1978, and was mentioned as papabile by Time Magazine after Pope John Paul I's death.

He wrote a series of articles for the Archdiocesan weekly Christian Voice called "Lessons of a Lifetime", a reflection on his life experiences.

From 1958 until his death, Cordeiro was president of the Catholic Bishops' Conference of Pakistan.

He was also since 1972 the secretary of the Federation of Asian Bishops' Conferences.

== Death ==
Cordeiro died on 11 February 1994 at Holy Family Hospital with complications due to cancer. Cordeiro was succeeded by Archbishop Simeon Anthony Pereira.

== Honors ==
Cordeiro was honoured by the Christ the King Seminary in Karachi that has hosted the Cardinal Cordeiro Cricket tournament to promote religious vocations since 2008.

On 6 May 2011, The Old Patricians (former students of St Patrick's school) presented the Joseph Cardinal Cordeiro Gold Medal to the top student from the Cambridge A level section at the closing ceremony of the 150th anniversary of the school.

In 2012, Cardinal Cordeiro High School was named in his honor. The school is located in the Good Shepherd Parish in Korangi Town, Karachi.

His alma mater, St. Patrick's High School named the Cardinal Cordeiro Silver Jubilee Auditorium in his honor.
