= Lemmens =

Lemmens is a Dutch patronymic surname derived from "Lambert's son". The name is particularly popular in Belgian Limburg where it is the ninth most common last name. Notable people with the surname include:

- Alfons Lemmens (1919–2013), Dutch footballer
- An Lemmens (born 1980), Belgian presenter
- Erwin Lemmens (born 1976), Belgian professional soccer player
- Gertrude Lemmens (1914–2000), Dutch Roman Catholic sister and missionary
- Helen Lemmens (1834–1906), English soprano, wife of Jacques-Nicolas Lemmens
- Jacques-Nicolas Lemmens (1823–1881), Flemish composer and organist
- Jean-Nicolas Lemmens (1850–1897), Dutch Catholic priest and Canadian bishop
- Leon Lemmens (1954–2017), Belgian Roman Catholic auxiliary bishop
- Salesius Lemmens (1904–1942), Dutch Apostolic Prefect of the Order of Friars Minor
- Sean Lemmens (born 1994), Australian rules footballer
- Stacy Lemmens (1998–2006), Belgian murder victim
- Steve Lemmens (1972–2016), Belgian snooker player

Lemmen:

- Celina Lemmen (born 1985), Dutch swimmer
- Georges Lemmen (1865–1916), Belgian neo-impressionist painter

== See also ==
- Lemmens Institute or Lemmensinstituut, a Belgian conservatory in Leuven
- Leroy Lamis (1925–2010), American sculptor whose family name originally was Lemmens
