= Franciscan Missionaries of Christ the King =

Roman Catholic religious congregation

The Franciscan Missionaries of Christ the King (F.M.C.K.) is a Roman Catholic religious congregation for women that originated in what is now Pakistan and founded schools, orphanages, homes for the aged and disabled and hospitals throughout the country. They are distinct from the Franciscan Sisters of Christ the King in the United States.

== History ==
The congregation was founded in 1937 by Bridget Sequeira (a native of Saligao, North Goa, then part of Portuguese India) in Karachi, which was a part of British India. Bridget Sequeira founded this congregation in collaboration with Salesius Lemmens who was a native from Holland.

The congregation chose a white sari with a border of three red lines printed along the edge. The three border lines represented the three vows of chastity, poverty and obedience that the religious sisters make.

A prospectus of the congregation was published by the Rotti Press in 1948.

The congregation celebrated its platinum jubilee on July 28, 2012, when Joseph Coutts, the Archbishop of Karachi presided at a Mass for the sisters. In India, the Platinum Jubilee Celebration took place in May 2012 where around 120 Sisters came together in Old Goa for five days prayer, reflection and sharing. The Eucharistic Celebration was presided over by Archbishop Filipe Neri Ferrao. The congregation has grown to around 300 sisters.

== Apostolate ==
The sisters are engaged in educational, pastoral, health and social work. Concern for the rights of the poor will be their main thrust.

=== Pakistan ===
The sisters played an important role in the formation of Saint Francis of Assisi Parish, Karachi in 1936.

On 19 May 1943 the sisters took charge of the Seth Mulchand Municipal Maternity Home on Britto Road. The sisters administered the maternity home efficiently for over thirty-five years. The sisters opened a chapel dedicated to St. Clare, and daily Mass was attended by residents of Soldier Bazaar and Catholic Colony. After Independence the sisters visited the Catholic residents of Soldier Bazaar regularly, teaching catechism and preparing children for the sacraments. They visited the sick and the aged of Soldier Bazaar and Catholic Colony, administering medication and checking blood pressure. They relinquished their charge of the home on 18 April 1979.

Darul Sukun in Karachi, a home for children and adults with physical and mental disabilities, was founded and is run by the sisters. On March 23, 1989 Gertrude Lemmens received the Sitara-i-Quaid-i-Azam award in recognition of her work at Darul Sukun and for founding other homes for the physically and mentally handicapped, the aged and homeless. Since 2000 Ruth Lewis has been in charge of the institution.

Mathilda Pereira joined the congregation in 1944. In 1968 she was appointed the mother general of the order and served for three six-year terms.

The congregation is also active within the Roman Catholic Diocese of Hyderabad where Nasreen Daniel serves on the Justice and Peace Commission.

In 2010 in Pakistan there were 61 sisters still working in their various homes and ministries. Since 1960 they have also been managing the St. Vincent's Home for the Aged in Karachi, built by the Society of St Vincent de Paul.

The congregation also has a school near the tomb of Muhammad Ali Jinnah in Karachi. Catherine Wilson is the principal.

=== India ===
Shortly after its founding, Sequeira traveled back to her native region with some companions from her new congregation, and established the congregation there. It has since spread to various remote parts of India. The congregation also helped to train the first of the Poor Sisters of Our Lady, a congregation founded in Mumbai, India, in 1939.

The mother house of the order is located in Old Goa, Goa.

=== Sri Lanka ===
In 2006, four sisters started working in Sri Lanka.

== Administration ==
Due to the increasing numbers of members and apostolates spread through various regions of India, Pakistan and Sri Lanka, a need was felt to decentralize the administration for better efficiency and organization. During its 10th General Chapter held in 2005, the congregation decided to divide its administration into two provinces: the Province of St Francis of Assisi in Pakistan and St. Clare's Province in India. The Province in India consists of the Archdiocese of Goa and Daman, Archdiocese of Mumbai, Dioceses of Vasai and Pune.

Fatima Rodrigues was elected as the new superior general of the congregation in June, 2016, at their generalate in Old Goa. There are 174 sisters working in remote areas all over India. In 2020, there are almost 200 sisters working in different states in India.

A formation house (a centre of learning for women who wish to enter the congregation) and generalate (centre of administration) for the Franciscan Missionaries of Christ the King was constructed in Old Goa in 2005. It consists of classrooms, dormitories, refectory with kitchen and a chapel in a two-story building.

== Notable members ==
- Bridget Sequeira
- Gertrude Lemmens
- Ruth Lewis
