= Nawab Haider Naqvi =

Pakistani economist and scholar (1935–2024)

Syed Nawab Haider Naqvi (11 July 1935 – 7 July 2024) was a Pakistani economist and scholar.

== Early life and education ==
Syed Nawab Haider Naqvi was born in Meerut, British India on 11 July 1935. He migrated to Karachi, Pakistan in 1950.

He received his master's degree from Yale University in 1961 and his doctorate from Princeton University in 1966. He was a post-doctoral research fellow at Harvard University from 1969–1970.

== Career ==
Naqvi served as the director of the Pakistan Institute of Development Economics from 1979 to 1995. He also served as a senior economic advisor for the National Electric Power Regulatory Authority (NEPRA) and a Higher Education Commission of Pakistan Distinguished National Professor and director general at Federal Urdu University, Islamabad.

== Death ==
Naqvi died on 7 July 2024, at the age of 88.

== Awards ==
- Sitara-i-Imtiaz (Star of Excellence) Award by the President of Pakistan in 1991
- ECO Award for outstanding performance in the field of Economics (1992)
- Lifetime Academic Achievement Award (2009)
- Lifetime Award, Kanati Institute of Russia (2001–2012)

== Selected publications ==
- Perspectives on Morality and Human Well-being, Leicester (UK): Islamic Foundation, 2003.
- Development Economics: Nature and Significance. Sage Publications, New Delhi, US, London, 2002.
- The Crisis of Development Planning in Pakistan: Which Way Now? Islamabad: Institute of Policy Studies. (March 2000).
- External Shocks and Domestic Adjustment: Pakistan 's Case 1970-1990, Oxford University Press, 1997.
- Islam, Economics, and Society . London: Kegan Paul International 1994.
- Development Economics : A New Paradigm. New Delhi: Sage Publications, 1993.
- SAARC Link: An Econometric Approach. (Asian and Pacific Development Center, Kuala Lumpur, Malaysia) New Delhi: Oxford & IBH. 1992.
- Macro-Economic Framework for the Eighth Five Year Plan; Islamabad: Pakistan Institute of Development Economics, 1992.
- On Raising the Level of Economic and Social Well-Being of the People. Islamabad: Pakistan Institute of Development Economics, 1992.
- Structure of Protection and Allocative Efficiency in Manufacturing. San Francisco International Center for Economic Growth, 1991 (with A.R.Kemal).
- Structural Change in Pakistan's Agriculture. Islamabad Pakistan Institute of Development Economics. October, 1989 (with Mahmood Hasan Khan and Ghaffar Chaudhry).
- Land Reforms in Pakistan: A Historical Perspective. Islamabad: Pakistan Institute of Development Economics. November, 1987 (with Mahmood Hasan Khan and Ghaffar Chaudhry).
- Preliminary Revised P.I.D.E. Macro-Econometric Model of Pakistan 's Economy . Islamabad: Pakistan Institute of Development Economics, 1986 (with Ashfaq H. Khan and Ather Maqsood Khan).
- Ethics and Economics: An Islamic Synthesis. Published by the Islamic foundation, UK, 1981.
