= UOM =

UOM may refer to:

- Units of measurement
- University of Macedonia, a university in Thessaloniki, Greece
- University of Madras, a university in Tamil Nadu, India
- University of Maine, a university in Orono, Maine, U.S.
- University of Malakand, at Chakdara NWFP Pakistan
- University of Malta, the highest educational institution in Malta
- University of Manchester, a university in Manchester, England, UK
- University of Mauritius, a university in Moka, Mauritius
- University of Melbourne, a university in Melbourne, Australia
- University of Memphis, a university in Memphis, Tennessee, U.S.
- University of Michigan, a university with several colleges in Michigan, U.S.
- University of Minnesota, a university in the Twin Cities, Minnesota, U.S.
- University of Mogadishu, a university in Mogadishu, Somalia
- University of Montenegro, the highest educational institution in Montenegro
- University of Moratuwa, a university in Katubedda, Moratuwa, Sri Lanka
- University of Mumbai, a university in Maharashtra, India
- University of Mysore, a university in Mysore, India
