= Norman Wray =

American Roman Catholic missionary, humanitarian and educator

- Born: February 18, 1923; Chicago, Illinois, U.S.
- Died: December 23, 2014 (aged 91); Karachi, Pakistan
- Education: FSC
- Alma mater: Saint Mary's University of Minnesota
- Occupation: Religious brother
- Years active: 1946–2014
- Organization: de La Salle
- Known for: work with men with drug addictions
- Notable work: Marie Adelaide Rehabilitation Center
- Board member of: House of Hope

Norman Wray (February 18, 1923 – December 23, 2014) was an American Catholic religious brother who worked in Sindh, Pakistan, to rehabilitate drug addicts.

== Early life ==
Wray was born in 1923 in Chicago, Illinois. His mother was his role model for going out to the poor. During the depression in the 1930s his family saw children eating out of the garbage and his mother would say, "that child could be you." He joined the de La Salle brothers at the age of 19. Wray obtained his FSC from Saint Mary's University of Minnesota in 1946.

== Career ==
He dedicated his life to missionary work in Sri Lanka, India, Guatemala, and Pakistan. In 1967 he was sent to Karachi to work as an instructor at the St. Patrick's Technical School. He helped set up the St. Patrick's Technical School in Karachi and ran the program for 15 years. He became concerned at the number of boys with drug addictions and started working with them. The Alcoholics Anonymous 12-step programme was initiated with drug users in the school.

In 1982, he founded the Marie Adelaide Rehabilitation Center, a rehabilitation center where men with drug addictions could seek professional help to rebuild their lives. When Brother Norman started the center, he worked with eight drug-dependent men. The centre was opened by Bishop Anthony Theodore Lobo. In 2012 there were around 250 drug users at the centre, while hundreds have been rehabilitated.

He was also involved with paramedical work among the prisoners in Karachi Prison, teaching Hindu and Christian children in the slums and a home for abandoned children.

In 2003, Br. Norman celebrated his 80th birthday and the Diamond Jubilee of Religious life as a de La Salle brother. He also established a Rehabilitation Centre for drug and substance abusers in Sinjoro in the Sindh Province. He was a member of the Governing board of this centre known as the House of Hope. The project includes a Halfway House in Catholic Colony in Karachi to help recovering addicts transition to a life of sobriety. Alarmed that HIV infection was rapidly increasing among drug users in Karachi and had reached 9% in 2004–5, Br. Norman stepped up his work with the Marie Adelaide Rehabilitation Center, with drug users by introducing harm reduction programmes in Karachi.

In 1984, a Drop-In Centre and a Mobile Clinic were also started by him to cater to the needs of those addicts who are on the streets because they don't have a place to stay. The cost of running these programs is 1 million rupees per month for the Rehabilitation Centre in Sinjoro, the Half Way House, Drop-In Centre and Mobile Clinic in Karachi. Donations and patient fees cover around 50 percent of the expenses locally. The other 50 percent came from foreign donors.

On August 15, 2012, Brother Norman completed 70 years of humanitarian service and a special thanksgiving Mass was held in St. Lawrence's Church, Karachi, presided over by Archbishop Joseph Coutts.

== Death ==
Wray died of Alzheimer's disease on December 23, 2014, aged 91, after having worked in Pakistan for the under-privileged for 47 years.
