= Christian Voice =

Christian Voice may refer to:

- Christian Voice (UK), a UK Christian lobby group
- Christian Voice (United States), an American conservative Christian advocacy group
- Christian Voice, Karachi, a Pakistani newspaper
