= Schoonoord =

Schoonoord can refer to:

- Schoonoord, South Africa
- Schoonoord, Coevorden
- Schoonoord (North Holland)
- Schoonoord (Rotterdam)
- Schoonoord (windmill)
