= Ruth Lewis =

Pakistani Roman Catholic nun (1946–2020)

Ruth Lewis SI
- Born: 1946
- Died: 20 July 2020; Karachi, Pakistan
- Citizenship: Pakistani
- Occupation: Religious sister
- Years active: 1969–2020
- Organization: Franciscan Missionaries of Christ the King
- Awards: Pride of Karachi Award 2014; Hakim Mohammed Said Award 2018; Sitara-i-Imtiaz 2020

Ruth Lewis (1946 – 20 July 2020) was a Roman Catholic nun of the religious congregation for women, the Franciscan Missionaries of Christ the King, living and working in Karachi, Pakistan.

== Vocation ==
On 17 February 1969, she became along with Sr. Gertrude Lemmens and Sr. Margaret D'Costa, one of the first to join the staff of Darul Sukun, home for around 150 mentally and physically disabled people, mostly children and teenagers, founded by the sisters of the Franciscan Missionaries of Christ the King.

From 2000, she was in charge of the Darul Sukun. Sister Lewis was assisted by a team of five other nuns. Some of the residents like Cookie Lewis were so attached to the nun that she adopted her surname.

She depended on many people and institutions who helped her run a home of this size. She praised the people who supplied groceries, clothes or whatever the sisters needed for the institution. Volunteers from schools and other organisations also help feed the children and play with them. She was also assisted by volunteers from the Netherlands who stay to help for as much as three months. Without financial assistance from the Government, she relied on donations to run the institution.

She was particularly proud of four of the children who won medals in the Special Olympics held in the United States in 1998.

Her role included welcoming visitors like American singer Mary McBride and Amanda Claudwell, the US press attaché in Karachi, who visited on October 30, 2011.

She has been listed among the people in Imran Aslam's book on the men and women who shaped Karachi.

== Making a wish ==
In January 2015, Make-A-Wish Foundation Pakistan granted the wish of Cookie Lewis from Darul Sukun, to be a teacher for a day. The President of Make-A-Wish Foundation and the Director of Education were also present with Sister Lewis at a ceremony held for the occasion.

== Recognition ==
On 18 January 2014, she received the Pride of Karachi Award, which aimed to recognize and honor those individuals who have worked selflessly and passionately for the betterment of society.

In 2018, she received the Hakim Mohammed Said Award for her work for humanity. The award was presented by Sindh Governor Muhammad Zubair.

Sister Ruth Lewis died due to complications from COVID-19 during the COVID-19 pandemic in Pakistan on 20 July 2020 in Karachi.

On 14 August 2020, President Arif Alvi announced the posthumous grant of the civil award Sitara-i-Imtiaz to Lewis for her Public Service.
