= Leroy Lamis =

American sculptor

- Born: September 27, 1925; Eddyville, Iowa
- Died: August 19, 2010 (aged 84); Austin, Texas
- Education: New Mexico Highlands University, Columbia University
- Known for: Sculpture, Digital art

Leroy Lamis (1925–2010) was an American sculptor, digital artist and art educator known for his work with Plexiglas. His works have been exhibited throughout the United States and Europe and are in the permanent collections of numerous institutions including the Whitney Museum of American Art and the Smithsonian American Art Museum.

== Early life ==
Lamis was born in Eddyville, Iowa on September 27, 1925, and later moved to Los Angeles. As a teenager, he had a job with MGM Studios. Lamis went on to attend New Mexico Highlands University and Columbia University.

In 1954 Lamis married Esther Sackler. He is a descendant from the Dutch Lemmens family originating from the village of St. Anthonis in North Brabant, the Netherlands

== Professional life ==
After a time teaching at Cornell College in Mount Vernon, Iowa, he took a position at Indiana State University in Terre Haute. Lamis taught there in the studio art and art history disciplines from 1961-1988. In 1970 Lamis was the Artist in Residence at Dartmouth College.

In the early 1960s, Lamis and his cubist sculptures were well received in New York City, and he was invited to join the Contemporaries Gallery. His works were featured in the annual exhibit of the Whitney Museum of American Art in 1964, and in 1965 his work was included in the Museum of Modern Art's exhibit The Responsive Eye.

Lamis was represented by the Staempfli Gallery (New York) from 1965 to 1971. During this time his work was featured across the United States. He was also a member of the American Abstract Artists.

== Works and honors ==
"Construction #48" is a representative example of Lamis's plexiglas cubes.

Lamis was strongly influenced by constructivism, which he read about as an art student, particularly the theories of Naum Gabo, Antoine Pevsner and Richard Lippold. Throughout the 1960s and early 1970s, Lamis worked with sheet acrylic (Poly(methyl methacrylate), more commonly called Plexiglas), drawn to its reflective and refractive qualities. Many of his works were precisely-measured, abstractly geometric cubes named Construction sequentially, such as Construction #31 (1963) at the Loretta Howard Gallery, Construction #48 (1964), in the collection of the Brooklyn Museum, and Construction #208 (1972), at the Swope Art Museum in Terre Haute, Indiana.

In the late 1970s Lamis became interested in computer-generated work. He taught himself computer programming and began creating geometric two-dimensional and three-dimensional art based on geometric shapes. A representative example is the lithograph Untitled: Computer Generated Image (1987), printed by Atelier Franck Bordas and in the collections of both the Metropolitan Museum of Art and the Smithsonian American Art Museum.

In addition to printed work, Lamis also created digital projections, such as Untitled #35 (1998–99), part of the 1999 New York Digital Salon.

One of Lamis's tools of choice for his digital art was the IBM PCjr, which, according to his wife Esther, he began using around its release in 1984 and was still working with as late as 1998, long after the particular computer model had been discontinued.
