= Salesius Lemmens =

Dutch Franciscan friar

The Right Rev. Monsignor Salesius Lemmens O.F.M.
- Apostolic Prefect of Karachi
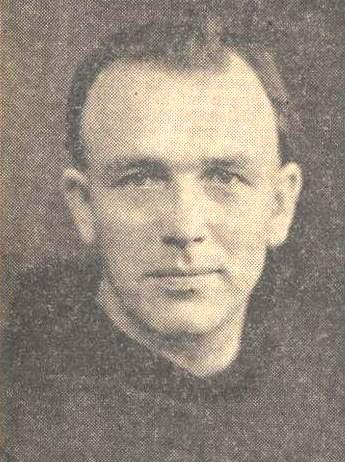
- See: Apostolic Prefecture of Karachi
- Successor: James Cornelius van Miltenburg O.F.M.

Orders
- Ordination: 10 March 1929

Personal details
- Born: 24 May 1904 Venray, Limburg, Netherlands
- Died: 21 March 1942 (aged 37) Karachi, Sind, British India

Salesius Lemmens, was a Dutch Franciscan friar who served as the Apostolic Prefect of the Catholic Church in Karachi, then a part of British India. He died at the age of 37 in a drowning accident in the harbour of Karachi.

== Early career ==
Lemmens came from a large family and was raised in a devout Catholic home. A younger sister, Gertrude Lemmens, also became a noted missionary in India. He attended a college run by the Friars Minor in Venray, and 7 September 1922 was received into the Franciscan Order at the Alverna friary in Wijchen.

Lemmens professed solemn vows on 27 March 1927. On 18 March 1928 he was installed as a subdeacon. and was ordained a priest on 10 March 1929 in Oostrum.

After his ordination, Lemmens was assigned to the friary at Woerden and then in August 1931 as an assistant pastor at the Franciscan church on the Laanderstraat in Heerlen. Additionally he wrote a column in the Dagblad de Limburger called From the Scriptures. He gave religious instruction and was also chairman of the Department of Young Workmen in the government. In March 1934 he was appointed spiritual adviser to the St. Clemens Technicians Association. He served in a similar capacity for the Young Guard.

== Missionary service ==
Lemmens' request to serve in the foreign missions was approved by his superiors and, in May 1935, he departed for the mission in Karachi where he arrived on 7 June. His farewell ceremony took place in Heerlen. In a speech the leader of the Young Guard said about Lemmens:

Father Salesius was always around. In winter every night and each Sunday he was with us from 3-10 hours. Sometimes it was the club, then a meeting, rehearsal or leader meeting. He always created a cozy atmosphere. He was for us like a father.

On 31 March 1936 Lemmens was named as the head of the Catholic mission in the Sind. From Karachi he wrote an article in the St. Anthony’s Mission Magazine on the conversion work there. He contributed to the development of St Patrick's High School, Karachi, he founded the St Francis Grammar School in Quetta, a hospital in Nawabshah and in August 1937 along with Sister Bridget Sequeira contributed to the foundation of a religious institute for native Religious Sisters, the Franciscan Missionaries of Christ the King, which has around 174 sisters working in India. In 1938 he was named a prelate by the Holy See and appointed Apostolic Prefect of the Sind and Baluchistan.

Lemmens died while swimming in the port of Karachi, at the age of 37, by drowning. The Requiem Mass took place in the parish church of Our Lady in Venray.

== Coat of arms ==
Lemmens' coat of arms as Apostolic Prefect consisted of a three-part shield, each with its own meaning. The bottom section showed the emblem of the Order of Friars Minor, namely the arm of Christ with the nail wound, crossed by the arm of St. Francis with the stigmata. The upper part was divided into two fields, each section had an escutcheon - something related to the origin of the person to which it belonged. The right section contained the image of Our Lady of Oostrum. The left field showed the Sind Desert with its distinctive animal, the camel, while in the background rise the mountains of Baluchistan.

With the motto Sub Matris tutela (under maternal protection), Lemmens dedicated his work as superior of the Dutch mission in Karachi under the patronage of the Blessed Virgin, the patroness of the Franciscans and of his birthplace. The shield shows that it belonged to a religious head of Sind and Baluchistan, who was a member of the Franciscan Order and from Oostrum.

== Notes ==
Adapted from the Dutch article by Menke and translated with the help of Google.
