= Asif Mahmood Jah =

Pakistani philanthropist, Customs officer, Medical Doctor, Social worker and Writer

- ڈاکٹر آصف محمود جاہ
- Education: King Edward Medical University, Lahore, Pakistan
- Occupations: Philanthropist, customs officer, medical doctor, social worker, writer
- Years active: 1992 – present
- Employer(s): Federal Board of Revenue, Pakistan
- Organization: Customs Healthcare Society
- Awards: Sitara-i-Imtiaz (Star of Excellence) award by the President of Pakistan (2016) *Hilal-i-Imtiaz (Crescent of Excellence) award by the President of Pakistan (2021)

Asif Mahmood Jah is a Pakistani philanthropist, customs officer, medical doctor, social worker and writer.

== Career ==
Asif Mahmood Jah has a multi-dimensional personality. From his service as a customs officer, he has experience in tax administration and tax operations. He took an early retirement from his Customs Officer's job in 2021. He was then appointed as the Federal Tax Ombudsman of Pakistan in 2022.

As a medical doctor, he has been treating poor and non-affording patients for the last 30 years. As a social worker and social activist, he has established hospitals, mobile clinics, 43 dispensaries, community welfare centers and schools throughout Pakistan.

Due to his efforts, 150 green farms have been established over an area of 1000 acres in Thal Desert area of Punjab, Pakistan. These farms cultivate wheat, vegetables and fodder for the cattle. In addition, he also started an Income Generation Scheme for the women of Thal Desert in Punjab.

Under his guidance, his NGO called Customs Healthcare Center were able to install 1100 drinking water wells, dug for nearly 1000 water hand-pumps and installed them in Sindh and Balochistan provinces of Pakistan to provide clean drinking water to the population of Thal Desert, Punjab and Balochistan.

Following the 2005 Pakistan earthquake, his philanthropic work and laudable services were appreciated in Pakistan.

== Literary works ==
Jah has authored about 30 books in Urdu language. He also writes for various newspapers.

- Dwa, Ghiza aur Shifa (Medicine, Diet and Recovery) published by the National Book Foundatioin of Pakistan.

== Award and honors ==
- Sitara-i-Imtiaz (Star of Excellence) award by the President of Pakistan (2016).
- Hilal-i-Imtiaz (Crescent of Excellence) award by the President of Pakistan (2021)
