= Rotti Press =

Press in Pakistan owned by the Roman Catholic Archdiocese of Karachi

The Rotti Press is the only printing press in Pakistan owned by the Roman Catholic Archdiocese of Karachi. The press is located in Blenkin Street, Saddar, Karachi.

== History ==
“Dor Mhoineache Rotti” a Konkani language publication first out in 1915, was published by the Rotti Press by Fr. Vincent Lobo. This is how the press got its name. The press was started with Rs. 30,000 by Fr. Salesius Lemmens OFM. In 1936, Bro Herbert Hessing OFM, an expert in printing, arrived in Karachi. New printing machines arrived three months later and the press took off. It became one of the leading presses in Karachi. Many young men were trained in the printing trade and gained jobs around the country. Later the press was modernised using German, Swedish and American machinery.

In 1937 the Franciscans built the Saint Francis of Assisi Church building on Pilgrim Road. The press was located on the ground floor of the church building.

The press has a long history of publishing books on philosophy, history, religion, education and culture.

The press currently also publishes the Christian Voice, Karachi an English-language weekly newspaper and a weekly Urdu-language paper Agahi.

In October 2010, the Rotti Press printed two books - Tofah (Gift) and Yasu (Jesus) to be used for Sunday School instruction in Pakistan. Five thousand copies have been printed each for all dioceses nationwide. The books were launched by Archbishop Evarist Pinto of Karachi.
