= Abdul Razzaq Kemal =

Pakistani economist

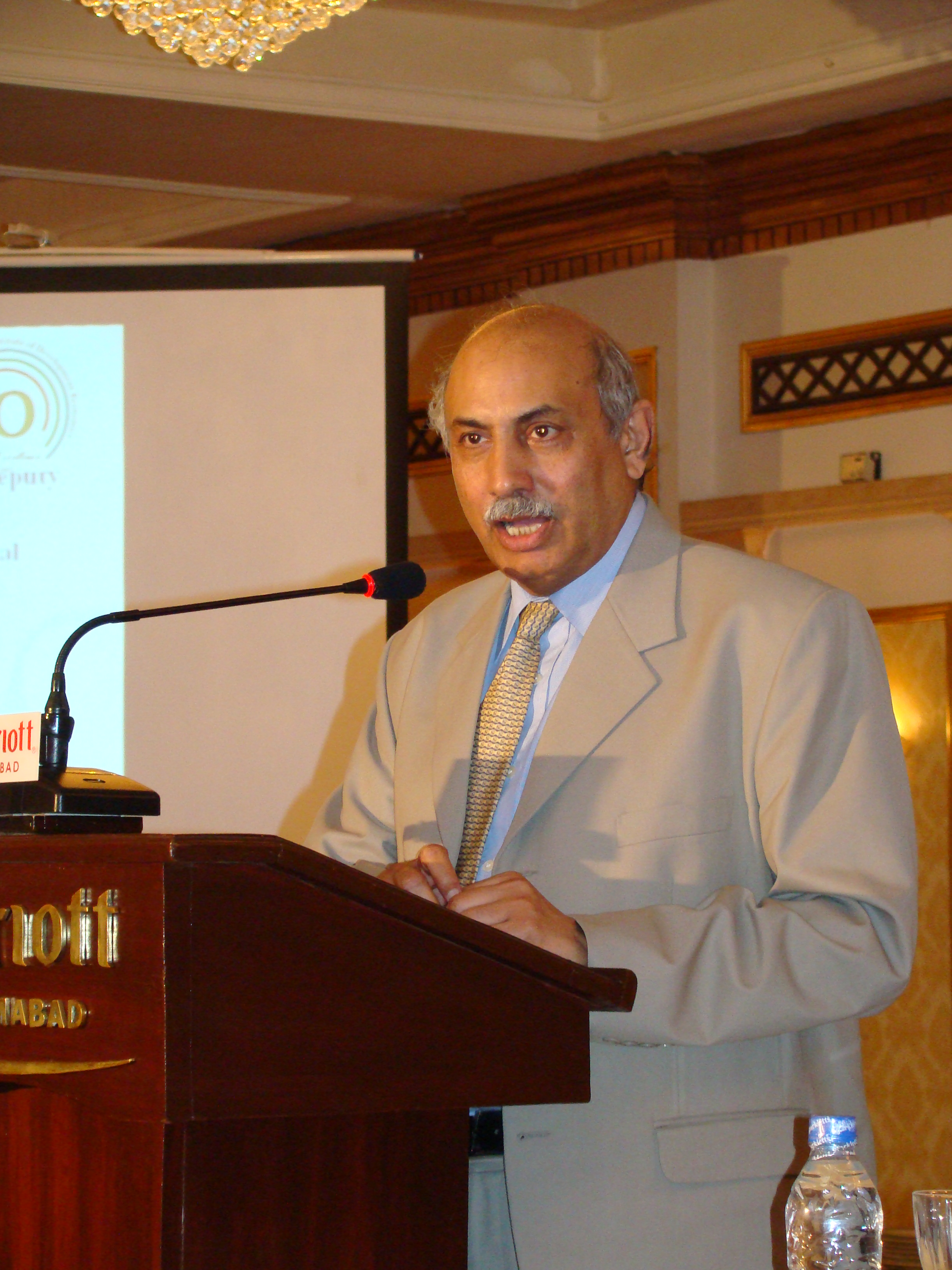
- A R Kemal in 2008
- Born: 14 April 1946; Amritsar, British-India
- Died: 24 March 2008 (aged 61); Islamabad
- Education: M.A. Stanford University, PHD University of Manchester
- Known for: Contributions on Pakistani economy and on economic policy making
- Children: 2
- Awards: Sitara-i-Imtiaz (Star of Excellence) (2007)

Abdul Razzaq Kemal (known as A. R. Kemal) (14 April 1946 – 24 March 2008) was a Pakistani economist, considered "an authority on the Pakistani economy and on economic policy making". He was the director of the Pakistan Institute of Development Economics (1999–2006).

== Early life and education ==
Kemal was born in Amritsar, India, in 1946. His qualifications in economics included a master's degree from Stanford University, US, and a PhD from the University of Manchester, UK.

== Career ==
Kemal served as the chief economist of the Pakistani government Planning Commission and economic advisor to the Ministry of Finance. He directed the Pakistan Institute of Development Economics from 1999 to 2006. During his directorship, he started MPhil and PhD programmes in economics, and was instrumental in the institute's application for degree-awarding status being approved in 2003, although the degree-awarding charter was not finalised until after his retirement.

He was also a member of the restructuring committee of the Islamic Research and Training Institute and the Islamic Development Bank. He advised organisations including the United Nations Development Programme (UNDP), UNICEF, United Nations Economic and Social Commission for Asia and the Pacific (ESCAP), International Labour Organization (ILO), Asian Development Bank and the World Bank. He served as president of the Pakistan Institute of Development Economics (PIDE).

He taught economics at the International Islamic University in Islamabad. He wrote or edited 12 books and published 186 research articles.

== Personal life ==
He was married with two children, both sons. In 2008, Kemal died in Islamabad at the age of 62, after a heart attack.

== Awards and recognition ==
- Sitara-i-Imtiaz (Star of Excellence) Award by the President of Pakistan in 2007

== Selected publications ==
- Rashid Amjad, A. R. Kemal (1997). Macroeconomic Policies and their Impact on Poverty Alleviation in Pakistan. The Pakistan Development Review 36: 39–68
