= St. Vincent's Home for the Aged =

Old age home in Karachi, Pakistan

St. Vincent's Home for the Aged in Karachi, Pakistan, is a home for older people.

St. Vincent's Home for the Aged is situated off the main Shara-e-Faisal. It is a home for the very poor and destitute.

== History ==
It was inaugurated and blessed by Cardinal Joseph Cordeiro, Archbishop of Karachi on 12 September 1960.

In the early days the only existing Conference of St. Vincent de Paul's Society was that of St. Patrick's Parish and under the leadership of its President, Mr. C.M. Lobo, the Conference initially catered for the basic needs of the Home.

The responsibility of caring for the residents was entrusted to the Sisters of the Franciscan Missionaries of Christ the King (F.M.C.K). Sr. Margaret D'Costa was the first Sister-Incharge of the Home. Initially, she had five Residents but slowly the number increased and the soon the Home was fully occupied.

The Home had its first Advisory Board set up on 20 May 1966 which consisted of Mr. Augustine Fernandes as the President, Fr. Anthony Lobo as the Spiritual Director and Sr. Matilda, Sr. Margaret, Mrs. K. Gomes, Mrs. O. Pereira, Sgt Yousuf and Mr. J. Vaz.

On 20 March 1971, the Archbishop constituted a fresh Advisory Board and Mr. Valentine Gonsalves was elected President and his wife Joyce Gonsalves as Secretary . The other members of the Board were Fr. Simeon Anthony Pereira, Sr. Mercedes, Mrs. C. Fernandes, Mr. and Mrs. O.B. Nazareth, Mr. and Mrs. E. Gabriel and Mr. Augustine Fernandes.

In 1980, the construction of the new Home was undertaken with funds from "Help of the Aged" in London, the Society of Vincent de Paul and Cardinal Cordeiro. The Home was officially declared open on 12 December 1982 by Cardinal Cordeiro.

On 22 February 1991, the blessing and opening of the 1st floor was done by Mr. and Mrs. Eric Ellem and blessed by Cardinal Cordeiro. Tables and cupboards for the 1st floor were donated by Dr. Joe Coelho.

The Home is celebrated its Golden Jubilee on 25 September 2010. Sr. Fazilat Inayat in charge of the Home at the time.

Medical Mission Sisters in Karachi are involved with the work of the Home. From 2005 to 2009 Sister Celine Bernier of the Holy Family Hospital, Karachi has also been on the board of the St. Vincent's Home.

In 2013, the cost of living in the home is around Rs. 2,000 (US$20) per month.

== Facilities ==
It consisted of three separate blocks. Each consisting of six rooms and approximately 35 residents could be accommodated – two or three persons to a room. The Home at that time had no electricity or running water, there were no wash basins and no individual toilets – only common toilets for men and women. The passages were of mud.

The Home in 2010 consists of 24 rooms with attached bathrooms, hot and cold water, filtered drinking water, and a shared kitchen. There are two television sets for both the wings (gents and ladies).
