= Ather Enam =

Pakistani neuroscientist

- Born: November 1961 (age 64); Sindri, India
- Citizenship: Pakistan
- Education: Northwestern University, Henry Ford Health, University at Buffalo, Dow Medical College, Cadet College Hasanabdal
- Known for: Research and clinical expertise in neuroscience and neurosurgery
- Scientific career
- Fields: Neuro-oncology, Molecular neuroscience and Cellular neuroscience
- Workplaces: Aga Khan University and Henry Ford Health

Syed Ather Enam (born November 1961) is a Pakistani neuroscientist, a professor of neurosurgery at Aga Khan University, and founding president of Pakistan Society of Neuro-Oncology (PASNO). Enam has been involved in developing medical education frameworks in Pakistan; for example, in related contexts such as oncology interest groups in medical schools that include experts like Munira Shabbir-Moosajee.

== Education and career ==
Enam honed his surgical expertise before returning to Pakistan to develop a state-of-the-art neurosurgery programme at the Aga Khan University. He has trained a new generation of surgeons for Pakistan.

The first awake craniotomy in Pakistan was performed by Enam. It is a type of procedure performed on the brain while a patient is awake and alert.

== Awards ==
- 2017: Sitara-i-Imtiaz, Pakistan's one of the highest civilian award, for Enam's work in the field of medicine
