= Dar-ul-Sukun =

Pakistani home for people with disabilities

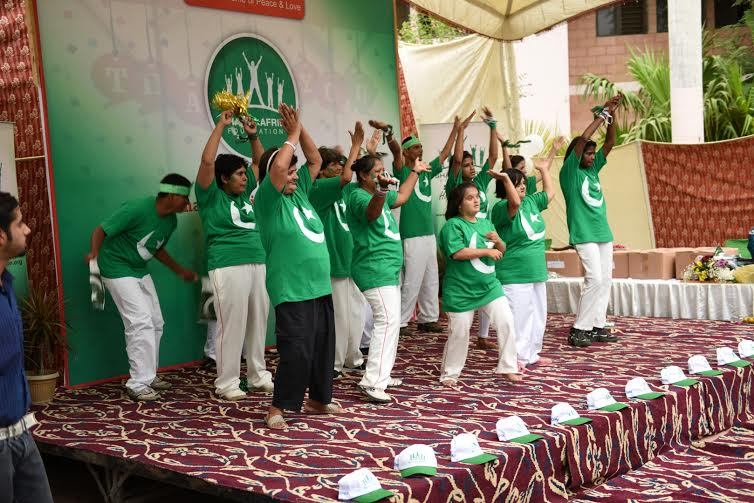
Some Dar-ul-Sukun residents participating in rehabilitation activities

Dar-ul-Sukun (Urdu: دارالسکون) (House of Peace) in Karachi, Sindh, Pakistan is a home for physically and mentally disabled children and adults, both men and women in poverty or unable to address their challenges. It has three branches across Karachi. The branch at Kashmir Road cares for almost 150 people. The home has 53 staff members.

== Background and facilities ==
Dar-ul-Sukun has taken responsibility for care of the underprivileged persons from various backgrounds, such as those who are mentally disabled, those who cannot be treated or accommodated at home, physically disabled, or abandoned people. It is one of many organizations in Karachi that care for people in need; another example is the Edhi Foundation.

It was founded in 1969 by Sister Gertrude Lemmens (14 July 1914 – 27 October 2000) and was run by her successor Sister Ruth Lewis until her death on July 21, 2020. Their three-story building claims to offer clean and well-lit rooms and recreation facilities for residents. Among the rooms are physiotherapy, resting and electrotherapy rooms.

The centre sends people abroad to compete in the international Special Olympics. One noteworthy winner has been Jacky Master, an HR officer in a local tobacco company who was born with brain damage. Master won one gold and four bronze medals in swimming.

On 18 February 2019, Darul Sukun celebrated its golden jubilee with Mass con-celebrated by Cardinal Joseph Coutts along with three priests.

== Recognition ==
On March 23, 1989, Sister Gertrude Lemmens received the Sitara-i-Quaid-i-Azam award in recognition of her work at Darul Sukun and for founding additional homes for disabled people, older people and homeless people.

On August 14, 2020, the President of Pakistan posthumously granted the civil award Sitara-i-Imtiaz to Sr. Ruth Lewis for her Public Service.
