= Faridullah Khan =

Pakistani politician

Malik Faridullah Khan Wazir

Member of the Senate of Pakistan
- In office 1985–1997

Federal Minister
- In office unknown–unknown

Personal details
- Born: Bannu
- Died: 29 May 2005 South Waziristan
- Resting place: Kotka Khanbahadar Asperka Waziran
- Children: Taimoor Farid Khan, Ali Farid Khan, Saad Farid Khan
- Occupation: Politician
- Awards: Hilal-i-Imtiaz (2005)

Malik Faridullah Khan Wazir (HI) (died 29 May 2005) was a Pakistani politician and former federal minister and member of the Senate of Pakistan.

Khan was assassinated on 29 May 2005, shortly after leaving Wana, the regional headquarters of South Waziristan, after attending a media briefing by Major General Niaz Khattak, GOC, Wana.

== Awards and honors ==
- Hilal-i-Imtiaz – (2005)
