= Oswald Bruno Nazareth =

Pakistani school teacher

- Died: April 1998; Karachi
- Education: St Patrick's High School, Karachi
- Occupation: Teacher
- Employer(s): St Patrick's High School, Karachi
- Notable work: Drafting the constitution of the Pakistan Hockey Federation

Oswald Bruno Nazareth (died April 1998) was a Pakistani high school teacher.

== Biography ==
Born a Roman Catholic Christian, Nazareth belonged to the Goan community of Pakistan.

A keen sportsman, he drafted the constitution of the Pakistan Hockey Federation and was its first Secretary. In 1948, he was Assistant Manager representing the Pakistan Hockey team at the London Olympics.

During 50 years of service as a teacher in St. Patrick's High School, Nazareth taught many distinguished students including the former Indian BJP President L.K. Advani, former prime minister Muhammad Khan Junejo, former president Pervez Musharraf and former Chief of Army Staff Jehangir Karamat. His other students included cardinals, archbishops, bishops, priests, federal and provincial ministers, chief justices, judges of the supreme and high courts, industrialists and sportsmen.

He also served on the Advisory Board of the St. Vincent's Home for the Aged, Karachi, in the 1970s.

In September 1986 the ex-students of St. Patrick's organised "A Tribute to O.B. Nazareth", held at the Hotel Sheraton and attended by 500 students and their spouses. The group called Nazareth "one of the most popular teachers of his time".

He died in Karachi in April 1998.

On 6 May 2011, at the closing ceremony of the 150th anniversary of the school, the Old Patricians (former students of the school) presented the O.B. Nazareth Gold Medal to the top student from the Science section.
