= Pakistan Institute of Development Economics =

Post-graduate research institute and public policy think tank in Islamabad, Pakistan

- پاکستان دانشگاہِ ترقیاتی معاشیات
- Abbreviation: PIDE
- Formation: 1957
- Headquarters: Quaid-i-Azam University Campus, Islamabad, 44000, Pakistan
- Affiliations: HEC
- Website: http://pide.org.pk/

The Pakistan Institute of Development Economics (Urdu: پاکستان دانشگاہِ ترقیاتی معاشیات) is a post-graduate research institute and a public policy think tank located in the vicinity of Islamabad, Pakistan.

== History ==
Founded in 1957 by the Government of Pakistan, it is located in the university area of Quaid-e-Azam University but it has its own board of overseers. In 1964, it gained its influence on government and gained autonomous status the same year. Since its establishment, the PIDE has been an influential voice in the formation of Pakistan's public policy concerning diverse issues. The institute has long been a place of scholarship of high-profile, prominent individuals who previously held positions in government, including Benazir Bhutto, Mahbub-ul-Haq, Robert Mundell (a Nobel Laureate who serves on our Advisory Committee) and Shahid Allam— all PIDE fellows.

Since the 1990s, its research has been devoted to theoretical and empirical research in development economics in general and on Pakistan-related economic issues in particular. In addition, the PIDE also grants post-graduate and doctoral degrees in various disciplines of social sciences since 2006.

== Organisational structure ==
=== Institutional offices ===
The Vice-Chancellor of the Pakistan Institute of Development Economics is the executive head of the institute and heads the Syndicate, while the Deputy Chairman of the Planning Commission is the Chancellor. The overseeing body of the Institute is the Senate of PIDE; its membership is gained through both nomination and election. The President of Pakistan is the Patron of PIDE.

In view of PIDE's current status as a degree-awarding academic institution, the many administrative and cadre changes necessary for the purpose can be foreseen. As such, other governing bodies are being formed to cope with the future needs of PIDE's various component units.

Apart from the teaching departments, the main divisions at PIDE consist of Research, Publications, Training, Library, and Computer services. Besides the Human Resource Development Division, headed by the registrar, the staff generally consists of Chief of Research, Senior Research Economist, Research Economist, Staff Economist, and Visiting Fellow. Equivalent posts exist in other fields. Additionally, each professional division is headed by the respective chief of the division.

In light of PIDE's recently expanded educational role, the teaching faculties at the Institute are among its main focal developments.

==== Directors, joint directors and vice-chancellors ====
- Gustav Ranis (1959–60)
- Emile Despres (1960–64)
- Irving Brecher (1961–62)
- Henry Bruton (1962–63)
- Mark Leiserson (1963–64)
- Nurul Islam (1964–71)
- Taufique M. Khan (1965–70)
- S. M. Naseem (1972) (acting director)
- M. L. Qureshi (1972–79)
- Sultan Hashmi (1977–79)
- Durr-e-Nayab Director Research & Joint Director (1990 - Date)
- Syed Nawab Haider Naqvi (1979–93; 1993–95)
- Sarfraz Khan Qureshi (1993; 1995–99
- M Ghaffar Chaudhry (1964 -2002; 1993 - 2002)
- A. R. Kemal (1999–2006)
- Nadeem Ul Haque (2006–7) (Vice Chancellor)
- Naushin Mahmood (2007) (acting vice chancellor)
- Rashid Amjad (2007–2013)
- Asad Zaman (2013– 2019)
- Nadeem Ul Haque (2019–2024)
- Nadeem Javaid (2025 to Date)

=== International advisory board ===
At the beginning, three well-known economists, Max F. Millikan, Gunner Myrdal (Nobel Laureate), and E. A. G. Robinson formed the Institute's International Advisory Board. Following registration with the Government of Pakistan as an autonomous organisation and the transfer of management to Pakistanis, the International Advisory Board extended its membership to seven Internationally well known economists, namely, Hollis B. Chenery, Ansley J. Coale, Just Faaland, Harry G. Johnson, Gustav Ranis, and Paul P. Streeten. Currently, there are ten well-known economists from all over the world who are members of the International Advisory Board. They are Gamani Corea, Just Faaland, Albert O. Hirschman, Lawrence R. Klein (Nobel Laureate), Janos Kornai, E. Malinvaud, Robert A. Mundell (Nobel Laureate), Gustav Ranis, Paul P. Streeten, and Winfried von Urff.

=== Finances ===
PIDE is mainly funded by the Government of Pakistan, and partly through earnings from its endowment and the studies carried out for various international organisations. The institute has always enjoyed generous patronage and support. H.R.H. The Aga Khan III had provided the seed money for the Institute's founding in the late 1950s. The Ford Foundation has also been contributing funds. In 1979, USAID provided a substantial endowment grant. The United Bank Limited, Industrial Development Bank of Pakistan, Pak-Kuwait Investment Company Limited, Pak-Libya Holding Company Limited, and Investment Corporation of Pakistan have provided additional financial resources.

=== Research divisions ===
PIDE has been restructured around two main research themes and six sub-themes. It has now two Departments underlining research themes for the year 2006-2007 and six Divisions for sub-themes. The Institute has been restructured as follows:

1. Institutions, Growth, and Macroeconomics Department, which includes the following three Divisions:
  1. one point one Development Strategies and Governance;
  2. one point two Human Capital, Innovation, and Growth; and
  3. one point three Macroeconomics, Banking and Finance.
2. Markets and Society Department, which includes the following three Divisions:
  1. Two point one Industrial Organisation, Markets, and Regulation;
  2. Two point two Agricultural Production, Markets, and Institutions; and
  3. Two point three Population and Social Dynamics.

=== Collaborative research ===
A number of studies have been completed at PIDE in collaboration with various international organisations, including the World Bank, Committee for International Cooperation on Research in Demography (CICRED), Asian Development Bank (ADB), International Labour Organisation (ILO), the United Nations Fund for Population Activities (UNFPA), United Nations Children's Fund (UNICEF), World Bank Institute (WBI), Asian Development Bank Institute (ADBI), World Economic Forum, United Nations Educational, Scientific, and Cultural Organisation (UNESCO), Economic and Social Commission for Asia and Pacific (ESCAP), United Nations Institute for Training and Research (UNITAR), ILO/ARTEP, Asian and Pacific Development Centre (APDC), International Food Policy Research Institute (IFPRI), Erasmus University (Rotterdam), Institute of Social Studies (The Hague), Friedrich Ebert Stiftung (FES), Germany, Food and Agriculture Organisation of the UN (FAO), University of Tübingen, Germany, International Centre for Economic Growth, USA, International Development Research Centre (IDRC) Canada, etc.

The studies conducted under these arrangements include topics such as the Structure of Protection and Allocative Efficiency in Pakistan, Population, Labour Force and Migration, Employment Projections, Population of Pakistan, Wheat Market in Pakistan, Human Resource Development, Capital Flows and Economic Adjustment in the Developing Countries, Sustainable Development in Pakistan (with a focus on the conservation and pollution issues), Household Food Security in Pakistan, the Ration Shop System, Food Outlook and Security in Pakistan, anthropological studies in the areas of Women's Activities and Social Status, Natural Resource Management, Traditional Wisdom and Change, Ethnic Antagonism, Informal Sector in the Rural and Urban Areas, and Land Transport and Communication Linkages in the SAARC Region.

Two recent studies completed in collaboration with the United Nations Funds for Population Activities and UNICEF are the “Census Data Analysis” and “National Nutrition Survey 2001-02”. Currently, the second round of the poverty assessment project (PRHS-2) is under way, in collaboration with the World Bank. “Interim Evaluation of the Rural Support Programme in Pakistan” is being undertaken in nine districts of Pakistan in collaboration with the World Bank, Pakistan Poverty Alleviation Fund, National Rural Support Programme, and Punjab Rural Support Programme. PIDE, in collaboration with the International Development Research Centre (IDRC), Canada, has also worked on a project on “Community-based Monitoring System”.

=== SANEI ===
SANEI is a regional initiative to foster networking and collaboration among economic research institutes in South Asia. Initiated in June 1998, SANEI seeks to establish strong research inter-linkages among various economic research institutes in the region with a view to encouraging a better-informed policy-making process. As such, special emphasis is given to capacity building and formation of a South Asia-wide professional network of researchers engaged in policy-oriented studies.

SANEI organises annual research competitions within the South Asian region. Collaborative research has received strong support. This implies that in addition to stand-alone research, SANEI funds projects which are jointly carried out by at least two research institutes based in two different countries in South Asia. Studies carried out under the auspices of SANEI are published. SANEI also holds annual conferences as part of its effort to promote an exchange of ideas on economic research in the region, as well as to disseminate its research findings.

The activities of the participating institutes are integrated and coordinated by the respective regional/country network. Until recently, SANEI was housed in the Indian Council for Research on International Economic Relations, New Delhi, India. The headquarters of the organisation moved to Pakistan a couple of years ago. The Pakistan Institute of Development Economics (PIDE) is the current Coordinator for the South Asia Network.

A Research Advisory Panel (RAP), comprising renowned economists from South Asia, evaluates research proposals submitted by the network of institutions. The Panel reviews the progress of the projects and provides expert guidance, with the objective to improve the quality of research.

A constitution, “SANEI, Pakistan”, has been adopted and the body has been registered as a Society, with T. N. Srinivasan as its Chairman and Nadeem Ul Haque as its Secretary (Coordinator). Funds for research at SANEI are provided by the Global Development Network.

== Departments ==
=== Department of Economics and Econometrics ===
In the early 2000s, the then director, A. R. Kemal started PhD programme in economics. The programme offers a wide range of optional areas within the subject, particular areas of economics, from both a theoretical and an empirical perspective. The Department of Economics consists of senior faculty members.

The teaching curriculum focuses on developing the role and application of economic approaches for environmental issues, essential features of the market mechanism to control environmental degradation for sustainable economic development, the nature and treatment of environmental effects in economic reasoning and decision-making, and the application of environmental policy instruments based on economic analysis. The course work is based on contemporary environmental management approaches (e.g. ecological modernization, ecological economics, and industrial ecology) with substantial (physical) economy dimensions.

Keeping in view the current lack of awareness and knowledge of Environmental issues, the MS Environmental Economics Programme is designed to:

- Impart a sound understanding of the nexus between the economy and the environment;
- Teach major concepts and theories to explain and describe the economic behaviour of human beings and its impact on the environment.
- Outline and contrast the major economic schools of thought on the environment, and highlight the weaknesses of each market system (especially with regard to environmental aspects) and discuss the associated role of the government in the economy.
- Supply high-quality personnel to the federal and provincial governments, to educational institutions, to research institutions and to the private sector.

The department also offers the MSc degree in Econometrics and Statistics. These include basic econometric theory, applied econometrics, probability theory, statistical methods, sampling, time series analysis, financial econometrics, and micro econometrics. This programme is for students having a bachelor's degree in Statistics or Mathematics. The programme also prepares students for admission to the PhD programme.

=== Department of Business Studies ===
Department of Business Studies currently offer MBA, M.Phil. in Business Economics, Economics and Finance and MS in Management Sciences Programs approved by HEC. Hafsa Hina is head of department.

=== Department of Population Sciences ===
The department offers the Master in Population Sciences (MPS) degree programme. The students are encouraged to have an in-depth understanding of the complexities of population processes, including fertility, family planning, morbidity, mortality, migration, urbanisation, demographic dividend, family formation, and the relationships between such processes and broader social and economic contexts and trends. This multidisciplinary programme, while maintaining its core of basic demographic features, includes new areas such as reproductive health, HIV/AIDS, and current aspects of traditional population topics such as aging, adolescence, gender, and the environment. The relationships and differentials between many aspects of population, such as health, education, fertility, mortality, economics of household structure, economic development, and population growth, poverty, status of women, and development, are the main focus.

== Fostering information exchange ==
PIDE conducts a variety of programmes and activities designed to support dialogue and information exchange among researchers, practitioners, and policy makers. It includes the Annual General Meeting and Conference of the Pakistan Society of Development Economists (PSDE), lectures, conferences, workshops, and seminars.

=== Annual general meeting and conference of the PSDE ===
Pakistan Society of Development Economists (PSDE), established in 1982 under the Societies Registration Act of 1860, provides an institutional framework for the dissemination of the fruits of research among scholars, public officials, and policy-makers dealing with economic matters. The Society's current membership of more than four hundred includes Nobel Laureates, academics, administrators, and other members working in all the different continents of the world.

The Society holds its annual meetings regularly. The Annual General Meeting and Conference of the Society is an occasion for stock-taking of the work done at PIDE and elsewhere on various socioeconomic problems of Pakistan, the region, and the world, as well as for suggesting new initiatives for further research. These meetings provide for the much-needed communication amongst the economics professionals, policy-makers, and various schools of interested observers of the ongoing debate concerning development-related issues. Twenty one such meetings have been held thus far, with over 600 papers presented in areas such as agriculture, industry, international trade and exchange rates, fiscal and monetary economics, project appraisals, demography, human resource development, resource mobilisation, debt, governance, gender, poverty, structural adjustment, and Islamic economics. The papers presented in the meetings are subsequently published in the Papers and Proceedings issue of The Pakistan Development Review.

The highlights of the PSDE meetings are the Distinguished Lectures. Three of these are Memorial Lectures dedicated to the memory of the Quaid-i-Azam, Mohammad Ali Jinnah, the founder of Pakistan, Mohammad Iqbal, poet-philosopher, and Mahbub ul Haq, economist. The Distinguished Speaker list in different years has had on it such names as Lawrence R. Klein (Nobel Laureate), Sir Hans W. Singer, E. Malinvaud, Paul P. Streeten, Ansley J. Coale, David P. Laidler, Robert

=== Lecture series ===
A lecture series, entitled “Lectures in Development Economics”, was instituted many years ago. Twenty-three lectures in this series have been delivered so far; eminent economists, demographers, and other social scientists have been on the speakers’ list. Many of these lectures have already been published by PIDE. Another seminar series on public policy issues was initiated in June 2002, which analysed the current policy issues. The new PIDE Lectures Series attracts major new contributions to various fields.

=== Conferences and workshops ===
A new series of conferences and workshops has been launched at PIDE for discussion and exchange of information. The main objective of the round-table conferences based on the new themes introduced at PIDE is to provide a forum for discussion to identify research issues in the area that the Institute and other researchers may follow. The objective of the workshops is to share findings of the studies on current issues in Pakistan. The proceedings of these conferences and workshops are available at PIDE's website.

=== PIDE Viewpoint—Seminar Series ===
The Pakistan Institute of Development Economics initiated in 2006 a weekly seminar series to stimulate intellectual thought for development discourse. A similar PIDE Viewpoint—Seminar Series has been in place since early 2008. The seminars are open to policymakers, researchers, planners, practitioners, educators, individuals from the public and private organisations, and students. The series covers a variety of subjects and issues in the field of economics and other social sciences.

=== Training and Project Evaluation Division ===
The Training and Project Evaluation Division conducts specialised in-service training courses in Economic Planning and Management for development practitioners working in government or semi-government departments and in autonomous development organisations. The objective is to develop the operational skills of the participants so that they can successfully plan and assess all aspects of development projects. It covers all sectors of the economy such as agriculture, industry, livestock, water, power, transport, education, and health.

Participants learn modern techniques to carry out financial, economic, and social evaluations of projects, as well as the methods for planning and implementing projects. The specified courses include Project Planning, Appraisal, Implementation, and Evaluation Techniques, Effective Communications Skills, Gender Mainstreaming, Macroeconomic Planning and Management, and Result-based Monitoring and Evaluation. Learning theory is combined with practical exercises, including monitoring of ongoing field activities. Training also involves lively group discussions and presentations of projects by the participants.

The division has added policy analysis courses in its programme since 1998. As PIDE is one of the institutes designated by the Government of Pakistan for promotion-related capacity building of civil servants of various occupational groups (BPS-17 and above), the number of courses to be administered at this campus has been increasing. The division has broad links and information-sharing channels with other national and international training institutes. Besides training, the division also contributes to research and development activities of PIDE through its projects and programmes.

== Publications ==
Through its publications and research information services, PIDE disseminates its research results country/worldwide. The Publications Division is responsible for all publishing undertaken by PIDE in the form of journals, books, newsletters, research reports, and monographs as well as miscellaneous publications for the academic programmes, the programmes of the PSDE, PIDE Seminar Series, and the training courses.

A number of joint publishing and production projects have also been completed in collaboration with other research organisations, notably the Friedrich Ebert Stiftung, Islamabad, the Indian Council for Research on International Economic Relations, New Delhi, the East-West Centre, Honolulu, the International Centre for Economic Growth, San Francisco, the Centre for Development Planning, Erasmus University, Rotterdam, National Institute of Banking and Finance, Pakistan, the State Bank of Pakistan, the United Nations Population Fund, International Labour Organisation, and the United Nations Development Programme.

=== The Pakistan Development Review ===
Started at The Institute of Development Economics as Economic Digest in 1956, The Pakistan Development Review (PDR) has been published by the Institute regularly since 1961, with only a short pause during 1971-72. For several decades now, it has been a refereed international journal of Economics and related social sciences. Redesigned and re-planned twice in the last two decade, the contents have tended to emphasise theoretical-cum-empirical contributions; the underlying commitment has been to strengthen the interest in the general areas of Economics and other social science fields. The journal is issued quarterly and, with a fair mix of topics, regularly contains original (theoretical and empirical) contributions to Economics, in general, and on Pakistan's socio-economic problems, in particular. Nearly every issue carries contributions by scholars from Pakistan and overseas. Currently, the following editors work regularly on the PDR: Rashid Amjad (Editor), Aurangzeb A. Hashmi (Literary Editor), and Mir Annice Mahmood (Book Review Editor).

The Review's Editorial Board consists of thirty-five outstanding scholars in the field of Economics and various social science fields. They actively participate in refereeing the papers submitted to the Review for publication; they also render valuable advice on other related matters.

Most national and international indexing and abstracting services in the social sciences provide useful information about our publications. The contents of the PDR are abstracted/indexed regularly by several works of reference including International Bibliography of the Social Sciences, EconLit, e-JEL, JEL on CD, World Agricultural Economics and Rural Sociology Abstracts, Agricultural Engineering Abstracts, Asian-Pacific Economic Literature, Ekistic Index of Periodicals, Wheat, Barley and Triticale Abstracts, Tropical Oilseeds, Rice Abstracts, Population Index, International Labour Documentation, Bibliography of Asian Studies, Geo Abstracts, CABi, IORR Virtual Library, and Current Issues.

Occasionally, the PDR publishes special issues. For example, the Summer 1979 issue was devoted to a symposium on ‘Shadow Pricing’, while the Summer, Autumn, and Winter issues of 1980 were devoted to a symposium on ‘The State of Development Economics: Models and Realities’. More recent issues have carried current debates on social sciences research and the profession, while the Spring 2006 issue offers substantial focus on ‘Pakistan's Growth Strategy’. The journal's large subscriber list includes universities, libraries, and individual addresses in all parts of the world. Electronic access has been made possible by placing nearly all of the information about publications on the PIDE website.

=== Research reports and monographs ===
These series of publications by the PIDE go a long way back. More than 200 research reports and 20 monographs (including those written before the separation of East and West Pakistan) have been published. The first monograph was researched and written by John C. H. Fei and Gustav Ranis, titled A Study of Planning Methodology with special reference to Pakistan's Second Five Year Plan. A complete list of the Research Reports and Monographs is available on the PIDE website.

=== PIDE working papers ===
This series, based on the seminars presented at PIDE, has become vibrant and replaced the older Research Report series. Some recent titles are:

1. Dynamic Effects of Agriculture Trade in the Context of Domestic and Global Liberalisation: A CGE Analysis for Pakistan by Rizwana Siddiqui (2007).
2. Measures of Monetary Policy Stance: The Case of Pakistan by Sajawal Khan and Abdul Qayyum (2007).
3. Public Provision of Education and Government Spending in Pakistan by Muhammad Akram and Faheem Jehangir Khan(2007).
4. Household Budget Analysis for Pakistan under Varying the Parameter Approach by Eatzaz Ahmad and Muhammad Arshad (2007).
5. Pension and Social Security Schemes in Pakistan: Some Policy Options by Naushin Mahmood and Zafar Mueen Nasir(2008).
6. Public Social Services, and Capability Development: A Cross-district Analysis of Pakistan by Rizwana Siddiqui (2008).
7. Monetary Policy Transparency in Pakistan: An Independent Analysis by Wasim Shahid Malik and Musleh-ud Din (2008).
8. Bilateral J-Curves between Pakistan and Her Trading Partners by Zehra Aftab and Sajawal Khan (2008).
9. On Measuring the Complexity of Urban Living by Lubna Hasan (2008).

=== Books ===
PIDE is also a publisher of influential books. The first title, Investment of Oil Revenues, by M. L. Qureshi, was published in 1974, when the topic was just beginning to gain attention. A recent book, Gender and Empowerment: Evidence from Pakistan, by Rehana Siddiqui, et al. (2006), addresses current concerns. In the ‘Lectures’ series, two recent titles are: Beyond Planning and Mercantilism: An Evaluation of Pakistan's Growth Strategy by Nadeem Ul Haque (2006) and Brain Drain or Human Capital Flight by Nadeem Ul Haque (2005). Some of the well-known books published by PIDE earlier are:

- The Population of Pakistan by M. Afzal, et al. (1974)
- An Analysis of Real Wages in the Government Sector, 1971–76 by Syed Nawab Haider Naqvi (1977)
- An Agenda for Islamic Economic Reform by Syed Nawab Haider Naqvi (1980, reprinted in 1989)
- The PIDE Macro-econometric Model of Pakistan's Economy(Vol 1) by Syed Nawab Haider Naqvi, A. H. Khan, Nasir M. Khilji and Ather M. Ahmed (1983)
- Pakistan's Economy through the Seventies by Syed Nawab Haider Naqvi and Khwaja Sarmad (1984)
- Land Reforms in Pakistan: A Historical Perspective by Syed Nawab Haider Naqvi, Mahmood Hasan Khan, and M. Ghaffar Chaudhry (1987)
- Agricultural Growth and Employment by John W. Mellor (1988)
- Population and Development by Ansley J. Coale (1990)
- Pakistan's Economic Situation and Future Prospects by Ejaz Ahmed Naik (1993)
- Poverty and Rural Credit: The Case of Pakistan by Sohail J.Malik (1999)
- Public Sector Efficiency: Perspectives on Civil Service Reform by Nadeem Ul Haque and Musleh-ud Din (2006)
- Cities—Engines of Growth by Nadeem Ul Haque and Durr-e-Nayab (2007)
- Energy Issues in Pakistan by Mir Annice Mahmood (2008)
- PIDE Research in Print 1957–2007 by Zafar Javed Naqvi(2008)
- PIDE—from a Think Tank to a University: A Brief History by S.M. Naseem (2008)
- PIDE's Contribution to Development Thinking: The Earlier Phase by A. R. Khan (2008)

=== Other publications ===
Apart from the regular series of publications, PIDE also publishes occasionally Project Reports, Statistical Papers, essays, and lectures. PIDE Tidings ceased awhile ago. A bimonthly newsletter, PIDE Focus, now communicates PIDE's activities to people. PIDE Policy Viewpoint is also a new series drawing and inviting attention and contributions. Details about publications can be viewed at the PIDE website.
