= Rasul Jan =

Pakistani chemist

Muhammad Rasul Jan
- Born: 24 June 1952 (age 74); Ningolai, Kabal, Swat District, Pakistan
- Education: University of Peshawar; University College Cork; University College Dublin; New Mexico State University; Arizona State University
- Known for: Contribution in Electroanalytical chemistry,
- Awards: Fulbright Award (2003); Pride of Performance in Science (2010); Sitara-e-Imtiaz (2016)
- Scientific career
- Fields: Analytical chemistry
- Workplaces: University of Poonch; University of Peshawar; University of Malakand

Muhammad Rasul Jan is a Pakistani chemist in the field of analytical chemistry. He served as Vice-Chancellor of University of Malakand from 14 April 2008 till 1 October 2012. He also served as Vice-Chancellor at University of Peshawar and currently he is serving as Vice-Chancellor at the University of Poonch in Rawalakot, Azad Kashmir. He has published extensively in national and international journals and has supervised many M.Phil. and PhD scholars in the field of Analytical Chemistry.

== Education and life ==
Jan was born in the village of Ningolai in Kabal of Swat District, Pakistan and studied chemistry at the University of Peshawar, obtaining an M.Phil. Dr.Jan obtained his PhD from University College Cork, followed by three years Post-Doctoral work in the University College Dublin, in the Republic of Ireland. Returning to Pakistan in 1985, he joined the Department of Chemistry at the University of Peshawar as assistant professor. In 1999 he was appointed as head of the Department of Environmental Sciences. He held a Fulbright Program fellowship at the New Mexico State University in 2003. He worked in Bio-Design institute at Arizona State University, United States. He was awarded Pride of Performance (2010) and Sitara-e-Imtiaz (2016) in Science by the president of Islamic Republic of Pakistan.

== Research publications ==
- Jasmin Shah, M. Rasul Jan and Fazal Mabood, "Conversion of waste tyre into liquid hydrocarbons via base catalysis" Iranian Journal of Chemistry and Chemical Engineering(IJCCE) 27(2) (2008)
- Jasmin Shah, M. Rasul Jan and Fozia Rehman, "Extractive spectrophotometric method for determination of sulpiride in pharmaceutical formulations", American Laboratory 3(4) 8-10 (2008)
- M. Rasul Jan, Jasmin Shah and Nadia Bashir, " Flow Injection Spectrophotometric Determination of Acetochlor in food samples", American Laboratory 40(7) 12-16 (2008)
- M. Rasul Jan, Jasmin shah and Abdur Rahim, "Recovery of styrene monomer from waste polystyrene using catalytic degradation", American Laboratory 40 (4) 12-14 (2008)
- M. Rasul Jan, Jasmin Shah and Nadia Bashir, "Flow Injection Spectrophotometric Determination of Chloramben" International Journal of Environmental and Analytical Chemistry (IJEAC) 88 (1) 27-35 (2008)
- Jasmin Shah, M. Rasul Jan and Fazal Mabood, "Catalytic conversion of waste tyres into valuable liquid fuels, Journal of Polymer and Environment 15 (3) 207-211 (2007)
- Jasmin Shah, M. Rasul Jan, Fazal Mabood and M. Shahid, "Preparation and Characterization of Carbon Black from Waste Tires and Their Utilization as Adsorbent" Journal of the Chinese Chemical society, 53 (5) 1085-1089 (2006)
- Jasmin Shah, M. Rasul Jan and Nadia Bashir, "Flow Injection Spectrophotometric Determination of 2,4-Dichlorophenoxy acetic acid Herbicide" Journal of the Chinese Chemical Society, 53 (4) 845-850 (2006)
- Nina G. Dolinnaya, Mohammad Rasul Jan, Abdel Nasser Kawde, Tatiana S. Oretskaya, Vadim N. Tashlitsky and Joseph Wang". Electrochemical Detection of A basic Site Containing DNA" Electroanalysis, 18(4) 399(2006)
- M. Rasul Jan, Jasmin Shah and Nadia Bashir, "Flow injection spectrophotometric determination of bromoxynil herbicide by diazotization method" Analytical Sciences 22(1) 165 (2006)
- Jasmin Shah, M. Rasul Jan and Nadia Bashir, "Determination of Starane (Fluroxypyr) herbicide using flow injection spectrophotometry" Analytical Sciences 22(1) 145 (2006)
- Zafar Iqbal, Mir Azam Khan, M. Rasul Jan, Jasmin Shah, Waqar Ahmad and Zia-ul- Haq, "New Spectrophotometric Method for Lactulose Determination in Pharmaceutical Preparations" Journal of Analytical Chemistry (Russian) 61(1), 32 (2006)
- Jasmin Shah, M. Rasul Jan, Mir Azam Khan and Sajad Amin, "Spectrophotometric Determination of Metoclopramide in Pharmaceutical Preparations" Journal of Analytical Chemistry, 60(7) 711-714(2005)
- Jasmin Shah, M. Rasul Jan and Mir Azam Khan, "Investigation of New Spectrophotometric Method for Analysis of Furosemide in Various Pharmaceutical Preparation" Journal of the Chinese Chemical Society, 52(2) 347-352(2005)
- Jasmin Shah, M. Rasul Jan, M. Nafees, S. Noureen and N. Bhatti, "Multiresidue Analysis of Pesticides in Fresh Fruits Marketed in Peshawar, Pakistan" American Laboratory 37,22 (2005)
- Jasmin Shah, M. Rasul Jan and Zahid Hussain, "Catalytic Pyrolysis of Low Density Polyethylene with Lead Sulfide into Fuel Oil" Polymer Degradation and Stability 87 (2) 329-333 (2005)
- Joseph Wang, Abdel-Nasser Kawde and M. Rasul Jan, "Carbon-Nanotube-Modified Electrodes for Amplified Enzyme-Based Electrical Detection of DNA Hybridization" Biosensors and Bioelectronics, 20, 995-1000 (2004)
- G. Liu, Joseph Wang, J. Kim, M. Rasul Jan and G.E. Collins, "Electrochemical coding for multiplexed immunoassays of proteins" Analytical Chemistry, 76, 7126-7130 (2004)
- M. Rasul Jan, Joseph Wang and Guodong Liu, "Highly Selective Electrochemical Enzyme-Linked Immunoassay Based in Alkaline Phosphatase Loaded Carbon Nanotube and Carbon Nanotube Modified Electrode" Chemical Sensors, 20 (Suppl. B), 222-223 (2004)
- Mir Azam Khan, Mohammad Rasul Jan, Jasmin Shah, Zafar Iqbal and Hamayun Khan, "Spectrophotometric Determination of Lactulose in Pharmaceutical Preparations Using Acid Hydrolysis" American Laboratory, 36(14), 41 44 (2004
