= Hilal-e-Imtiaz =

Second-highest civilian award of Pakistan

Hilal-e-Imtiaz ہلالِ امتیاز
- Hilāl-e-Imtiāz

Awarded by Government of Pakistan
- Type: Award
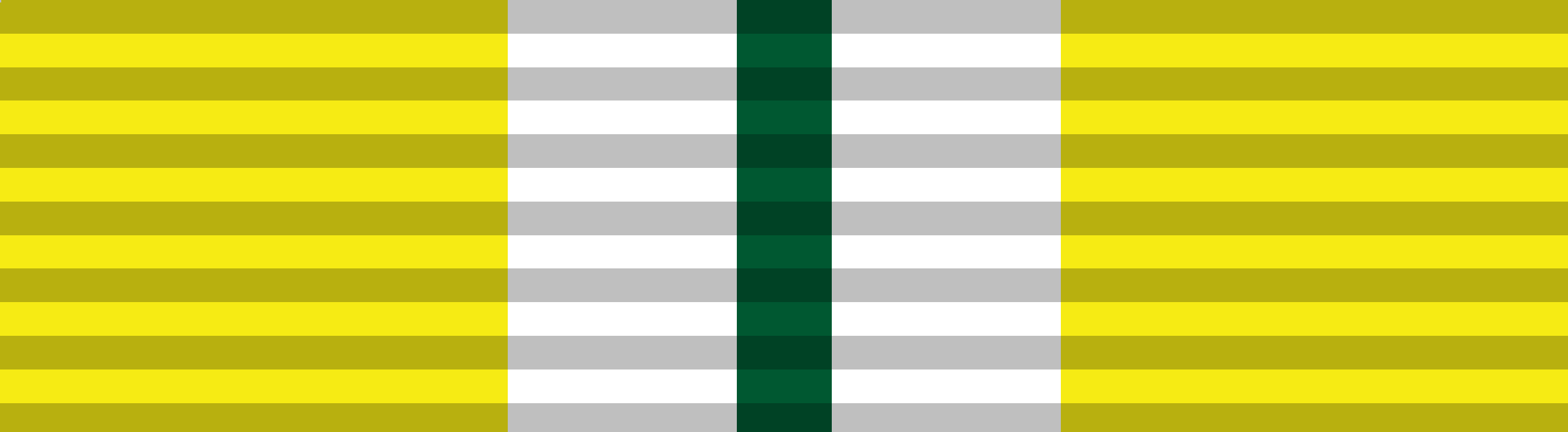
- Ribbon: Hilal-e-Imtiaz (Civilian) Hilal-e-Imtiaz (Military)
- Eligibility: Pakistani or Foreign citizen
- Awarded for: The highest degree of service to the state, and for services to international diplomacy.
- Status: Currently constituted
- Sovereign: President of Pakistan
- Grand Master: Prime minister of Pakistan
- Grades: 5 grade: Star (1st Class); Badge (Second Class); Ribbon (military only); Collar Chain (4th class); Medal (5th Class)

Statistics
- First induction: 19 March 1957

Precedence
- Next (higher): Nishan-e-Imtiaz

- Next (lower): Sitara-e-Imtiaz

The Hilal-e-Imtiaz (Urdu: ہلالِ امتیاز, lit. 'Crescent of Excellence'; pronounced [hɪ.lɑː.lɪ ɪm.t̪ɪ.jɑːz]), also spelled as Hilal-i-Imtiaz, is the second-highest (in the order of "Imtiaz") civilian award and honour given to both civilians and military officers of the Pakistan Armed Forces by the Government of Pakistan. It recognises individuals who have made an "especially meritorious contribution to the security or national interests of Pakistan, world peace, cultural or other significant public endeavors". It is a civilian award, and not limited to the citizens of Pakistan.

The honour is restricted to individuals who have made outstanding contributions in their fields that led to international recognition for the state. It is awarded in the fields of literature, arts, sports, medicine and science for civilians. It is announced every year on Independence Day (14 August), and given on Pakistan Day, 23 March, by the President of Pakistan.

For officers in the military, it is given for distinguished service. The first Hilal-e-Imtiaz Military in the history of Pakistan was awarded by PM ZA Bhutto to 4 star General Zia ul Haq after Zia was appointed Chief of the Army in 1976. Initially awarded exclusively to officers reporting directly to the Secretary of Defense, after 1979 it began to be awarded in a new format to officers who were up to two steps removed from the Secretary of Defense, such as Major General or Lieutenant General (Army), Air Vice-Marshals or Air Marshals (Air Force) and Rear-Admiral or Vice-Admiral (Navy, Coast Guard, and Marines). The Parliament's committee for award and recognition services selects the names of individuals and sends their report to the prime minister; on his advice, the president announces the awards in a ceremony that is broadcast by PTV. The award is usually given to individuals, not groups, because the purpose of the award is to recognise the recipients' individual contributions.

The award is a disc of golden jasminum between the five points of a pure gold star. The star has additional bright jasminum; in its centre there is a green emerald with a golden crescent.

A special grade of the medal has a larger execution of the same medal design worn as a star on the left of the chest. In addition, it is worn as a sash on the right shoulder, with its rosette (yellow with white for civilians and green for military officers) and white and yellow edge bearing the central disc of the medal at its centre, resting on the left hip. At the ceremony, both medals can be worn at the same time according to their achievements. The medal is suspended on a dark green ribbon with a light yellow and white central stripe and white edge stripes.

Military officers who receive the award are given a Non-Prohibited Bore Arms License.

== Grades of the Order of Imtiaz ==
This award is the 2nd Grade in the Order of Imtiaz (Excellence). The four Grades in the Order of Imtiaz are:

1. Nishan-e-Imtiaz (Order of Excellence; Urdu: نشانِ امتیاز)
2. Hilal-e-Imtiaz (Crescent of Excellence; Urdu: ہلالِ امتیاز)
3. Sitara-e-Imtiaz (Star of Excellence; Urdu: ستارہ امتیاز)
4. Tamgha-e-Imtiaz (Medal of Excellence; Urdu: تمغہِ امتیاز).

ORDER OF IMTIAZ (CIVILIAN)
Nishan-e-Imtiaz	Hilal-e-Imtiaz	Sitara-e-Imtiaz	Tamgha-e-Imtiaz

ORDER OF IMTIAZ (MILITARY)
Nishan-e-Imtiaz	Hilal-e-Imtiaz	Sitara-e-Imtiaz	Tamgha-e-Imtiaz

== Service Ribbon insignia ==
The ribbon for the Hilal-e-Imtiaz (Civilian) is:

- Yellow with a white centre band and a narrow Pakistan Green stripe in the middle.

The ribbon for the Hilal-e-Imtiaz (Military) is:

- White edges with Pakistan Green centre band and a single white stripe in the middle.

== Recipients ==
Statistics (Note: Awards presented on Pakistan Day are recorded under the previous year's column. For instance, awards granted in March 2023 are listed in the 2022 column.)
Year	2017	2018	2019	2020	2021	2022	2023	2024	2025
Military	48	46	44	50	45	23	23	23	
Civilian	7	8	4	2	6	18	26	11	12

=== List ===
- Moazzam Jah Ansari (2025), for his dedication to Public Service
- Sadia Rashid (2024), Educationist
- Arshad Nadeem (2024), Athlete, Olympic gold medallist in Javelin throw
- Cardinal Joseph Coutts (2024)
- Major General Sheharyar Parvez Butt (2024)
- Shahid Mahmood Baig, FPAS (2023), for contributions in the field of Science
- Former Ambassador Syed Tariq Fatemi (2023) for his dedication to Public Service
- Adil Najam (2023), for contributions to Environment and Education
- Syed Babar Ali (2023), Philanthropist
- Rahat Fateh Ali Khan (2023), Singer and Qawalli
- Amjad Saqib (2024), Social Development
- Amjad Islam Amjad (2022), Poet
- Bilquis Edhi (2022)
- Li Xiaopeng (2022) former Minister of Transport of the People's Republic of China
- Rohail Hyatt (2021)
- Kishwar Naheed (2021)
- Asif Mahmood Jah (2021)
- Song Tao (2020) Director of the Taiwan Affairs Office of the State Council/Taiwan Work Office of the Central Committee of the CCP
- Lieutenant General Mohammad Asad Durrani (Director General Inter-Services Intelligence)
- Abdul Bari Khan (2019)
- Zaheer Ayub Baig (2019)
- Ghulam Asghar (2019)
- Tasawar Hayat (2019)
- Wasim Akram (2019)
- Waqar Younis (2019)
- Recep Akdag (Turkey-2019)
- Michael Jansen (Germany-2019)
- Hussain Dawood (Business and Philanthropy) (2018)
- Rear Admiral Moazzam Ilyas (2015)
- Mahmood Qureshi (2013)
- Anwar Maqsood (Scriptwriter) (2013)
- Faiz Hameed (general) (2013)
- Abida Parveen (musician and Sufi music performer) (2013)
- Josh Malihabadi (1894–1982) Urdu poet (2013)
- Abdul Hafeez Kardar (1925–1996) former Pakistan Cricket Team captain (2013)
- Ansar Burney (Human and civil rights activist) (2013)
- Zia Mohyeddin (actor, television anchor and broadcaster) (2013)
- Azhar Abbas (journalist) (2013)
- Khalid Abbas Dar (actor, playwright, anchor, entertainer, director, theatre producer, mimic) (2013)
- Abdul Halim Mohd Hanifah (Royal Brunei Navy commander) (2012)
- Muhammad Iqbal Choudhary (Organic chemist) (2007)
- Iftikhar Arif (poet, scholar and literary critic) (2006)
- Ashfaq Ahmed (1925–2004) (writer, playwright and television broadcaster) (2006)
- Halbi Mohd Yusof (Royal Brunei Armed Forces commander) (2006)
- Faridullah Khan (politician) (2005)
- Mushtaq Ahmed Yousfi (writer) (2002)
- Jansher Khan (Squash Legend) (1997)
- Imran Khan (Sports) 1992
- A. Q. Khan (Nuclear scientist) 1989
- Munir Ahmad Khan (Nuclear Science) 1989
- Lieutenant General Mian Muhammad Afzaal (Shaheed) (Military) 1987
- Hamoodur Rahman (academic) 1984
- Ruth Pfau (Humanitarian) 1979
- Major General S A Nawab (Military) 1979
- Admiral Mohammad Shariff (Military) 1979
- General Zia ul Haq (Military) 1976
- Lt. Gen Ghulam Safdar Butt (Military) 1982
- Anwar Masood (2024), Poet

== See also ==
- Civil decorations of Pakistan
