= Gertrude Lemmens =

Dutch nun

- Born: 1 July 1914; Venray, Netherlands
- Died: 27 October 2000 (aged 86); Karachi, Pakistan
- Other name: Truus
- Occupation: religious nun
- Years active: 1944-2000
- Organization: Franciscan Missionaries of Christ the King
- Known for: Her work with the mentally handicapped, orphans and the aged
- Notable work: Founder of Dar-ul-Sukun (Home of Peace)
- Relatives: Salesius Lemmens (brother)
- Awards: Sitara-i-Quaid-i-Azam in 1989 by the President of Pakistan

Sister Gertrude (Truus) Lemmens (1 July 1914 – 30 October 2000) was a Dutch nun and founder of Dar-ul-Sukun (Home of Peace), a home for the mentally handicapped, orphans and the aged in Karachi, Pakistan.

She received an award from the President of Pakistan in 1989 for her work.

== Family ==
She was the sister of Father Salesius Lemmens OFM who served the city of Karachi from the mid-1930s until his death from accidental drowning in 1942 on an outing with the handicapped children. Young Sister Gertrude was already engaged to marry her fiancé back in the Netherlands who was a university professor there. Her fiancé came after her to Karachi to convince her and to go back with him. But Gertrude Lemmens strongly felt committed to her work in Karachi. She refused to go back and broke off the engagement. Later she once explained that her fiancé had felt terrible but he was not angry.

== Background ==
In October 1939, at the age of 25, Lemmens traveled from her hometown of Venray in the Netherlands to visit her brother, Father Salesius Lemmens OFM, who was a missionary priest serving what, at that time, were the Sindh and Baluchistan provinces of British India, but today are part of Pakistan. She had accompanied her brother for a month on his rounds of social work in under-privileged communities of Karachi. She came to be tremendously moved by how poor and needy some people were. After her return to her homeland, she felt compelled to live in a way which helped those in such poverty as she had seen. She returned to Karachi and joined the only indigenous religious institute of Sisters in the region, the Franciscan Missionaries of Christ the King.

== Career ==
She then made a commitment to the dispossessed of the country, touring the slums of Karachi and reaching out with her heart and mind to anybody who needed her help. She also taught at Christ the King School in Khudadad Colony in the morning and went out to do social work in the slums of the city in the afternoons. She learned Urdu language, the national language of Pakistan, to be able to communicate better with the local people. She was particularly concerned with the treatment of the intellectually disabled, victims in the vicious pecking order of society. Due to the outbreak of World War II by then, communication with her homeland had become difficult, and she was able to return for a visit only in 1957. It was an experience which strengthened her commitment to the suffering of the people in Karachi.

== Darul Sukun ==
In 1969 Archbishop Joseph Cordeiro, then the head of the Archdiocese of Karachi, bought a single-story property on Kashmir Road to start an English-medium school. Sister Gertrude begged and pleaded with him to convince him instead to let her utilize the property as a home for the mentally handicapped. He agreed, and Dar-ul-Sukun was created.

Sister Gertrude accepted anyone and everyone, so that, far from being simply a home for the mentally handicapped, Dar-ul-Sukun became a beacon of hope for all in need. Orphans, the old and destitute, the physically handicapped, disfigured babies all came to the home or were left on its doorstep. Realizing that one center could not possibly cope with such diverse demands, Dar-ul-Sukun spawned a network of homes including a home for orphan boys called Dugout, one for the old and destitute called Peace Haven, and Janiville for children from broken homes. A chapter of Dar-ul-Sukun as the home for the physically handicapped operates in Lahore also.

In 1970, Sister Gertrude again traveled back to Holland and made TV appearances and newspaper appeals for aid for her struggling home. With help from philanthropists and from Dutch companies like KLM, they managed to scrape by. The home continues to be supported by the Dutch people with approximately half a million euro being collected to finance the project between 2004 and 2008.

After Gertrude's death in 2000, Sister Ruth Lewis has been in charge of the institution.

== Awards and recognition ==
Over time, Sister Gertrude came to be described as the "Mother Teresa of Pakistan" or the Angel of Karachi. In recognition of her work for the homeless, the needy, and the handicapped, she received the Sitara-i-Quaid-i-Azam (Star of the Great Leader) Award on 23 March 1989, from the President of Pakistan, one of the highest honors given to foreign nationals. President Ghulam Ishaq Khan and Prime Minister Benazir Bhutto attended the ceremony.

== Death ==
Sister Gertrude died on 27 October 2000 at age 86, and was buried on 1 November, which was the sixty-fourth anniversary of her first arrival in British India. According to an obituary, her colleagues described her as loveable, warm and full of humour. "Her face beamed from her pictures on the mantle in the lounge of Dar-ul-Sukun".
