= University of Malakand =

Public university in Khyber Pakhtunkhwa, Pakistan

- جامعہ مالاکنڈ ملاکنډ پوهنتون
- An aerial view of Malakand University
- Other name: UoM
- Motto: Bridging the gap between aspirations and achievements.
- Motto in English: University at Glance...
- Type: Public
- Established: 2001; 25 years ago
- Accreditation: Higher Education Commission of Pakistan
- Chancellor: Governor of Khyber Pakhtunkhwa
- Vice-Chancellor: Rashid Ahmad
- Provost: Muhammad Shoaib
- Director Administration: Ezzat Khan
- Administrative staff: Muhammad Nasim
- Students: 7500
- Undergraduates: 4300
- Postgraduates: ~700
- Doctoral students: 150
- Location: Chakdara, Lower Dir District, Khyber Pakhtunkhwa, Pakistan; 34°40′07″N 72°03′35″E
- Campus: Ramorra, Chakdara
- Colours: Green, gold, cyan
- Website: uom.edu.pk

The University of Malakand (Urdu: یونیورسٹی آف ملاکنڈ; Pashto: ملاکنډ پوهنتون; abbreviated as UOM) is a Public Sector University located in the Lower Dir District of Khyber Pakhtunkhwa, Pakistan. Founded in 2001, the university offers undergraduate and postgraduate programmes in various academic disciplines. In 2010, the university was ranked "seventh" in the general category in Pakistan by the Higher Education Commission of Pakistan.

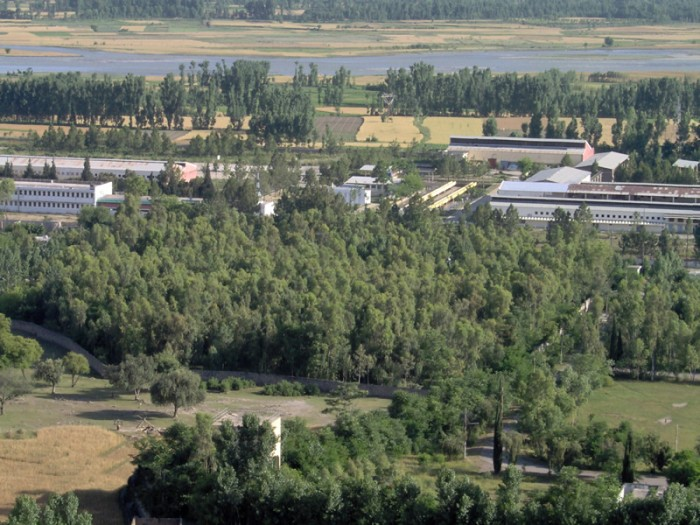
University of Malakand

== Background ==
The need for a university in Malakand Division had been felt since 1972, as the area had remained underprivileged for a long time but the idea could not be materialized until 2001. In 2001, It was established through a charter issued by the Governor Khyber Pakhtunkhwa on August 30, 2001, and it was recognised by the Higher Education Commission of Islamabad. The university has acquired more land reaching nearly 121.4 hectares (surrounded by fenced boundary walls (about 7 km). The university is located in the center hub of the Malakand Division of Khyber Pakhtunkhwa, linked with the District Swat, Lower and Upper Dir, Chitral, and Malakand.

== Distinctions ==
The 2020 QS world rankings placed the University of Malakand as the top university in Khyber Pakhtunkhwa, ninth highest (and overall 17th) in Pakistan, and among the top 351–400 in Asia.

== Vice Chancellors ==
1. Prof. Dr. Jehandar Shah (December 2001 – 2007)
2. Prof. Dr. Mohammad Iqbal (September 2007 − April 2008)
3. Prof. Dr. Rasul Jan (April 2008 − 2013)
4. Prof. Dr. Johar Ali (2013–2017)
5. Prof. Dr. Rahmat Ali (November 2017)
6. Prof. Dr. Gul Zaman (October 2017 – December 2021)
7. Prof. Dr. Rashid Ahmad (December 2021 – present)

== Convocations ==
The convocations for the Bachelor of Science (Hons) and Bachelor of Arts (Hons) have been held on the following dates:

1. Session (2001–2005), Date 10 Feb 2007
2. Session (2002–2006),
3. Session (2003–2007),
4. Session (2004–2008), Date 28 June 2012
5. Session (2005–2009),
6. Session (2006–2010),
7. Session (2007–2011), Date 15 Oct 2012

Currently, Master of Science and Master of Arts programmes are also ongoing but no convocation has been held for them.

== Departments ==
1. Department of Chemistry
2. Department of Biotechnology
3. Department of Biochemistry
4. Department of Botany
5. Department of Computer Science & IT
6. Department of Economics
7. Department of Education
8. Department of English
9. Department of Geology
10. Department of Islamic Studies
11. Department of Journalism and Mass Communication
12. Department of Law
13. Department of Management Studies
14. Department of Mathematics
15. Department of Pashto and Oriental Languages
16. Department of Political Science
17. Department of Pharmacy
18. Department of Physics
19. Department of Psychology
20. Department of Sociology/Social Work
21. Department of Software Engineering
22. Department of Statistics
23. Department of Tourism and Hotel Management
24. Department of Zoology
