= Schoonoord, Alverna =

Windmill in Gelderland, Netherlands

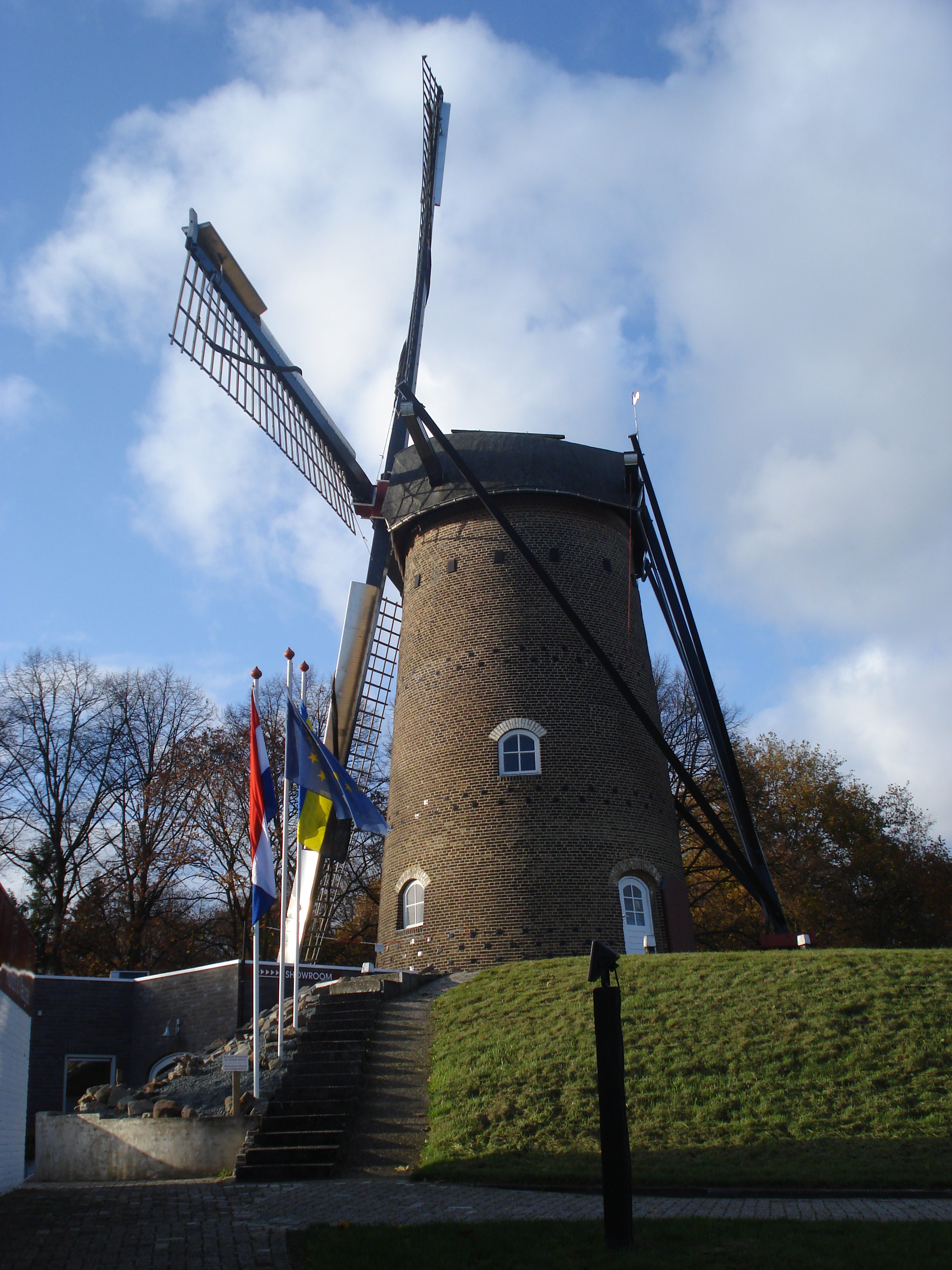
- Schoonoord, November 2007
- Interactive map of Schoonoord, Alverna

Origin
- Mill name: Schoonoord
- Mill location: Valendriesweg 301, 6603 AC, Alverna
- Coordinates: 51°48′07″N 5°45′14″E
- Year built: 1887

Information
- Purpose: Corn mill
- Type: Tower mill
- Storeys: Three storeys
- No. of sails: Four sails
- Type of sails: Common sails, leading edges on the Van Bussel system
- Windshaft: Cast iron
- Winding: Tailpole and winch
- No. of pairs of millstones: Two pairs
- Size of millstones: 1.50 metres (4 ft 11 in) diameter

Schoonoord is a tower mill in Alverna, Gelderland, Netherlands, which was built in 1887 and is in working order. The mill is listed as a Rijksmonument.

== History ==
The first mill on the site was a post mill that was built c.1868. It burnt down in 1887. Schoonoord was built to replace it. Its first owner was A van der Heijden. In 1917, ownership passed to G Jansen. In 1923, F A Koning was the owner.

On 14 November 1940, the mill caught fire in a storm. Repairs were carried out by millwrights Adriaens of Weert, Limburg. The mill ceased working in 1944. F A Koning was followed by Carolus and Cornelis Koning in 1946 and J P J Loeffen in 1949. Restorations were carried out in 1965 and 1987, but neither of these returned the mill to working order. On 29 November 2003, the mill was again damaged in a fire. The cap was replaced in 2005 and new sails were fitted in March 2006. The mill is listed as a Rijksmonument, № 39639.

== Description ==
Schoonoord is what the Dutch describe as a "Beltmolen". It is a three-storey tower mill built into a mound. The cap is covered in dakleer. The mill is winded by tailpole and winch. The sails are Common sails. They have a span of 22.40 metres (73 ft 6 in). The sails are carried on a cast-iron windshaft, which was cast by Enthoven & Co. in 1861. The windshaft also carries the brake wheel which has 64 teeth. This drives the wallower (33 teeth) at the top of the upright shaft. At the bottom of the upright shaft is the great spur wheel, which has 78 cogs. The great spur wheel drives two pairs of 1.50 metres (4 ft 11 in) French Burr millstones via lantern pinion stone nuts which have 33 staves each.

== Public access ==
Schoonoord is open to the public by appointment.

== Gallery ==
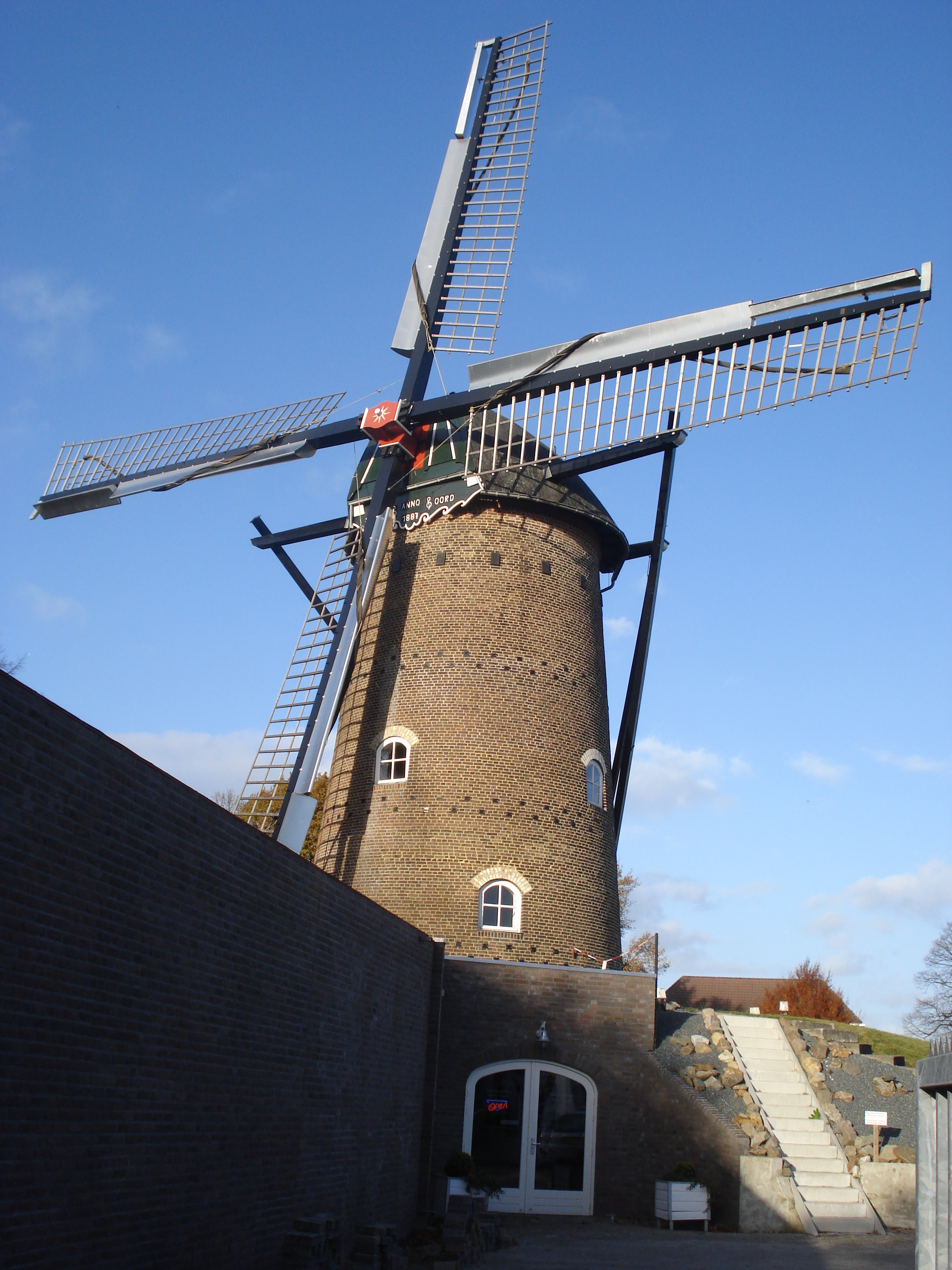
Another alternative view of Schoonoord.
