= Sitara-e-Imtiaz =

Third-highest civilian award of Pakistan

Sitara-e-Imtiaz ستارہِ امتیاز
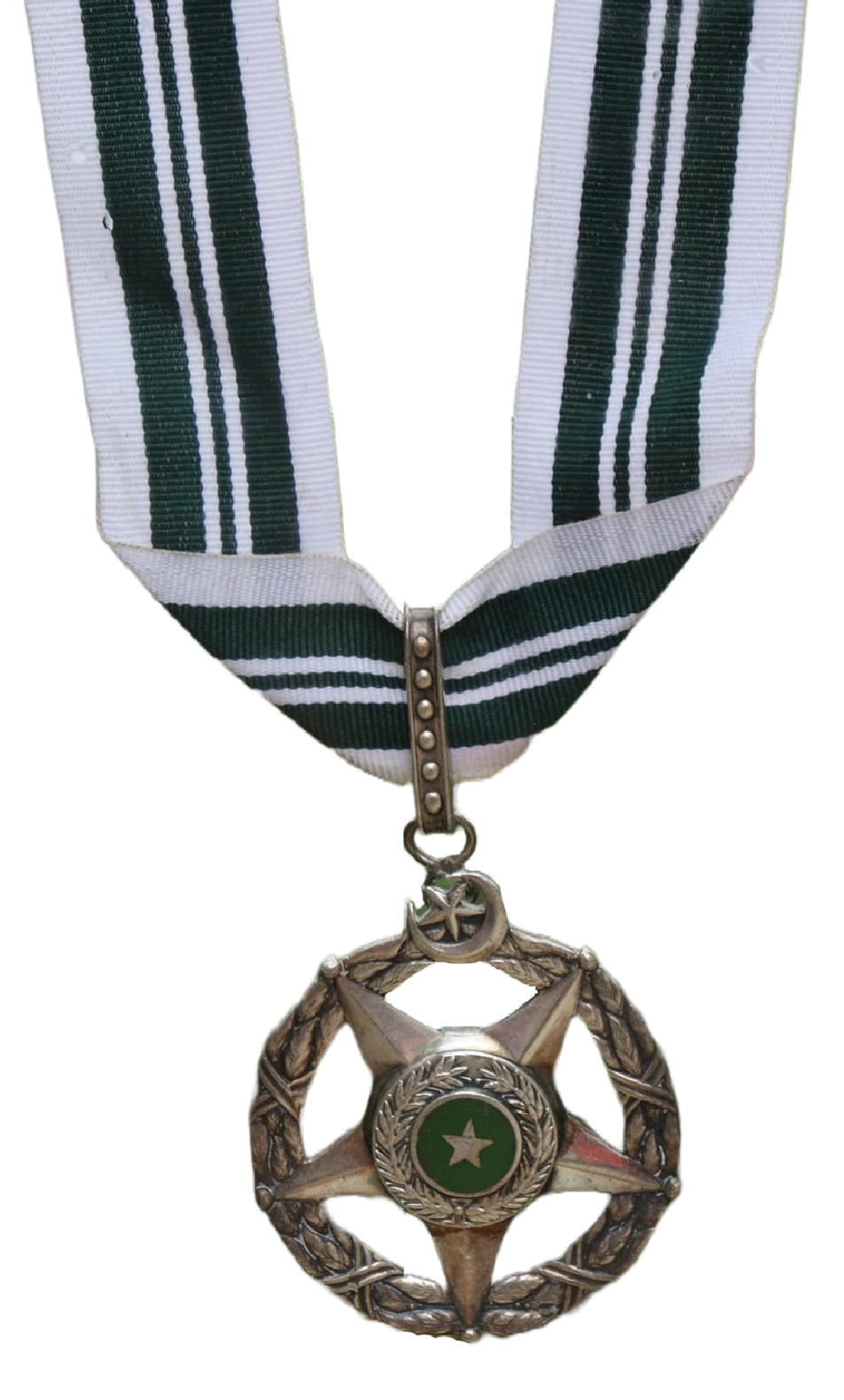
- Obverse Neck Medals for Left: Sitara-e-Imtiaz (Civilian); Right: Sitara-e-Imtiaz (Military)

Awarded by the President of Pakistan
- Type: Award
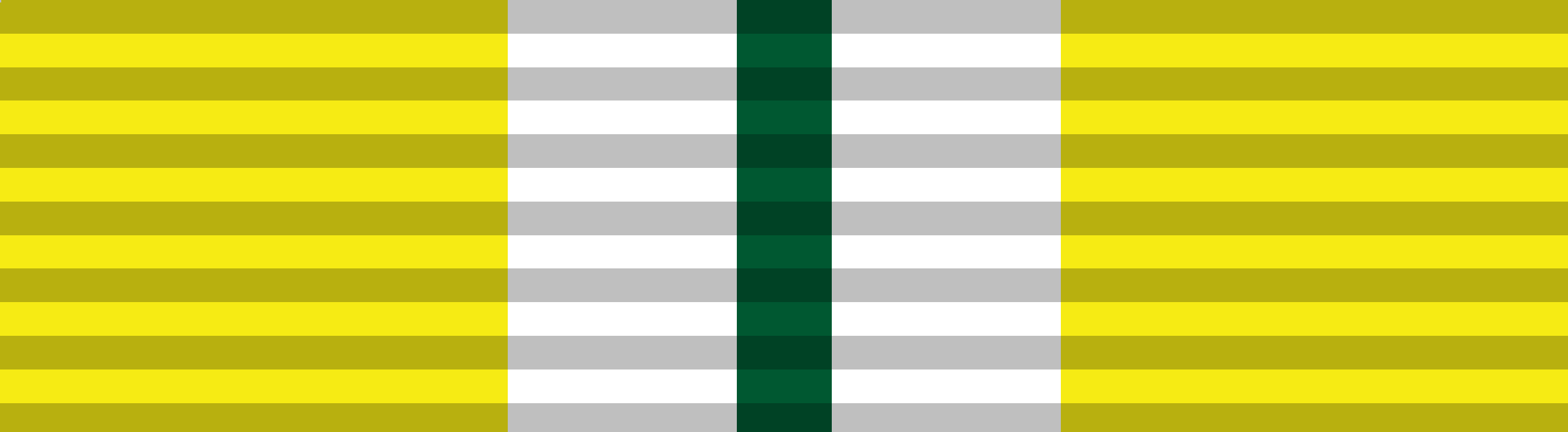
- Ribbon: Sitara-e-Imtiaz (Civilian) Sitara-e-Imtiaz (Military)
- Eligibility: Pakistani or Foreign citizen
- Awarded for: The highest degree of service to the state, and for services to international diplomacy.
- Status: Currently constituted
- Sovereign: President of Pakistan
- Sovereign: Prime minister of Pakistan

Statistics
- First induction: 19 March 1957

Precedence
- Next (higher): Hilal-e-Imtiaz

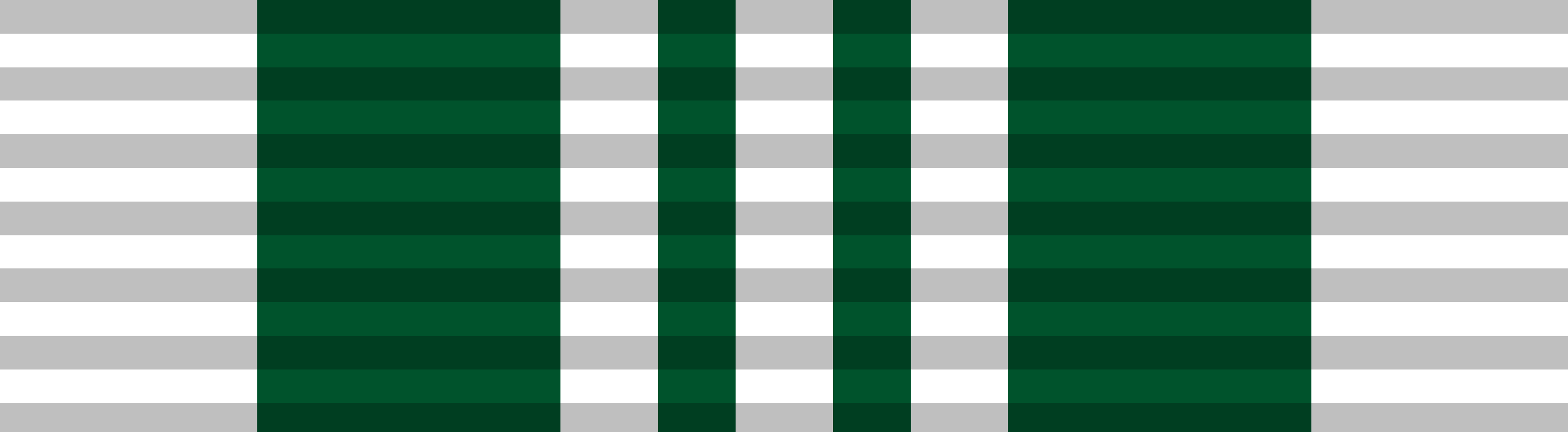
- Next (lower): Tamgha-e-Imtiaz

The Sitara-e-Imtiaz (Urdu: ستارہِ امتیاز, lit. 'Star of Excellence') also spelled Sitara-i-Imtiaz, is the third-highest (in the order of Imtiaz) honour and civilian award in the State of Pakistan. It recognizes individuals who have made an "especially meritorious contribution to the security or national interests of Pakistan, world peace, cultural or other significant public endeavours".

This award is not limited to the citizens of Pakistan, and it can also be awarded to foreign citizens based on their achievements and services done to the State of Pakistan (see Władysław Turowicz). While, it is a civilian award, it can also be awarded to military officers of the Pakistan Defence Forces worn on their uniform for recognition of their services to the country. Like other awards, it is a highly restricted and prestigious award only given to those who have done great services to the country. It is one of the most distinguished civil decorations to the civilians who have made outstanding contribution in their respected fields such as literature, arts, sports, medicine, or science, which prompted the recognition of the country on international level.

It is given to a person who has accomplished duty beyond what is assigned to them. To receive this honour, the individuals are expected to show eminence and be outstanding in providing excellent service in a significant field of activity beyond what they are assigned to.

For officers in the military, it is given after distinguished service, and is also the highest medal that can be awarded to those at the rank of Brigadier-General or Major-General in the Army, Air-Commodores or Air Vice-Marshals in the Air Force and Commodore or Rear-Admiral in the Navy, Coast Guard, and Marines.

The Parliament's Committee for Award and Recognition Services for State of Pakistan, selects the names of individuals and sends final report to the Prime minister of Pakistan. On advice of the Prime minister, the President organizes a colourful ceremony that is telecast and broadcast by the Pakistan Television Corporation. The award is usually given to individuals one by one and not in groups because the whole purpose of the award is to assess the recipient's individual capabilities in par excellence.

The award is a disc of golden Jasminum which stands between two and five points of the star, and is also of pure gold. The star is in the form of a five pointed star, with additional bright coloured Jasminum filling in space between points of the star. In the middle of the star, a well polished green emerald circumference fills the inside of the golden star. A smaller golden star is situated in the middle of the emerald field.

A special grade of the medal/award has larger execution of the same medal design worn as a star on the left chest. In addition, it is worn as a sash on the right shoulder, with its rosette (yellow with white (for civilians) or/ green (for military officers only) with white and yellow edge, bearing the central disc of the medal at its centre, resting on the left hip.

At the formal ceremony, both medals can be worn at the same time depending upon the individual's achievements. The medal is suspended on a ribbon, dark green colour with a light yellow and white central stripe with white edge stripes.

== Grades of the Order of Imtiaz ==
This award is the 3rd Grade in the Order of Imtiaz (Excellence). The four Grades in the Order of Imtiaz are:

1. Nishan-e-Imtiaz (Order of Excellence; Urdu: نشانِ امتیاز)
2. Hilal-e-Imtiaz (Crescent of Excellence; Urdu: ہلالِ امتیاز)
3. Sitara-e-Imtiaz (Star of Excellence; Urdu: ستارہ امتیاز)
4. Tamgha-e-Imtiaz (Medal of Excellence; Urdu: تمغہِ امتیاز).

ORDER OF IMTIAZ (CIVILIAN)
Nishan-e-Imtiaz	Hilal-e-Imtiaz	Sitara-e-Imtiaz	Tamgha-e-Imtiaz

ORDER OF IMTIAZ (MILITARY)
Nishan-e-Imtiaz	Hilal-e-Imtiaz	Sitara-e-Imtiaz	Tamgha-e-Imtiaz

== Serbice ribbon insignia ==
The service ribbon for the Sitara-e-Imtiaz (Civilian) is yellow with a white centre band and a narrow Pakistan Green stripe in the middle.

The ribbon for the Sitara-e-Imtiaz (Military) is white edges with Pakistan Green band on each side, two equal white stripes separated by an equal sized Pakistan Green stripe in the middle.

== Recipients of Sitara-e-Imtiaz ==
=== 1950s ===
- Lieutenant Colonel Shaukat Syed (1959)

=== 1960s ===
- Muhammad Enamul Huq (Bangladesh) (1962)
- Ahmad Hasan Dani (archaeologist, historian, and linguist)

=== 1970s ===
- Abdul Ghani Khan (Philosopher & Poet)

Abdul Ghani Khan

=== 1980s ===
- Ghulam Abbas Miana (1987, chemistry)
- Farman Fatephuri (linguist, writer, poet and editor) (1985)
- Khwaja Khurshid Anwar (film music director and musicologist) (1980)
- Brig. General Mian Muhammad Afzaal CGS (Shaheed) (later Lt. General) (1980)
- S. Muhib ur Rab (1980)
- Brig. Muhammad Salim (Army Medical Corps)
- Munier Choudhuri
- Abdul Ghani Khan (Philosopher & Poet) Abdul Ghani Khan
- Ghulam Ali (singer)
- A. R. Kemal (economist)
- Sayed Nafees al-Hussaini (calligrapher)
- Muhammad Abdullah (Islamic scholar)
- Allama Ghulam Mustafa Qasmi (Islamic scholar)
- Maulana Shamsul Haq Afghani (1980)
- Ayub Khan Ommaya (1981)
- A.Q Mughal
- Israr Ahmed (Islamic scholar & philosopher) 1981

=== 1990s ===
- Misbah-Ud-Din Shami (1990), crystallography
- Salim Mehmud (1990), significant contributions to SUPARCO
- Charis Waddy, writer (1990) for promoting understanding of Pakistan, and particularly its women, in the West
- William Brown, Pakistan Army
- Bapsi Sidhwa (writer) (1991)
- Javed Miandad (cricketer) (1992)
- Jansher Khan (squash player) (1993)
- Shamsul-hasan Shams Barelvi (1995)
- Group Capt Dr Muhammad Aslam Butt PAF (1998) for rendering meritorious services and significant contribution to science & engineering education in the PAF.
- Wazir Agha (writer)
- Abdul Majid (1999), significant contributions to SUPARCO
- Talib Jauhari (poet, philosopher, Muslim scholar of Shiite sect and orator )
- Munir Niazi (poet)
- Iqtedar Hussain Bhatti (1999)

=== 2001 ===
- Professor Doctor Allamah Nasir al-Din Nasir Hunzai (23rd March 2001) (Literature)

=== 2004 ===
- Iftikhar Ahmad, PSP, (DIG Police, Multan) (Punjab)
- Riazul Islam (historian)
- M. Sultan Farooqui
- Kazi Abdul Shakoor
- Faiz Muhammad Khan
- Manzoor Hussain Khan (engineering/metallurgy & material education)

=== 2005 ===
- Inzamam ul Haq (former Test captain) in 2005
- Professor Dr. Tahir Shafi

=== 2006 ===
- Liaquat H. Merchant (banking litigation, services rendered in health and education sectors)
- Mohammad Hussain Dadabhoy (2006)
- Dr Faiz Mohammad Khan (2006)
- Sultan Ali Allana (2006)

=== 2007 ===
- Abdul Samad Lasi (Moondra)
- A. R. Kemal
- Brig. Muhammad Mansur Aslam
- Brig. Tughral Yamin
- Dr. Matin Ahmed Khan
- Bob Woolmer (Coach of Pakistan National Cricket Team)

=== 2008 ===
- Azhar Mahmood (Federal Investigation Agency, Director FIA).

=== 2009 ===
- Brig. Ali Nasre Alam
- Brig Sohail Ahmed Qureshi
- Javed Ahmed Ghamidi
- Ayesha Jalal
- Asad Umar

=== 2010 ===
- Rahimullah Yusufzai
- Muhammad Amjad Saqib

=== 2011 ===
- Rear Admiral Moazzam Ilyas
- Saeed Akhtar (portrait painter)
- Engr. M.P. Gangwani (bureaucrat & social worker)
- Mohammad Yousuf (former Test player) in 2011
- Siraj ul Haq Memon (literature and journalism)

=== 2012 ===
- Aslam Azhar (pioneer of Pakistan Television Corporation)
- Mohammad Qavi Khan
- Shaista Zaid (English newscaster - Pakistan Television Corporation))

=== 2015 ===
- Shahid Mahmood Baig (science: genetic disorders in Pakistan)
- Niaz Ahmad Akhtar (education: engineering & technology)
- Asif Mahmood Jah
- Masood Ashar, (literature)
- Zahid Pervaiz, (public service)
- Col(R) Ayyaz Nasir
- Yasmin Tahir (arts: Compering)
- Umar Saif (Education: information technology)
- Mujahid Kamran (education)
- Rahat Ali Khan (music: classical & semi classical international singer)
- Saeed Ajmal (sports: cricket)
- Abdul Rashid Seyal (public service)
- Muhammad Parvez Masud (social services)
- Muhammad Younas Sheikh (social work)

=== 2016 ===
Hafeez ur Rehman Hoorani	science (physics)	Sindh, Pakistan
Muhammad Iqbal	science (biotechnology)	Punjab, Pakistan
Muhammad Aslam Noor	science (mathematics)	Punjab, Pakistan
Tariq Mahmood Fatik	engineering	Punjab, Pakistan
Munir Ahmad	engineering	Punjab, Pakistan
Ghulam Sarwar	engineering	Punjab, Pakistan
Nadeem Ghaffar	engineering	Punjab, Pakistan
Brig (R) Munawar Hussain	engineering	Punjab, Pakistan
Aleem Arshad	engineering	Punjab, Pakistan
Ayaz Ayub	engineering	Punjab, Pakistan
Khalid Naseeruddin Shaikh	engineering	Sindh, Pakistan
Nayyar Ali Dada	engineering	Punjab, Pakistan
Syed Ather Enam	medicine	Sindh, Pakistan
Mahboob Ali	medicine	
Eice Muhammad	medicine	
Mrs. Shahnaz Wazir Ali	education	
Mohammad Rasul Jan	science	KPK, Pakistan
Mohsin Raza	arts (music)	Punjab, Pakistan
Shahbaz Malik	literature	Punjab, Pakistan
Mustansar Hussain Tarar	literature	Punjab, Pakistan
Yussuf Shaheen Daudpota	literature	Sindh, Pakistan
Halil Toker	literature	Turkey
Luca Maria Olivieri	services to Pakistan	Italy
Nergis Mavalvala	services to Pakistan	USA
Yang Wei	services to Pakistan	China
Mushtaq Chhapra	public service	Sindh, Pakistan
Mian Ijaz ul Hassan	art	Punjab, Pakistan

=== 2017 ===
Sources:

- Raees Ahmed (arts, sitar)
- Yang Wei (China)
- Mustansar Hussain Tarar (travelogue writer, novelist)
- Hafeez-ur-Rehman Hoorani (physics)
- Muhammad Iqbal (biotechnology)
- Muhammad Aslam Noor (mathematics)
- Tariq Mahmood Fatik (engineering)
- Munir Ahmad (engineering)
- Ghulam Sarwar (engineering)
- Nadeem Ghaffar (engineering)
- Brig (R) Munawar Hussain (engineering)
- Aleem Arshad (engineering)
- Ayaz Ayub (engineering)
- Khalid Naseeruddin Shaikh (engineering)
- Nayyar Ali Dada (engineering)
- Syed Ather Enam (medicine)
- Dr Mahboob Ali (medicine)
- Eice Muhammad (medicine)
- Mrs. Shahnaz Wazir Ali (education)
- Mohammad Rasul Jan (science)

=== 2018 ===
- Zia Chishti (entrepreneur)
- Ashar Aziz
- Saira Afzal Tarar
- Ashtar Ausaf Ali
- Zahid Bashir
- Shahzad Roy
- Sarfraz Ahmed (cricketer)
- Shahid Afridi(cricketer)
- Misbah-ul-Haq (cricketer)
- Junaid Jamshed (singer)

=== 2019 ===
Shahzad Nasim	services to Pakistan	Singapore
Zaid Ahmed Al-Muhaisen	services to Pakistan	Jordan
Javed Iqbal	services to Pakistan	Punjab, Pakistan
Asif Mahmood	services to Pakistan	USA
Najeeb Ullah Ghauri	services to Pakistan	USA
Pavel Bem	services to Pakistan	Czech Republic
Selamic Kilic	services to Pakistan	Turkey
Berislav Gaso	services to Pakistan	Croatia
Zia Aftab	engineering (electronics)	Punjab, Pakistan
Safdar Moavia	engineering (mechanical)	Punjab, Pakistan
Rehan Majid	engineering (mechanical/aerospace)	Sindh, Pakistan
Rizwan Hussain	science (chemistry)	Punjab, Pakistan
Abdul Qayyum	engineering (mechanical)	Punjab, Pakistan
Muhammad Ilyas	engineering (mining)	Punjab, Pakistan
Arshad Saleem Bhatti	science (physics, nano-science & nanotechnology)	Punjab, Pakistan
Ayub Sabir	education	KPK, Pakistan
Kamran Vasfy	academic distinction (medicine/destist)	
Asrar Ahmad (Ibne Safi) (late)	literature	Sindh, Pakistan
Taqi Usmani	public service	Sindh, Pakistan
Allam Razi Jafar Haqvi	public service	Sindh, Pakistan
Muhammad Javed Afridi	public service	KPK, Pakistan
Ahmedullah	public service (highest tax payer)	
Rehan Hassan	public service (highest tax payer)	
Justice (R) Nasira Iqbal	public service	

=== 2020 ===
Brig Ashfaq Hassan ⭐️, SI (M)	Pakistan Army (Military)	Punjab, Pakistan
Brig (R) Tahir Ali Syed ⭐️	Pakistan Army (M)	Punjab, Pakistan
Abdul Hamid	science (physics)	Punjab, Pakistan
Raja Shahid Nazir	engineering (mechanical)	Punjab, Pakistan
Abdul Majeed Tilokar	engineering (metallurgy)	Punjab, Pakistan
Sajid Baloch	engineering (electronics)	Punjab, Pakistan
Naeem Ullah Dar	engineering (mechanical)	Punjab, Pakistan
Haider Ali Bhatty	engineering (aerospace)	Punjab, Pakistan
Muhammad Saleem	engineering (chemical)	Punjab, Pakistan
Amin Bahadur	engineering (mechanical)	KPK, Pakistan
Faizan Mansoor	engineering (nuclear safety regulation)	(Islamabad)
Muhammad Aniq	engineering (civil)	Sindh, Pakistan
Nisar Ahmed Siddiqui (late)	education	Sindh, Pakistan
Farhan Saif	education	Punjab, Pakistan
Ms. Bushra Ansari	arts (acting)	Sindh, Pakistan
Talat Hussain	arts (acting)	Sindh, Pakistan
Muhammad Imran Qureshi	arts (miniature/painting) (Punjab)	
Ms. Sultana Siddiqui	arts (drama writer/director/producer)	Sindh, Pakistan
Syed Farooq Qaiser	arts (puppeteer/writer)	Punjab, Pakistan
Naeem Altaf Bukhari	arts (anchorperson)	Punjab, Pakistan
Abdul Qadir (Late)	sports (cricket)	Punjab, Pakistan
Sr. Ruth Lewis (Late)	public service	
Brig. Rana Arfan Shakeel Ramay	public service	Punjab, Pakistan
Col. Sarwar Sultana	public service	Punjab, Pakistan
Khalid Mahmood	public service	Sindh, Pakistan
Ms. Sabina Khatri	public service	Sindh, Pakistan
Ahmed Irfan Aslam	public service	
Adnan Asdar Ali	philanthropy	Sindh, Pakistan
Pir Syed Lakht e Hassanain	philanthropy	Punjab, Pakistan

=== 2021 ===
Muhammad Masood ul Hassan	science (physics)	Punjab, Pakistan
Syed Hussain Abidi	science (industrial biotechnology)	Punjab, Pakistan
Aslam Umer	engineering (mechanical)	Sindh, Pakistan
Tariq Hameed	engineering (nuclear)	Punjab, Pakistan
Muhammad Shahzad	control design system	Punjab, Pakistan
Syed Waqar Azim	engineering (mechanical)	Punjab, Pakistan
Naveed ur Rehman	avionics & aerospace	Punjab, Pakistan
Muhammad Iqbal system engineering	Punjab, Pakistan	
Arshad Nawaz Khan	engineering (chemical)	Punjab, Pakistan
Ms. Abida Riaz Shahid Alias Nelo (late)	art (acting)	Punjab, Pakistan
Rashid Ali Rana	fine arts	Punjab, Pakistan
Shahid Abdullah	architect	Sindh, Pakistan
Syed Akeel Bilgrami	architect	Sindh, Pakistan
Salman Iqbal	sport (services to cricket)	
Maj. Gen. Arshad Naseem	public service	Punjab, Pakistan
Ms. Roshan Khursheed Bharucha	social work	
Mehmood ul Haq Alvi (late)	philanthropist	

=== 2022 ===
- Bhawani Shankar Chowdhry

=== 2023 ===
- Raza Saqib Mustafai
- Babar Azam Pakistani cricketer
- Col(R) Muhammad Khurram Kiyani
- Brig (R) Nasir Khan Jadoon
- Professor Mahfooz-ur-Rahman - for his lifelong service as a legendary educator, shaping countless leaders of Pakistan.

=== 2025 ===
- Ambreen Jan (Federal Secretary Information and Broadcasting)
- Asif Bashir Pakistani rescue hero
- Muhammad Afzal Tahir (military)
- Imtiaz Hussain (highest tax payer 2025)
- Colonel Muhammad Sajjad Anwar Bajwa
- Zia Ul Haq
- Abid Lashari
- Salma Awan in recognition of her literary services.
- Syed Farman Hussain (POP), (SI), Member Materials PAEC
