= Christian Voice (Karachi) =

Pakistani Newspaper

The Christian Voice
- Type: Weekly newspaper
- Owner: Roman Catholic Archdiocese of Karachi
- Founder: Fr. D'Arcy D'Souza
- Editor: Denzil D'Souza
- Founded: 1950
- Language: English
- Headquarters: Karachi
- City: Karachi
- Country: Pakistan
- Sister newspapers: Agahi

The Christian Voice, Karachi is an English-language weekly newspaper of the Roman Catholic Archdiocese of Karachi, Pakistan.

== History ==
It was founded in 1950 by Fr. D'Arcy D'Souza. This is the second oldest Catholic publication in Pakistan after the Catholic Naqib, an Urdu-language journal, founded in Lahore in 1929 and published by the Roman Catholic Archdiocese of Lahore. The Christian Voice is printed at the Rotti Press in Karachi.

In 1959 under the editorship of Fr. Francis Kotwani OFM, The Christian Voice became a weekly.

In 1970, Fr. Terence D'Souza was appointed editor of The Christian Voice.

In 1993 the editor was Fr. Augustine Varkey, who was also vice-principal of Saint Patrick's High School, Karachi.

In 2005, the editor was Robin Fernandez, founder of a Karachi-based human rights group Conscience, secretary for the press watchdog group Journalists for Human Rights and Democracy and on the editorial staff of Dawn, Pakistan's premier English-language newspaper.

Choosing to remain low-tech and not have a website, The Christian Voice plays a valuable role in disseminating information among the Christian population of Pakistan including the lives and deaths of prominent people and major events around the world.

In 2006, the archdiocese launched a new weekly Urdu-language paper, Agahi, which is in the style and format of The Christian Voice.

The Christian Voice has a modest overseas subscription.

In 2018 the editor is Mr. Denzil D'Souza.
