= Alverna, Netherlands =

Alverna
- Village
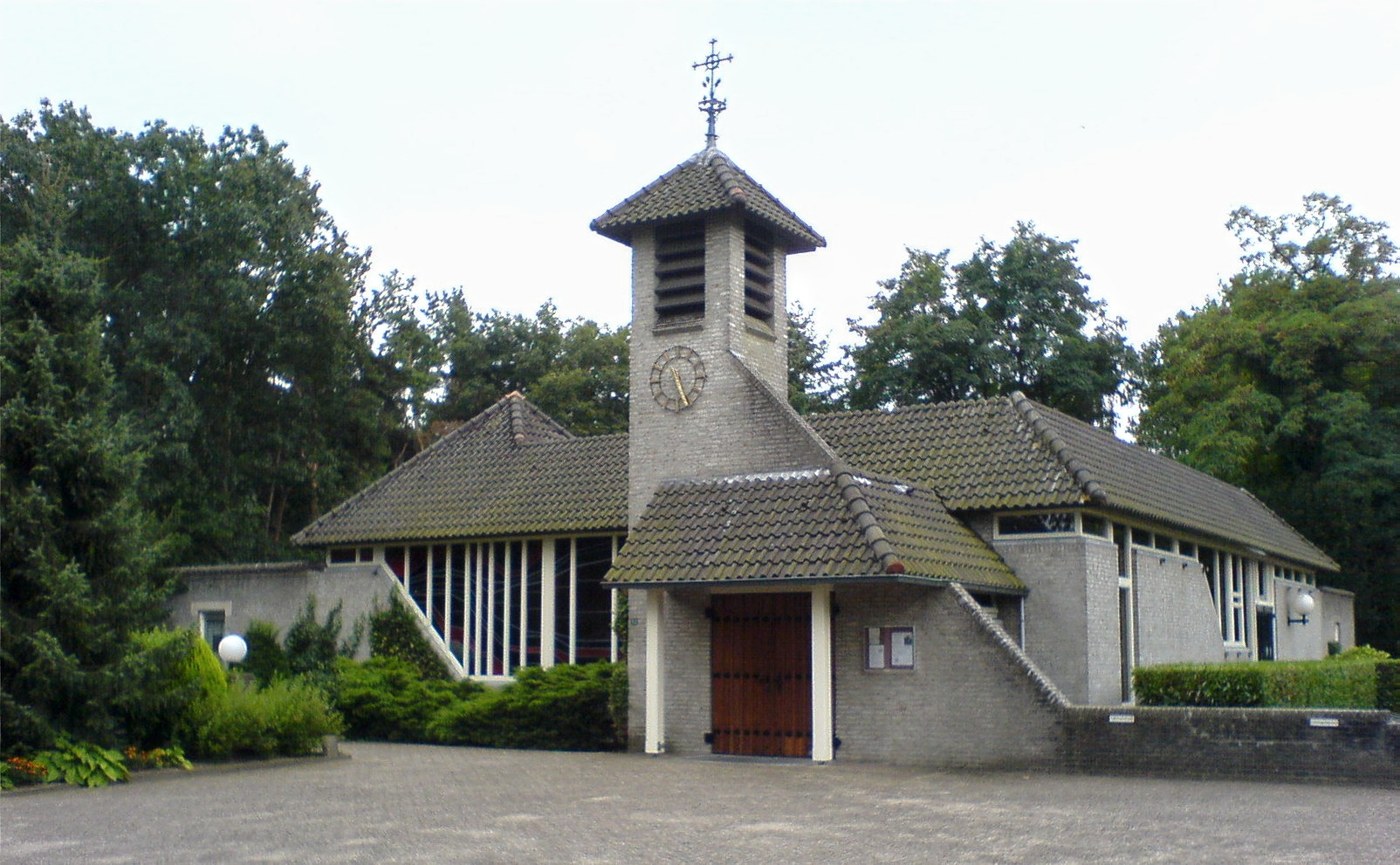
- Joseph's Church

- Location in the province of Gelderland in the Netherlands Alverna (Netherlands)
- Coordinates: 51°48′N 5°46′E
- Country: Netherlands
- Province: Gelderland
- Municipality: Wijchen

Area
  - Total: 10.61 km^{2} (4.10 sq mi)
- Elevation: 9.1 m (30 ft)

Population (2021)
  - Total: 2,525
  - Density: 238.0/km^{2} (616.4/sq mi)
- Time zone: UTC+1 (CET)
  - Summer (DST): UTC+2 (CEST)
- Postcode: 6603
- Area code: 024

Alverna (Dutch pronunciation: [ɑlˈvɛr.naː]) is a village in the municipality of Wijchen in the province of Gelderland in the Netherlands. As of 2021, it had a population of 2,525. The village is named after the Alverna monastery founded there in 1887, which in turn is named after La Verna, the mountain in Tuscany where Francis of Assisi is said to have received the stigmata on 17 September 1224.

== Description ==
The Franciscan monastery in the village was built between 1886 and 1889 on the provincial road between Nijmegen and Grave near Wijchen. A hamlet gradually developed around this monastery with its own parish, its own football club, and even its own postmark and representation in the Wijchen municipal council. By 1962 the village had a population of approximately 3,000. On 4 September 1980 the last 30 Franciscans moved to the monastic retirement home La Verna, built in the monastery garden on the Leemweg, which was officially opened on 17 October that year in the presence of the mayor of Wijchen, A.J.J.M. Arends. All that remains of the monastery is the neo-Gothic crossing tower of the monastery church, which was built in the garden of La Verna. The choir stalls of this church are now located in Maastricht.

In the village, there is also a monastery called Portiuncula that serves as the motherhouse of the Franciscan Sisters of Bennebroek, an educational congregation that always had the nursery school, the primary girls' school and the secondary school under their care until the 1980s. The complex has now been renovated twice and now also serves as a care center for older members of the congregation and other congregations as well as for lay people. The village has a mill from 1887, the authentic driving gear of which is still completely intact. The name of the mill, Schoonoord, probably has to do with the original religious character of the village. The mill was completely restored to its original state in 2006. Not only have the original colors returned but the streamlined Van Bussel wing system has also been installed. Unfortunately, there are now so many trees around the mill that no wind can be caught over the west side. The mill's grinding mechanism will also be restored, so that 'Alvernese flour' can be milled again after more than 60 years of inactivity. There is also an artificial ski slope, a riding school, a bowling center, and a golf course around the village.

Alvernese speak of living "on" Alverna instead of "in" Alverna. This probably has to do with the fact that the center of the village - along the national road - is slightly higher than the farmlands and the hamlet of Lunen to the south. During the flood of 1926, when the Meuse, which was not yet canalized at the time, flooded again, the water also reached the southern part of the buildings of the village center. In memory of this flood, a memorial monument was unveiled by the late Queen Wilhelmina, which is located approximately on the southern boundary of the linear settlement.

== Gallery ==
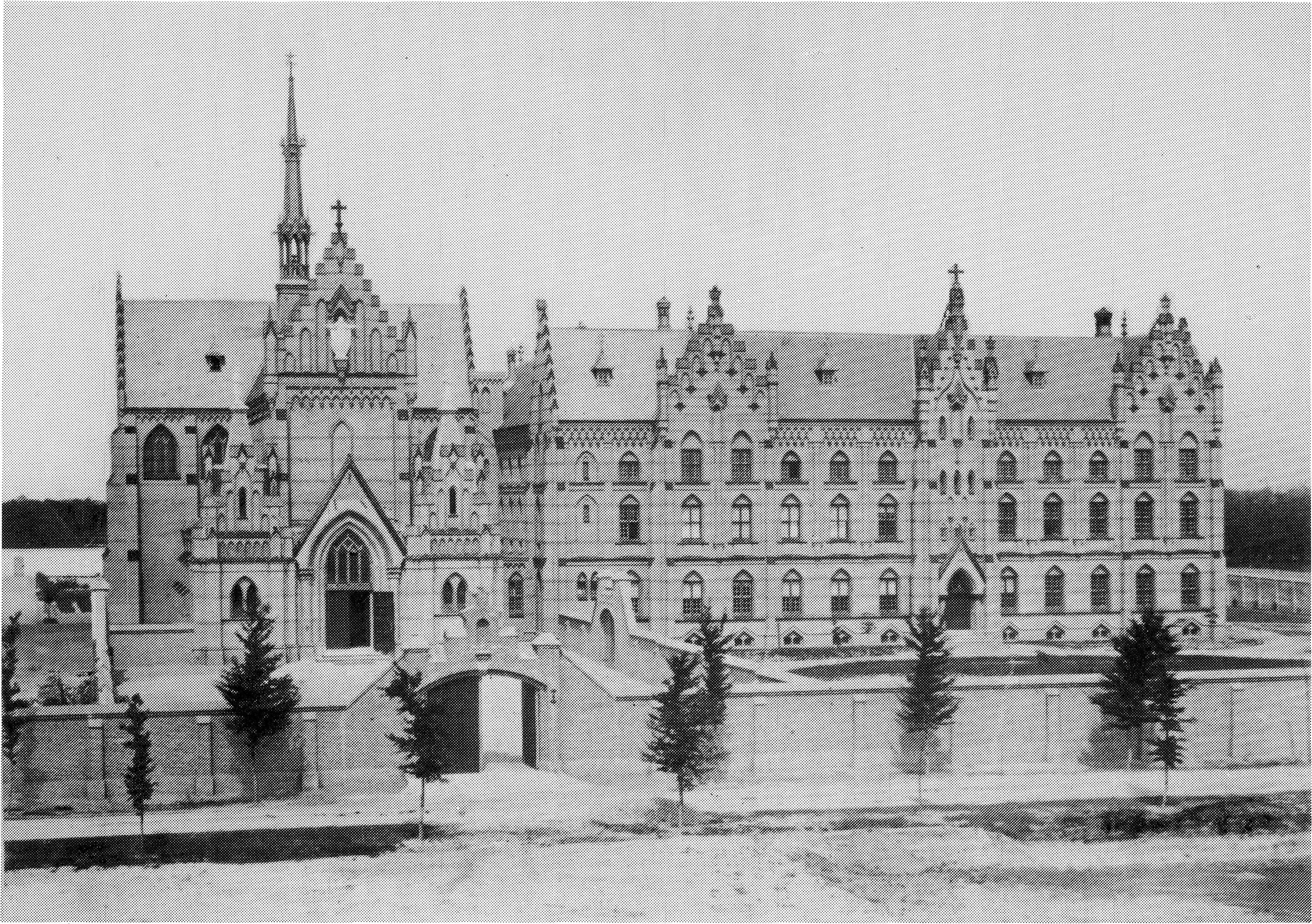
Former Franciscan monastery

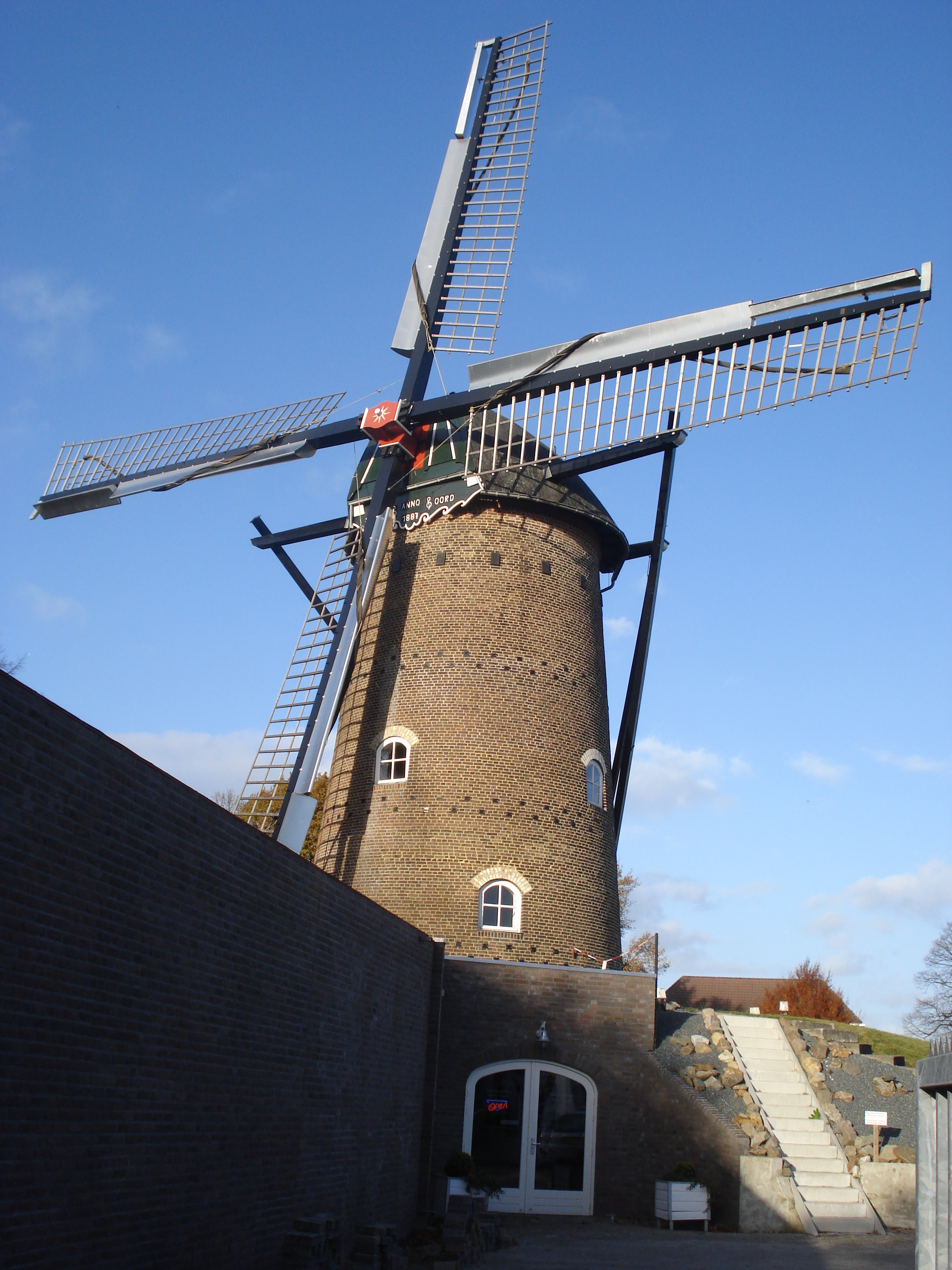
Windmill Schoonoord

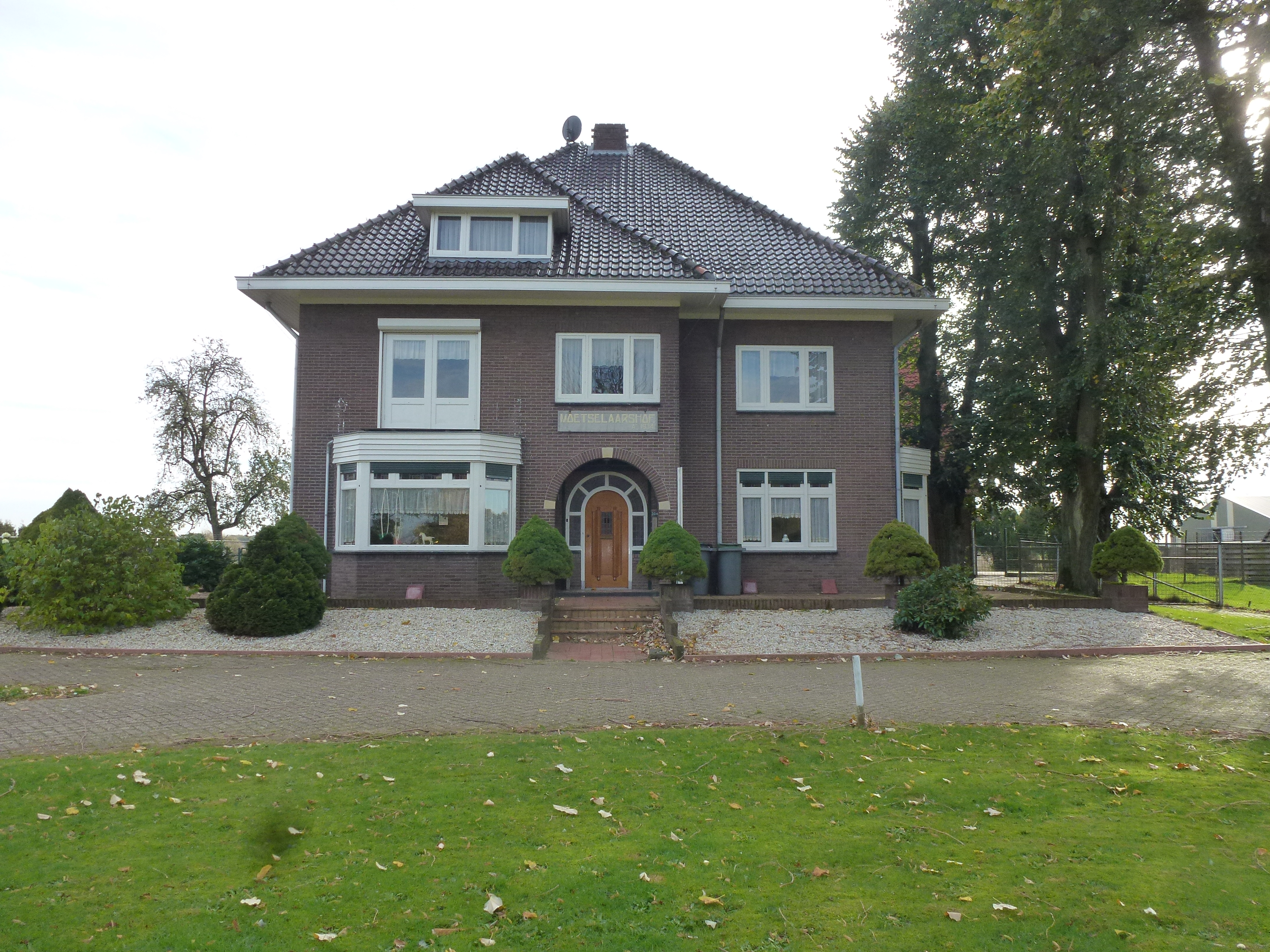
Farmhouse in Alverna

== Notable people ==
- Fred Rutten (born 1962), football manager
