= Bridget Sequeira =

Pakistani-Indian Franciscan religious sister

Bridget Bibiana Sequeira
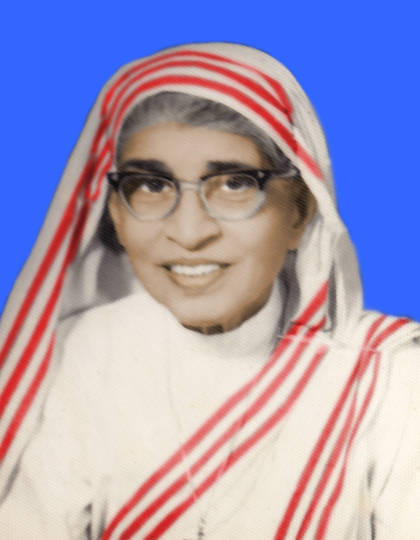
- Born: 12 December 1905; Bushehr
- Died: 1 July 1987 (aged 81); Christ the King Convent, Karachi, Pakistan.
- Other names: "Biddy", "Mother B"
- Citizenship: Pakistani
- Occupations: Religious sister, teacher
- Years active: Superior General of the Congregation till 1956
- Known for: Founder of the Franciscan Missionaries of Christ the King
- Board member of: Karachi Municipal Council

Bridget Sequeira, FMCK, was a Pakistani-Indian religious sister who founded the Franciscan Missionaries of Christ the King, a missionary religious congregation for women, in Karachi, Pakistan, then India. It is currently headquartered in Goa, India.

== Early life ==
Sequeira was born in Bushehr, Persia, on 12 December 1905. Her parents were Joao Felipe Sequeira and Matilda de Melo from the Sonarbhatt section of Saligao, in the District of North Goa, then part of Portuguese India, now part of the Republic of India.

In 1913 she was sent to Karachi, then still part of the British Raj, where she studied at St Joseph's Convent School and passed the Senior Cambridge examination in 1921. She then joined the staff of St Joseph’s School. She later passed the Secondary Teachers' Certificate Examination and went on to a teaching job at St Joseph's Convent School in the same city.

== Religious life ==
In 1937 she founded the Congregation of the Franciscan Missionaries of Christ the King in Karachi, at JM3/574 Catholic Colony No. 2. This house was given to Mother Bridget by Anthony Venantius, in order to start the FMCK. They started growing and a convent was built in the same area, and they belong to St. Philomena's church, later named Christ The King. The congregation has grown and spread through various parts of India, Pakistan and Sharjah. In 1939 Sequeira was also elected as a member of the Municipal Council by the people of Karachi.

In 1946 Sequeira sailed to her ancestral city of Saligao, accompanied by three sisters of the congregation, landing in Goa on 13 May. They arrived at the house in Cotula where her aunt, Etelvina de Melo, operated St. Mary's Girls School, which had been founded in 1900 by Joshino Sequeira as the first English school for girls in Goa. Mother Bridget then took control of the school from her aunt. With this the Franciscan Missionaries became established in India.

Later the sisters would build their own modern structure on a hill in Donvaddo in Saligao, called the Lourdes Convent High School. It was built in three stages and finally completed in 1968.

After stepping down from the office of Superior General, Mother Bridget came to St. Elizabeth's Convent in Pomburpa, Goa where she joined the rank and file and moved quietly into the life of the sisters in Pomburpa. The people there were keen on meeting her. She personally visited people who were ill or lonely and brought them comfort. Food was given generously to all in need. On 1 July 1987 Mother Bridget died in Christ the King Convent – Mother House in a sector of Metropolitan Karachi.

== Legacy ==
The congregation has constructed schools, orphanages, and hospitals, as well as homes for the aged and disabled. During their 10th General Chapter held in 2005, the sisters decided to move the motherhouse from Karachi to Old Goa and to divide the administration of the congregation into two provinces: the province of Saint Francis of Assisi in Pakistan and Saint Clare's Province in India, as well as three regions, which are expected to develop into full provinces.

In 2010 there were 61 sisters in Pakistan, still working in their various institutions and ministries under the congregation.
