= Catholic Colony =

Catholic Colony is a neighborhood in Jamshed Town in Karachi, Sindh, Pakistan. Initially a Christian neighborhood, it was constructed as two projects known as Catholic Colony No. 1 and Catholic Colony No. 2.

The Catholic Colony 1 and 2 were new developments in the early 1900s and considered to be on the outskirts of the city. After the partition of India in 1947, the rapid expansion of the city put the Catholic Colonies in the heart of Karachi.

Catholic Colony No. 1 is located opposite the Quaid's Mazar on M. A. Jinnah Road. Catholic Colony No. 2, is situated on Wedder Burn Road and Dadabhai Naoroji Road.

Catholic Colony No. 1 falls within St. Lawrence’s Parish while Catholic Colony No. 2 is within the boundaries of Christ the King Parish.

This Catholic Colonies were built and supervised by Anthony Venantius.

The mother house of the Franciscan Missionaries of Christ the King is located in Catholic Colony No.2.

Parts of the colonies are in a poor state with water shortages on the one hand and subsidence on the other.
