= Pakistan Society of Neuro-Oncology =

Pakistan's first scientific society

The Pakistan Society of Neuro-Oncology (PASNO) is Pakistan's first scientific society dedicated to neuro-oncology. It was established to unite experts from within and outside Pakistan to enhance the care of patients with brain and spinal cord tumors of the brain and spinal cord, and to provide a platform for research, teaching, and training activities related to neuro-oncology in Pakistan. PASNO is chartered by the Government of Pakistan and operates as a non-profit society.

The society's first symposium was attended by over 50 speakers from 13 countries.
