= Presentation High School (disambiguation) =

Presentation High School may refer to:

- Presentation Academy, Louisville, Kentucky, United States
- Presentation High School, San Jose, California, United States
- Presentation of Mary Academy, Methuen, Massachusetts, United States

Internationally

- Presentation Convent High School, Srinagar, Jammu and Kashmir, India
- Presentation National High School, Benin City, Nigeria
- Presentation Convent Girls High School, Rawalpindi, Pakistan
- Presentation Convent High School, Murree, Pakistan
- Presentation Convent School, Peshawar, Pakistan
- Presentation Convent School, Jhelum, Pakistan
- Presentation Convent High School, Sargodha, Pakistan

== See also ==
- Presentation College (disambiguation)
- Presentation (disambiguation)
