= St Mary's Cambridge Higher Secondary School =

St Mary’s Cambridge Higher Secondary School
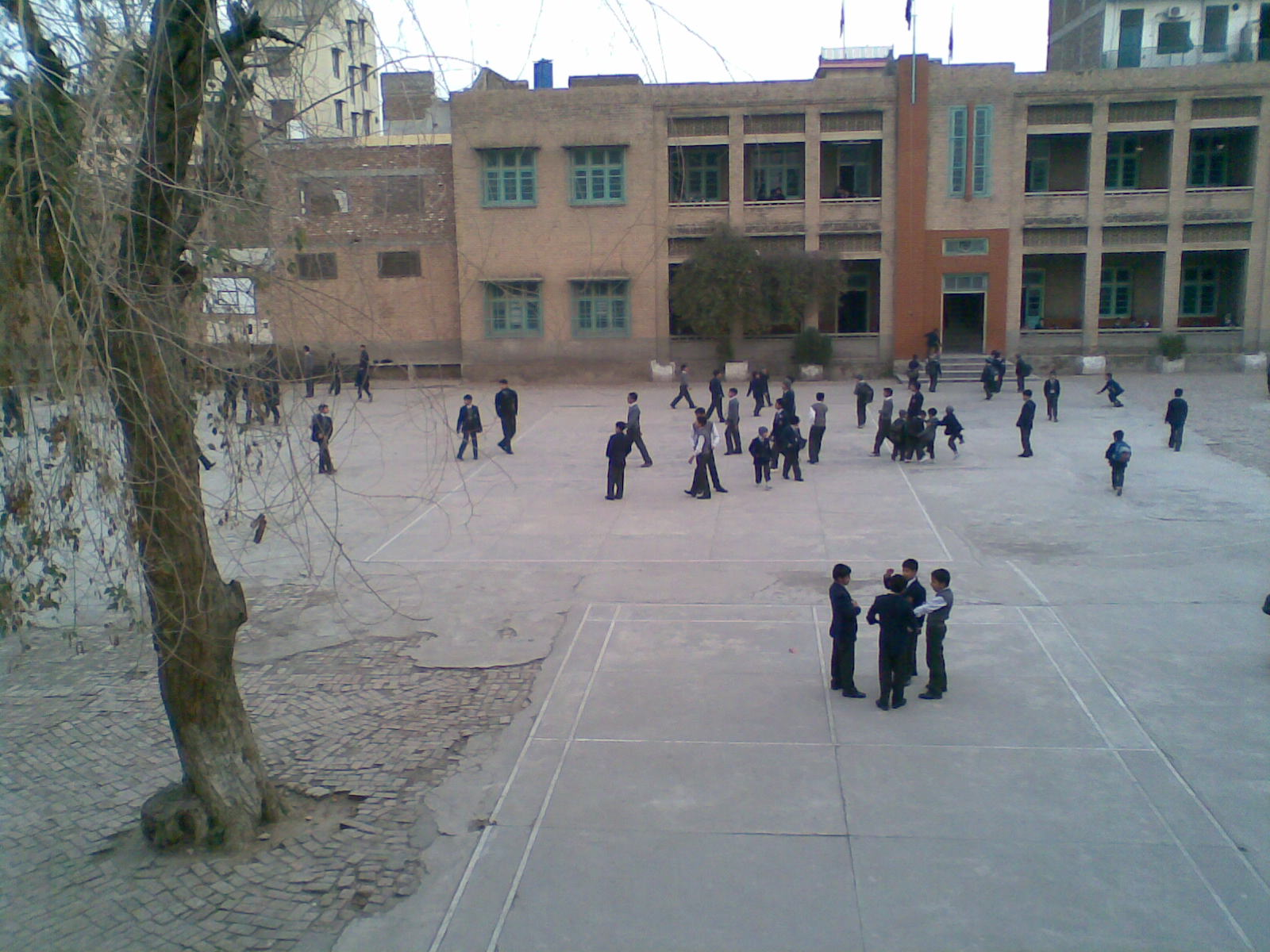
- School grounds and junior section

Location
- Murree Road, Rawalpindi, Punjab; Pakistan
- Coordinates: 33°36′33″N 73°3′57″E

Information
- Other name: Saint Mary's Cambridge Higher Secondary School
- Former name: St Mary's Cambridge High School
- Type: Private primary and secondary school
- Religious affiliation: Catholicism
- Established: 1949; 77 years ago
- Founder: Fr. Thysen MHM
- Oversight: Catholic Board of Education; Roman Catholic Diocese of Islamabad-Rawalpindi
- Grades: PreK-12
- Gender: Boys
- Website: www.smcsedu.com

St Mary's Cambridge Higher Secondary School, formerly St Mary's Cambridge High School, is a private Catholic primary and secondary school for boys, located on Murree Road in Rawalpindi, Pakistan.

== History ==
St Mary's Cambridge Higher Secondary School is one of the oldest independent schools of Rawalpindi. It is housed in an old building which was previously used as hospital, named Holy Family Hospital. The hospital moved to its present building in Satellite Town during the early 1950s and the building was handed over to the school. The school is owned and managed by the Roman Catholic Diocese of Islamabad-Rawalpindi. It provides religious education in Islam as per the curriculum decided by the local education board. Current Principal is Mr. Asif Nawab Gill who has served the school both as a teacher and principal earlier as well.

== Location and facilities ==
St Mary's Cambridge Higher Secondary School is located on Murree Road between Liaqat Bagh and Committee Chowk. It is easily accessible from anywhere in the city and from Islamabad.

== Houses ==
The names of the houses are: Byrne (yellow), Iqbal (green), Jinnah (blue), Liaquat (red).

== Events ==
On May 10, 2008, the school was the venue for a Run for Unity program. It involved students aged 11–15 in drawing, essay-writing, poetry, song, PowerPoint and video-making competitions. Archbishop Adolfo Tito Yllana, the apostolic nuncio to Pakistan, and Bishop Anthony Lobo attended.

== Notable alumni ==
- Rana Mubashir, Pakistani Journalist/Writer/Talk Show Host/Political Analyst
- Jamshed Burki, Pakistani military officer and civil servant
- Javed Burki, Pakistani cricketer and politician
- Asif Nawaz Janjua, 4th Chief of Army Staff (Pakistan Army)
- Gohar Ayub Khan, Pakistani politician and son of Field Marshal Ayub Khan
- Akhtar Ayub Khan, son of Field Marshal Ayub Khan
- Rashid Minhas, pilot in the Pakistan Air Force
