= List of educational institutions in Faisalabad =

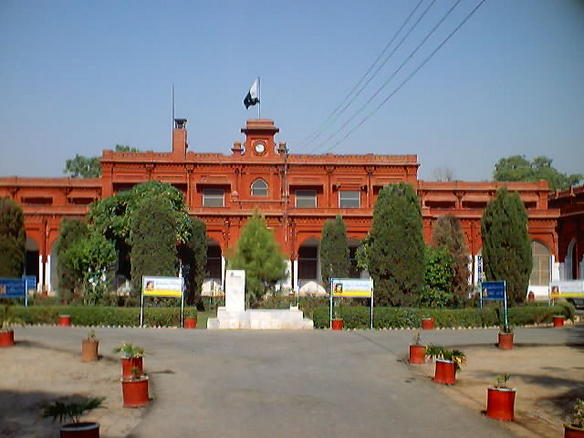
Government College University, Faisalabad

This is a list of educational institutions in the district of Faisalabad in the Pakistani province of Punjab.

== Professional training institutes ==
- BirdView Logic Academy (Software House and IT Training), Faisalabad

== First category institutes ==
- Students' Inn College
- The Punjab School Faisalabad
- Iqra International Institute Faisalabad
- The Skylark Academy system Faisalabad (campus)
- STEM Visions Faisalabad
- Leads School System Faisalabad
- Angels International College
- Chiniot Islamia School
- Beaconhouse School System
- Govt. Comprehensive Higher Secondary School Samanabad Faisalabad
- Govt. M.C. High School Samanabad Faisalabad
- Punjab Medical College
- Aziz Fatimah Medical and Dental College
- Divisional Public School & College
- Punjab Group of Colleges
- White Rose School System
- Divisional Model College
- Government College University
- University of Agriculture
- Institute of Engineering & Fertilizer Research
- Global Science Academy Faisalabad
- Roots IVY School & College
- Government M. C. High School, Ghulam Muhammad Abad, Faisalabad
- The City School, East Canal Road Faisalabad
- Punjab College of Science, Faisalabad

== Higher education ==
- NFC Institute of Engineering and Fertilizer Research (NFC-IEFR)
- National University of Modern Languages (NUML)
- University of Sargodha, Lyallpur Campus, Faisalabad
- University of Engineering and Technology, Lahore: Faisalabad campus
- Riphah International University Faisalabad
- University of Agriculture, Faisalabad
- Punjab Medical College / Faisalabad Medical University
- Aziz Fatimah Medical and Dental College
- Government College University, Faisalabad
- Government College Women University (Faisalabad)
- National Textile University
- University of Faisalabad
- Independent Medical College, Faisalabad
- SKANS School of Accountancy
- Punjab Law College
- Allama Iqbal Open University
- Hamdard University, Faisalabad
- Preston University
- University of Education
- Virtual UniversityFAST-NU
- Institute of Cost and Management Accountants of Pakistan (ICMAP)
- Institute of Chartered Accountants of Pakistan (ICAP)
- Pakistan Institute of Public Finance Accountants (PIPFA)
- College of Physicians and Surgeons of Pakistan (CPSP)
- University of Central Punjab
- National University of Computer & Emerging Sciences Chiniot – Faisalabad Campus (FAST NU – NUCES)
- University Community College, GCUF
- Govt. College of Commerce, Abdullah Pur, Faisalabad
- TMUC (The Millennium Universal College Faisalabad)
- University of Central Punjab, Faisalabad Campus

== Colleges ==
- Army Public Schools & Colleges System
- Government Degree College for Women Samanabad, Faisalabad
- Government Postgraduate College Samanabad Faisalabad
- Faisalabad College for Women Samanabad Faisalabad (Westfield Campus)
- Cadet College Faisalabad
- Divisional Public School & College
- Government College of Technology Samanabad Faisalabad
- Government Post Graduate College of Commerce, Peoples Colony Faisalabad
- Government Post Graduate Islamia College Faisalabad
- Government Postgraduate College of Science Samanabad Faisalabad
- Govt. Municipal Graduate College Jaranwala Road, Abdullahpur, Faisalabad
- KIPS College
- Oxley College of Science
- Punjab College of Science
- SAHA Group of Colleges
- Shiblee Group of Colleges
- Students' Inn College
- Summit Group of colleges
- Superior College
- Tips college
- Chenab Group of Colleges
- Dar-ul-Madinah College, near Zainab Masjid Muhammadia Colony, Susan Road, Madinah Town, Faisalabad

== Schools ==
- Army Public Schools & Colleges System
- Chenab Group of Schools & Colleges, Gulshan-e-Hayyat, Fsd
- Ace School System, Lasani Town, Faisalabad
- Shiblee Grammar School System
- Al-Bahadur Public High School, 229-RB, Makuana, Faisalabad
- Allied Schools System Sarghodha Road campus
- Beaconhouse School System, Gulshan-e-Iqbal
- Brilliant School System, Bhatta stop Jhang Road, Faisalabad
- Usama Bin Zaid Public High School
- Chiniot Islamia School
- Convent of Jesus and Mary
- Dar-e-Arqam Schools
- Divisional Public School Faisalabad
- EFA School System Ideal Campus
- Faisalabad Cadet Schools
- Government Comprehensive Boys High School, Samanabad
- Government High School for Boys, Salarwala
- Govt. M.C. High School Samanabad Faisalabad
- The Grace School System
- Happy Home School System
- Imtiaz Grammar Girls Secondary School, Faisalabad
- Iqra International Institute Faisalabad, Doctors City
- Kamil Foundation Secondary School, Jinnah Colony, Faisalabad
- Lahore Grammar School
- La Salle High School Faisalabad
- LEADS School System Faisalabad
- Lee Rosary School, Al-Fayyaz Colony, Satiana Road, Faisalabad
- Millat Grammar School
- Punjab Science School, Kaleem Shaheed Colony # 1, Faisalabad
- The Right Way School System Liaqatabad No.1 Faisalabad
- Sandal College, Faisalabad
- St. Joseph's Technical Institute, Faisalabad
- St. Peter's High School
- The Spirit School (chain)
- Tahir Model High School & college
- White Rose School System, Faisalabad
- The Classic School, Faisalabad

== Special needs ==
According to the Government of Punjab website.

- Tanzeem Al Lisan Eid Bagh, Dhobi Ghat, Faisalabad
- Al Faisal Markaz Nabina Civil Line Faisalabad
- Pakistan Association of the Blind Faisalabad
- Mentally Retarded Children Millat Town Faisalabad
- Government Girls Higher Secondary School for (H.I) 24-A Peoples Colony Faisalabad
- Government Institute for the Blind W-Block Madina Town Faisalabad
- Government Special Education Center for Mentally Retarded Children, P-863, B-Block Amin Town Canal Road Faisalabad
- Government Institute for Slow Learners, 153-B Peoples Colony Muslim Park Faisalabad
- Government Special Education Center Iqbal Town, House No. 5 Ghulam Rasool Nagar Near Fawara Chowk Faisalabad
- Government Special Education Center Lyall Pur Town, P-82 Muslim Town B Block, Sargodha Road Faisalabad
- Government Special Education Center Jinnah Town, 440-A Ghulam Muhammad Abad Faisalabad
- National Special Education Center Millat Town Faisalabad
- Government Boys Higher Secondary School for (H.I), Jaranwala Road Faisalabad
- Government Special Education Center Adjacent Stadium Jaranwala
- Government Special Education Center Near Government Elementary School No. 5, Canal Road Tandlianwala
- Government Special Education Center, 471-More Ashraf Abad Sammundri
- Government Special Education Center 17-A Mohallah Aslam Abad, Khurrianwala Road, Chak Jhumra
- Eilya Care Home 24-Y-J, Madina Town, Faisalabad
- Al Muslim Girls High School Chak No. 202/RB Bhaiwala, Faisalabad
