= St. Joseph's Convent School, Quetta =

Location
- Shara e Zarghoon; Quetta, Balochistan; Pakistan
- Coordinates: 30°12′05.4″N 67°00′30.7″E

Information
- Type: High school
- Religious affiliation: Catholic
- Administration: Catholic Board of Education
- Principal: Naseem Niamat (2015)
- Gender: Girls
- Affiliations: Catholic Apostolic Prefecture of Quetta

St. Joseph's Convent School is a Pakistani Christian school for girls located in Quetta, Balochistan. It is located on Zarghoon Road, 200 meters away from the St. Francis' Grammar School.

== History ==
The school is registered with the British Council in Pakistan, and it offers O Level, AS Level, and A Level courses.

The principal in 2013 was Angelina Ibrahim. Naseem Naimat became principal in 2015.

The school organized an inter-school, national song and debate competition on the eve of the 57th Independence Day of Pakistan in 2004. Parween Magsi, Provincial Minister for Social Welfare Department, Government of Balochistan was the chief guest. She promised her full co-operation and assistance for construction work already started in the school, and announced a cash donation of rupees five hundred thousand.

In 2008, Chief Minister of Balochistan Jam Mohammad Yousaf declared the school to be the second-best education institution in Balochistan and awarded it a Best Performance Award. The caliber of the school is also supported by the results of the Secondary School Certificate Examination 2002 in which several students obtained top positions.

=== Uniform ===
The school uniform for juniors includes a white shirt and shalwar, a navy blue tunic with a red tie and belt. For the middle and senior sections, it consists of a white sash, white socks and black shoes.

=== Alumni ===
- Major General Shahida Malik – Inspector-General of Hospitals
- Parween Magsi – Provincial Minister for Social Welfare Department
- Zeba Bakhtiar – Film actress.

== See also ==
- Christianity in Pakistan
- Education in Pakistan
