= Cathedral of Sts. Peter and Paul, Faisalabad =

Roman Catholic cathedral in Pakistan

Coordinates: 31.416°N 73.087°E

Cathedral of Sts. Peter and Paul

Religion
- Affiliation: Roman Catholic
- Diocese: Diocese of Faisalabad
- Leadership: Bishop Joseph Indrias Rehmat
- Year consecrated: 1969

Location
- Location: Faisalabad, Pakistan
- Interactive map of Cathedral of Sts. Peter and Paul

Architecture
- Groundbreaking: 1965
- Completed: 1969

Website
- Diocese of Faisalabad

The Cathedral of Sts. Peter and Paul is the main church of the Roman Catholic Diocese of Faisalabad, 250 kilometers south of Islamabad, Pakistan.

The cathedral has played a significant role in promoting harmony and understanding among the nation’s religious communities through events like the 2007 dinner Faisalabad’s Council for Inter-religious dialogue hosted for Muslim leaders and faithful.

== History ==
The foundation of the Cathedral was laid in 1965 and the building was consecrated in 1969.

In 2004 Maulana Abdul Khabir Azad, grand imam (prayer leader) of Badshahi Mosque in Lahore, was chief guest at a ceremony to plant the Peace Pole on the lawn in front of the Cathedral.

On the 100th anniversary of the celebration of the first Church Unity Octave both Catholic and Protestant leaders invited each other. The first of these gatherings was hosted by Bishop Joseph Coutts of Faisalabad, who invited Presbyterian Church leaders and laypeople to the Cathedral on 18 January 2008.

A special Mass was held at the Cathedral of Sts. Peter and Paul on 19 June 2009 to celebrate the Year for Priests. It was attended by about 20 diocesan priests.

On 26 September 2009, hundreds of people gathered in the Cathedral of Saints Peter and Paul to greet Bishop Rufin Anthony, a native of Faisalabad, who on 21 September 2009 took over as coadjutor bishop of the Roman Catholic Diocese of Islamabad-Rawalpindi.

On 17 April 2010 the Diocese organized a special ceremony to celebrate its Golden Jubilee. Archbishop Adolfo Tito Yllana, Apostolic Nuncio to Pakistan, Bishop Joseph Coutts (Faisalabad), Archbishop Lawrence Saldanha (Lahore), and Bishop Andrew Francis (Multan) spoke on the occasion. At the Jubilee Mass at the Cathedral attended by about 5,000 Catholics from 21 parishes, Archbishop Yllana said that the Vatican was happy to see the number of priestly and religious vocations in the diocese.
