= Catholic Public High School =

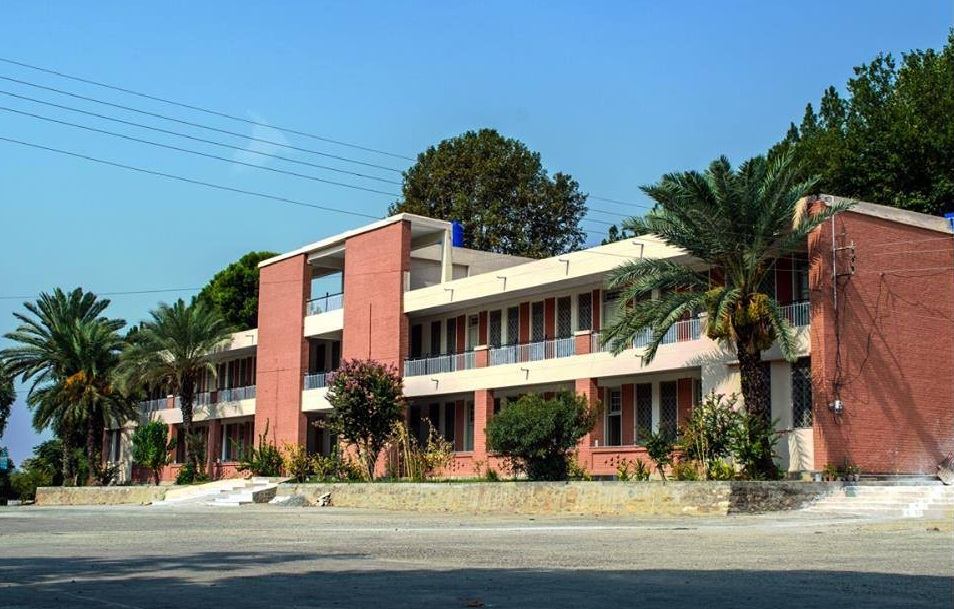
- New building of Sangota Public School
- Sangota, Khyber Pakhtunkhwa; Pakistan

Information
- Other name: Sangota Public School
- Type: Private primary and secondary school
- Religious affiliation: Catholicism
- Denomination: Sisters of the Presentation
- Opened: 1962 – 2007; April 2012 –
- Status: Open
- Closed: 2009 – April 2012
- Oversight: Diocese of Islamabad-Rawalpindi
- Principal: Sister Gretta Gill
- Gender: Girls
- Age range: 5-16
- Enrollment: 1,000; 800; (2007 & 2015)

Catholic Public High School, commonly known as Sangota Public School, is a private Catholic primary and secondary school for girls in Sangota, Khyber Pakhtunkhwa, Pakistan. It was established in 1962 under the direction of the Diocese of Islamabad-Rawalpindi and was renowned for being the center of quality education in the entire Malakand region. Most of the teachers were Irish Sisters of the Presentation who had devoted their lives to educating Swat's children.

A co-education system was in place until the 1990s but after the establishment of Excelsior College, the boys were shifted there and from then onwards only girls were admitted to the school. The school was forced to close between 2009 and 2012 due to threats of fundamentalist Islamic suicide attacks and damage from bombings.

== History ==
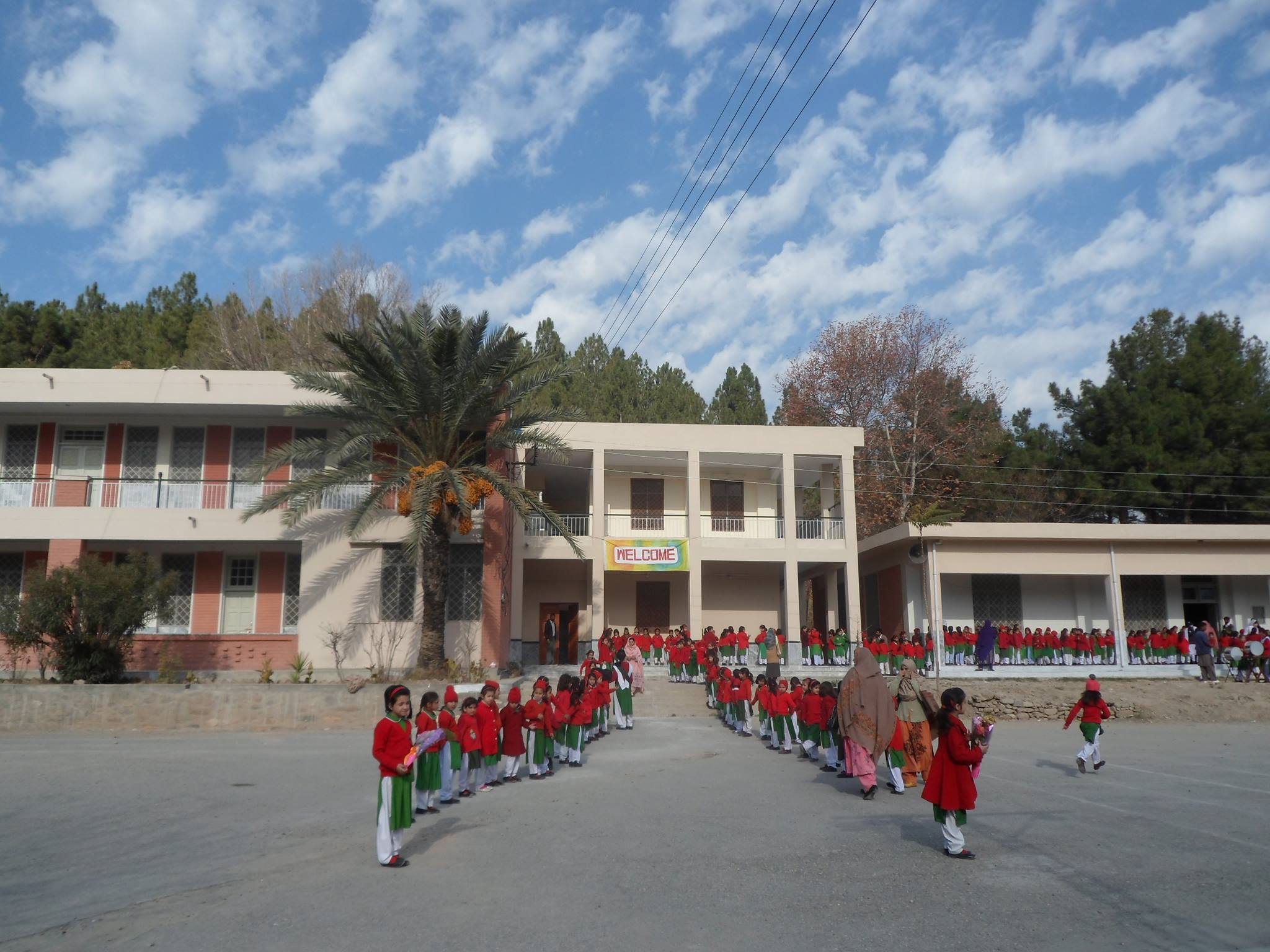
Sangotians marching

This convent school was established in 1965 by Miangul Abdul Haq Jahanzeb, popularly known as Wali sahib, the last ruler of Swat state, who not only donated land for the school but also provided generous financial aid for its construction and operations. The majestic building of the school was situated in a beautiful location on the left bank of the meandering Swat river, committed for spreading the light of education in the region. The Sister teachers of the school also dedicated their lives to education of young girls in neighboring villages and hamlets, without any thought of financial gains, teaching them the same courses as were being taught in the school in the morning.

=== Temporary closure ===
The school for girls was closed on September 10, 2007, after a letter warned the Sisters running the school to close the "factory of Christians" or face suicide attacks. Jan Nisaran-e-Islam (sacrificers of Islam) sent the letter to Swat Press Club, and local newspapers published it on September 9. It reopened on 17 September after the Swat district coordination officer assured protection for the convent and the school.

In June 2009 it was destroyed by raiders, according to a report from the Pakistani Bishops National Commission for Justice and Peace.

The girls' boarding school, run by the Sisters, was attacked with explosives that destroyed the building. No victims were reported, as the Sisters themselves had closed the school, as a precaution. The school had nearly 1,000 students mainly from poor Christian and Muslim families.

According to the Church, Khyber-Pakhtunkhwa has suffered attacks on nearly 150 schools in recent years, a sign of the rise in intolerance and the spread of Islamic fundamentalist groups that are trying to annihilate the work of Christian institutions in the area of education.

=== Re-opening ===
In April 2012 the school was reopened with three sisters and over 80 girls and an impressive new building was erected for its operations. In 2015, the school had 26 teachers and 10 other workers assisting four Pakistani nuns.

== Results ==
In 2017 Sehreen Rafiq of Sangota Public School stood first in the results of the Secondary School Certificate annual examination of the Board of Intermediate and Secondary Education, Swat.

== Prominent Alumni ==
Miangul Adnan Aurangzeb, engineer, member of Parliament and Wali of Swat.
