= Our Lady of Lourdes Minor Seminary =

Roman Catholic seminary in Pakistan

- Type: Preparatory seminary
- Established: 1995
- Founders: Bishop Anthony Lobo
- Religious affiliation: Roman Catholic Diocese of Islamabad-Rawalpindi
- Rector: Father William Rahat
- Students: 22 (2017)
- Location: Rawalpindi, Punjab, Pakistan
- Campus: 22 ha (54 acres)

Our Lady of Lourdes Minor Seminary is the preparatory seminary in the Roman Catholic Diocese of Islamabad-Rawalpindi. It is one of only five minor seminaries in Pakistan. In the 21st century the seminary has only one computer.

The seminary is located on 22 hectares of wooded, rolling hills in Rawalpindi. It was built on land donated to the Church in 1961 for educational purposes by Field Marshal Ayub Khan, President of Pakistan. A pastoral center has already been based in the same premises since October 1996. Initially, part of the 24-room pastoral center was used for the seminary, with 24 seminarians and the rector, Father J.J. Edwards of the Oblates of Mary Immaculate living on the premises. The seminary was started by Bishop Anthony Lobo in 1995 and Father J. J. Edward OMI was appointed the first rector. The first rector served the seminary only for two years. The first local rector of the seminary was Rev. Father Philip Joseph. He was assisted by Rev. Father Michael Sullivan.

The seminary had produced 14 priests from 1995 to 2020.

Father William Rahat was the assistant rector of the seminary in 2010. By 2018 he had become rector.

On 11 February 2020, the seminary celebrated the silver jubilee of its founding.

== Rectors ==
- Father J.J. Edwards OMI
- Father Philip Joseph
- Father Michael Sullivan SM
- Father Joseph Dogra
- Fr. Asif John Khokhar
- Father William Rahat
