= Diocese of Faisalabad =

Latin Catholic diocese in Pakistan

Coordinates: 31.3500°N 72.9833°E

Diocese of Faisalabad Dioecesis Faisalabadensis فیصل آباد میں کیتھولک چرچ

Location
- Country: Pakistan
- Ecclesiastical province: Lahore
- Metropolitan: Lahore

Statistics
- Area: 35,300 km^{2} (13,600 sq mi)
- Population: Total; Catholics: (as of 2006); 32,861,670; 189,000 (0.4%)

Information
- Denomination: Catholic Church
- Sui iuris church: Latin Church
- Rite: Roman Rite
- Cathedral: Cathedral of Sts. Peter and Paul

Current leadership
- Pope: Leo XIV
- Bishop: Joseph Indrias Rehmat
- Metropolitan Archbishop: Sebastian Francis Shaw

Website
- Diocese of Faisalabad

The Diocese of Faisalabad (Lat: Dioecesis Faisalabadensis) is a diocese of the Latin Church of the Catholic Church in Pakistan.

== History ==
Erected in 1960, as the Diocese of Lyallpur, the diocese was created from the Diocese of Multan. The new diocese comprised the civil districts of Faisalabad (formerly Lyallpur), Sahiwal and Jhang.

In 1977, the name of the diocese was changed to the Diocese of Faisalabad. The diocese is a suffragan of the Archdiocese of Lahore. The Diocese of Faisalabad now comprises the following civil boundaries: the whole of the Faisalabad Division with the districts of Faisalahad, Jhang, Toba Tek Singh and Chiniot. In the Multan Division, the districts of Sahiwal, Pakpattan and Okara. The Diocese of Faisalabad covers a 35,300 km2 area and is home to about 189,000 Catholics in 28 parishes.

The Cathedral of Sts. Peter and Paul is the main church of the diocese.

The Focolare Movement was introduced into Pakistan in 1968 via the Faisalabad diocese by Father Juliano Ricchiardi, an Italian priest serving at the National Catechists' Training Centre in Khushpur. As of 2008, according to local sources, the movement in Pakistan counted 18 Focolarinas, 11 Focolarinos and about 400 other affiliated members including lay people, nuns and priests. Focolare is a Catholic lay movement whose name means "family hearth" and was present in more than 180 countries and involves more than 2 million people. The movement was recognized by the Catholic Church under the official name "Work of Mary."

The St. Thomas the Apostle Minor Seminary is the preparatory seminary of the diocese.

Joseph Coutts, appointed in 1998, was bishop until June 2012, when he was named Archbishop of Karachi. Pope Francis created Coutts a cardinal priest in the consistory of 28 June 2018, assigning him the titular church of San Bonaventura da Bagnoregio.

The biggest Catholic village in Pakistan, Khushpur, is also located in the diocese. It celebrated its centenary in 2001. Father Parvez Emmanuel was the parish priest at the time. The village has about 7,000 Catholics and produced one bishop, John Joseph of Faisalabad, 20 priests and more than 100 nuns.

On New Year's Day 2008 the diocese inaugurated a Quit Drugs Treatment Center, which offered free treatment and residential facilities to heroin users. The Center accommodates twenty recovering addicts, located beside Holy Rosary Church in Faisalabad. It is the only Church-affiliated drug treatment center in Faisalabad diocese. The center employs 15 people full- or part-time including the doctor, a physical therapist, two nurses, and clerical and maintenance staff.

The Universal Living Rosary Association of St. Philomena USA (ULRA) is also located in the diocese. Rosaries, Medals, Scapulars, Holy Oil, St. Philomena Cord and other printed material are given free of cost. A quarterly newsletter is published by ULRA Pakistan. Afzaal Anwar Khokhar is the ULRA representative for Pakistan. The head office in Pakistan is in Barkatpura, Faisalabad.

On 30 July 2009, tensions arose in the Christian village of Korian after pages containing Islamic inscriptions were found in front of a Christian home. Muslims accused a family there of blasphemy against Islam.

On 1 August 2009, a Muslim mob raided a Christian settlement in Gojra vandalizing and looting houses and causing the deaths of eight people and injuries to many others. Fifty Christian homes were destroyed.

Pope Benedict XVI expressed profound sorrow in 2009 at anti-Christian riots in Pakistan and appealed to everyone to renounce violence and take up again the path of peace. He communicated this message in a telegram to Bishop Coutts.

On 4 August 2009, Fr. Rufin Anthony, the former vicar general of Faisalabad diocese, was appointed coadjutor bishop of the Diocese of Islamabad-Rawalpindi.

On 17 April 2010 the diocese organized a ceremony to celebrate its Golden Jubilee. Archbishop Adolfo Tito Yllana, Apostolic Nuncio to Pakistan, Bishop Joseph Coutts (Faisalabad), Archbishop Lawrence Saldanha (Lahore), and Bishop Andrew Francis (Multan) spoke on the occasion.

On 29 April 2010 Pope Benedict XVI elevated the Apostolic Prefecture of Quetta to the rank of apostolic vicariate. He appointed Fr. Victor Gnanapragasam OMI as apostolic vicar of the new ecclesiastical circumscription and the titular bishop of Timida. Fr. Victor was parish priest in Toba Tek Singh in this Diocese from 1978 to 1980, 1982- to 1986 and 1992 to 1993.

In 2014 Faisalabad diocese had 46 priests working in 23 parishes.

Pope Francis on 3 July 2013 appointed Fr. Joseph Arshad as the bishop of the Faisalabad Diocese.

On 29 June 2019 Pope Francis appointed Father Joseph Indrias Rehmat (born in the Diocese of Faisalabad), at the time Dean of the National Catholic Institute of Theology, as Bishop of Faisalabad.

== Educational institutions ==
The Diocese has over 2,000 teachers working in 62 educational Institutions.

- La Salle High School Faisalabad
- St. Catherine's High School, Faisalabad
- St. Peter's High School
- St. Albert's High School, Gojra
- Convent of Jesus and Mary
- St. Joseph's Technical Institute, Faisalabad
- Convent Girls High School 6/4-L, Okara
- Convent Boys High School 6/4-L, Okara
- Convent degree College 6/4-L, Okara

== Hospitals ==
- St. Raphael's Hospital

   Rosary Christian Hospital 6/4-L, Okara

== Ordinaries ==
- Francesco Benedetto Cialeo, O.P. † (13 Apr 1960 Appointed - 8 Sep 1976 Retired)
- Paolo Vieri Andreotti, O.P. † (8 Sep 1976 Appointed - 9 Jan 1984 Resigned)
- John Joseph † (9 Jan 1984 Appointed - 6 May 1998 Died)
- Joseph Coutts (27 June 1998 Appointed - 25 January 2012)
- Rufin Anthony † (Diocesan Administrator) (26 January 2012 – 2 July 2013)
- Joseph Arshad (3 July 2013 – 8 December 2017); transferred to the Diocese of Islamabad-Rawalpindi
- Joseph Indrias Rehmat (29 June 2019 - )

== See also ==
- Catholic Church in Pakistan
