= Presentation (disambiguation) =

Presentation is the process of presenting the content of a topic to an audience.

Presentation may also refer to:

== Biology and medicine ==
- Presentation (medical) referring to the initial symptoms or signs
- Presentation (obstetrics) in obstetrics
- Lordosis behavior, a body posture adopted by some mammals during estrus that is commonly referred to as "presenting"

== Computing and technology ==
- Corel Presentations, a slideshow, presentation and graphics editing software similar to PowerPoint
- Presentation program, computer software used to make presentations, such as Microsoft PowerPoint
- Presentation (software), an application used to create neurobehavioral experiments
- Presentation layer, in computer networking, the sixth level of the seven layer OSI model

== Religion ==
- Presentation of Jesus at the Temple, in the Bible, when Jesus was brought to the temple forty days after his birth
- Presentation of Mary, an event recognized by the Eastern Orthodox and Catholic Churches, mentioned in the Infancy Narrative of the Gospel of James
- Right of presentation (Latin: ius praesentandi), a right of patronage in the canon law of the Catholic Church

== Other uses ==
- Presentation (philosophy), a synonym for mental representation
- Food presentation, the aesthetics of the appearance of food
- Presentation of a group, in mathematics, a way to describe a group
- Presentation (book), a 1993 collection of stories by Russian writer Andrei Gusev
- "The Presentation" (Hangin' with Mr. Cooper), a 1992 television episode
- "Presentation", the fourth section of the 1976 Rush song "2112"

== See also ==
- Presentation High School (disambiguation), several schools
