= Shahid Kamal =

Pakistani diplomat and civil servant

Ambassador Shahid Kamal
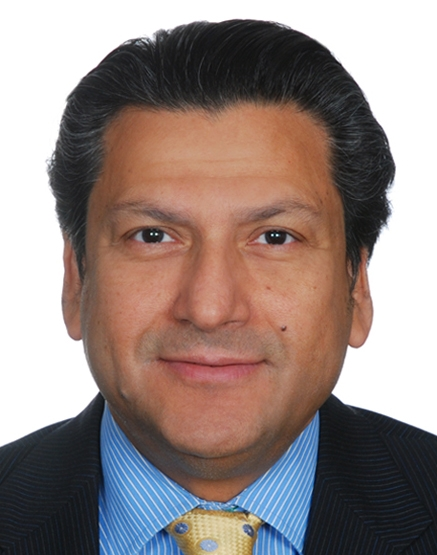
- Born: January 1, 1952 (age 74); Dhaka
- Education: University of London; University of the Punjab
- Occupations: Diplomat and Ambassador in many countries
- Spouse: Samina Kamal

Shahid Kamal (born 1 January 1952) is a retired Pakistani career diplomat. Over his career, he worked in the Ministry of Foreign Affairs; Prime Minister’s Office, United Nations, Organization of Islamic Cooperation (OIC) and Pakistani diplomatic missions in Paris, New York, Washington, Stockholm and Berlin.

He retired from diplomatic service in January 2012. After retirement, Ambassador Kamal was employed by the Islamic Development Bank to work as an adviser.

== Early life and education ==
Born on 1 January 1952, Kamal is the son of Ambassador Kamaluddin Ahmad who joined the first batch of Pakistan Foreign Service in 1948. His father died in 1976 while serving as Pakistan’s Ambassador to Ethiopia. Kamal is also the grandson of Khan Bahadur Naziruddin Ahmed, who was appointed in 1921 as the first Registrar of Dhaka University.

Kamal went to Burn Hall School in Abbottabad and St. Mary’s Academy in Rawalpindi. He earned his graduate degree in international relations from the University of London. He has master's degree in political science as well as master's degree in history from the University of the Punjab.

== Diplomatic career ==
Kamal started out his diplomatic career in 1980 as the Second Secretary at Embassy of Pakistan in Paris. From 1984 to 1986, he served as Consul at the Consulate General in New York City. He then moved on to become First Secretary at the United Nations until 1987. He then served in various positions back in the Ministry of Foreign Affairs in Islamabad until 1991.

From 1991 until 1994, Kamal worked as a Senior Aide in the Prime Minister's Office with primary responsibility for foreign affairs from 1991 to 1994. In this capacity, he served in the administration of three Prime Ministers. He then moved on to become an advisor to Secretary General of the Organization of Islamic Cooperation (OIC) in Jeddah, Saudi Arabia until 1998. He was involved in OIC's peace and reconciliation efforts in Afghanistan, Somalia and Tajikistan. After that, Kamal became Deputy Chief of Mission at the Embassy of Pakistan, Washington, D.C. until 2000.

In 2001, Kamal was made Pakistani Ambassador to Sweden, Finland, Estonia and Latvia. He served in that role until 2005. Kamal was the Pakistani Ambassador to the Federal Republic of Germany from 2007-2012.

He retired from diplomatic service in January 2012.

=== Climate Change ===
Kamal represented Pakistan in the U.N. Climate Change negotiations and has taken active interest in promoting awareness of the impacts of climate change.

=== Humanitarian work ===
Kamal was Chief Coordinator of the Foreign Office in organizing an International Donor’s Conference in Islamabad in November 2005 to mobilize resources for rehabilitation and reconstruction of earthquake devastated areas following the 2005 Kashmir earthquake. After the 2010 Pakistan floods, Ambassador Shahid Kamal played an active role in raising funds in Germany for relief work in Pakistan.

=== Cultural activities ===
Shahid Kamal, in his various capacities over the years, has been highlighting the cultural traditions and values of Pakistan.

=== Publications ===
Ambassador Kamal is author of several articles. Of special repute is a paper on the "Crisis of Governance in Pakistan" published in 2000 by the National Institute of Public Administration in Lahore, Pakistan.

== Honours and positions ==
- Honorary Advisor to the Higher Education Commission of Pakistan
- Member of the Advisory Council at the Centre for Entrepreneurial Development, Institute of Business Administration in Karachi.
- Founding member of the World Dignity University, a project launched by the Human Dignity and Humiliation Studies Network.
- Distinguished Fellow of New Westminster College, British Columbia, Canada.
- Member of the Advisory Group at the Centre for Advanced Studies in Telecommunications at COMSATS Institute of Information Technology at Islamabad, Pakistan

== Personal life ==
He is married to Samina Kamal, former official of United Nations Development Program (UNDP). They have two daughters, Sara Kamal and Sofia Kamal.

Kamal speaks fluent English, French, Urdu and conversational Spanish.

== See also ==
- Human Rights Commission of Pakistan
