= St. Lawrence's Boys' School =

Private school in Karachi

Location
- Pedro D'Souza Road, Garden East, Jamshed Town; Karachi, Sindh; Pakistan
- Coordinates: 24°52′47″N 67°01′57″E

Information
- Type: Private primary and secondary school
- Religious affiliation: Roman Catholic
- Established: 1950 (76 years ago)
- Founders: Franciscan Missionaries of Mary
- Sister school: St. Lawrence's Girls' School
- Authority: Board of Secondary Education, Karachi
- Oversight: Catholic Board of Education
- Principal: Vincent Thomas
- Staff: 10 general staff
- Faculty: 48 teachers
- Gender: Boys
- Age: 4 to 16
- Enrollment: 1,068 (in 2010)
- Website: slbs.edu.pk

St. Lawrence's Boys' School is a private Catholic primary and secondary school for boys located in Karachi, Sindh, Pakistan. Established in 1950, the school is owned by the Roman Catholic Archdiocese of Karachi.

== History ==
Soon after St. Lawrence's Parish opened in 1929, two schools were started to serve the community.

The parish opened the Infant Jesus School managed by the Daughters of the Cross. It had nursery and primary school classes. The Jufelhurst school, although privately owned, had classes up to the matriculation and senior Cambridge levels. At the primary level, it had boys as well as girls.

Although both accepted boys at the primary level, a separate parish school for boys from the primary level upwards was required. In December 1950, the parish priest Fr. Victorino Fernandes started St. Thomas's School in a room of the parish house. He changed the name to St. Lawrence's Boys' School in 1951.

In 1954, Fr. Joshua Sterk became the principal and took the school a step forward, advancing to class IX at the beginning of scholastic year 1954–55. It was towards the end of the year that the school was visited for the first time by representatives of the Catholic Board of Education.

During the nationalisation of all schools and colleges in the country by the government in August 1972, the school, although originally on the nationalisation list, was later removed from the list.

== Principals ==
- Mgr Victorino Fernandes – 1950–1951
- Fr. Francis de Souza – 1951–1954
- Fr. Joshua Sterk OFM – 1954–1968
- Fr. Armando Trindade – 1958–1962
- Fr. Canisius Mascarenhas – 1962–1970
- Fr. Anthony Theodore Lobo – 1970–1974
- Ann D'Souza – 1974–1987
- Fr. Ignatius Pinto – 1987–1988
- Myrtle Lobo – 1988–1992
- Michael Alphonso – 1992–2009
- Vincent D' Souza – since 2009

== Sports ==
The school promotes sports through participating in local events like the Askari Intermediate Inter-school cricket tournament at the KPI Ground on September 23, 2003.

== Genius Champ 2010 ==
In 2011, Basil Naeem of St. Lawrence's won third prize in the 7th International Competition "Genius Champ 2010" in which more than 3,000 participants from all over the country competed.

== Notable alumni ==
- Akbar Agha – author, educator and former diplomat
- Sikander Bakht – cricketer who played for Pakistan as a fast bowler
- Tarek Fatah – author and columnist at the Toronto Sun

== See also ==
- Christianity in Pakistan
- Education in Karachi
- List of schools in Karachi
