= St. Peter's High School, Pakistan =

St. Peter's High School, Toba Tek Singh

Location
- Mubarkabad Colony; Toba Tek Singh, Punjab; Pakistan
- Coordinates: 30°58′16″N 72°28′57″E

Information
- Type: High school
- Religious affiliation: Roman Catholic
- Established: 1967 (59 years ago)
- Founder: Fr. Bonnie Mendes
- Administration: Catholic Board of Education
- Principal: Sister Rubina Louis, RJM
- Affiliations: Roman Catholic Diocese of Faisalabad

St. Peter's High School is a Catholic Pakistani high school in Toba Tek Singh (Punjabi(Shahmukhi)/Urdu: ٹوبہ ٹیک سنگھ), a city and district in the province of Punjab.

== History and operations ==
It was founded in July 1967 in Toba Tek Singh in the Roman Catholic Diocese of Faisalabad, Pakistan. The bishop endorsed the request of the community to found a Catholic school, and with community participation a primary school was begun in the Christian Colony, Toba Tek Singh.

The school was started in a small old chapel. Fr. Bonnie Mendes and some other diocesan educational staff inaugurated the school. Diocesan priests from the Gojra parish ran the school as there was no parish house in Toba Tek Singh. In 1982, a new parish was established called the Immaculate Conception Parish, Toba Tek Singh. The Oblates of Mary Immaculate (OMI) took over the responsibility of the new parish and constructed a building.

When OMI priests moved on to other parishes, Fr. Mendes was transferred from Sacred Heart Parish, Jhang, to Immaculate Conception Parish, Toba Tek Singh.

Fr. Mendes was alarmed at the drop-out rate of Christian students after they completed their primary education. Only about fifteen percent graduated from high school. The community upgraded the school from primary to secondary level, and, in 1994, the first batch of St. Peter's students appeared in the Secondary School certificate exams.

Misereor, a German organization, donated funds to build the first floor of the new high school building with six classrooms, principal's office, staff room, store room, and a toilet block. Added to this were playgrounds, a science laboratory, library, and classrooms. The new high school building opened at Mubarkabad Colony, Toba Tek Singh, in September 1999.

In 2000–2001, two rooms were built on the first floor and, in 2004, a large hall was added. Three classrooms and a toilet block were constructed in January 2006 under a government/community participation scheme.

From 2002 to 2005, the school's staff and faculty enhanced their professional skills through distance-learning programs and skill-based classes.

Mrs. Bimbla Rustam joined the school in 1970 and served as principal till 1988. Mr. Yaqub Hameed joined the school in 1988 as principal and continued until 2002. In 2002, Mr. Ashfaq Fateh was promoted to principal. Mr. Fateh served until 2010 when Miss Tahira Saleem became the school's head teacher.

In June 2015, the Congregation of Jesus and Mary took over the school. Sister Rubina Louis, RJM, was appointed principal and head teacher. Louis is a religious from the congregation with 23 years' teaching experience in the congregation's schools.

== See also ==
- Christianity in Pakistan
- Education in Pakistan
- List of schools in Pakistan
