= St. Thomas the Apostle Minor Seminary =

Roman Catholic seminary in Faisalabad, Pakistan

- Type: Preparatory seminary
- Established: 1981
- Founders: Bishop Paul Andreotti OP
- Religious affiliation: Roman Catholic Diocese of Faisalabad
- Budget: US$ 21,600 (2010)
- Rector: Fr. Khalid Yousaf
- Students: 25 (2019)
- Location: Nalka Kohala, Sargodha Road, Faisalabad, Punjab, Pakistan
- Notable Alumnus: Bishop Joseph Indrias Rehmat

St. Thomas the Apostle Minor Seminary is the preparatory seminary of the Roman Catholic Diocese of Faisalabad in Pakistan.

It was started in 1981 at the initiative of Bishop Paul Andreotti OP in a rented property at Nalka Kohala on Sargodha Road in Faisalabad. Father Bashir Francis was the first Rector. The late Father Giles Amarasekera became the second Rector in 1983.

In 1983, land was purchased for the construction of a new seminary. The dedication of the seminary occurred in 1985 under the leadership of the late Bishop John Joseph. The building being completed in December 1994.

The seminary also plays host to other important events like the ongoing formation program for young priests attended by thirty young priests from various Religious congregations and dioceses from January 21–26, 1990.

Bishop Rufin Anthony, the new bishop of the Roman Catholic Diocese of Islamabad-Rawalpindi was its third Rector.

Father Simon Felix was the fourth Rector. Unfortunate circumstances led to the closing of the seminary in 1999, but it was reopened in 2003.

Father Samuel George was the Rector from 2010 to 2011. The seminary had 18 students at the time. The cost of running the seminary was US$1,800 per month.

In 2012 Fr. Imran Benjamin was the rector. In June 2016, there were 24 students at the seminary.

In 2019, there were 25 students studying at the Seminary.

The seminary receives financial assistance from Aid to the Church in Need. This was acknowledged by Archbishop Joseph Arshad and rector Fr. Kamran Taj. In 2019 Fr. Kamran Taj was appointed rector of Christ the King Major Seminary in Karachi.

== Notable alumni ==
Father Indrias Rehmat, of the Diocese of Faisalabad, named Bishop-elect of the Diocese of Faisalabad in June 2019.
