= Oblates of Mary Immaculate, Pakistan =

Pakistani Roman Catholic religious order

The Oblates of Mary Immaculate are a Roman Catholic religious order for men. The order was founded on January 25, 1816, by Father Eugene de Mazenod to preach missions in Provençal, France.

The Religious in Pakistan work to promote peace and harmony, inter-religious dialogue, human development with programmes of assistance and development and education, as well as pastoral and missionary work.

== History ==
The mission in Pakistan was started in Lyallpur in 1971 by OMI missionaries coming from the Sri Lanka OMI province. The 15 OMI in Pakistan in 2006 included 3 local men, 3 each from Poland, Austria and Canada and 2 from Indonesia. The Oblates also have a community in the Apostolic Prefecture of Quetta.

In 1988 the Oblates had about 20 members in Faisalabad, Hyderabad, Karachi and Multan dioceses.

The Oblates also work in the Roman Catholic Diocese of Islamabad-Rawalpindi, providing Our Lady of Lourdes Minor Seminary with its rector Father J.J. Edwards OMI.

Fr. Victor Gnanapragasam OMI, was appointed the First Apostolic Prefect Of Quetta in December 2001.

In 2009 the number had grown to 23 Oblates including 5 ordinations.

On 29 April 2010 Pope Benedict XVI elevated the Apostolic Prefecture of Quetta to the rank of Apostolic vicariate. He appointed Fr. Victor Gnanapragasam OMI as apostolic vicar of the new ecclesiastical circumscription and the titular bishop of Timida.

On January 25, 2012, Fr. Christi Silva, a Missionary of the Oblates from Sri Lanka, who has been in the service of the Diocese of Multan for over 8 years, was arrested on charges of lacking a valid residence permit. On January 30, 2012, he was released after the authorities were shown valid documentation.
