= Don Bosco Catholic School =

- Bannu, North West Frontier Province; Pakistan

Information
- Type: Primary school
- Religious affiliation: Roman Catholic Church
- Established: 2002
- Founder: Father Leonard Steger MHM
- Administration: Catholic Board of Education
- Principal: Hanook Masih
- Staff: 6
- Gender: boys and girls
- Age: 5 to 11
- Enrollment: 120
- Affiliations: Roman Catholic Diocese of Islamabad-Rawalpindi

The Don Bosco Catholic School (also called St. John Bosco School) is a primary school under the Roman Catholic Diocese of Islamabad-Rawalpindi in Bannu in the North West Frontier Province of Pakistan, 250 kilometers southwest of Islamabad.

Father Leonard Steger, an Italian Mill Hill missionary, built the school in 2002 in an area of around 800 Christian families. More than 120 boys and girls, Christians and Muslims, study in the three-story school building. The teaching staff comprises four Christians and two Muslims.

On September 15, 2007, an explosion damaged the school. No injuries were reported.

In 2008 the school was one of 150 schools attacked by Islamic fundamentalists in Pakistan.

In 2009, Archbishop Lawrence Saldanha of Lahore wrote to the President and Prime Minister of Pakistan and expressed concern over the allowing of Islamic law to be implemented in the area.

In 2014, the school has provided refuge to around 39 Christian families who were displaced by unrest in other areas.
