= St Mary's College, Rawalpindi =

St. Mary's Academy

Location
- Mazhar Qayyum Road; Rawalpindi, Punjab; Pakistan

Information
- Type: Intermediate College
- Motto: "Ne Ardua Terreant" (No Task Is Too Difficult)
- Religious affiliations: Roman Catholic; Church of Pakistan
- Established: 1956
- Founder: Bishop Anthony Theodore Lobo
- Administration: Catholic Board of Education
- Principal: Napoleon Gomez
- Rector: Samson Simon Sharaf
- Gender: Co-educational
- Age: 5 to 18
- Affiliations: Federal Board of Intermediate & Secondary Education

St Mary's College, Rawalpindi is an institute of higher learning established by the Roman Catholic Diocese of Islamabad-Rawalpindi in 2006 to meet the growing educational needs of the region. It was first called the Ave Maria College of Professional and Applied Sciences.

Students from the college and local high school prayed a rosary Pope Benedict XVI led from the Vatican through a special satellite linkup on 10 March 2007. About 100 local students, mostly from the college but also a small group from St. Mary's High School, joined students in Hong Kong, Kolkata in India, Manila in the Philippines, and seven European cities for the two-way telecast. Rome diocese's Pastoral Office for Universities organized the event, titled Intellectual Charity, the Way to Renewed Cooperation between Europe and Asia, with local Churches. Hosted from Paul VI Audience Hall in the Vatican. The occasion was the 5th European Day for Universities. Bishop Anthony Lobo of the Roman Catholic Diocese of Islamabad-Rawalpindi led the gathering of Pakistani students who assembled in the chapel of Boys' Town Hostel at the college.

The Association of Volunteers in International Service is launching a collaboration with Bishop Anthony Lobo, Director of the college. The AVSI support the college, giving many young people the chance to continue their studies and play an active role in Pakistani society.

St. Mary's College has made its niche at the intermediate level. It offers pre-university classes for engineering, medical, computer sciences and business. In 2010 Aheed Naveed Ahmed stood first in whole college scoring 950 marks in the exam of intermediate and his score is still considered as the first. It is affiliated with the Northern Consortium UK for running Business and Engineering classes. The consortium comprises some of the top British Universities with a facility for students to complete 1–2 years in Pakistan and the remaining at the parent British university. Retired Brigadier Samson Simon Sharaf is the Rector of the college.
