= Sargodha Institute of Technology =

Pakistani university

Location
- Sargodha, Punjab; Pakistan
- Coordinates: 32°04′59″N 72°41′40″E

Information
- Type: Technical Institute
- Religious affiliation: Roman Catholic
- Established: 01-08-1958
- Administration: Diocesan Board of Education (DBE)
- Principal: Mr. Zeeshan Ilyas
- Staff: 23
- Gender: Men
- Age: 15 to 65
- Enrollment: 700
- Affiliations: Roman Catholic Diocese of Islamabad-Rawalpindi

Sargodha Institute of Technology is a technical institute located in Sargodha, Punjab, Pakistan. It is owned by the Roman Catholic Diocese of Islamabad-Rawalpindi. It is affiliated with the Punjab Board of Technical Education and Punjab Skill Development Authority.

== History ==
Sargodha Institute of Technology (SIT) was founded in 1959 to provide technical education to the children from the Christian villages of Josephabad and Mariakhel. Initially managed by German volunteers and funded by Misereor, a German agency aimed at combating hunger and poverty, SIT initially offered courses in carpentry, electronics, metalwork, and electricity.

Over time, SIT faced competition from other institutions offering longer, three-year training programs. In response, the institute, under new management and direction from the Bishop Anthony Theodore Lobo, extended its courses to three years. This change led to an increase in student enrollment. The institute provides scholarships to Catholic students, funded by the Diocese of Rawalpindi or the institute itself, and serves students from both Christian and Muslim communities.

In 2009, the SIT was amongst the Christian institutions the Taliban sent letters to warning Christian leaders to convert to Islam or face dire consequences.

In 2010, the Principal was Robinson Daniel. When he took over in 2002 there were 33 students. With the improvements he introduced in 2018 there were over 1000 students.

In 2005, Robinson visited Germany financed by the Catholic aid organization Misereor. They also funded the purchase of new equipment. In addition he was able to ship back equipment donated from Germany, the Netherlands and Switzerland. The equipment in the institute had not been upgraded in over 40 years.

In 2019, the Catholic Church continues to subsidise the institute despite its financial difficulties.

== Diplomas ==
It offers diploma in the following trades:

- Electrical technology
- Mechanical technology
- Civil technology

Also offering short courses in:

- Office management
- Graphic design
- Web designing
- E-commerce
- Call center representative
- Auto cad
- Cad cam
- Technical School Certificate (TSC), also known as Matric Tech.

== List of principals ==
- Rev. Fr. Gerard Verheij (MHM) (1958-1960)
- Rev. Fr. Joseph Van Erp (MHM) (1960-1962)
- Rev. Fr. Karel Heideman (MHM) (1962-1964)
- Rev. Fr. Clemens Van Pinxteren (MHM) (1964-1971)
- Rev. Fr. Ben Pex (MHM) (1971-1978)
- Rev. Fr. John Nevin (MHM) (1978-1980)
- Mr. Yousaf Malik (1980-2002)
- Mr. Robinson Daniel (2002-2018)
- Mr. Surmed Suleman (2018-2021)
- Mr. Rohail Younas (2021-2022)
- Rev. Fr. David John (2022-2023)
- Mr. Zeeshan Ilyas (2023–Present)
