= Notre Dame Institute of Education =

- Other name: NDIE
- Type: Teacher education college
- Established: 1 October 1991; 34 years ago
- Academic affiliations: Australian Catholic University; University of Karachi
- Director: Dr Sherwin Rodrigues
- Academic staff: 30
- Students: 170
- Undergraduates: 110
- Postgraduates: 60
- Location: Karachi, Sindh, Pakistan; 24°51′36″N 67°0′36″E
- Website: www.ndie.edu.pk
- Karachi

The Notre Dame Institute of Education (NDIE) is a teacher education facility in Saddar Town in Karachi, Sindh, Pakistan.

== History ==
NDIE opened in 1991 with 17 students in the Bachelor of Education programme. Average annual enrollments in this are 55, with 30 in the Masters of Education. It is one of only two Catholic tertiary institution in Pakistan, the other being the National Catholic Institute of Theology. NDIE is located on the campus of Saint Patrick's High School, Karachi.

NDIE is the brainchild of Bishop Anthony Theodore Lobo. Keen to bring change to the Pakistani education system, in 1988 he went to Australia to seek help. A visit to Pakistan by Sr. Deirdre Jordan RSM, Chancellor of the Flinders University, Australia, further progressed the work of change and teacher education. She undertook to recruit Australian staff for a small venture by the Catholic Bishops Conference of Pakistan which became the NDIE. NDIE has a local Board of Governors who take responsibility for the direction of the institute.

The first Director was Sr. Gabrielle Jennings, RSM. She was awarded an honorary doctorate by the Australian Catholic University for her work in Pakistan. Women comprise the majority of its students, who are working within the classrooms and at leadership positions within the country and around the world.

== Collaboration ==
In 2006 the Intel Teach Program was introduced by the Intel Corporation to incorporate the effective use of technology in education. In 2008, the Mercy Sisters of Australia supported the development of NDIE's library. It contains about 30,000 volumes although some are outdated. The original library came from the Australian Catholic University and Mercy schools across Victoria. It caters mainly to NDIE students and staff but its doors are open to all teachers from surrounding schools. It is the only library of its kind, with a focus on pedagogy, in Karachi.

== Outreach ==
NDIE also supports an education project in Baldia Town, Karachi, among a minority group of Hindu peasants. Because of their status, the children are not accepted in government schools. The Notre Dame Institute of Education provides two schools for children of various castes, creeds and cultures. The project has helped to employ teachers and build up teaching resources, textbooks and libraries for the schools in Baldia Town. it has its web site www.ndie.edu.pk

NDIE also collaborates with the Education and Literacy Department, Government of Sindh, to train teachers from all over Pakistan to teach English, Mathematics, and Science.

== Development and progress ==
Sister Margaret Madden who has been working in Pakistan since 1995 teaches educational psychology, curriculum studies to the bachelors and masters levels as well as coordinating and designing the Masters in Education programme. She was the director of the Notre Dame Institute in 2001–2011.

She has supervised the passing of hundreds of students with bachelors in Education/International graduate certificates in Education as well as 93 masters in Education graduates. In 2011 she launched a new programme for experienced educators, a master in Educational Leadership. A new director of NDIE Ms Audrey Juma took over when Sister Margaret Madden returned to Australia in 2011.

At a training workshop for teachers organized by the Institute of Education (IOE), University of London in March 2011, Taymur Mirza, Head of The International School said that NIDE was the only promising teachers' training institute in the country.
