= Khadim Hussain Baloch =

Pakistani sports commentator

Personal details
- Born: Khadim Hussain Baloch; 8 July 1939 Karachi, British India
- Died: 9 September 2019 (aged 80) Colchester, Essex; United Kingdom
- Education: St. Patrick's High School, Karachi
- Alma mater: Liaquat Medical College, Jamshoro, Sindh
- Occupation: Cricket Commentator, Writer
- Profession: Doctor

Khadim Hussain Baloch (1939–2019) was a Pakistani cricket commentator, writer, doctor, and honorary advisor to the Pakistan Cricket Board.

== Biography ==
Born on July 8, 1939, in Karachi, Baloch studied at St. Patrick's High School, Karachi and Liaqat Medical College, Hyderabad (now Jamshoro, Sindh). His family was originally from Shikarpur, Sindh. Later, he became a cricketer and captained his college team in the 1961–62 Inter-collegiate tournament.

Baloch began his career in the UK in 1965, where he managed his medical studies along with playing as a cricketer. Concurrently, he wrote articles for the Indus Times in 1959, and later books such as Imran's Summer of Fulfilment (1987), KH Baloch's Encyclopaedia of Pakistan Cricket (2005), and KH Baloch's Journey through the Bibliography of Pakistan Cricket (2010). He also wrote for publications, such as The News International, Dawn, and Wisden Cricket Monthly. His most recognized work include A Century of Karachi Cricket, co-authored with his brother, Mohammed H. Baluch.

In 2004, Baloch was named the honorary advisor to the Pakistan Cricket Board on Archives, Museum, and Library.

== Bibliography ==
- Imran's Summer of Fulfilment (1987)
- KH Baloch's Encyclopaedia of Pakistan Cricket (2005)
- KH Baloch's Journey through The Bibliography of Pakistan Cricket (2010)
- A Century of Karachi Cricket
