= Holy Rosary Church, Quetta =

The Holy Rosary Church, Quetta, Pakistan, is the main church of the Apostolic Prefecture of Quetta.

== History ==
From 1937 to 1939, the parish had an Assistant Parish Priest Fr. Liberius Pieterse, who translated the Bible into Urdu.

Father Anjum Nazir was parish priest of Holy Rosary Church in 2008.

On April 29, 2010, Pope Benedict XVI elevated the apostolic prefecture of Quetta to the rank of apostolic vicariate. He appointed Fr. Victor Gnanapragasam OMI as apostolic vicar of the new ecclesiastical circumscription and the titular bishop of Timida. The new bishop was ordained in this Church in June 2010.

On December 15, 2020, the Cathedral witnessed the funeral of Bishop Gnanapragasam, who died on December 12, 2020, from a heart attack. The funeral service was led by Cardinal Joseph Coutts accompanied by all the bishops of Pakistan. He was buried in the garden of the Cathedral.

On January 1, 2021, Pope Francis named Father Khalid Rehmat OFM (Cap.) as the new vicar apostolic of Quetta. He was consecrated bishop at Holy Rosary Church on March 25, 2021.

== Functions ==
The parish is also home to some innovative programs like computer classes for the youth. The St. Eugene Computer Center, in the compound of the Holy Rosary Church, is run by Oblate Father Maqsood Nazeer. The center offers three-month courses on how to use various programs such as the popular Microsoft Office and Inpage, an Urdu publishing software, for a monthly fee of 300 rupees. It has three computers. The main purpose is to uplift and help Catholic youth.

The parish is also home to the St. Joseph Convent School. In March 2008 the youth of the parish performed a drama at the school to celebrate International Women's Day.
