= Izhar Haider =

Urdu poet, social worker and broadcaster

Izhar Haider (Urdu: اظہار حیدر) was an Urdu poet, social worker and broadcaster who helped to transform Abu Dhabi from a small fishing village to a major city.

== Education and early career ==
Born in Junagadh, India to Professor Zainul Abidin Naqvi in a family of high-profile educationists and professors from Indian Sub-Continent studied in St Patrick's High School, Karachi and graduated from NED University of Engineering and Technology in Karachi. Later, he joined as chief engineer (structural engineering) in 1971 in Abu Dhabi Municipality, shortly before the independence of the United Arab Emirates.

Izhar Haider was part of the team of engineers who built Abu Dhabi. He arrived in Abu Dhabi, when the late president Shaikh Zayed bin Sultan Al Nahyyan was uniting the emirates into the UAE to infuse a new vision in his people and lead them to become one of the world’s most developed and rich nations. He retired in 2004 from Abu Dhabi Municipality.

He was involved in 200 government and private building projects in Buteen.

In addition to being the president of the capital's Pakistani Cultural Centre, he also raised funds for schools and hospitals in Pakistan and helped build a community welfare school in Musaffah for 2,000 underprivileged students.

== Death ==
Izhar Haider died December 23, 2009. He was survived by a daughter, Sadiqa Bano, who lives in Pakistan, and a son Zulfiqar Haider, who resides in Chicago, USA.

== See also ==
- Urdu poetry
