= The Fatwa Girl =

2011 novel by Akbar Agha

- Author: Akbar Agha
- Language: English
- Genre: Romance, political fiction
- Publisher: Hachette India
- Publication date: 25 September 2011
- Publication place: Pakistan
- Media type: Print
- Pages: 232
- ISBN: 93-5009-218-2; 978-93-5009-218-7

The Fatwa Girl is a 2011 novel by Pakistani author Akbar Agha, published by Hachette India. Set in contemporary Pakistan, it follows a young man's attempt to marry the woman he loves amid religious extremism and sectarian conflict.

== Plot summary ==
Omar, a young Sunni man living in contemporary Pakistan, falls for his neighbour Amina, a Shia woman, after watching her defy local custom by riding a bicycle in public. The two are drawn together by their shared opposition to religious extremism and political violence, and they turn to poetry and music as forms of resistance. Their relationship faces strong opposition because of the sectarian divide between their families and the conservative society around them.

Amina becomes an activist and starts a campaign to persuade religious scholars to issue a fatwa declaring suicide bombing forbidden (haram) in Islam. That campaign earns her the nickname "the Fatwa Girl".

== Reception ==
The novel was listed at No. 7 on the Indo-Asian News Service bestseller list in November 2011, and appeared on The Hindu's bestseller list in January 2012.
