= St. Francis Grammar School =

St. Francis' Grammar School
- مکتب گرامر سینٹ فرانسس
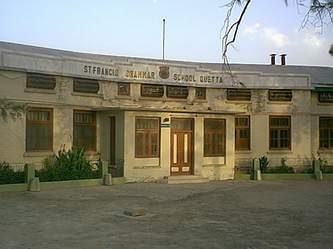

Location
- Zarghoon Road, Quetta, Baluchistan; Pakistan; 30°12′04″N 67°00′34″E

Information
- Type: Private primary and secondary school
- Religious affiliation: Catholicism
- Patron saint: Saint Francis of Assisi
- Established: 1936; 90 years ago
- Oversight: Catholic Board of Education; Catholic Apostolic Prefecture of Quetta
- Principal: Celine qasim
- Grades: Kg-10th matric and Cambridge
- Enrollment: 2000 (2009)
- Campus size: Largest school in balochistan

St. Francis' Grammar School is a private Catholic secondary school located in Baluchistan, Pakistan. The school is situated on the Zarghoon Road (formerly known as Lytton Road). The school has playgrounds, hostel facilities (till the 80s), and a well stocked children's library.

== History ==
The school was founded in 1936 by Msgr. Salesius Lemmens OFM, Apostolic Prefect to educate the children of British soldiers stationed in the area. The school had the distinction of having Father Liberius Pieterse as Assistant Principal from 1937 to 1939 who translated the Bible into Urdu.

== Alumni ==
- Major General Shakil Ahmed, Bangladesh Rifles
- Justice iftikhar Chaudhry
- Air Commodore Sajad Haider, Pakistan Air Force official
- Zafarullah Khan Jamali, former prime minister of Pakistan
- Anwaar ul Haq Kakar, former prime minister of Pakistan, and Senator
- Suresh Oberoi, actor
- Ashraf Jehangir Qazi, Pakistani diplomat
- Muzaffar Hussain Shah, former chief minister of Sindh and Speaker of Sindh Assembly
