= Presentation Convent High School, Sargodha =

Presentation Convent High School
- Sargodha; Pakistan

Information
- Type: Private school
- Established: 1946
- Administration: Catholic Board of Education
- Principal: Sr. Parveen Barkat
- Staff: 250
- Enrollment: 3500
- Affiliations: Roman Catholic Diocese of Islamabad-Rawalpindi.

Presentation Convent High School, Sargodha, Pakistan, was founded by the Presentation Sisters and is regulated by the Catholic Board of Education under the Roman Catholic Diocese of Islamabad-Rawalpindi.

== History ==
On 8 September 1895, the first Presentation Convent School in the Punjab was opened by three Irish religious sisters. Currently in Pakistan there are Presentation schools catering for the educational needs of around thirteen thousand children in Urdu- and English-medium schools, in Rawalpindi, Murree, Jhelum, Peshawar, Khushab District, Wah, Risalpur, Mingora (Swat) and Sindh.

== Results ==
A student of the Presentation Convent School shared the top position with another student in the matriculation exam of the Board of Intermediate and Secondary Education in 2008.

In the Secondary School Certificate Examination 2009, a student got overall top position amongst 69,851 students, obtaining almost 98%. At a prize ceremony held in the office of the Sargodha Board of Intermediate and Secondary Education on 1 August 2009, Mrs. Zakia Shahnawaz, Special Advisor to the Chief Minister of the Punjab was the Chief Guest and Mr. Rai Zaghaim Ali Ejaz, the Commissioner of Sargodha Division was the Guest of Honour. The student was awarded prizes of a computer, a gold medal, cash award of 20,000 Rupees, and a Merit Certificate.

In 2013 a new record has been made by this institution. Since establishment, the school got 3 out of first 4 positions in the SSC Exams held by the Sargodha Board of Intermediate & Secondary Education. The credit goes to Sr. Sheila Keane (former Principal) and the teachers who. Due to their efforts the school was able to get 1st, 3rd and 4th. position in the annual exams.

In 2014, Maham Sabir secured overall first position jointly with two students of other schools, according to the Board of Intermediate and Secondary Education, Sargodha, declaring the results of the secondary school examination.

Once again in 2017 the school had a student in the top 3 positions. The Sargodha Board of Intermediate and Secondary Education announced that in the annual matriculation examination Manal Shaukat secured the third position.

== Facilities ==
To cater to the residential needs of students from outside the city, a hostel forms a part of the campus.

During the period of 2010 to 2013, different types of the civic facilities have been provided by the management. Mr. Naeem Paul, the Manager Admin and Accounts did a great job and implemented the orders of Sr. Sheila Keane. New washrooms were made for students, teachers, and staff. The Canteen has been renovated after 40 years. The Library has been upgraded and other facilities have been provided. Computerized fee and receipts system has been launched, Multimedia and LED display facilities were provided.

During Climatic changes and global warming in 2022, the aftermath of this catastrophe has also imparted to disrupt orderly routines and nevertheless had a great effect on the rooftop of the school causing great damage and leakages. Under the kind patronage of Principal Sr. Parveen Barkat and Accountant Mr. Faaiz Yousuf, these aftermaths were dealt with well. However, the ever-biggest infrastructure expansion was done in September 2022, which was the Installation of a Solar power supply system for the whole school and the rebuilding of the nursery class.
