= Presentation Convent School, Jhelum =

Presentation Convent High School
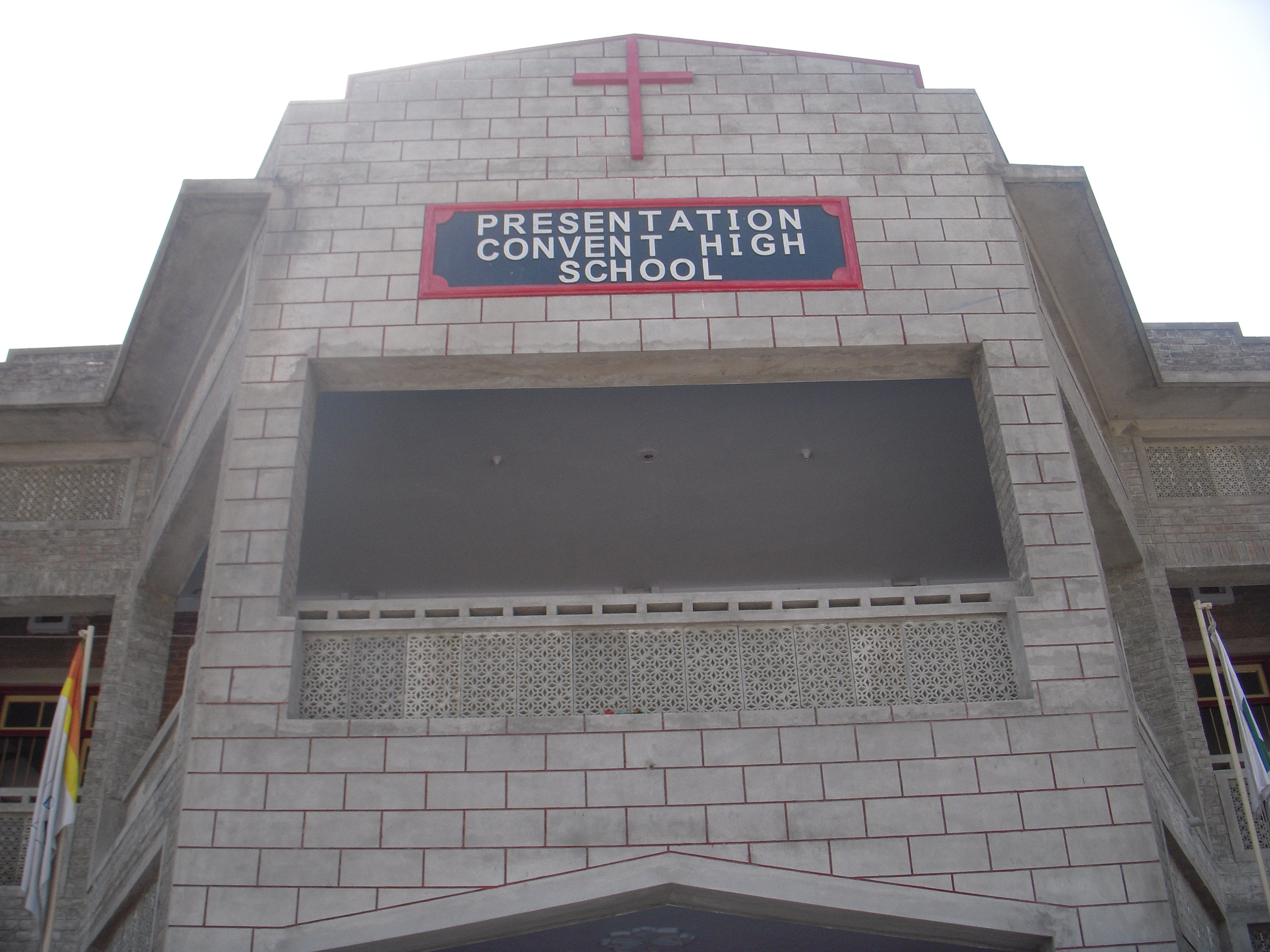
- Jhelum; Pakistan

Information
- Type: Private school
- Chair: Catholic Board of Education
- Principal: Sr. Bina
- Gender: Girls and boys
- Age: 4 to 16
- Enrollment: 1700 (2009)
- Affiliations: Roman Catholic Archdiocese of Lahore; Board of Intermediate and Secondary Education, Rawalpindi

Presentation Convent High School, Jhelum, is a school located in Jhelum Cantonment. It was founded by the Presentation Sisters and is regulated by the Catholic Board of Education under the Roman Catholic Archdiocese of Lahore.

== History ==
On 13 January 1950, four sisters arrived in Jhelum, one of the smallest cities in Pakistan. They laid the foundation of the Presentation Convent School. There were two big compounds with mud huts on both, and Jada Road lay between them. The school was opened in May. By 1962, Sr. Anne Broderick had, with the help of contractor Mohammad Sharif Bhatti, replaced all the mud huts with the new buildings. By degrees, other extensions were made to provide the school the city has today. Most of their students (Christians) have decided to follow in the footsteps of Nano Nagle as Presentation Sisters.

The Presentation story in Pakistan began in 1895 in Rawalpindi, which was then the part of the subcontinent, when Mother Ignatius McDermott, Sr. Xavier Lonergan and Sr. Evangelist Coatsworth arrived from Madras. The school opened on 1 October with three sisters and three pupils. As the years passed, many Irish girls came to join the sisters.

On 8 September 1895, the first Presentation Convent School in the Punjab was opened by three Irish sisters. Today in Pakistan there are Presentation schools catering for the educational needs of around 13,000 children in Urdu- and English-medium schools. Presentation schools are Rawalpindi, Murree, Peshawar, Sargodha, Khushab Distt., Wah, Risalpur, Mingora (Swat) and Sindh. In 2009, 1700 students were enrolled in the school. The principal was Sr. Riffat Sadiq and is Sr. Shameem now.

== Jhelum School ==
There are separate campuses for boys and girls. This is primarily known as a girls' school.

The boy's section has five classes, from 1 to 5.

In the girl's section, classes start from Kindergarten to 10th. Each class is further divided into three sections, A, B, and C.

The students are divided into four houses:

- Mother Teresa
- Fatimah Jinnah
- Florence Nightingale
- Nano Nagle

In 2009, 1700 students were enrolled in the school. The principal was Sr. Riffat Sadiq.

On 13 January 2012, the school celebrated its 62nd anniversary.

In 2013, Sr Shameem became the new principal.

In 2020, Sr Bina became the new principal.

== Notable alumni ==
- Masood Aslam, Sitara-i-Jurat, Colonel Commandant of the Punjab Regiment of the Pakistan Army.
