= Presentation Convent School, Peshawar =

Presentation Convent High School
- Arbab Road, Peshawar Cantt; Peshawar, Khyber Pakhtunkhwa; Pakistan

Information
- Type: Private School
- Motto: NON SCHOLAE SED VITAE DISCIMUS (Not for school only but for life we learn.)
- Established: 1st October, 1913
- Founders: Mother Josephine O’Shea
- Administration: Catholic Board of Education
- Principal: Sister Rehana Mehnga

Presentation Convent School, Peshawar, was founded On 24th September 1913 when Presentation Sisters Mother Josephine O’Shea, Mother Columba O’Sullivan, Sister Laurence O’Reilly and Sister Teresa McDonagh arrived in Peshawar. A week later, on Monday, 1st October, 1913, the Presentation Convent School Peshawar opened with 15 students. This was the first English medium school in the whole of the NWFP (as it was called at that time).

Mother Josephine O'Shea founded the new institution Peshawar and Mother Columba O’Sullivan was appointed the first principal of the school. She worked in the role for ten years until she was asked to pioneer the mission in Quetta, in 1923.

The amount of local students kept increasing and some local teachers were employed. In 1938, the sisters opened St. Francis Xaviour’s College in the building next door, which was lost in 1967. This was the first female college in KPK.

Today in Pakistan there are many Presentation schools catering for the educational needs of around thirteen thousand children in Urdu- and English-medium schools. There are Presentation Convent schools in Rawalpindi, Murree, Jhelum, Sargodha, Khushab, Wah, Risalpur, Mingora (Swat), Hassanabdal, and in Tando Allah Yar, Khipro and Tando Adam in Sindh.

A bomb hoax created panic in the Presentation Convent School on The Mall on May 10, 2002.

In 2006, a mob attacked the school and set it on fire. A car was badly damaged and school funds, computer equipment, a mobile phone and medicine were stolen. Bishop Anthony Lobo of Islamabad-Rawalpindi visited the School on February 16 to assess the damage.

== Alumni ==
- Naseerullah Khan Babar, a former Interior Minister of Pakistan
- Reham Khan, Journalist
