= Rufin Anthony =

Pakistani Roman Catholic bishop

His Grace Rufin Anthony
- Bishop of Islamabad-Rawalpindi
- Church: Roman Catholic
- See: Roman Catholic Diocese of Islamabad-Rawalpindi
- In office: 2009–2016
- Predecessor: Anthony Theodore Lobo
- Previous posts: Rector, Christ the King Seminary (Pakistan)

Orders
- Ordination: 29 June 1969 by Bishop Nicholas Hettinga
- Consecration: 21 September 2009 by Archbishop Adolfo Tito Yllana

Personal details
- Born: 12 February 1940 Khushpur, Lyallpur District, British India
- Died: 17 October 2016 (aged 76) Islamabad, Pakistan

Rufin Anthony (12 February 1940 – 17 October 2016) was a Pakistani Roman Catholic bishop.

== Early life ==
Anthony was born in Khushpur, Lyallpur District, British India (now in Faisalabad District, Pakistan). He completed his primary and secondary education in his hometown of Khushpur and received his religious training at the St. Pius X Minor Seminary in Quetta and the Christ the King Major Seminary, Karachi.

Anthony was ordained a priest of the Roman Catholic Diocese of Faisalabad on 29 June 1969. Additionally, he studied at the Pontifical Urbaniana University in Rome, where he obtained a Licentiate in Spirituality.

== Career ==
The former vicar general of the Faisalabad diocese, he was appointed Coadjutor Bishop of the Roman Catholic Diocese of Islamabad-Rawalpindi by Pope Benedict XVI on 4 August 2009. The Bishop-elect had served as formator and spiritual director at St. Pius X Minor Seminary in Quetta and as a professor at the Major Seminary in Karachi. He had also served as national director of the Pontifical Mission Societies. He later served as rector of St. Thomas the Apostle Minor Seminary in Faisalabad and the major seminary in Karachi beginning 23 April 2004. He again became vicar general of the Faisalabad diocese in 2005 and was parish priest of Khushpur until the announcement of his new appointment.

Anthony's other appointments included Parish Priest in Chak, Okara (1974–1976), Vicar General of Faisalabad and Parish Priest of the Cathedral of Sts. Peter and Paul (1979–90), Parish Priest of Khushpur (1990–1994), and Parish Priest of Chak (1994–95).

On 21 September 2009, Archbishop Adolfo Tito Yllana, apostolic nuncio to Pakistan, presided at the ordination of Bishop Anthony in St. Joseph's Cathedral, Rawalpindi. More than 1,500 people attended the event. Five days later, hundreds of people gathered in the Cathedral of SS Peter and Paul, Faisalabad, to greet Bishop Anthony, a native of Faisalabad. He took possession of the Diocese of Islamabad-Rawalpindi on 21 September 2009.

On 18 February 2010, Bishop Anthony automatically succeeded Bishop Lobo as Bishop of Islamabad-Rawalpindi upon the latter's resignation. He spoke Italian, English, Urdu and Punjabi.

== Death ==
Anthony died on 17 October 2016 in Rawalpindi. His funeral service was led by Bishop of Faisalabad (Bishop Joseph Arshad), Apostolic Nuncio to Pakistan Archbishop Ghaleb Moussa Abdalla Bader, Bishop of Multan Benny Mario Travas, and Bishop of Hyderabad Samson Shukardin.
