= Presentation College =

Presentation College or Presentation Brothers College can refer to:

== Australia ==
- Iona Presentation College, Perth
- Presentation College, Moe, now part of Lavalla Catholic College
- Presentation College, Windsor, Melbourne

== Grenada ==
- Presentation Brothers College (Grenada)

== Ireland ==
- Presentation Brothers College, Cork
- Presentation College, Bray, County Wicklow
- Presentation College Headford, County Mayo

== Trinidad and Tobago ==
- Presentation College, Chaguanas
- Presentation College, San Fernando

== United Kingdom ==
- Presentation College, Reading, Berkshire, now called Elvian School

== United States ==
- Presentation College, South Dakota, with a branch campus in Minnesota

== See also ==
- Presentation Brothers
- Presentation High School (disambiguation)
- Presentation Sisters
