= Roman Catholic Diocese of Islamabad-Rawalpindi =

Latin Catholic diocese in Pakistan

Coordinates: 33.6000°N 73.0333°E

Diocese of Islamabad-Rawalpindi Dioecesis Islamabadensis-Ravalpindensis اسقف اعظم اسلام آباد-رراولپنڈی

Location
- Country: Pakistan
- Ecclesiastical province: Catholic Archdiocese of Lahore
- Metropolitan: Catholic Archdiocese of Lahore

Statistics
- Area: 178,341 km^{2} (68,858 sq mi)
- Population: Total; Catholics: (as of 2006); 36,522,000; 214,976 (0.5%)
- Parishes: 23

Information
- Denomination: Catholic
- Sui iuris church: Latin Church
- Rite: Roman Rite
- Established: 1947
- Cathedral: St Joseph's Cathedral
- Secular priests: 32

Current leadership
- Pope: Leo XIV
- Bishop: Joseph Arshad
- Metropolitan Archbishop: Sebastian Francis Shaw

The Diocese of Islamabad-Rawalpindi (Lat: Dioecesis Islamabadensis-Ravalpindensis) is a diocese of the Latin Church of the Catholic Church in Pakistan.

The diocese has a long history, as it was originally erected in 1887, as the Apostolic Prefecture of Kafiristan and Kashmir. The prefecture was erected from the Diocese of Lahore.

In 1947, the Apostolic prefecture was elevated to a full diocese, and renamed the diocese of Rawalpindi.

In 1952, Kashmir was lost to the diocese, and a new diocese created from territory in Rawalpindi and Lahore to create the Apostolic Prefecture of Kashmir and Jammu.

In 1979, the name was changed to the Diocese of Islamabad-Rawalpindi. The diocese is a suffragan of the Archdiocese of Lahore. It comprises the Khyber-Pakhtunkhwa Province, the Federally Administered Tribal Areas, Azad Kashmir and the Northern Areas, Gujrat District of Gujranwala Division, the Rawalpindi Division, and the Sargodha Division. At the time there were only 16 priests to minister to the Catholics in the diocese.

The principal church of the diocese is the St. Joseph's Cathedral, Rawalpindi.

The Diocese has a population of about 35 million, including 250,000 Catholics many of whom are committed to education (through its more than 70 schools like the Catholic Public High School in Sangota, in the Swat Valley), training institutes and hospitals.

In 1920 the Medical Mission Sisters set up the 16-bed St. Catherine's Hospital in Rawalpindi under the auspices of the Diocese. The hospital evolved into the Holy Family Hospital and continued to operate under the Diocese until 1977. In that year the diocese was no longer able to bear the financial burden of running the hospital and handed it over to the Government of Punjab. The Medical Mission Sisters went to work at the Holy Family Hospital, Karachi.

In 1996 the Diocese opened Our Lady of Lourdes Minor Seminary which is its preparatory seminary.

In 2009, 31 priests served a declining population of 180,000 Catholics. The third largest Catholic diocese of Pakistan is divided into 19 parishes.

The former vicar general of the Diocese of Faisalabad, Father Rufin Anthony, was appointed Coadjutor Bishop to Bishop Anthony Theodore Lobo of the Diocese of Islamabad-Rawalpindi by Pope Benedict XVI on 4 August 2009. He succeeded Bishop Lobo as Bishop of Islamabad-Rawalpindi upon the acceptance by Benedict of Lobo's resignation on Thursday, 18 February 2010.

In August 2010 the heaviest rains in 80 years caused the worst flooding the country has ever seen, affecting much of the Diocese. Catholic Relief Services, Pakistan had to evacuate staff quarters in the Khyber-Pakhtunkhwa region due to the flooding in the province. A team of Caritas Pakistan also travelled to Peshawar to assess the situation and follow up with relief aid. The Sisters of the Daughters of St. Paul congregation also distributed religious as well as food items in Nowshera, one of the 10 districts in Pakistan most severely affected by the floods.

In 2016, the Diocese initiated the cause for the beatification of Shahbaz Bhatti making him a Servant of God in the Catholic Church. Bhatti was a Christian politician who dedicated his life to the service of the underprivileged and was assassinated in 2011.

In January 2020, the diocese organized a preparatory course to help Catholics enter the civil service. 26 students, mostly women, attended in the course held at St Mary's Cambridge School, Rawalpindi.

== Ordinaries ==
- Domenico Wagenaar, M.H.M. † ( 1901 Appointed - 1915 Died)
- Robert J. Winkley, M.H.M. † (24 Oct 1916 Appointed - 1 Nov 1930 Died)
- Giuseppe Patrizio O'Donohoe, M.H.M. † (26 Jan 1934 Appointed - 1947 Died)
- Nicholas Hettinga, M.H.M. † (24 Jul 1947 Appointed - 26 Dec 1973 Died)
- Simeon Anthony Pereira † (17 Dec 1973 Appointed - 22 Mar 1993 Appointed, Coadjutor Archbishop of Karachi)
- Anthony Theodore Lobo † (28 May 1993 Appointed - 18 Feb 2010 Resigned); Bishop Emeritus
- Rufin Anthony † (18 Feb 2010 - 17 Oct 2016 Died ); had previously been Coadjutor Bishop
- Joseph Arshad (8 Dec 2017 -) previously Bishop of Faisalabad

== Educational Institutions in the Diocese ==
The Church has more than 90 educational institutes in North West Frontier Province, Rawalpindi, Sargodha, Jhelum, Gujrat. Khgtrian, Khushab and the Federal Capital.

=== Schools ===
- St Mary's Academy (Rawalpindi)
- St Mary's Cambridge School
- Convent of Jesus and Mary (Murree)
- Don Bosco Catholic School, Bannu, NWFP
- Catholic Public High School, Sangota, NWFP
- St. Mary's High School, Peshawar
- Presentation Convent, Rawalpindi
- Presentation Convent High School, Murree
- Presentation Convent School, Peshawar
- Presentation Convent High School, Sargodha
- Sargodha Catholic High School, Sargodha
- Saint Pauls Boys High School, Sargodha
- Saint Peter High School, Sargodha
- Saint John Bosco School, Sargodha
- Saint Treasa School, Sargodha
- Saint Padre Pio School, Sargodha
- Saint Ann's School, Sargodha
- Saint Philips School, Sargodha
- Saint Thomas School, Sargodha
- St. Michael's High School, Peshawar
- St. Mary's High School, Gujrat (Since 1958)

=== Tertiary Institutions ===
- Sargodha Institute of Technology
- St Mary’s College, Rawalpindi

== Communal violence ==
St. Thomas’ Church, Wah Cantt was attacked by a group of armed men on 28 March 2011 which resulted in damages. It is believed that the incident was related to the recent episode of the burning of the Quran by Pastor Terry Jones in the U.S.

== Notable people ==
- Romana Bashir, active since 1997 in interfaith harmony and women's education.
- Samson Simon Sharaf, retired Army officer and military scientist.
- Father Khalid Rehmat OFM (Cap.), Vicar Apostolic of Quetta.

== Related sites ==
Diocesan Board of Education
