= Norma Fernandes =

Pakistani teacher (died 2024)

Norma Fernandes, TI
- Died: 6 January 2024 (aged 88)
- Education: St Joseph's Convent School, Karachi
- Occupation: Teacher
- Known for: Headmistress (Junior Section) of the Karachi Grammar School
- Awards: Tamgha-i-Imtiaz

Norma Fernandes, TI (died 6 January 2024) was a Pakistani teacher from Karachi.

== Biography ==
Fernandes was educated at St Joseph's Convent School, Karachi. She began her career teaching at St Patrick's High School, Karachi. She also was a sportswoman, dramatist, and musician. From 1966 to 2009, she worked first as a teacher and then as Headmistress (Kindergarten/Junior Section) of the Karachi Grammar School. In January 2006, Norma Fernandes was made advisor of Karachi Grammar School, working with the Board, the Principal and the Internal Management Team and also giving confidential advice to parents. In 2009, she retired from the Karachi Grammar School after more than 50 years in education.

In 2013, the Citizens Archive of Pakistan interviewed Fernandes to obtain the story of her service. In a podcast, Fernandes talks about her memories of growing up in Karachi and when her entire family migrated to Canada, but she stayed behind to continue working in education.

On 14 August 2013, the Government of Pakistan announced that it would honour Fernandes on 23 March 2014 with the Tamgha-i-Imtiaz for her services to education. (It is the fourth-highest decoration given to any civilian in Pakistan based on their achievements.)

Fernandes died on 6 January 2024.
