= Akbar Agha =

Pakistani author, educator and diplomat

- Born: March 27, 1943; Karachi, Pakistan
- Occupations: Novelist, educator, diplomat
- Writing career
- Period: 1967–present
- Movements: Postcolonial literature

Akbar Agha (born 1943) is a Pakistani author, educator and former diplomat.

== Biography ==
Agha studied at the University of Karachi, and as an officer of the Pakistan Foreign Service. He served on diplomatic assignments in Asia, Europe and Africa and currently divides his time between Karachi and Mexico City.

Akbar Agha was born in Dadu, Pakistan. He is the son of Ghulam Hussain Kadirdad Agha, OBE a distinguished officer of the Civil Service of India and later chairman of the Sindh Public Service Commission.

He attended St. Lawrence's Boys School and St. Patrick's College (Karachi). He then attended Karachi University, where he took the Central Superior Services examination and was selected to the Pakistan civil service.

He comes from a distinguished lineage of career government professionals from the Indian sub-continent. His grandfather, Kadirdad Khan Agha, CIE was Vazir of Khairpur state in British India. His uncle Ghulam Dastagir Agha was a Civil Judge in Karachi. His brother Rafiq Hussain Agha was Commissioner of Sukkur and his brother Yusuf Agha was an officer of Pakistan Customs.

His sister-in-law is the celebrated artist Lubna Agha.

== Career ==
Akbar Agha started his career in the Pakistan Foreign Service as a career diplomat. He was posted as Acting High Commissioner to Sri Lanka. His next assignment was Acting Ambassador to Romania, following which he served as Acting Ambassador to Tanzania.

After resigning from the foreign service, he taught at the University of San Luis Potosi in Mexico.

His book, The Fatwa Girl, written in 2011, is a story about sectarian prejudices which dominate life in current day Pakistan and the fundamentalism that threatens to tear society apart. His second novel, The Moon, is slated for release in 2012.

He is currently working on his third novel.

== Bibliography ==
=== Novels ===
- The Fatwa Girl. New Delhi: Hachette. 2011.

=== Articles ===
- "Tamil Tigers and Serendipity". The Friday Times, Karachi, Pakistan. December 25, 2009.
- "Shaking hands with the Devil". The Friday Times, Karachi, Pakistan. December 31, 2009.
