= Liberius Pieterse =

Pakistani-Dutch Franciscan priest (1905–1973)

- Born: 12 February 1905; Wageningen, Holland
- Died: 24 September 1973 (aged 68); Campo Verano, Rome
- Other name: Azad
- Citizenship: Pakistani
- Education: Conservatorium of Music, Rotterdam
- Occupation: Franciscan priest
- Years active: 1929–1973
- Known for: his gift with languages
- Notable work: translation of the Bible into the Urdu language

Liberius Pieterse (12 February 1905 – 24 September 1973) was a Franciscan priest working initially in the Roman Catholic Archdiocese of Bombay and Roman Catholic Archdiocese of Karachi in colonial India and Pakistan, respectively.

== Early life ==
Pieterse was born in Wageningen, the Netherlands on 12 February 1905. He did his schooling in Rotterdam, Schiedam and Utrecht. He studied at the Conservatorium of Music in Rotterdam. He attended the Seraphic School at Sittard from 1926 -1929. He was received in the Order of Friars Minor on September 7, 1929. In 1936 he was ordained a priest, and seven months later he arrived in British India.

He was talented especially in languages, mathematics, music and art. He learned Konkani language, Tamil and Punjabi to get in touch with the working people in society.

== Religious career ==
He started work as assistant in Saint Patrick's Cathedral, Karachi and teacher in St Patrick's High School, Karachi. In 1937 he became the editor of a new monthly "St. Anthony in India". In November 1937 he was transferred to Quetta and was assistant at Holy Rosary Church, Quetta, and assistant principal of St Francis Grammar School. During these years he got in touch with the Urdu speaking Catholics as well as some Pushto speaking non-Christians. Two years later he was transferred to Sanghar as assistant, and also helped in Mirpurkhas, a small station without a resident priest. In 1939 World War II broke out, and since Mgr. Salesius Lemmens had started Portiuncula Friary for the training of the local friars, Pieterse was taken on the teaching staff of the Friary. He taught philosophy, Greek, Hebrew and music.

In July 1941, he was made Parish Priest of Saint Francis of Assisi Parish, Karachi. In February 1944 Fr. Liberius went to Sanghar as Missionary-in-charge. Eight months later he was in Quetta for work among the Urdu speaking, taking charge of the Catholics residing in most of Baluchistan. In 1948 he was in St. John’s Parish, Karachi, and a year later was transferred to Nawabshah. In 1950 he was back at Portiuncula Friary as lecturer in Urdu and organist. From there he went to St. Anthony’s Parish (Karachi) in 1952. In November 1953 he was made a member of the Editorial Staff for Urdu publications based in Multan. At this time that the Catholic Church decided on an official translation of the Bible in Urdu. Fr. Liberius, with two others, set out to do this job. The translation of the Bible into Urdu is mainly his work. In September 1956 he was assistant at St. Anthony's Church, and two years later he was sent to Sanghar as Missionary-in-charge of St. Paul's Church there. In August 1962 he was back at St. Anthony's, Karachi.

Following holidays in Australia, he decided to work in the Roman Catholic Diocese of Multan. He worked for four years in Multan, spending most of his time in liturgical work, translations, and assistance to the priests there in parish work. Here work was started on the Dictionary of Christian Terminology in Urdu in cooperation with the non-catholic churches.

In 1971 he was back in Karachi at Christ the King Seminary (Pakistan) to work with Fr. John Joseph, on a new ecumenical translation of the Bible and the New Roman Missal.

In 1973, he was working full-time for three churches, St. Francis Xavier's, Qayyumabad, St. Theresa's in Korangi Township, and Stella Maris church at Korangi Creek.

He was the only missionary to become a Pakistani citizen.

== Publications ==
As Editor of "Saint Anthony in India", Fr. Liberius wrote many of the articles, especially about the early developments of the Church in Sind and Baluchistan. He also published articles on the establishment of the churches up-country in St. Thomas' Chronicle, a communication paper for the friars in Pakistan and India. In 1947, on the Independence of Pakistan, he published a history of the Church in Sind and Baluchistan entitled: In the Land of the Sindhi and Baluchi.

The work which really made Fr. Liberius known all over the country was the translation of the Bible into Urdu. In the last few years he felt the need to work together with the Bible Society for a new translation of the Bible. He did this with another priest, Fr. John Joseph.

In 1955 he published a hymnal: HAMD-ULLAH (Praise God). This was a book of about 200 pages of hymns in Persian script. In 1972, the book was completely revised and published with the help of G. M. Felix under the name NAYA GEET GAO (Sing a new song).

One important contribution that Fr. Liberius made to the Church in Pakistan is the translation of the Second Vatican Council documents into Urdu. As a member of the Institute for Religious and Social Studies, Karachi, he was mainly responsible for the complete translation of these Documents.

A final work is the Dictionary of Christian Terminology in Urdu. In 1960 Fr. Liberius, together with Fr. Tovias Bastiaanse O.F.M., published a first edition in mimeographed form. The work was progressed with the collaboration of the Christian Study Centre in Rawalpindi and the Institute for Religious and Social Studies in Karachi.

He wrote Urdu poetry under the name of Azad.

On 24 September 1973 he died at Fiumicino Airport, Rome. His funeral took place on 29 September 1973 in the Cemetery Chapel of Campo Verano.
