= Michael Rodrigues (table tennis) =

Pakistani table tennis player

Michael Joseph Rodrigues
Personal information
- Nationality: Pakistani

Sport
- Sport: Table tennis
- Highest ranking: Pakistan Men's Singles national champion in 1957, 1958, 1960, 1961 and 1962
- Current ranking: retired

Michael Joseph Rodrigues was a five-time national table tennis champion of Pakistan winning the National Boys Singles in 1956 and the Men's Singles in 1957, 1958, 1960, 1961 and 1962. In 1962 he was also the Captain of the Pakistan Team at the Asian Table Tennis Championships in Bombay, India. In 1963 he also participated in the Far East Championship.

== Education ==
Of Goan origin, he was educated at St. Patrick's High School, Karachi. He graduated with a medical degree from Dow Medical College, Karachi, in 1965.

== Later life ==
Rodrigues later became a general surgeon and migrated to the USA. He was first licensed to practice through a California license in voluntary service in 1974. He has admitting privileges at Alvarado Hospital, San Diego.
