= St. Joseph's Cathedral, Rawalpindi =

Church in Pakistan

St. Joseph's Cathedral

Religion
- Affiliation: Roman Catholic
- Diocese: Diocese of Islamabad-Rawalpindi
- Leadership: Archbishop Joseph Arshad

Location
- Location: Rawalpindi, Pakistan
- Interactive map of St. Joseph's Cathedral
- Coordinates: 33.5837°N 73.0562°E

Architecture
- Style: red-brick

St. Joseph's Cathedral, Rawalpindi, Pakistan, is the main church of the Roman Catholic Diocese of Islamabad-Rawalpindi.

St. Joseph's Cathedral has large congregations from Rawalpindi, Islamabad and surrounding areas for Good Friday, Easter and Christmas services each year.

The Cathedral parish is also home to St. Catherine's Convent. The Franciscan Missionaries of Mary host the St. Catherine's Sewing Center, training poor women in sewing, crochet and embroidery; the women produce hand-made objects for sale.

== History ==
On 21 September 2009, Archbishop Adolfo Tito Yllana, Apostolic Nuncio to Pakistan, presided at the ordination in St. Joseph's Cathedral, of the new coadjutor bishop of Islamabad-Rawalpindi, Bishop Rufin Anthony. More than 1,500 people attended the event.

In January 2012 a youth group from the Cathedral Parish launched a website "for realising the potential of youth and expressing their concerns in a Christian way", with the hope that it would help counter fundamentalism and fanaticism. Sister Athens Angeles of the Daughters of St. Paul was the main organizer of the group.

Bishop Anthony Theodore Lobo, the former Bishop of the Rawalpindi-Islamabad diocese, died after prolonged illness on 18 February 2013. His funeral was held at Saint Joseph's Cathedral on 20 February. He was buried in the cathedral compound.
