= Presentation Convent High School, Murree =

Presentation Convent High School

Location
- Murree; Pakistan
- Coordinates: 33°53′51″N 73°23′01″E

Information
- Type: Private School
- Administration: Catholic Board of Education
- Affiliations: Roman Catholic Diocese of Islamabad-Rawalpindi.

Founded in 1917 by the Presentation Sisters, Presentation Convent High School in Murree, Pakistan stands as evidence of a century-long dedication to education. This institution is regulated by the Catholic Board of Education under the Roman Catholic Diocese of Islamabad-Rawalpindi.

The origins of Presentation Convent Schools in the Punjab region trace back to September 8, 1895, when the first Presentation Convent School was established by three Irish sisters. Today Presentation Convent Schools are found throughout Pakistan, serving educational needs of approximately thirteen thousand children in both Urdu and English medium schools. They have a presence in various cities including Rawalpindi, Peshawar, Jhelum, Sargodha, (Khushab district), Wah, Risalpur, Mingora (Swat) and Sindh.

In recognition of its historical significance, Presentation Convent High School, Murree, was designated as a historical building in 2014 under the Special Premises (Preservation) Ordinance 1985 by the Punjab Archaeology Directorate General.

== Notable alumni ==
- Shahzada Jamal Nazir, Former Federal Minister.
- Samson Simon Sharaf, Political Economist
- Azmat Hayat Khan, Vice-Chancellor University of Peshawar
- Babar Hayat Tarar, Federal Secretary to the government of Pakistan
