= St. Raphael's Hospital =

Hospital in Faisalabad, Pakistan

- Roman Catholic Diocese of Faisalabad

Geography
- Location: Railway Rd, Sir Syed Town, Faisalabad, Punjab, Pakistan
- Coordinates: 31.415531°N 73.088675°E

Organisation
- Care system: Private
- Type: General and Maternity Hospital
- Religious affiliation: Roman Catholic Diocese of Faisalabad

History
- Opened: 1907

Links
- Lists: Hospitals in Pakistan

St. Raphael's Hospital is the largest general and maternity hospital in Faisalabad, Punjab, Pakistan owned by the Roman Catholic Diocese of Faisalabad.

It was founded by Sisters of Charity of Saint Elizabeth in 1907.

== History ==
In December 1947, Bishop Francis Benedict Cialeo O.P., Bishop of Multan, contacted the Franciscan Missionaries of Mary concerning the Jawalla Dass Charitable Hospital for Women in Lyallpur (now Faisalabad). The owners had been forced to flee, leaving the unfinished, newly built hospital of fifty beds in the care of the Mission, and a hospital for the refugees was urgently needed. He asked the Sisters to take it over immediately.

The Sisters accepted and they travelled from Rawalpindi on 16 January 1948. On 26 January 1948, Sisters Eutichiano and Belen began a small dispensary, while Sisters Priscilla and Michaela began their visits to the refugees living in huts and tents behind the hospital, as well as the refugee camps in other parts of the city.

Dr. M. Eiblin, was the only doctor for two and a half years when a second doctor was employed. Dr. Eiblin worked at the hospital for twenty-three years, and in April 1971 handed over to M. Helene Elizabeth. Dr. Elizabeth, as she came to be known had arrived in Pakistan on 30 May 1961 and worked there for the next forty five years.

A neonatal clinic was begun in January 1952 which had been a long-felt need for a maternity hospital. On 17 September 1957, the Training School for Midwives was started with M. John Kentigern as Tutor and four students.

Periodic visits continued to a leper colony eight miles from St. Raphael's and contact was maintained through such visits until the people could be asked to use the facilities of the hospital.

A workroom was added by Sr. Constantia for girls and young women to learn a skill and earn to help their families and was also a help to support the community. In the 1960s, a regular feature of the Sisters' work was to answer calls to peoples' homes for medical care. There were weekly clinics at Jaranwala, Warispura.

Misereor later donated a fully equipped mobile clinic. A leader was trained to inform the people and help in bringing in patients. As the work in the hospital increased, the use of the mobile clinic decreased. So in 1982, it was given to another organization so that better use would be made of it.

== Current situation ==
During the years the hospital expanded to one hundred beds and improved its facilities with a well-equipped laboratory, a nursery with incubators for babies needing special care and a ventilator for the care of very ill babies.

St. Raphael's is primarily a maternity hospital with provision for general patients of 100 beds. The Midwifery Training School continues to provide the opportunity for Christian girls to receive training. After their training many of them are now working in St. Raphael's as well as in other Hospitals in Pakistan.

A volunteer Doctor from Japan, Dr. Aoki is now in his third year of service at the hospital. He is a pediatrician, specializing in the care of newborn babies.

Many patients are treated free of charge.

== Nursing training ==
A Nurse's Day event at St. Raphael's Hospital was organised on May 14, 2010. The diocesan commission for nurses and the diocesan commission for interreligious dialogue jointly organized the event attended by about 300 nurses, four priests and 20 nuns.

The late Bishop Paul Andreotti of Faisalabad founded the diocesan commission for the nurses in 1982. It helps Christian girls gain admission into the profession, organizes meetings for Christian nurses, and provides counselling for nurses with problems.

Speakers at the event highlighted the difficulties faced by minority women in the nursing profession, which is looked down upon by many in Pakistani society.

There are roughly 500 Christian nurses in Faisalabad diocese which has only one Church-run hospital and two dispensaries. There are seven Catholic hospitals in the country.

On 17 May 2012, the hospital celebrated International Nurses Day with a special meeting with around 150 participants, including priests, nuns, nurses and ordinary citizens. Sister Rufina Gill was the head of St Raphael Hospital at the time.

== Funding ==
In 2012, the Government of Japan provided financial support worth US$123,000 to the hospital for the construction of an Outpatient Department.

In 2013, Japan has extended further financial support worth US$123,000 to this hospital to improve the quality of maternal health care.

A new $83,960 Japanese grant in 2015 will further help improve medical services and acquire X-ray and ultrasound machines.
