= St. Joseph's Technical Institute, Faisalabad =

Technical school in Faisalabad, Pakistan

St. Joseph's Technical Institute
- Faisalabad, Punjab; Pakistan

Information
- Type: Vocational school
- Religious affiliation: Roman Catholic
- Established: 1992 (34 years ago)
- Founder: Father Clement Sethupathy
- Administration: Marist Brothers
- Gender: Male
- Age: 15 to 24
- Enrollment: 45 (as of 1997)
- Campus: Three hectares
- Affiliations: Misereor
- Trades: Motor mechanics, welders and electricians

St. Joseph's Technical Institute is a Pakistani vocational school for motor mechanics, welders and electricians in Faisalabad, Punjab.

== History and operations ==
The institute to train school dropouts was the dream of Father Clement Sethupathy, a Sri Lankan missionary in Pakistan, since 1966. In 1985, he initiated a project that would make technical skills training available to them.

Feasibility studies were done, plans made, and funding agencies contacted over several years. In August 1990, Misereor, the German Catholic bishops' development aid agency, agreed to finance the entire project.

Its first batch of motor mechanics, welders and electricians graduated in 1993, after a single year of operation. The 27 graduates participating in the first commencement ceremonies on October 22, 1993, were addressed by Father Bashir Francis, vicar general of the Roman Catholic Diocese of Faisalabad.

In 1997, there were 45 young men learning and honing their skills in auto mechanics, electrical mechanics, plumbing and welding at the school, which has facilities to train 75 students at a time.

=== Admission ===
To qualify, a youth must be 15 to 24 years of age and must have completed eighth grade in school.

=== Facilities ===
The institute comprises the technical school and a residential Boys' Town. These are complementary and interdependent, both aiming to help young Christian men find more and better opportunities in life.

Spread over three hectares in the suburbs of Faisalabad, the institute houses boarders as well as enrolling day students for technical courses.

=== Administration ===
In 2003, the Marist Brothers took over the management of the institute. On 30 November 2016, the Marist Brothers celebrated their fifty-year presence in Pakistan with a thanksgiving Mass at the institute.

== See also ==
- Christianity in Pakistan
- Education in Pakistan
- List of boarding schools
- List of educational institutions in Faisalabad
