= Apostolic Vicariate of Quetta =

Catholic missionary jurisdiction in Pakistan

Apostolic Vicariate of Quetta Apostolicus Vicariatus Quettensis د کویټې اپوستولیک ویکاریټ

Location
- Country: Pakistan
- Metropolitan: Directly exempt to the Holy See

Statistics
- Area: 347,188 km^{2} (134,050 sq mi)
- Population: Total; Catholics: (as of 2010); 7,296,000; 30,518 (0.4%)

Information
- Denomination: Catholic Church
- Sui iuris church: Latin Church
- Rite: Roman Rite
- Established: 9 November 2001 (As Apostolic Prefecture of Quetta); 29 April 2010 (Apostolic Vicariate of Quetta)
- Cathedral: Pro-Cathedral of the Holy Rosary in Quetta

Current leadership
- Pope: Leo XIV
- Apostolic Vicar: Sebastian Francis Shaw, O.F.M

The Apostolic Vicariate of Quetta (Latin: Vicariatus Apostolicus Quettensis), originally the Apostolic Prefecture of Quetta, is a Latin Church missionary territory or apostolic vicariate of the Catholic Church in Pakistan. It comprises the civil province of Balochistan and the Kachhi region of Punjab, Pakistan.

== History ==
The areas were originally under the jurisdiction of the “Vicariate of the Great Mogul” which was established in 1697. In 1832, the Vicariate formed a part of the Archdiocese of Bombay and in 1878 it passed to the mission of Afghanistan, which had been entrusted to the Mill Hill missionaries. Quetta, in the years to follow would be visited by Jesuits (who left in 1935) and then Franciscans (until 1982). In 1982, the pastoral care of the local community was entrusted to the Missionary Oblates of Mary Immaculate (OMI), later reinforced by Salesians.

Around 1990, the Catholics of Baluchistan had already started asking for a separate diocese. The Prefecture was established on November 9, 2001, from the Roman Catholic Diocese of Hyderabad and the Roman Catholic Archdiocese of Karachi. The first Prefect Apostolic has been Fr. Victor Gnanapragasam of the Oblates of Mary Immaculate. Father Victor was installed in a ceremony presided by Archbishop Alessandro D'Errico, apostolic nuncio to Pakistan, at St. Joseph's Convent School in Quetta. At that time the prefecture had eight priests and 12 Religious serving about 27,000 Catholics.

In 2008, the Prefecture was subdivided into six parishes and serving nearly 30,000 Catholics. In Quetta there are 5 congregations of religious sisters (20 sisters) and 10 priests, including OMIs and Salesians.

On 29 April 2010 Pope Benedict XVI elevated the apostolic prefecture of Quetta to the rank of apostolic vicariate. He appointed Fr. Victor Gnanapragasam as apostolic vicar of the new ecclesiastical circumscription and the titular bishop of Timida. On 21 April 2012, the first ordination of a Catholic priest in Baluchistan took place in St. Pius X Parish Church, Samungli Road, Quetta. Deacon Gulshan Barkat of the Oblates of Mary Immaculate was ordained by Bishop Victor Gnanapragasam, the Vicar Apostolic of Quetta.

== Current situation ==
The main church is the Holy Rosary Church, Quetta. There were seven Catholic schools in the Prefecture in 1998, all under the Baluchistan Catholic Board of Education.

Since 2003, Lac La Biche, Alberta Council in Canada has conducted an annual fundraiser for the Apostolic Prefecture, which is working to develop into a diocese. Over the years, the Knights of Columbus have raised more than $45,000 to support the Prefecture. In 2009, the council also donated two chalices. The Prefecture also runs a home for urgent social service to orphans, abandoned women, and poor families. There are 19 Catholic learning institutions and 14 social institutions (including hospitals, aid centers for marginalized persons, etc.).

The Prefecture is also home to some innovative programs like computer classes for the youth. The St. Eugene Computer Center, in the compound of the Holy Rosary Church is run by Oblate Father Maqsood Nazeer, the parish priest.

Bishop Gnanapragasam died on December 12, 2020, from a heart attack.

== Leadership ==
=== Prefect of Quetta ===
- Bishop Victor Gnanapragasam, O.M.I. (2001 - 2010), see below

=== Vicars Apostolic of Quetta ===
- Bishop Victor Gnanapragasam, O.M.I. (2010 - 2020)
- Bishop Khalid Rehmat, O.F.M. Cap. (2021 - 2026), appointed Archbishop of Lahore
- Archbishop Sebastian Francis Shaw, O.F.M. (since 2026)

== Schools in the prefecture ==
- St Francis Grammar School
- Sacred Heart Girls High School
- St. Joseph's Convent School
