= St. Patrick's High School, Karachi =

St Patrick's High School

Location
- Saddar Town, Sindh; Karachi-74400, Sindh; Pakistan; 24°51′48″N 67°02′03″E

Information
- Motto: Latin: Per Aspera Ad Astra (Through hardships to the stars)
- Religious affiliation: Catholicism
- Established: 16 January 1861 (165 years ago)
- Founder: Fr. Joseph A. Willy, S.J.; Society of Jesus
- Oversight: Roman Catholic Archdiocese of Karachi; Catholic Board of Education
- Principal: Rev. Fr. Mario Rodrigues
- Staff: 350
- Gender: Boy's High School
- Age: 4 to 18
- Enrollment: ~2660 (2025)
- Website: stpats.edu.pk

St Patrick's High School is a Catholic primary and secondary school located in Saddar Town, Sindh, Karachi, Pakistan. Founded by the Jesuits in 1861, the school is the second-oldest school in Karachi. Since 1950, it has been run by the diocesan clergy of the Archdiocese of Karachi.

Since its establishment, the school has produced well-known leaders and public figures, including two Presidents and two Prime Ministers of Pakistan, two Chief Ministers of Sindh, one Deputy Prime Minister (of India), two Cardinals of the Catholic Church, one Chairman of the Joint Chiefs of Staff Committee (of Pakistan), and several Mayors of Karachi.

The school is run in collaboration with University of Karachi, Roman Catholic Church and managed by the Catholic Board of Education in Pakistan.

== History ==
The school was established on 6 May 1861, began with just three students, and officially registered as a high school in 1867. Its founder was Reverend Joseph A. Willy of the Society of Jesus (the "Jesuits"), who controlled the school until June 1935. It was then taken over by the Franciscan order until 6 October 1950. Since 1950, it has had Pakistani principals belonging to the Roman Catholic Archdiocese of Karachi.

Fr Stephen Raymond, a diocesan priest, became the first Pakistani principal of his alma mater in 1950. The era of Fr Raymond as principal from 1950 to 1974 is referred by many old students as the "golden era" of St Patrick's. Fr Raymond is credited with constructing the Cambridge Building (1950), St Patrick's College (1952), the Teachers' Training College (1959), the first School Auditorium (1972). The school celebrated its centenary in 1962 with the President of Pakistan, Field Marshal Mohammad Ayub Khan as the Chief Guest.

St Patrick's High School was one of the few private educational institutes that escaped nationalization in 1972.

On 6 May 2011, the former students of the school instituted the Father Stephen Raymond Gold Medal to be awarded to the top student from the Commerce Section, as part of the 150th anniversary of the school.

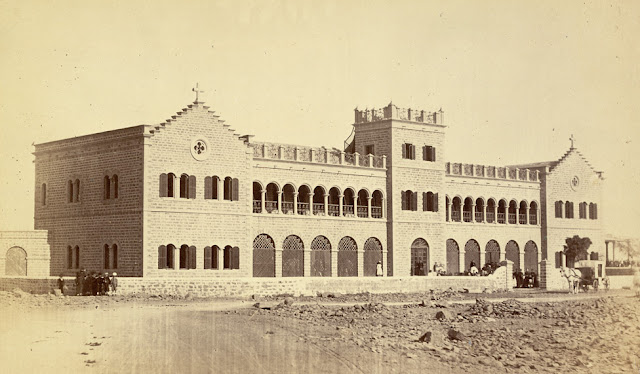
Exterior of St Patrick's School, Karachi -1873

== Former principals ==
- Fr. Joseph Willy SJ 1861-65
- Fr. Basilius Haefly SJ 1865-1867
- Fr. Anselm Leiter SJ 1867-68
- Fr. Nicolas Pagani SJ 1868-72
- Fr. George Bridges SJ 1872-74
- Fr. Joseph Nueckel SJ 1874-76
- Fr. Francis Belz SJ 1876-87
- Fr. A. Bruder SJ 1887-94
- Fr. H. Jurgens SJ 1894-97
- Fr. A. Martins SJ 1897-1901
- Fr. C. Flick SJ 1901-04
- Fr. J. Meyer SJ 1904-09
- Fr. S. Boswin SJ 1909-21
- Fr. Hoogewerf SJ 1921-26
- Fr. Vincent Gimenez SJ 1926-35
- Fr. Achilles Meersman OFM 1935–38
- Fr. Hermes Kersten OFM 1938-1939
- Fr. Modestine Pöttgens OFM 1939-1948
- Fr. Achilles Meersman OFM 1948-50
- Stephen Raymond -1950-1975
- Anthony Theodore Lobo – principal 1975–1993
- Oswin Mascarenhas - 1993 to 2000
- Joseph Paul – principal 2000–2009
- Lawerence Manuel FSC 2016-17
- Sister Margaret Madden 2017-2020
- Anthony F. D'silva 2020-2023

== Commemorative stamp ==
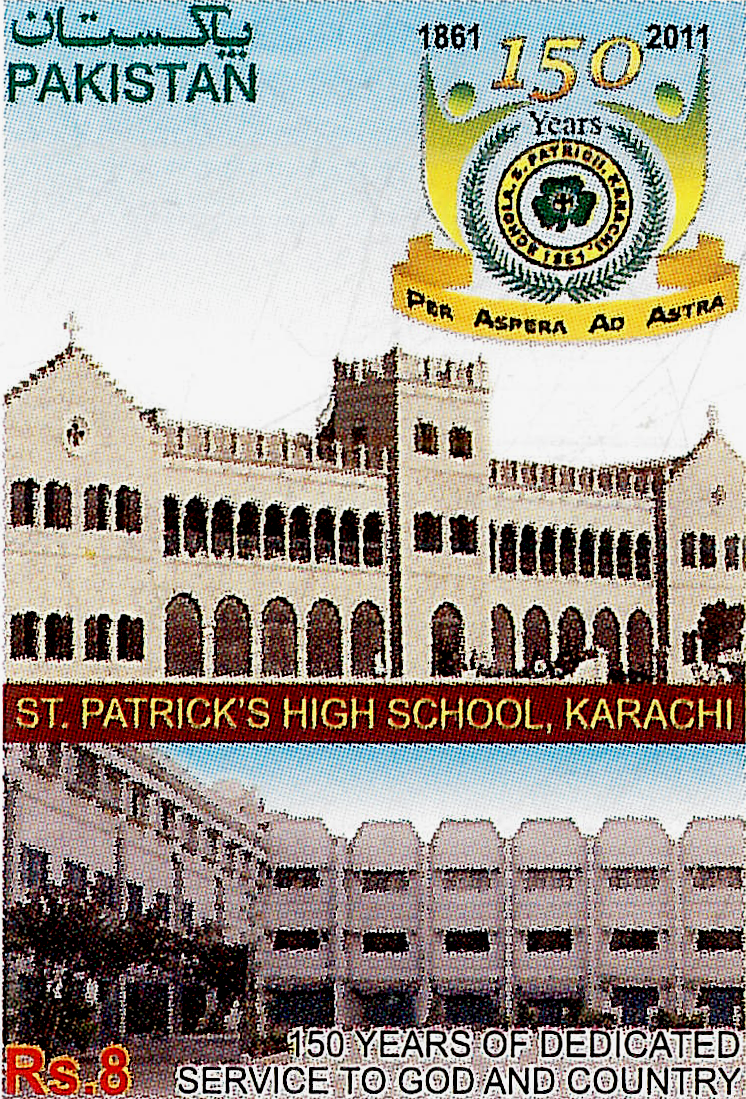
Postage Stamp for St. Patrick's High School

To commemorate the 150 years of the school, Pakistan Post office issued a special postage stamp in the year 2011.

== Notable teachers ==
- Patrick Mendes – Olympic hockey player; teacher for over 50 years
- Jacob Harris
- O. B. Nazareth
- Liberius Pieterse – translator of the Bible into Urdu
- Joseph Cordeiro – first Cardinal of Pakistan
- Katie Gomes, awarded Pro Ecclesia et Pontifice Medal for 50 Years of Service in Catholic Education.
- Fr J B Todd
- Norma Fernandes – recipient, Tamgha-i-Imtiaz for 50 years of service to education
- James deSouza – priest for over 50 years
- Anthony Theodore Lobo – former Bishop of Islamabad-Rawalpindi
- Joseph Paul – principal
- Yolande Henderson – former section head of the O' Levels Section
- Hilda Pereira, teacher for nearly 50 years
- Saifullah Sabir – Mathematics teacher for Upper O' Levels Section
- Ambrose Dean - Art and Drawing Teacher for 59 years

== Notable alumni ==
=== Politicians ===
- Lal Krishna Advani – former Deputy Prime Minister of India; co-founder, Bharatiya Janata Party in India
- Shaukat Aziz – former Prime Minister of Pakistan
- Nabil Gabol – Federal Minister and politician
- Manuel Misquita – former Mayor of Karachi
- Asif Ali Zardari – former President of Pakistan; co-chairman, of Pakistan Peoples Party
- Muhammad Khan Junejo – former Prime Minister of Pakistan
- Muhammad Ayub Khuhro – Chief Minister of Sindh
- Yusuf Haroon – former Chief Minister of Sindh
- Jam Sadiq Ali – former Chief Minister of Sindh
- Pir Mazhar Ul Haq – senior minister of education
- Khurshid Mahmud Kasuri – Foreign Minister of Pakistan from 2002 to 2007
- Pervez Musharraf – former President of Pakistan, founder of All Pakistan Muslim League
- Syed Murad Ali Shah – Chief Minister of Sindh (since 2016)

=== Academics and researchers ===
- Prof. Adil Najam – international relations, environment and diplomacy scholar
- Eng. Izhar Haider – founder, Shiekh Khalifa Bin Zayed Arab Pakistani School, Abu Dhabi
- Dr Adil Haider – trauma surgeon and outcomes research scientist in the United States
- Prof. Haroon Ahmed – Professor of Micro-electronics, University of Cambridge and former Master Corpus Christi College, Cambridge.

=== Military ===
- Pervez Musharraf – former Chief of Army Staff; President of Pakistan
- Rashid Minhas – Nishan-i-Haider recipient
- Azim Daudpota – former Governor of Sindh; former managing director, Pakistan International Airlines
- Jehangir Karamat – former Chief of Army Staff
- Farooq Feroze Khan – former Chief of Air Staff
- Brigadier Mervyn Cardoza – Tamgha-e-Khidmat recipient

=== Sportsmen ===
- John Permal – fastest human in Pakistan (1964 to 1974)
- Michael Rodrigues – five-time national table tennis champion

Hockey

- Peter Paul Fernandes – 1936 Olympic hockey gold medallist
- Patrick Mendes – Olympic hockey player; teacher for over 50 years

Cricket

- Wallis Mathias – Test cricketer
- Danish Kaneria – Test cricketer
- Javed Miandad – Test cricketer
- Reagan Patrick – Test cricketer
- Zain Ali – Test cricketer
- Antao D'Souza – Test cricketer, made his debut against West Indies in 1959 at Karachi
- Wasim Bari – Test cricketer
- Faisal Iqbal – Test cricketer

=== Judiciary ===
- Wajihuddin Ahmed – Chief Justice of the Sindh High Court
- Justice Ajmal Mian – former Chief Justice of Pakistan

=== Civil service ===
- Irfan Husain - newspaper columnist and former civil servant.
- Usama Mashkoor - M.B.B.S Doctor and current civil servant.
- Ahmed Sadik - Principal Secretary to Prime Minister Benazir Bhutto
- Aneel Khan - Former Network Engineer at Ministry of Information and Broadcasting(Civil Servant).

=== Clergy ===
- Cardinal Valerian Gracias† – former archbishop of Bombay and first Asian cardinal
- Cardinal Joseph Cordeiro† – First Cardinal of Pakistan
- Simeon Anthony Pereira† – Archbishop of Karachi (1994–2002)
- Anthony Theodore Lobo† – Bishop emeritus of the Roman Catholic Diocese of Islamabad-Rawalpindi
- Bonaventure Patrick Paul OFM† - Bishop of Hyderabad, Pakistan.
- Armando Trindade† - Archbishop of Lahore (1975-2001)
- James deSouza† - Catholic priest, teacher, school principal and humanitarian.
- Robert D'Silva† - Catholic priest 1952-2015
- Benny Mario Travas - Archbishop-elect of Karachi

=== Businessmen ===
- Cincinnatus Fabian D'Abreo, founder of Cincinnatus Town
- Sikandar Sultan – managing director, Shan Food Industries

=== Educationists ===
- Father Stephen Raymond
- Dr Asif Farrukhi – writer, editor, translator, and a physician by training; died on 1 June 2020

=== Other ===
- Khadim Hussain Baloch, cricket observer, author, and memorabilia collector
- O. B. Nazareth
- Ishaq Ibrahim
- Muhammad Mashood Siddiqui - Philanthropist & Entrepreneur
- Sir Riaz Headmaster Iqra Huffaz Boys Secondary School Mauripur

== See also ==
- Catholic Church in Pakistan
- Education in Karachi
- List of schools in Karachi
- List of Jesuit schools
