= Kallar Kahar school bus accident =

Bus accident in Kallar Kahar, Punjab, Pakistan

Details
- Date: 27 September 2011
- Location: Kallar Kahar, Chakwal District, Punjab, Pakistan

Statistics
- Bus: School bus
- Passengers: 100+
- Deaths: 37
- Injured: ~70

The Kallar Kahar school bus accident was a school bus road accident that occurred on 27 September 2011 near the town of Kallar Kahar in the Chakwal District of Punjab, Pakistan. Thirty-seven people, mostly school students, were killed in the disaster.

== Bus ==
A police spokesman for National Highways and Motorways disclosed that the bus was an old model, driven by an inexperienced driver who had never reportedly previously travelled on highways. He also acknowledged that there may have been a failure on part of the motorway authorities in properly checking the overloaded bus and remarked that an investigation was being conducted. The 1981 model bus was reconditioned in 2002 and had been given a road-worthiness certificate by the vehicle examination authorities until late December 2011.

== Accident ==
The accident involved a school bus carrying students of the Millat Grammar School (located in Millat Town, Faisalabad) who were returning to the city after a school excursion and picnic at Islamabad and Murre via Kallar Kahar and the Khewra Salt Mines (also part of the school trip). While travelling along the M-2 motorway, the bus skidded due to mechanical brake failure and fell into a ravine.

It has been reported that although the bus had a capacity for only 70 passengers it was carrying at least 110 people. Reports suggest the overloaded capacity of the bus may have caused the driver to lose full control of the vehicle and subsequently experience a brake failure. The driver apparently informed the teachers first when the brakes began to fail. The information spread panic and one teacher jumped and landed out of the bus. The vice-principal advised passengers on the bus to remain calm and be prepared to jump out. However, the bus overturned before the passengers could move. According to one student who survived the accident, most of the children were looking towards the teacher who was lying on the road when the bus overturned. The children who were standing while the bus crashed experienced the heaviest casualties.

News correspondents reported that the bus was travelling on one of the steepest parts of the motorway. Pakistan has one of the worst records in traffic accidents and conduct, blamed on poor road infrastructure and faulty vehicles.

== Victims ==
As many as 37 people died in the disaster and at least 70 were critically injured. According to media sources, the dead civilians included thirty schoolchildren, the bus driver, six school teachers and the vice-principal of the school. The students were in grades six, seven, eight, nine and ten.

== Aftermath ==
Those who were injured in the incident were immediately escorted to the district headquarters hospital in Chakwal. The deadly incident immediately received national media coverage in the wake of the high casualties resulting from it. Most of the city remained closed after the district administration and authorities of Faisalabad District announced a day off for all schools, institutions and government jobs following the accident.

Concerns and questions were raised as to how an old and unfit bus was still allowed to be operational on the road and how the bus was allowed to be illegally overloaded in excess to its maximum passenger capacity. A large number of families and relatives of the affected victims soon gathered outside the school after listening to the news. Some angry and infuriated people threw stones at district government officials and local parliamentarians who visited the school.

It has been reported that the bus had no permit for the Islamabad route on which it was travelling; a transport spokesman said it was mandatory for vehicles to have a permit for the motorway route. Sources said the motorway police had not bothered to take notice of the overloaded bus or check its documents and that the bus had entered from a small interchange where there was no staff deployment and vehicles were not checked. One motorway photographer had reportedly stopped the bus at Kallar Kahar, but allowed it to proceed after the insistence of schoolchildren present in the bus. The official was later suspended.

== Investigation and controversy ==
The federal Minister of Communications Arbab Alamgir Khan called up a three-member committee to determine and investigate the causes of the bus accident. The Chief Minister of Punjab Shahbaz Sharif also ordered an inquiry to be conducted.

Investigators probing the accident have called for the cancellation of the school from the education registration department and have recommended a criminal case to be filed against the school administration for negligence by hiring a substandard bus.
