= Samson Simon Sharaf =

Pakistani army officer and political economist

- Born: Rawalpindi, Pakistan
- Military career
- Allegiance: Pakistan
- Branch: Pakistan Army
- Service years: 1972–2005
- Rank: Brigadier General
- Unit: 6/8 Punab, 13 Baloch, First Sindh, 25 Sindh
- Commands: 25th Sindh Infantry Regiment; Military Operation, Doctrines and Evaluation
- Conflicts: Kargil; 2001–2002 India–Pakistan standoff
- Awards: Sitara-i-Imtiaz (Military)

Samson Simon Sharaf is a retired officer in the Pakistan Army and a political economist. He served in Pakistan's Army for 33 years, most notably in Nuclear Policy making. Despite being qualified in security and nuclear strategy, he prefers to call himself a political economist: the role of a modern strategist.

In 2007, he became a columnist in national and international media. He also established his water treatment business on lines of Corporate Social Responsibility in cooperation with Nestle Pakistan. Most significant is removal of arsenic from drinking water in cooperation with his partners GEH Wasserchemie Germany.

As a social service, he serves as a full-time Rector of St. Mary's College Rawalpindi.

Since retirement he became an active member of Pakistan Tehreek-e-Insaf and served in Shadow Cabinet as the Spokesperson for Defense Production, Adviser to Chairman Imran Khan, member of Constitution Committee and deputy chairman of the party's Election Commission. The Election Commission since defunct was a state of the art computerized system connecting to each party member at grass roots.

He is a Christian by faith.

== Education ==
Holy Cross School Dhaka, Presentation Convent High School, Murree, St Josephs Lahore and St. Anthony's High School (Lahore) from where he did his Senior Cambridge in 1971. He completed F.Sc. from Government College Lahore in 1972. He joined the Pakistan Military Academy from where he graduated in 1974. In 1985, he obtained an honours degree in Security Studies from the University of Balochistan. He also attended Quaid-i-Azam University, Islamabad, from where he obtained a double M.Sc. in Defence and Strategic studies in 1997. His dissertation was entitled Significance of Kautilya in Strategic Thought with special Reference to India.

== Military career ==
He rose through the ranks of the Pakistan Army ending up as a Brigadier. He served as a military instructor in School of Infantry and Tactics and Pakistan Military Academy. He got his military training from L'Ecole Application de l'Infantrie France. In 1999, he also represented Pakistan in Pacific Armies Military Seminar. He commanded a newly raised infantry battalion 25 Sindh. He has served in the General Staff Branch of General Headquarters (GHQ) of the Pakistan Army. In 2005, the President of Pakistan conferred awards on Independence Day to the officers of the armed forces in Rawalpindi. Sharaf was awarded the Sitara-i-Imtiaz (Military). He has also been an honorary Colonel of the Battalion of 1st Sindh Regiment and 25 Sindh Regiment.

== Current activities ==
As a columnist Sharaf has written nearly one thousand opinions for 'The Nation' 92 News and other newspapers.

He is also a defence analyst, specialising in South Asia, Nuclear and International Political Economy. He is also currently the Rector of St Mary's College, Rawalpindi. He is also Chief Operating Officer of EcoTech Systems International Pakistan. This is a water treatment company specialising in ecological technologies and removal of Arsenic and other contamination from drinking water. Major clients include Nestle Pakistan and KSB Pakistan. Operations also extend to Bangladesh and ASEAN.

In school life Sharaf took boxing and long-distance running as sports. His appetite for endurance motivated him into trekking and high altitude climbing. In 1982 he was part of the Swiss French Mountaineering Expedition that summited Gashebrum 1, Hidden Peak 8068 M in the Korakoram Range Pakistan. Sylvain Saudain, skied from the summit to base camp. He has also trekked the entire perimeter of Pakistan on cross country vehicles, camels and on foot. In 2005, he criss-crossed the entire Nara Desert of Pakistan. He calls himself a freckled soldier, just an age older. A drifter and powinda in search of a country he loves.
