= Daughters of the Holy Heart of Mary =

Catholic female religious congregation

The Daughters of the Holy Heart of Mary (French: Filles du Saint-Cœur de Marie) is a Roman Catholic religious institute, founded in Senegal on May 24, 1858 by Aloyse Kobès. It was the first indigenous religious institute in Africa.

Kobès became the first Vicar Apostolic of Senegambia. The first nuns were Thérèse Sagna and Louise de Saint-Jean, the first African nuns outside Ethiopia.
