= Victor Gnanapragasam =

Pakistani Catholic bishop (1940–2020)

His Grace Victor Gnanapragasam
- Apostolic Vicar of Quetta
- Church: Roman Catholic Church
- See: Apostolic Vicariate of Quetta
- In office: 2010 - 2020
- Successor: Khalid Rehmat OFM (Cap.)
- Previous post: Apostolic Prefect

Orders
- Ordination: 21 December 1966
- Consecration: 16 July 2010 by Adolfo Tito Yllana
- Rank: Bishop

Personal details
- Born: November 21, 1940 Jaffna, Sri Lanka
- Died: December 12, 2020 (aged 80)

Victor Gnanapragasam O.M.I. (21 November 1940 – 12 December 2020) was a Roman Catholic prelate, who served as the first prefect of the Catholic Apostolic Prefecture of Quetta, Balochistan, Pakistan.

== Early life and education ==
He was born in Jaffna, Sri Lanka to Sri Lankan Tamil family. He completed his novitiate with the Missionary Oblates of Mary Immaculate in Kaluthara (1959), then the studies of philosophy and theology at Our Lady of Sri Lanka Seminary in Kandy (1960–1966).

== Priesthood ==
He took his final vows and was ordained a priest on December 21, 1966. He has served in Pakistan as a priest since 1973 and is a member of the Oblates of Mary Immaculate, Pakistan.

He has been a parish priest in Gojra, Diocese of Faisalabad, from 1976-77. He attended a training course in Youth Ministry in Manila, Philippines from 1977-1979. He was parish priest in Toba Tek Singh, Diocese of Faisalabad from 1978-1980. He was parish priest at Khanewal, Diocese of Multan, from 1979–1985; Superior of the OMI Delegation in Pakistan, 1980–1982 and again parish priest in Gojra from 1982-1986. He was once again parish priest in Toba Tek Singh from 1987–1989; undertook studies in Psychology and Spirituality at St. Anselm Institute in Kent, England and then later courses in Spirituality at the Angelicum, Rome, 1989-1992. He was parish priest in Gojra for a third time from 1992–1993; Assistant in the formation house of the Oblates in Karachi, 1993–1997 and First Counselor of the OMI Delegation in Pakistan from 1997-2001.

He was appointed to the post of Apostolic Prefect Of Quetta in December 2001.

Fr. Victor was also at the Vatican for the Ad limina Apostolorum visit of the Pakistani Bishops in June 2008.

On 29 April 2010 Pope Benedict XVI elevated the apostolic prefecture of Quetta, to the rank of Apostolic vicariate, with the same name and territorial configuration as before. He appointed Fr. Victor as apostolic vicar of the new ecclesiastical circumscription and the titular bishop of Timida.

== Consecration ==
He was consecrated Bishop at Saint Patrick's Cathedral, Karachi on 16 July 2010 by the apostolic nuncio to Pakistan Archbishop Adolfo Tito Yllana. The Principal Co-Consecrators were Archbishop Evarist Pinto of Karachi and Bishop Max John Rodrigues of Hyderabad.

== Current events ==
Heightened security following unrest in Balochistan has resulted in logistical problems for Gnanapragasam in 2019. His cathedral is in the same area as the army barracks and so he requires a special pass to travel to and fro. This is further exacerbated by frequent police/army checks. The prime minister of Pakistan Imran Khan has said that his government will look into “the plight of the oppressed and weakest segments of the society, including minorities.”

== Death ==
He died on December 12, 2020, because of a heart attack. The funeral of Bishop Gnanapragasam took place at Holy Rosary Cathedral, Quetta on December 15, 2020. The funeral service was led by Cardinal Joseph Coutts accompanied by all the bishops of Pakistan. He was buried in the garden of the Cathedral.

On January 1, 2021, Pope Francis named Father Khalid Rehmat OFM (Cap.) of the Archdiocese of Lahore as the new vicar apostolic of Quetta.
