= Sangota =

Pakistani village

- Village
- Location within Pakistan
- Coordinates: 34.47°N 72.25°E
- Country: Pakistan
- Province: Khyber-Pakhtunkhwa
- District: Swat
- Elevation: 1,120 m (3,670 ft)

Population (2017)
  - Total: 14,587
- Time zone: UTC+5 (PST)

Sangota is a village in Swat District of Khyber-Pakhtunkhwa. It is located at 34°47'0N 72°25'0E with an altitude of 1120 metres (3677 feet).
