= Anthony Theodore Lobo =

Founder of SMCS

His Grace Anthony Theodore Felix Lobo انتھونی تھوڈور فیلکس لوبو
- Bishop of Roman Catholic Diocese of Islamabad-Rawalpindi (Emeritus)
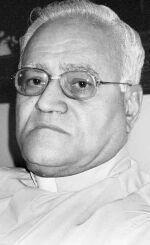
- Bishop Anthony Theodore Lobo
- Church: Roman Catholic
- See: Roman Catholic Diocese of Islamabad-Rawalpindi
- In office: 1993–2010
- Predecessor: Simeon Anthony Pereira
- Successor: Rufin Anthony
- Previous post: Auxiliary Bishop of Karachi

Orders
- Ordination: 8 January 1961

Personal details
- Born: 4 July 1937 Karachi, Sind Province, British India
- Died: 18 February 2013 (aged 75) Rawalpindi-Islamabad, Pakistan

Anthony Theodore Felix Lobo (4 July 1937 – 18 February 2013) was a Pakistani Roman Catholic bishop. On 8 June 1982 he was appointed Auxiliary Bishop of Karachi by Pope John Paul II. On 28 May 1993 he became Bishop of Islamabad–Rawalpindi.

== Biography ==
Lobo was born in Karachi, British India (now Pakistan) on 4 July 1937, to Joseph and Ermina Lobo, Catholics of Goan origin. He received his early education at Saint Patrick's High School and his religious training at the Christ the King seminary in Karachi, and was ordained a priest in Karachi on 8 January 1961. He also had degrees from the University of Karachi, Harvard and Paris.

Bishop Lobo made important contributions to education in the country. He was Principal of St. Lawrence's Boys School, Karachi and later of Saint Patrick's High School, Karachi. In November 1986 he founded St. Michael's Convent School. He was the author of many books on education. In recognition of his services to the cause of literature and education, the President of Pakistan conferred on him the Presidential Pride of Performance Award in 1990.

In his efforts to bring improvements in the Pakistani education system, he sought assistance from Australia to create the Notre Dame Institute of Education in Karachi in 1991.

Bishop Lobo also served in the following positions:

- Chairman, Education Commission of Pakistan.
- Secretary General, Catholic Bishop Conference of Pakistan.
- Chairman, Office of Education, Federation of Asian Bishop's Conference.
- Member of Senate, Shah Abdul Latif University, Khairpur.
- Member of Senate, Sindh University, Jamshoro.
- Member of the board for Oasis magazine, Cairo, Egypt. The magazine focuses on the need for interreligious dialogue and peace.
- Spiritual Director of the St. Vincent's Home for the Aged, Karachi.

On 18 February 2010, Bishop Lobo resigned as Bishop of Islamabad-Rawalpindi due to ill health and was automatically succeeded by Bishop Rufin Anthony.

Bishop Lobo died on the morning of 18 February 2013 at Rawalpindi-Islamabad. He was buried in the compound of St. Joseph's Cathedral, Rawalpindi. The Express Tribune asked Yolande Henderson, a former headmistress of St Patrick's to write a tribute to the late Bishop Lobo.
