= Catholic Board of Education, Pakistan =

The Catholic Board of Education is the arm of the Roman Catholic Church in Pakistan responsible for education. Each diocese has its own board. Collectively the Catholic Church runs 534 schools, 8 colleges, and 7 technical institutes in its 2 archdioceses, 4 dioceses, and one Apostolic Prefecture.

The Government of Pakistan nationalised most church schools and colleges in Punjab and Sindh in 1972. Elite schools such as St Patrick's High School, Karachi, St Joseph's Convent School (Karachi) and St Michael's Convent School Lahore were never nationalised.

The Government of Sindh oversaw a denationalisation programme from 1985 to 1995, and the Government of Punjab began a similar program in 1996. In 2001, the Federal Government and the courts ordered the provincial governments to complete the denationalisation process. In May 2005, the Sindh Government announced its intention to handover St. Patrick's and St. Joseph's colleges to the Catholic Board of Education.

== Karachi ==
The Society of the Daughters of the Holy Heart of Mary came to Karachi in 1954. One of them, Mother Doyle, an American educationalist, was instrumental in establishing the Catholic Board of Education. The Catholic Board of Education in Karachi was established in 1961 to "maintain and manage all present and future educational institutions belonging to the Roman Catholic Archdiocese of Karachi." The Archbishop of Karachi appoints the board and is also the ex officio chairman of the board.

The board is registered with the government under Societies Registration Act 1860. In 2004 the Catholic Board of Education maintains and manages 56 primary, secondary and high schools (18 English medium and 38 Urdu medium) for boys and girls which are attended by around 50,000 students.

== Islamabad-Rawalpindi ==
The Diocesan Board of Education Islamabad / Rawalpindi was registered as a non-profitable and a charitable organization in 1960 under the Societies Registration Act, 1860. At that time it had 30 schools with about 18,000 students. By 2016, the Board supervised 45 schools with about 33,000 students.

A conference entitled "Education and Curriculum Policies in Pakistan: Impact On Interfaith Harmony and Peace" was organised as part of a countrywide effort by the Catholic Church to tackle the new education policy. The Jan. 11–13, 2007 conference's 30 participants included Bishop Anthony Theodore Lobo of Islamabad-Rawalpindi, chairman of the Catholic Board of Education.

== Lahore ==
The Catholic Board of Education in the Archdiocese of Lahore, runs over 140 schools, the majority of which are Urdu-medium and set up in the remote areas of the city. Over 30,000 children receive a cheap but high quality education, regardless of caste, colour or creed.

The education department of Punjab announced on July 28, 1996, that it planned to denationalize schools in the province. There are 43 Catholic schools among them in four dioceses: 17 in Lahore, 11 in Faisalabad, eight in Islamabad-Rawalpindi and seven in Multan.

The Lahore archdiocese's Catholic Board of Education, announced that, starting in April 2007, Catholic educational institutions would offer career-guidance programs for grades 6–10. Archbishop Lawrence Saldanha of Lahore, is the CBE chairman. Catholic educational services go back to 1856, when the first Catholic school was opened by Jesus and Mary Sisters in Sialkot.

On April 23, 2009, at a gala awards ceremony organized by Lahore archdiocese's Catholic Board of Education (CBE) at St. Anthony's College in Lahore. Imran Masood, Minister of Education for Punjab province, congratulated the Catholic Board of Education for many years of outstanding services. He appealed for more Catholic contributions in the future, urging, the CBE to open colleges and universities. He assured the grant of a charter of recognition. He presented awards to more than 100 long-serving teachers and support staff members in recognition of the more than 25 years of meritorious service each has given to schools belonging to Lahore archdiocese.

The Catholic Board of Education is trying to provide teachers with better in-service training as one way to improve the quality of education.

== Faisalabad ==
In October 2019, the Catholic Board of Education organised a preparatory course to help Catholics enter the civil service. 35 men and women attended the course held at the CBE Hall.

== Multan ==
The Catholic Board of Education, Multan, currently manages 27 schools which provide education to thousands. In a December 12, 2022 interview Bishop-elect Yousaf Sohan outlined his plans to promote education in the diocese. He plans to build more schools and enable homeless children to access education.

== Other boards ==
- Catholic Board of Education, Hyderabad
- Catholic Board of Education, Quetta

== See also ==
- List of educational boards in Pakistan
