= Holy Rosary Church =

Holy Rosary Church or Holy Rosary Catholic Church may refer to:

== Asia ==
- Holy Rosary Parish Church (Angeles City), Philippines
- Holy Rosary Church, Dhaka, Bangladesh
- Holy Rosary Church, Quetta, Pakistan
- Church of Our Lady of the Rosary (Doha), Qatar
- Holy Rosary Church, Bangkok, Thailand
- Our Lady of the Rosary Church, Averipalli, Tamil Nadu India

== Europe ==
- Our Lady of the Rosary Church, Saint Peter Port, Guernsey
- Holy Rosary Church, Murroe, County Limerick, Ireland

== North America ==
=== Canada ===
- Holy Rosary Church, Guelph
- Holy Rosary Church (Toronto)
- Water's Edge Event Centre in Windsor, Ontario

=== United States ===
- Holy Rosary Church (Bridgeport, Connecticut)
- Holy Rosary Church (Idaho Falls, Idaho), listed on the National Register of Historic Places (NRHP)
- Holy Rosary Church (Manton, Kentucky), near Springfield, Kentucky, NRHP-listed
- Holy Rosary Church (Baltimore, Maryland)
- Holy Rosary Church (Rochester, New York), NRHP-listed
- Our Lady of the Rosary Church (Detroit)
- Holy Rosary Church, Bozeman, Montana, whose Holy Rosary Church Rectory is NRHP-listed
- Holy Rosary Church (Manhattan), New York City
- Our Lady of the Holy Rosary Church (New York City)
- Holy Rosary Church (Cleveland, Ohio), NRHP-listed
- Holy Rosary Catholic Church (St. Marys, Ohio), NRHP-listed
- Holy Rosary Church (Kranzburg, South Dakota), NRHP-listed in Codington County, South Dakota
- Holy Rosary Church (Tacoma, Washington)
- Our Lady of the Holy Rosary Church, Yauco, Puerto Rico

=== Caribbean ===
- Holy Rosary Church, Saba

== See also ==
- Holy Rosary Cathedral (disambiguation)
- Holy Rosary Parish (disambiguation)
- Holy Rosary Historic District, Kansas City, Missouri, NRHP-listed
- Holy Rosary-Danish Church Historic District, Indianapolis, Indiana, NRHP-listed
