= Holy Rosary Parish =

Holy Rosary Parish may refer to:

- Holy Rosary Parish, Angeles
- Holy Rosary Parish, Hadley
- Holy Rosary Parish Billingham
- Holy Rosary parish, Warispura

== See also ==
- Holy Rosary Church (disambiguation)
