= Holy Rosary =

Holy Rosary may refer to:

- Rosary, a set of prayer beads used in a traditional Roman Catholic devotion
- The Holy Rosary, a prayer based on the rosary

== See also ==
- Holy Rosary Academy (disambiguation), one of several Roman Catholic schools with this name
- Holy Rosary Cathedral (disambiguation), one of several Roman Catholic cathedrals with this name
- Holy Rosary Church (disambiguation)
