= Holy Rosary parish, Warispura =

Holy Rosary Church
- Location: Warispura, Punjab
- Country: Pakistan
- Language: Urdu
- Denomination: Roman Catholic
- Tradition: Latin

History
- Founded: May 1967
- Founder: Bishop Benedict Cialeo OP

Administration
- Diocese: Diocese of Faisalabad
- Parish: Holy Rosary parish

Clergy
- Bishop: Joseph Indrias Rehmat

Holy Rosary parish is a church of the Roman Catholic Diocese of Faisalabad, in Warispura, Pakistan.

In May 1967, Bishop Benedict Cialeo OP of Lyallpur Diocese established the first parish in Warispura and appointed Fr. Louis Pinto as Parish Priest. In 2010 it was administered by the Dominican fathers with Fr. Iftkhar Moon OP as the Parish Priest.

It is a large and active parish with different groups participating in parish activities, Along with the city areas with 1969 families, the parish serves a large rural area as well with around 800 families. There are St. Vincent de Paul conferences in different parts of the parish. Holy Rosary Parish is developing rapidly with churches being built in Chak 242 Dausuha, Malkhanwala, and Ibn-E-Mariam Colony. Land in Khushhall town was bought for the Church with the financial help of Bishop Joseph Coutts.

In 2011 the parish had about 6,000 Catholics, most of them working as casual workers.

From 2015 till 2019, Fr Younas Shahzad was the parish priest.

== Mass Centre ==
On November 23, 2011 St. Albert's Church, in Julius Salik Town in the parish became the most recent Mass Centre.

== Religious Congregations ==
Other religious congregations in the parish include the Medical Mission Sisters, Missionaries of Charity, Marist Brothers, the Dominican Sisters and the Sisters of Loretto.

== Rosary Ministry ==
The Universal Living Rosary Association of St. Philomena USA (ULRA) working for the promotion of devotion to our Holy Mother and the Rosary in Pakistan is also located in Warispura Parish. Rosaries, Medals, Scapulars, Holy Oil, St. Philomena Cord and other printed material are given free of cost. A three monthly newsletter is also published by ULRA Pakistan. Afzaal Anwar Khokhar is the ULRA representative for Pakistan. The head office in Pakistan is in Barkatpura, Faisalabad. Further details of ULRA can be viewed at http://philomena.org .

== Youth ==
There are six youth groups in the Parish who actively help the Church activities to meet the challenges of the modern time. Most of the youth members are college and university students. They are encouraged to do good work for the betterment of society. The Association for Women’s Awareness and Rural Development (AWARD) is a nonprofit organisation dedicated to community development work without discrimination. In June 2018, AWARD Pakistan organised a one day seminar on Youth Development in collaboration with Holy Rosary Parish. 75 participants, mostly young people, attended the seminar.

== Jail Apostolate ==
The Parish is helping prisoners by visiting them and saying Mass for them. It tries to help some prisoners to leave their past life and start with new hope.

== Healing Ministry ==
The parish provides resources to help people in need in collaboration with St. Raphael's Hospital whose many employees are from the Parish.

In 2009 the Bishop Paul Community Center was built in Madina Town to provide free medical care for the poor. This three room clinic was built with the help of Caritas Pakistan. Twice a month, two doctors and a nurse provide free consultations and tests and provide medications.

== Schools ==
The parish administers 6 schools (middle and primary). These schools are showing improving results. There is a parish school board to assist in the work of running these schools. The La Salle High School Faisalabad also resides within the parish. The St. Joseph's Technical Institute, Faisalabad is also assisted financially.

- Ibne-e-Mariam Primary School, Malkhanwala

This was the first school of Warispura Parish. Fr. Siddique Mark Sundar was the principal of the school. A Government financial grant was approved by the local Member of Parliament Colonel W. Herbert. The school was registered in 1989. Later on, the building was expanded and 3 more rooms were built with the help of the Catholic Board of Education.

- Tabdar Middle School

Fr. John Palma OP built the building of Tabdar Middle School with the financial assistance. This school was registered in 1993.

- St. Paul Primary School, Wazirkhan

In the beginning there were open air classes without any building. With the support of Fr. John Palma and Fr. Siddique M. Sunder building started in 1992 and the school was registered in November 1992.

- Binat ul- Sehar Girls middle school, Ibne-e-Mariam Colony

Its first name was Ibne-e-Mariam middle school. This school was started under the kind guidance of Fr. Sidique Mark Sunder with only two rooms. Later on, Fr. Zafer Iqbal OP expanded the school building and it was registered up to the middle standard. This school was registered in 1999. Four rooms were added in 2007.

- Subh-e-nao Middle School, Warispura

Fr. Zafer Iqbal OP was the first principal of this school. This school was started in 1994. In the beginning the school consisted of only on three rooms. Later on nine more rooms were built. Fr. Zafer Iqbal OP introduced the computer education to familiarize the students with modern technology. He started the computer centre. There are three hundred students. The present Principal Fr. Pascal Paulus OP has built two new rooms and a hall for the school. The school now has a band too.

- St. Catherine's Girls High School, Warispura

The school has 6 Dominican sisters plus 19 teachers.

== Government Support ==
The Punjab government provided subsidized food and clothing for Christians during Christmas 2009. The government set aside more than 4 million rupees (US$47,000) for the project. Subsidized goods were provided through markets in three Catholic Church compounds in Faisalabad, including the Holy Rosary Church.

== Unrest ==
On 11 July 2010 street protests disturbed the area which is home to around 100,000 Christians. The mobs were protesting about two Protestant Christian brothers arrested on 2 July and charged with writing a booklet containing blasphemous words. The church was also battered by a hail of stones and rocks. A large number of Christians have fled Warispura fearing violence, after Islamic militants launched a protest action that started at a local mosque after Friday prayers. On 19 July the two accused brothers were shot dead outside a court in Faisalabad.

== 2010 Floods ==
In August 2010 the heaviest rains in 80 years caused the worst flooding the country has ever seen. A deacon was shot and two priests beaten for trying to prevent floodwaters from entering the church.

Muhammad Ijaz Virk, a Muslim member of the National Assembly of Pakistan, helped restore the dilapidated church structure. Built in 1985, the Church suffered heavy damage in the 2010 flooding. Prime Minister Yousaf Raza Gilani himself approved the project. Costing six million rupees (US$70,073) it includes revamping a 1,114 square meter area including the church floor, altar, altar stage and the parish house.
