= Water's Edge Event Centre =

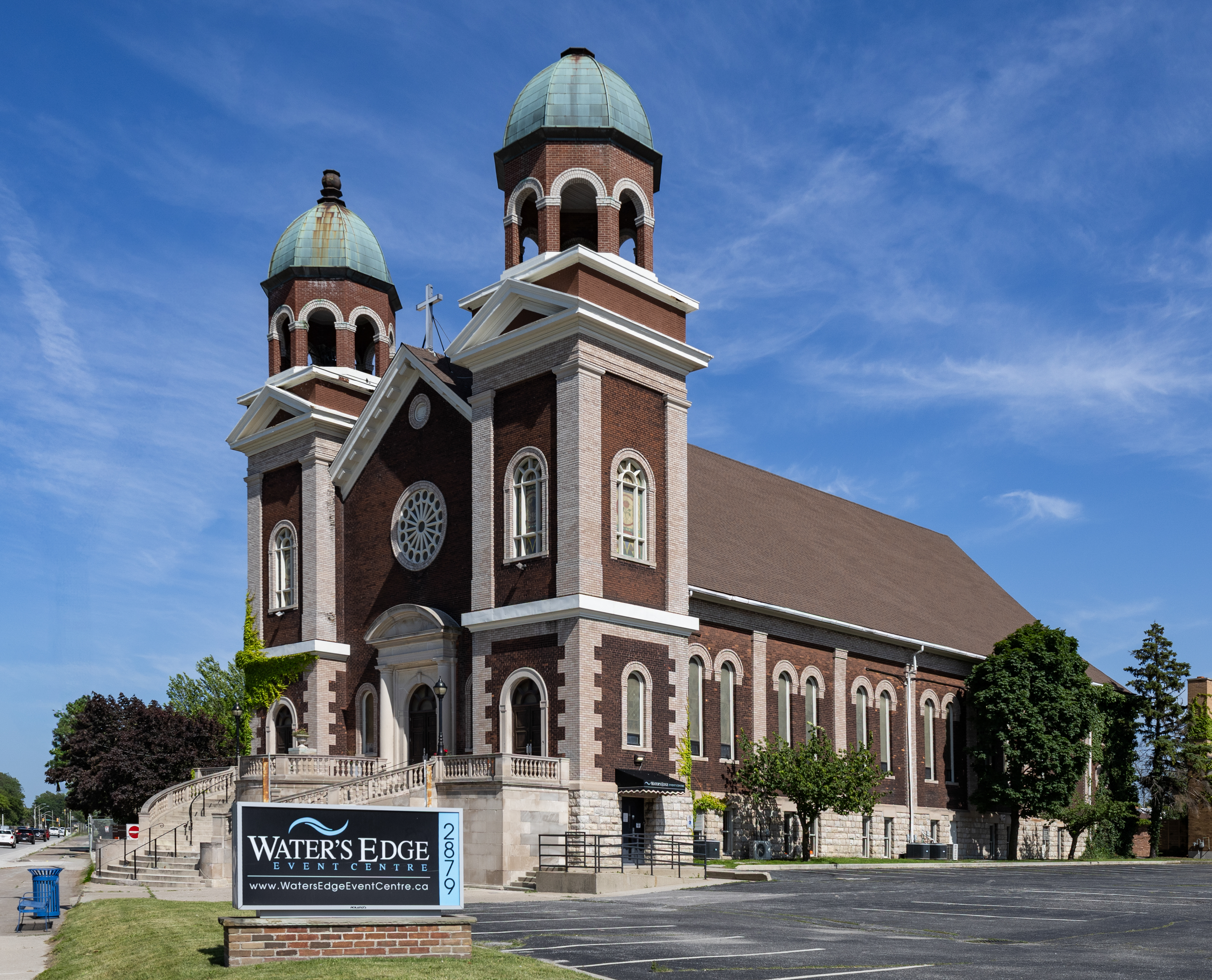
- Interactive map of the Water's Edge Event Centre area

General information
- Architectural style: Renaissance Revival
- Location: 2879 Riverside Drive East, Windsor, Ontario, Canada
- Coordinates: 42°19′34″N 83°00′09″W
- Year built: 1907
- Renovated: 2013–2015

Technical details
- Material: Red brick with white trimming

Design and construction
- Architecture firm: Williams Brothers

Website
- watersedgeeventcentre.ca

The Water's Edge Event Centre, previously Our Lady of the Rosary Church, is an event venue and former Catholic church in Windsor, Ontario, Canada. Built in 1907 as a replacement for the earlier Our Lady of the Lake Church, it was designed in the Renaissance Revival style by the Williams Brothers. The Our Lady of the Rosary parish included several daughter parishes at its peak, but the church was closed in 2007 amid rising maintenance costs and dwindling membership. The building was purchased by Larry Horwitz in 2013 and repurposed into an event venue after extensive renovations. The building is characterized by twin bell towers with copper domes that flank a circular staircase, which are prominently visible from the waterfront.

== Description ==
The Water's Edge Event Centre is located at 2879 Riverside Drive East in Windsor, Ontario. It faces the Detroit River, and is flanked to the east by Cadillac Street and to the west by Drouillard Road.

Completed in the Renaissance Revival style with Classical Revival elements, the building is a former Catholic church characterized by twin bell towers. These bell towers are spaced symmetrically at the northeastern and northwestern corners. Each is capped with a bronze dome, supported by six arched openings. These domes previously included crosses at their peaks, but these had vanished by 2008. The high bell towers made the church a waterfront landmark, allowing sailors to use it for navigation.

The façade of the Water's Edge Event Centre is further marked by a gabled entrance under a rose window, which is accessed via a Renaissance-inspired circular staircase. Two more doors, each located under a stained-glass window, provide outside access into the bell towers. The building is in red brick, with white bricks used for trimming and accents.

Inside the building, the chancel lies under a half-dome at the end of a vaulted ceiling. Supporting the ceiling, at either side of the aisle, are ionic columns. The north end of the building features a balcony, once used for an organ. The eastern and western lengths of the building are marked by six sets of stained-glass windows. The building has a capacity of 400 people.

== History ==
=== Our Lady of the Rosary ===
The first Catholic parish established at the site was the Our Lady of the Lake Church, named in reference to nearby Lake St. Clair as well as Mary, mother of Jesus. Plans were announced in 1881, aiming to provide the predominantly French settlers of Sandwich East with a closer house of worship than the previously used St. Alphonsus Church. The first church was built in 1884; designed by Claude Reaume, J.S. Viger, and William Waldman, the building was constructed by the contractors Francois Xavier Drouillard and Adolphe Labadie.

In 1907, the Our Lady of the Lake church building was destroyed in a fire caused by a spark from a passing train. With a new church required, the parish contracted the William Brothers architectural firm. The resulting building was made larger than the previous church to better serve the growing membership of the parish. The area had recently been converted by the Ford Motor Company of Canada into Ford City, a company town, and the population was growing. The parish was later renamed, becoming Our Lady of the Rosary. The building cost CA$45,000 to complete.

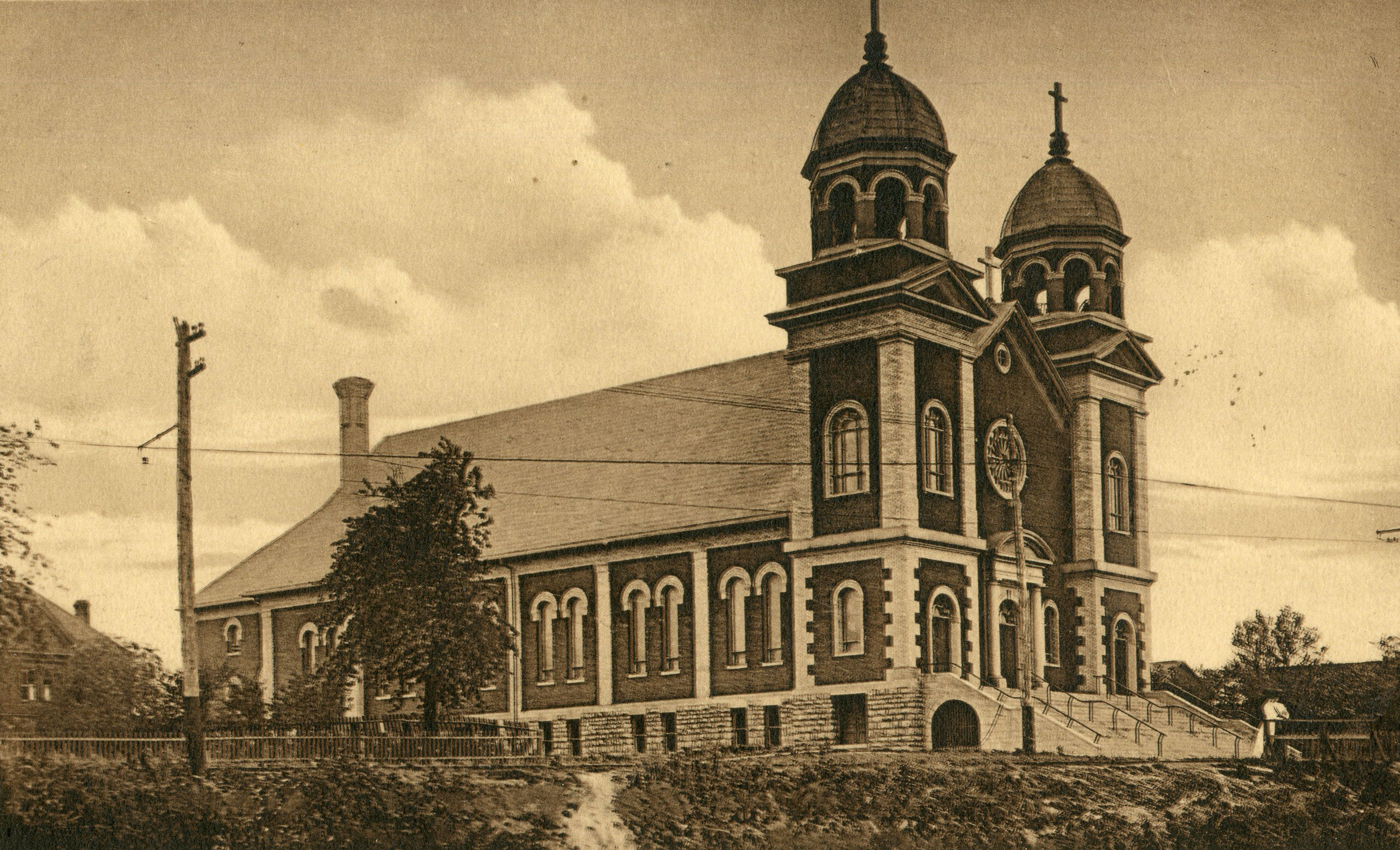
The church building, c. 1915

Our Lady of the Rosary initially prioritized French-speaking congregants, in part to counteract ongoing efforts in the education system to promote the use of English. Such language politics resulted in tension within the congregation after the appointment of Father F. X. Laurendeau to the pastorship, as it was feared that he would be unsympathetic to the needs of the French-speaking community; he had previously established an English-language parish, and was appointed by an English-speaking bishop. Some parishioners sought other congregations. Others, meanwhile, chose to block the pastor's entrance to the church. On 8 September 1917 the Ford City Riots broke out, wherein English- and French-speaking parishioners threw stones and attacked each other with rakes and shovels. The riot was broken up by police, who also escorted Laurendeau past a French blockade into the building.

Ultimately, the situation calmed, and after a year the French-speaking parishioners returned. The church began offering services in both French and English, and under Laurendeau its membership grew to include 3,000 people. Our Lady of the Rosary had several daughter parishes, including St. Anne, St. Rose de Lima, St Therese, Most Precious Blood, Sts. Cyril and Methodius, St. Joseph, St. Francis, and Our Lady of Guadalupe. In 1979, Our Lady of the Rosary established Drouillard Place – a social services programme – in conjunction with the East Windsor Citizen's Committee. Extensive renovations were conducted beginning in the 1980s, including work on the towers and the front entranceway; a CA$2 million restoration project was completed in 2002.

Membership, however, was dwindling. By 1965, Our Lady of the Rosary counted only 300 families in its congregation. In 2007, the auxiliary bishop of the Diocese of London, Ontario, announced the closure of the church; the last Mass was held on 28 October 2007. The diocese then offered the building for sale at a price of CA$1. Our Lady of the Rosary was one of three Catholic churches in Windsor–Essex County placed on the market, as the church was unable to pay for maintenance. By 2013, the building was in need of significant repairs, with much of its facade crumbling.

=== Water's Edge ===
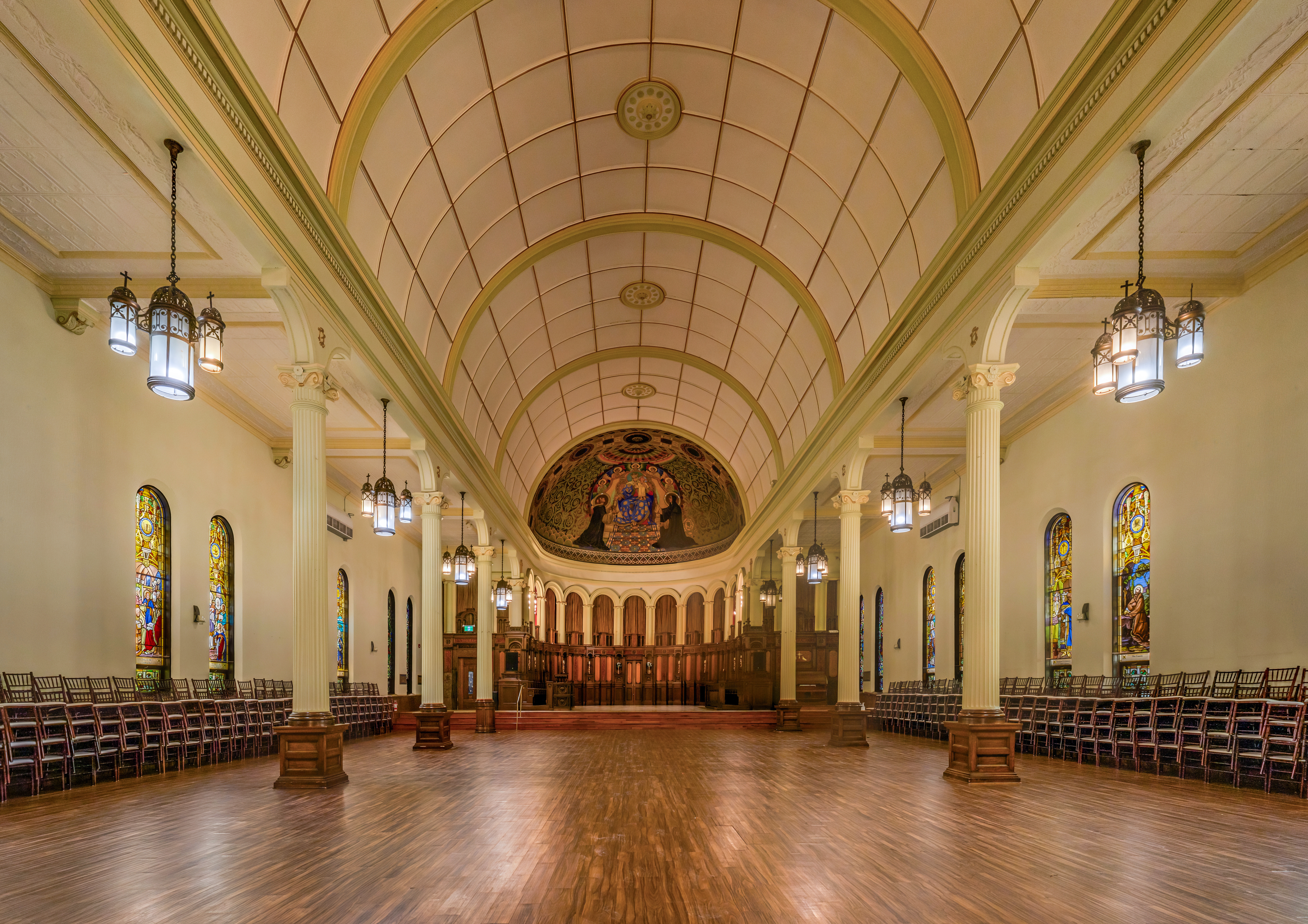
The interior of the centre.

Acquisition of the property was considered by the City of Windsor, but ultimately it declined the purchase. One staff member noted the "considerable" cost of refurbishing the building, estimated at CA$3.6 million. The city did, however, designate the building under the Ontario Heritage Act through By-Law 209-2008 in December 2008. In 2013, the building was purchased by Windsor-based entrepreneur Larry Horwitz, though he only took possession in April 2015. He decided to repurpose the building as an event venue. Speaking with The Windsor Star, Horwitz indicated that he had drawn inspiration from other repurposed churches, such as the Grand Hall at the Priory in Pittsburgh, Pennsylvania.

After two years of work, the building was reopened in May 2015 as the Water's Edge Event Centre. Much of the original architecture and furniture was retained. However, numerous changes were made. The pews were replaced with a bar, while the confession booth was transformed into a coat check. New washrooms were installed, as were a bridal room and garden courtyard. The circular staircase was refurbished to provide an attractive backdrop for wedding photographs. An area was dedicated to the history of rum-running, citing claims that Al Capone had used the church to facilitate his activities during the Prohibition era.

The Water's Edge Event Centre received a Built Heritage Award from the City of Windsor in 2017 for "good heritage stewardship", which included the installation of a new roof in 2016. In 2023, Horwitz announced plans to expand the Water's Edge Event Centre into a new complex named Distillery Place. Inspired by the Armouries in London, Ontario, the complex would include new structures including a boutique hotel, spa, convention centre, and apartments. The estimated cost of the development would be millions of dollars.

== Works cited ==
- Battagello, Dave (4 December 2013). "Landmark Riverfront Church Finds New Life". The Windsor Star.
- "By-Law Number 209-2008". City of Windsor. 1 December 2008. Archived from the original on 3 January 2023 – via Ontario Heritage Trust.
- Fortnum, Travis (4 October 2023). "Ambitious Plans for Future of Water's Edge Event Centre". CTV News. Archived from the original on 25 June 2025.
- Hill, Sharon (23 April 2015). "Revival for 107-year-old Holy Rosary Church An Historic Gem". The Windsor Star.
- "Historic Windsor Church Converted into Event Centre". CBC News. 5 May 2015. Archived from the original on 27 June 2023.
- "Larry Horwitz Offers to Buy Our Lady of the Rosary Church". CBC News. 4 October 2013. Archived from the original on 23 February 2014.
- Pianta, Mauro (8 October 2011). "The "Church in Canada"? It's on Offer, It Only Costs One Dollar". La Stampa. Archived from the original on 30 January 2020.
- Thompson, Chris (20 March 2017). "Seven City Properties Being Recognized with Built Heritage Awards". The Windsor Star.
- "Water's Edge Event Centre" (Map). Google Maps.
