= Holy Rosary Church (Tacoma, Washington) =

Coordinates: 47°14′00″N 122°26′22″W

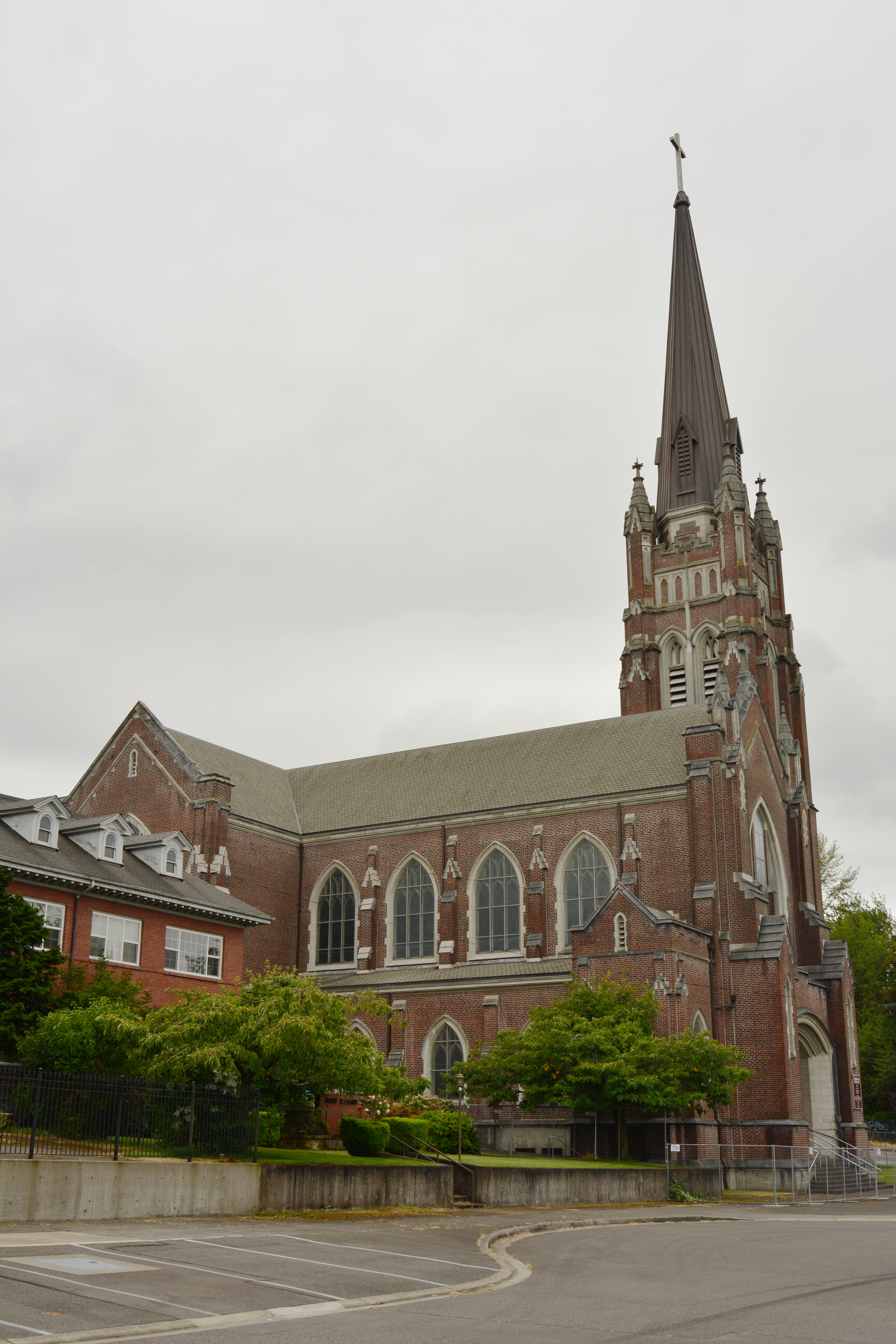
Holy Rosary Church

Our Lady of the Holy Rosary Church is a Roman Catholic church building in Tacoma, Washington, within the Archdiocese of Seattle. The church is a landmark of the city seen by travelers along Interstate 5 and has been described as Tacoma's Notre Dame.

== History ==
The parish was established in 1891 by Bishop Egidius Junger when he invited Benedictine monks from St. John's Abbey in Minnesota to serve Tacoma's German-speaking population. The parish remained under the pastorship of the Benedictine monks until 1998. The current church building was built in 1920 after the original wooden church was deemed unsafe. The church was designed by parishioner C. Frank Mahon of the Tacoma architecture firm Lundberg & Mahon.

== Demolition plans and preservation efforts ==
In 2018, the church building sustained water damage and sheetrock from the ceiling fell onto the choir loft and back pews. The building was deemed unsafe and masses were moved into the parish school auditorium. As the parish could not afford the $18 million necessary to repair the building, Archbishop J. Peter Sartain decreed in 2019 that the century-old church building be razed. The parish school moved to Fife, Washington, in 2020, as part of the parish's planned merge with St. Martin of Tours Parish. Since 2020, Holy Rosary Church has been on the Washington Trust for Historic Preservation's list of most endangered places. As the future of the parish was deemed unviable, Archbishop Paul D. Etienne ordered all services and ministries of the parish to cease at the end of August 2020.

On July 1, 2021, Holy Rosary Parish was amalgamated and merged into neighboring St. Ann Parish. One year later, St. Ann Parish was merged with Visitation Parish and St. Rita of Cascia Parish to form a new merged parish named Pope St. John XXIII Parish.

In 2024 the new parish of Pope St. John XXIII recommended to Archbishop Paul D. Etienne that the church of Our Lady of the Holy Rosary be relegated to profane but not sordid use, which means it can no longer be used for divine worship. After prayerful discernment and consultation, Archbishop Etienne agreed with the recommendation and issued a degree to relegate the building. [11] Shortly after, an individual filed a recourse against this decree. This recourse is still under review by the Vatican.
