= Holy Rosary Church Rectory (Bozeman, Montana) =

Historic house in Montana, United States

- U.S. National Register of Historic Places
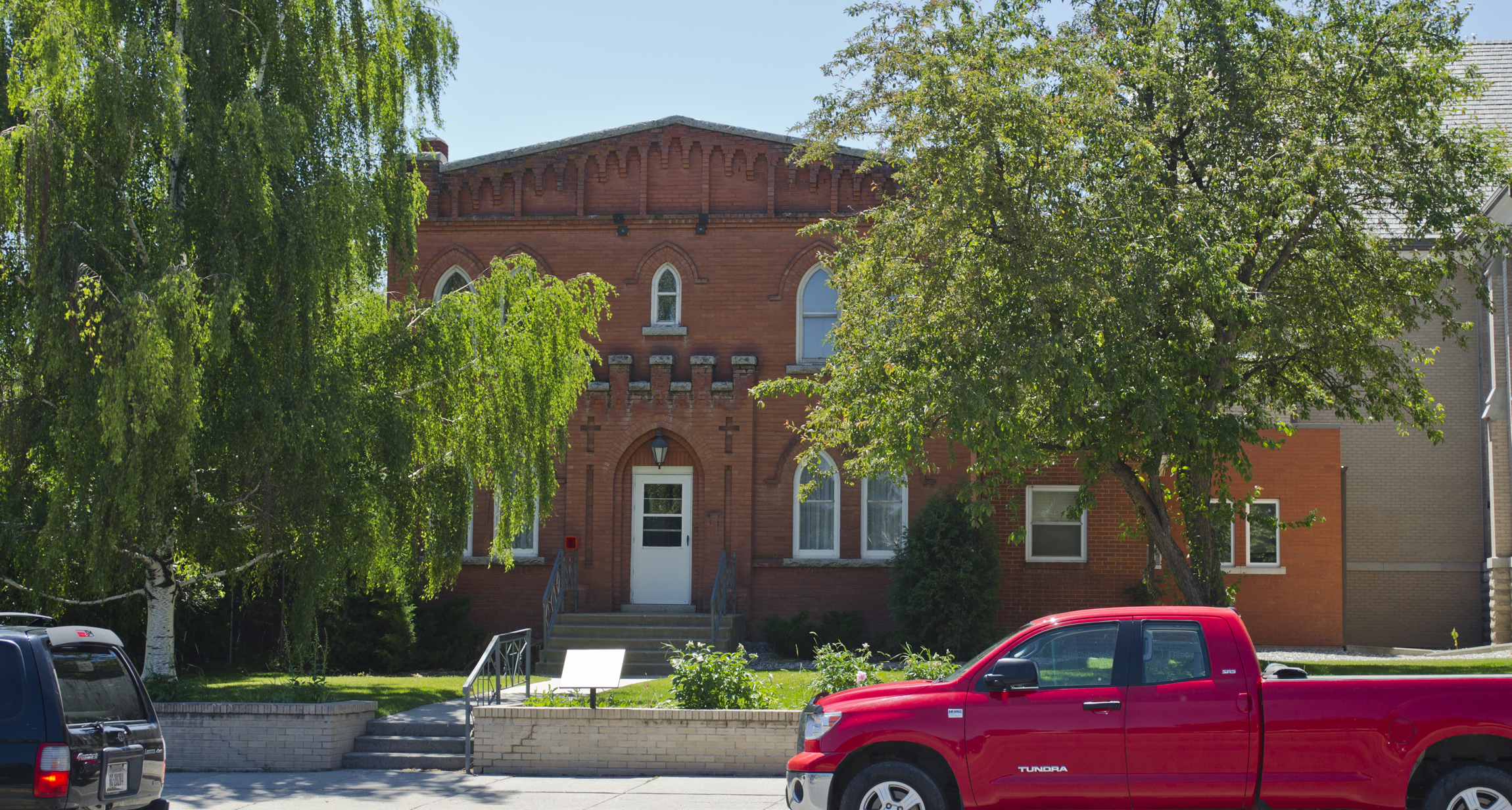

- Location within Montana Location within the United States
- Location: 220 W. Main, Bozeman, Montana
- Coordinates: 45°40′44″N 111°2′23″W
- Area: less than one acre
- Built: 1912
- Architect: Fred F. Willson
- Architectural style: Late Gothic Revival, Neo-Gothic Revival, Other
- MPS: Bozeman MRA
- NRHP reference No.: 87001801
- Added to NRHP: October 23, 1987

The Holy Rosary Church Rectory at 220 W. Main in Bozeman, Montana is a brick building that was designed by Fred F. Willson and built in 1912. It was listed on the National Register of Historic Places in 1987. The two-story brick building features Gothic arched windows and a detailed brick design along the roofline, visually linking the rectory to the church. The crenellated (notched) door surround evokes the image of a medieval castle, reinforcing the connection to the Gothic style.

== History ==
One of the early works of Fred F. Willson, the rectory is derived from 19th century architectural forms. Although individually eligible for the National Register on architecture significance, this Neo-Gothic Revival style rectory is also indicative of the growing early 20th century wealth of the Catholic Church in Bozeman. The building is a significant landmark on Main Street, especially when seen next to the Holy Rosary Church, a large Gothic Revival style church, which is non-contributing due to alteration.
