= Holy Rosary Academy =

Holy Rosary Academy may refer to:

- Holy Rosary Academy (Alaska) — Anchorage, Alaska
- Holy Rosary Academy (Hinunangan, Philippines)

== See also ==
- Rosary Academy (Fullerton, California)
