= Holy Rosary Historic District =

Historic district in Missouri, United States

- U.S. National Register of Historic Places
- U.S. Historic district
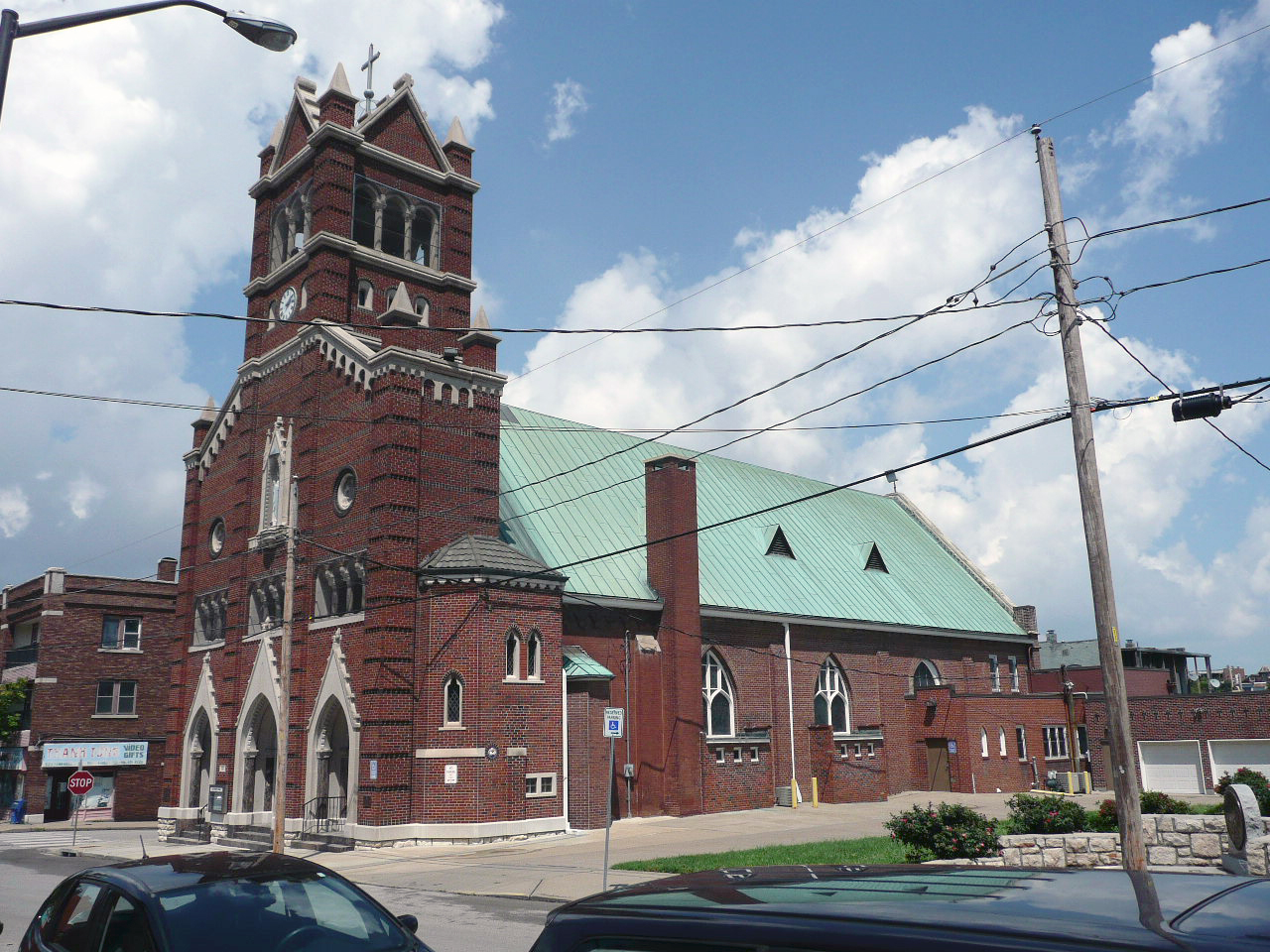

- Location within Missouri Location within the United States
- Location: Roughly bounded by 5th and Campbell, 5th and Harrison and 9th E. Missouri Ave., Kansas City, Missouri
- Coordinates: 39.10979°N 94.57262°W
- Area: 2.7 acres (1.1 ha)
- Built: 1898
- Architectural style: Early Commercial, Gothic Revival
- NRHP reference No.: 07000007
- Added to NRHP: February 7, 2007

The Holy Rosary Historic District in Kansas City, Missouri is a 2.7-acre (1.1 ha) area of the Columbus Park neighborhood centering on the Holy Rosary Church built in 1898. It was listed on the National Register of Historic Places in 2007.
