= Holy Rosary Parish Church (Angeles City) =

Roman Catholic church in Angeles, Philippines

Holy Rosary Parish
- Minor Basilica and Parish of Our Lady of the Most Holy Rosary
- Pisamban Maragul
- Basilika Menor at Parokya ng Birhen ng Santo Rosaryo (Filipino); Basilica Menor y Iglesia Parroquial de Nuestra Señora del Rosario (Spanish)
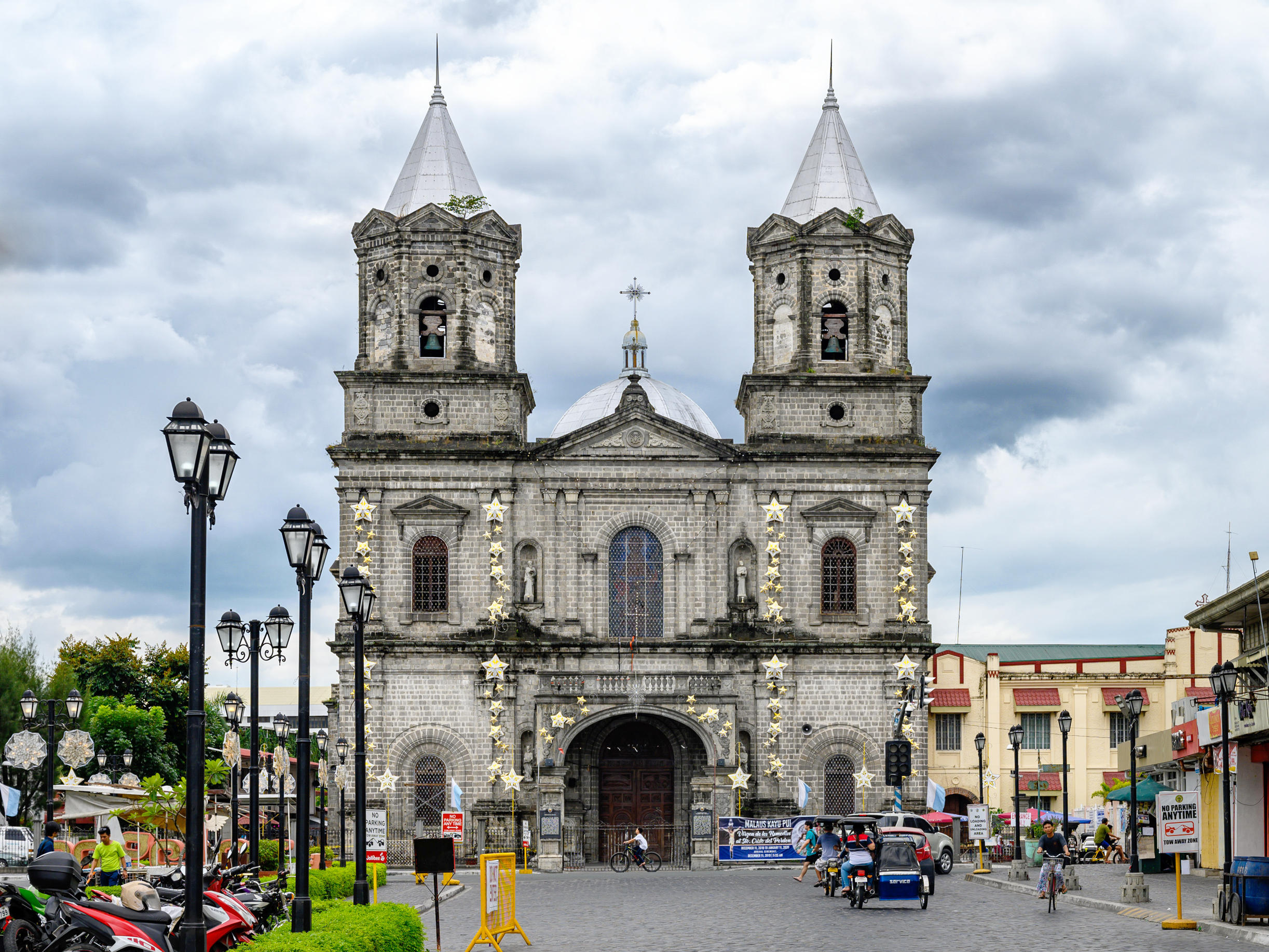
- Church facade in 2020

- Location in Luzon Location in the Philippines
- 15°08′03″N 120°35′25″E
- Location: Angeles City
- Country: Philippines
- Denomination: Roman Catholic

History
- Status: Minor basilica
- Founded: 1877; 149 years ago
- Dedication: Most Holy Virgin of the Rosary
- Dedicated: December 7, 2024; 23 months ago
- Consecrated: 1877 to 1896

Architecture
- Functional status: Active
- Architect: Antonio de la Camara
- Architectural type: Church building
- Style: Gothic Revival, Romanesque Revival, Renaissance

Administration
- Division: Region 3
- Province: Pampanga
- Archdiocese: San Fernando

Clergy
- Archbishop: Most Rev. Florentino Lavarias, D.D.
- Rector: Very Rev. Msgr. Manuel C. Sta Maria, PC
- Vicar: Rev. Fr. John Henry S. Yutuc Rev. Fr. Kavin A. Simbulan
- Priest(s): Rev. Fr. Omar Niño V. Defensor; Rev. Fr. Gian P. Sagum; Rev. Fr. Maverick Angelo M. Pelayo

The Minor Basilica of Our Lady of the Most Holy Rosary of Angeles, locally known as the Pisamban Maragul (English: "Big Church"), is a Roman Catholic Minor Basilica located in Angeles City in the Philippines. It is under the jurisdiction of the Archdiocese of San Fernando. The church is located in the former Barrio Culiat of San Fernando, Pampanga, now known as Angeles City. The shrine is dedicated to the Blessed Virgin Mary under the title of Our Lady of the Rosary.

Pope Leo XIV issued a Pontifical decree which raised the shrine to the status of minor basilica on 21 January 2026. The church building also enshrines a venerated corpse statue of Christ called Apung Mamacalulu (English: "Lord of Mercy"). The shrine is recognized by the National Commission for Culture and the Arts as a national historical site and as an important cultural property by the National Museum of the Philippines.

== History ==
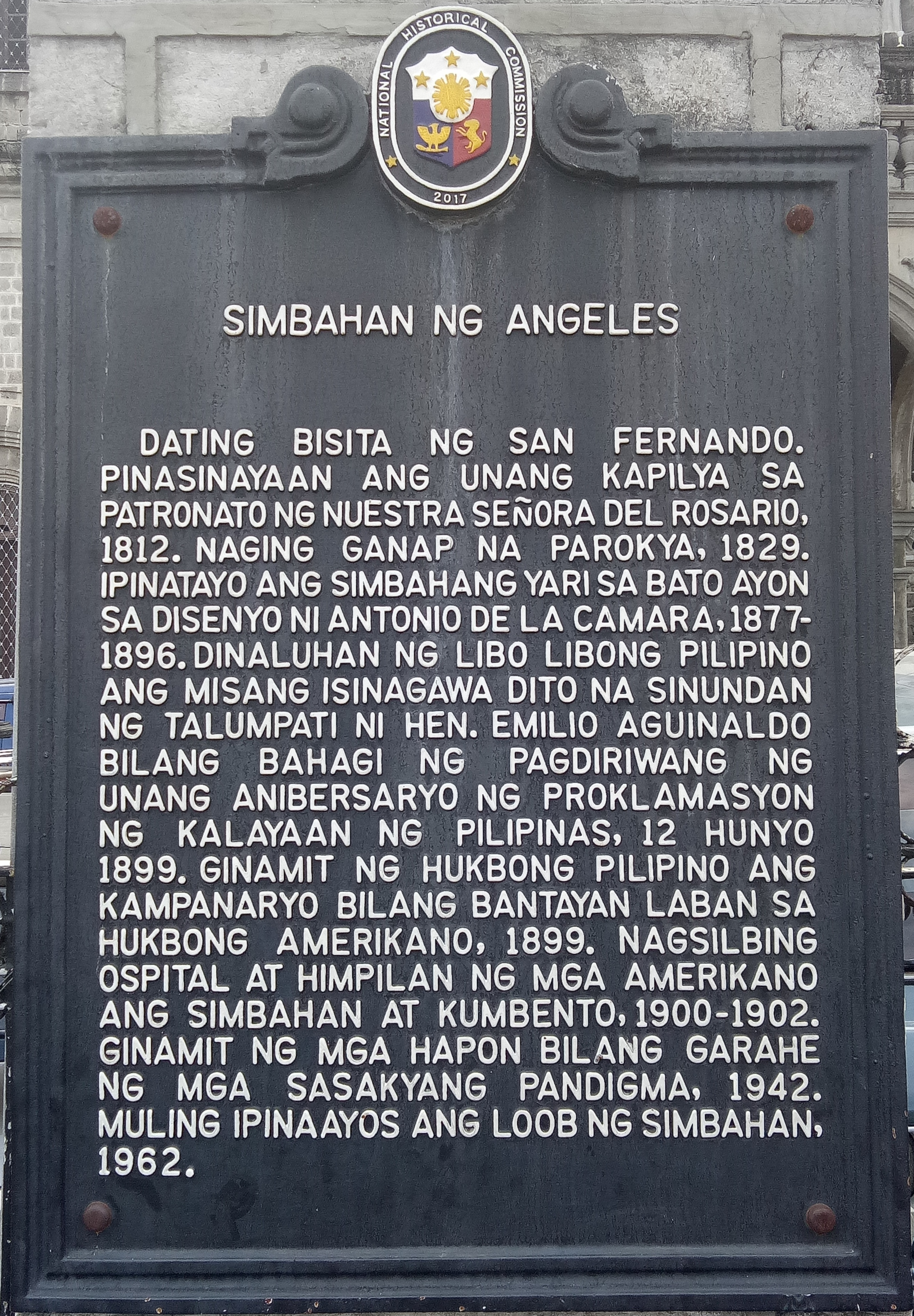
Church NHC historical marker installed in 2017

The Holy Rosary Parish Church (Pisamban Maragul) has a long history dating back to the 19th Century. The Parish itself was established during 1829 in the town of Culiat (Present Day Angeles City.) The foundations of the Holy Rosary Parish Church were first laid on October 18, 1877, by the founding families of Present day Angeles City led by Don Mariano V. Henson. It was laid out by town planners in the Spanish colonial era and is now one of the most distinctive landmarks of the city today. The church was constructed from 1877 to 1896 by the Polo y Servicio labor system, defined as the forced and unpaid labor of Filipino males for 40 days per year by the Spanish colonial government.

The first Mass was held while only half the church was built, on April 14, 1886. The second half of the church, which includes the building's distinctive dome, was finished on September 17, 1891. The twin bells were rung for the first time on February 12, 1896. The church was finally finished as it still stands today in October 1909. Its engineering and architectural skills were provided by Don Antonio de la Camara from Manila.

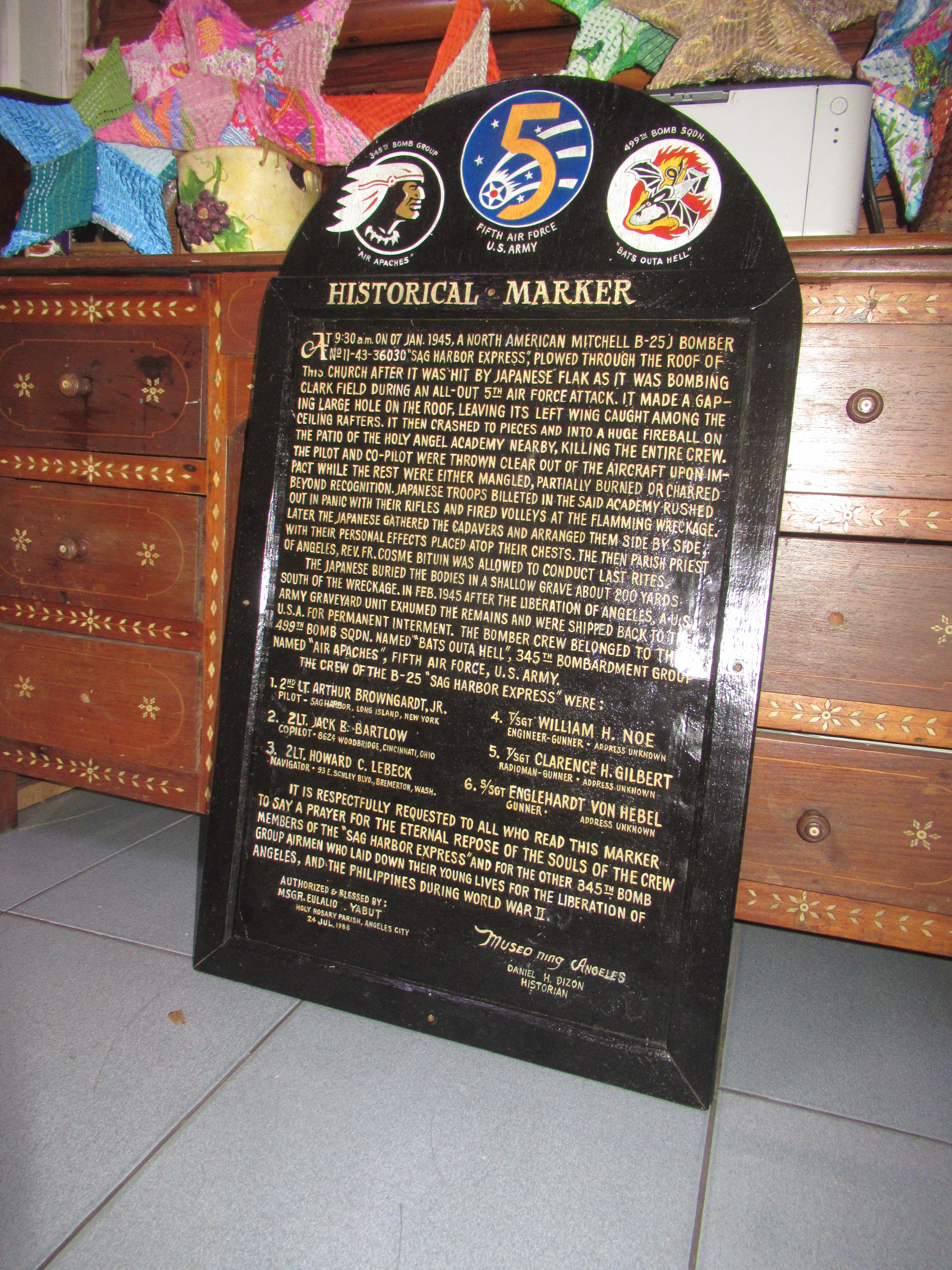
Historical marker commemorating the Japanese bombing of the church during World War II

The backyard of the church became the execution grounds from 1896-1898 during tensions between Filipino rebels and the Spanish forces. The church was also used by the U.S. Army as a military hospital from 1899 to 1900. During World War II, the church's belfry was destroyed; it was restored by the government with the help of American troops and was finished by early 1944.

In 2023, the two busiest times of the year at the church are the Good Friday Procession, where bare-footed followers of the Apung Mamacalulu, or Lord of the Holy Sepulchre, join the procession in the city proper; and the Easter Sunday celebration of Salubong that ends with the traditional meeting of the Risen Christ and Virgin Mary amidst fireworks.

The parish announced the elevation of the historic church to the status of minor basilica by Pope Leo XIV during their morning mass on February 7, 2026 (pontifical decree was issued on 21 January 2026). The church was solemnly declared as minor basilica on June 10, 2026, making it the first in the Archdiocese of San Fernando and in the province of Pampanga.

== 2019 Luzon earthquake ==
During the 2019 Luzon earthquake, the church sustained critical damage in two pillars and several windows' concrete frames, as well as cracks in several walls on the ceiling.

=== Restoration and dedication ===
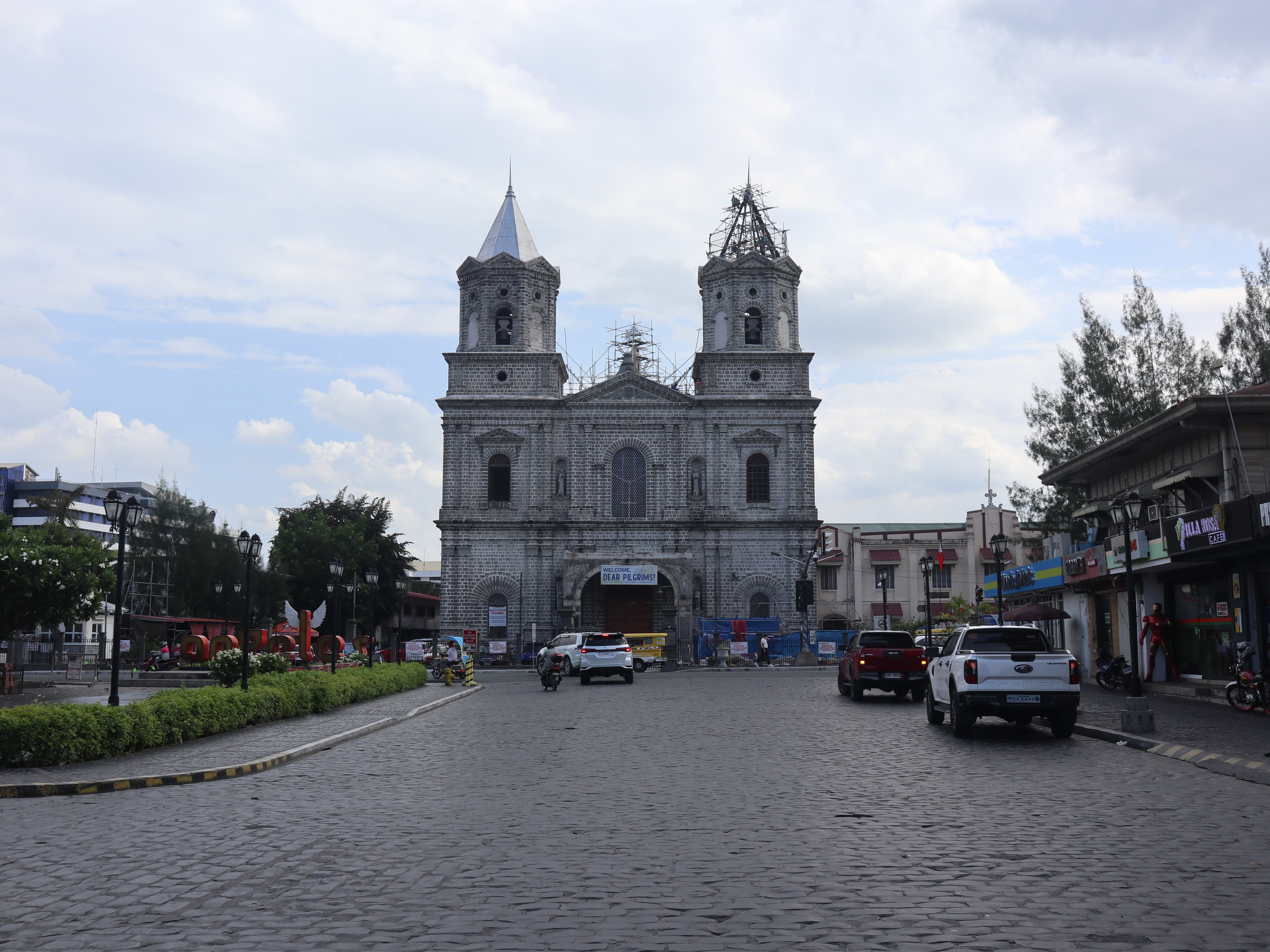
The church in 2023, showing ongoing restoration works

The 2019 earthquake exposed the church's deteriorating conditions that demanded repair, restoration and conservation work. Installation of shoring, and removal of debris and components were done to ensure the church's safety. Moreover, engineering works were performed to remove additions made to the structure over time and repair masonry defects on the west bell tower.

It was estimated that the church's restoration work is to take at least five years and would require at least PHP100 million in funding.

== Gallery ==
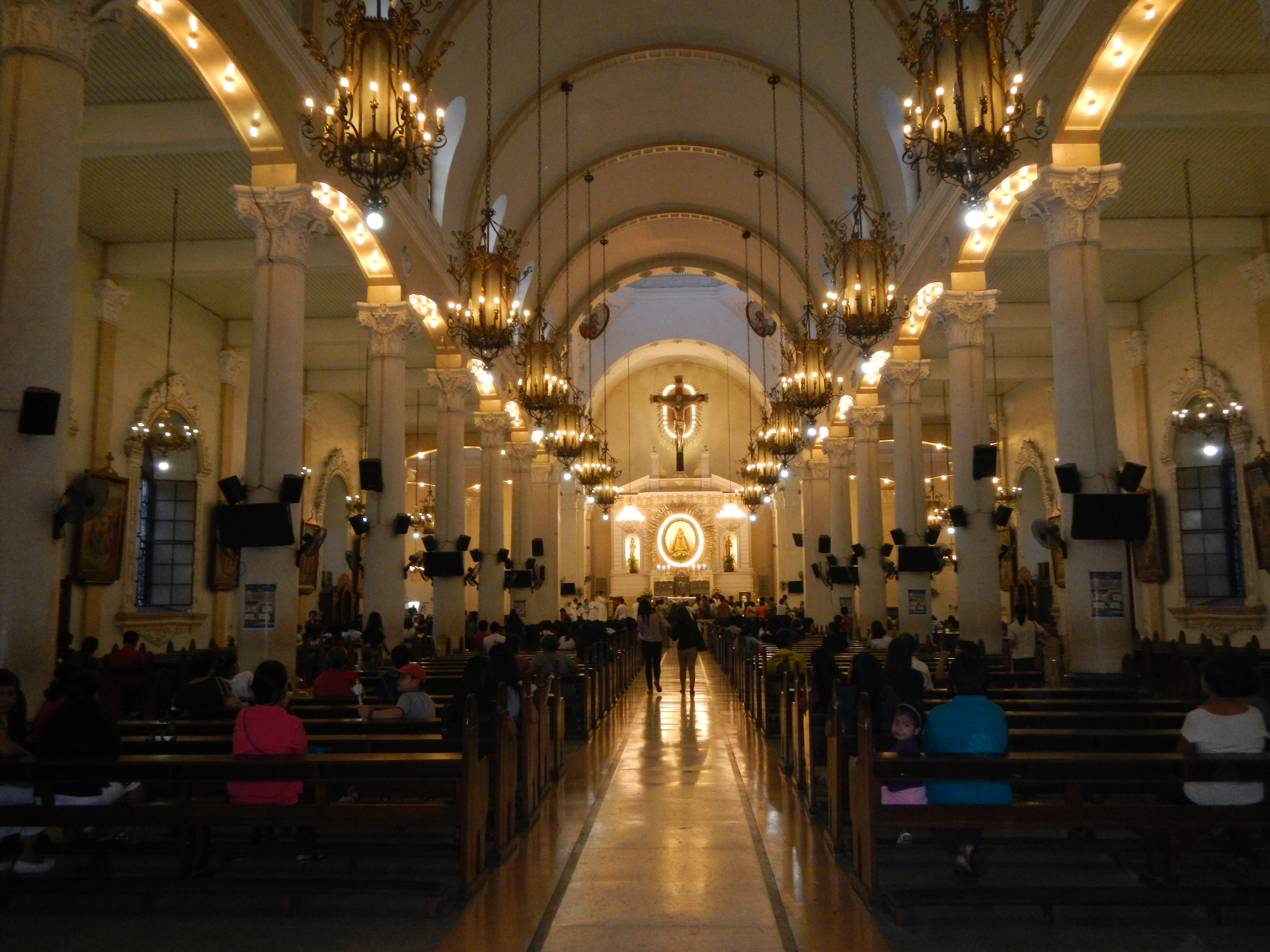
Church nave in 2013

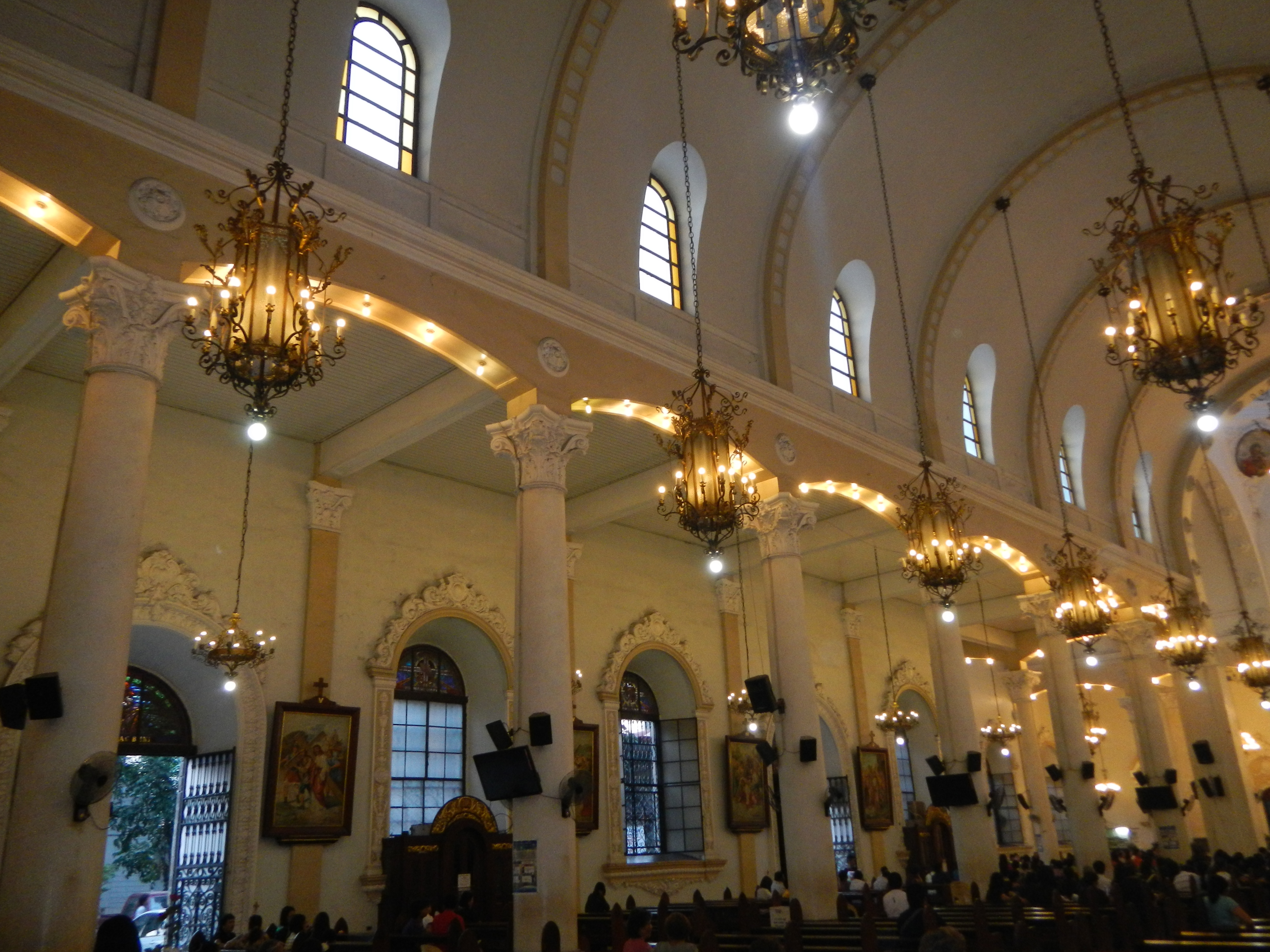
Side aisle and clerestories

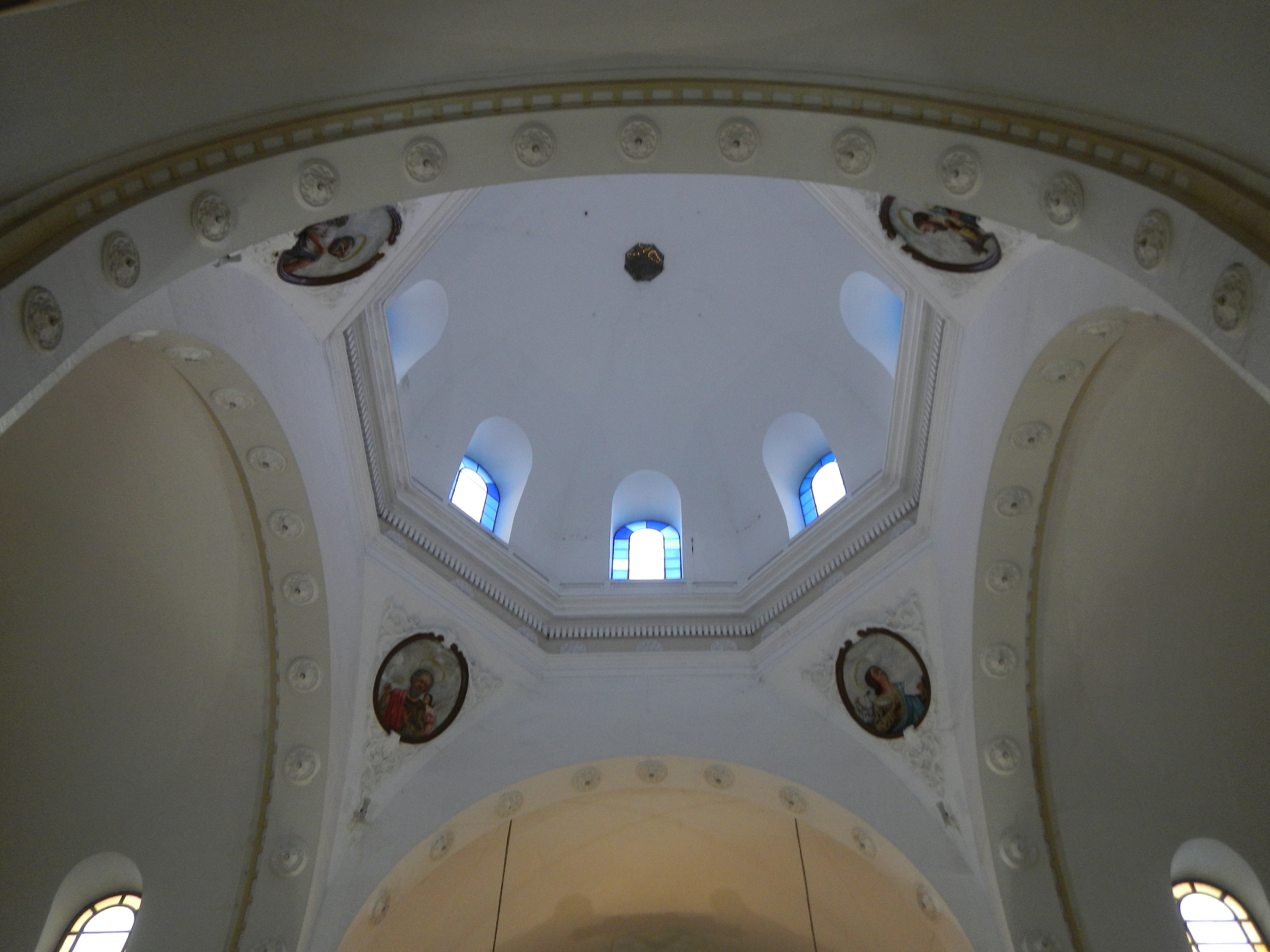
Dome interior

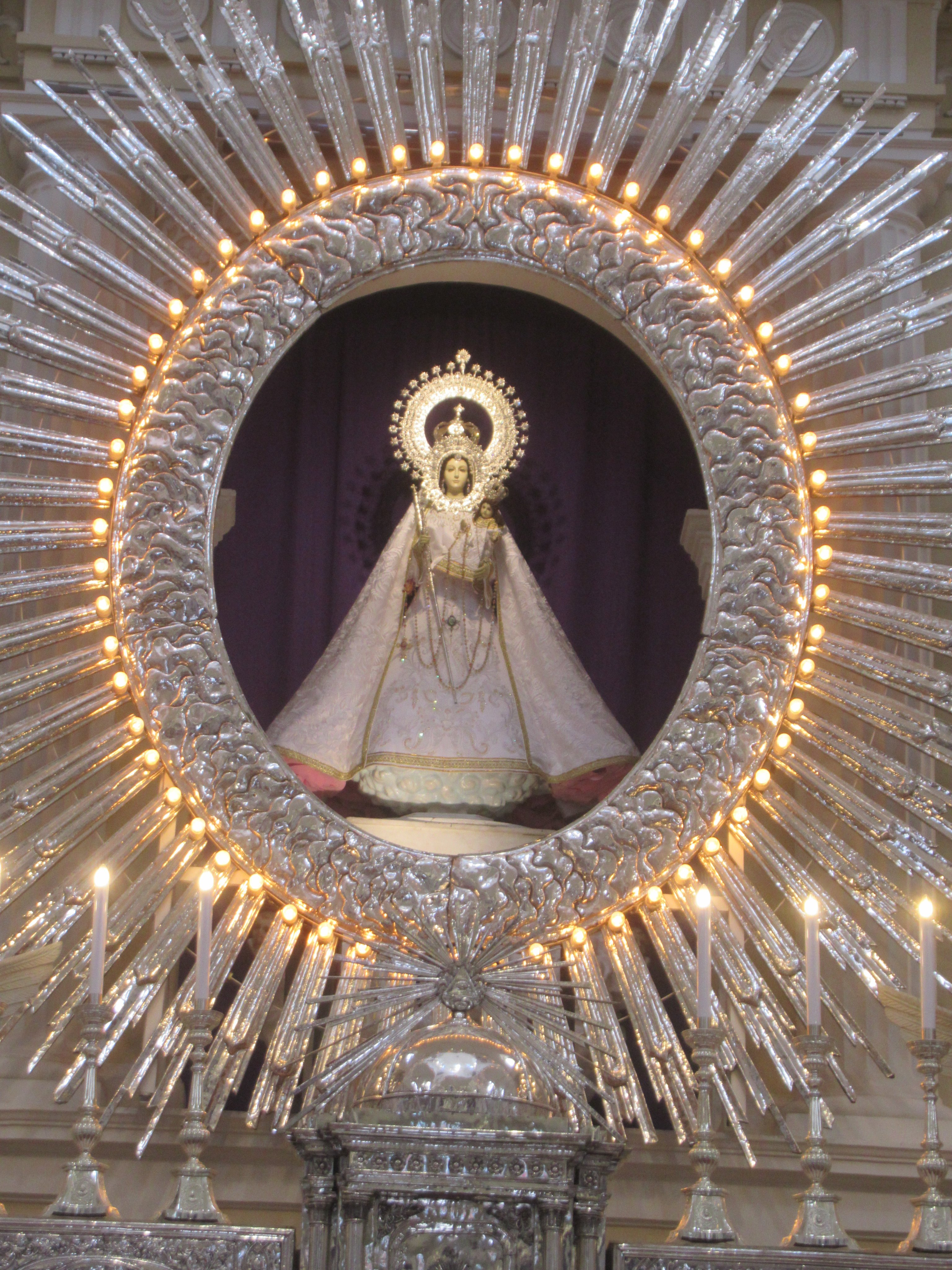
La Naval de Angeles, titular

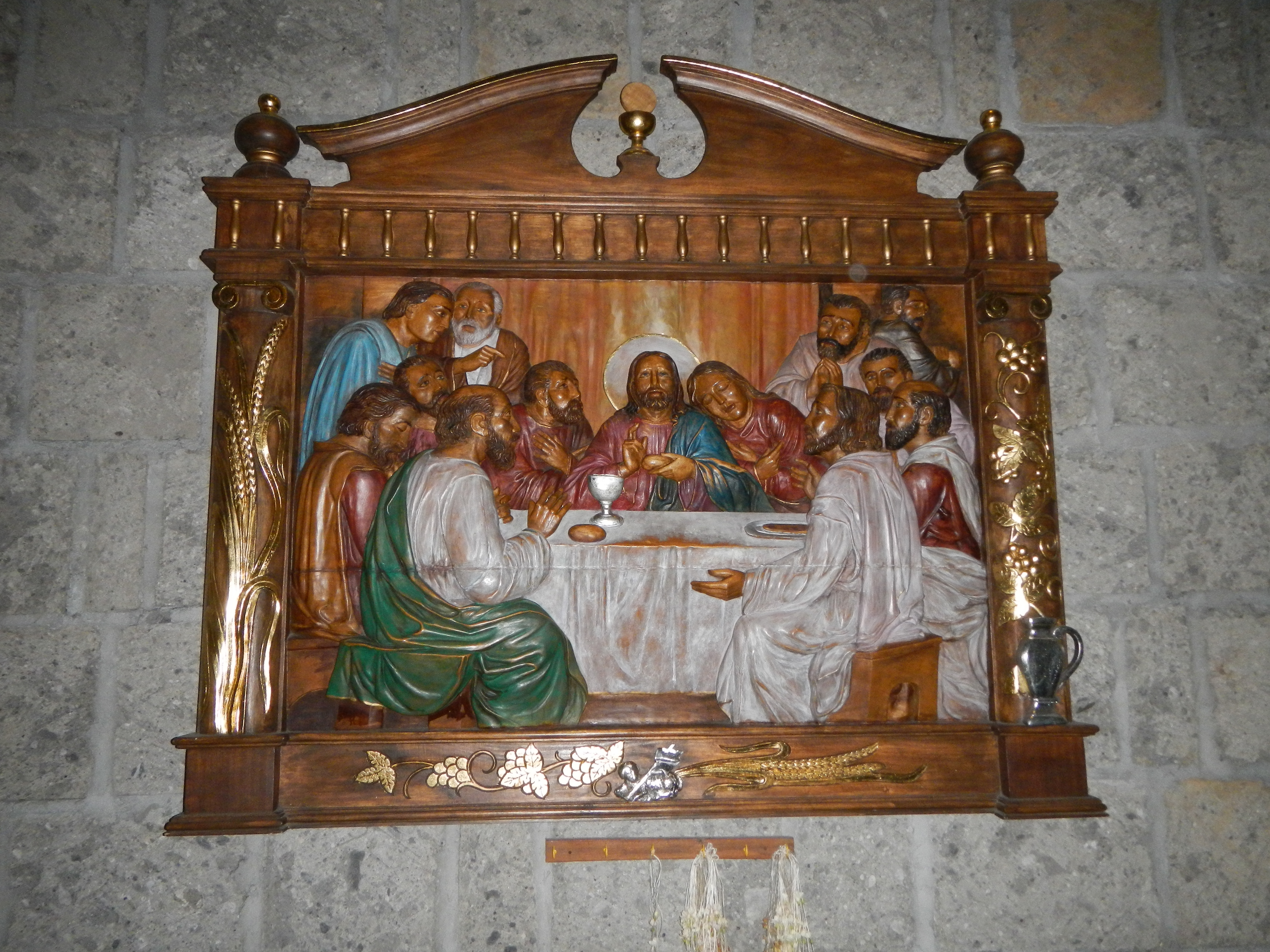
Last Supper

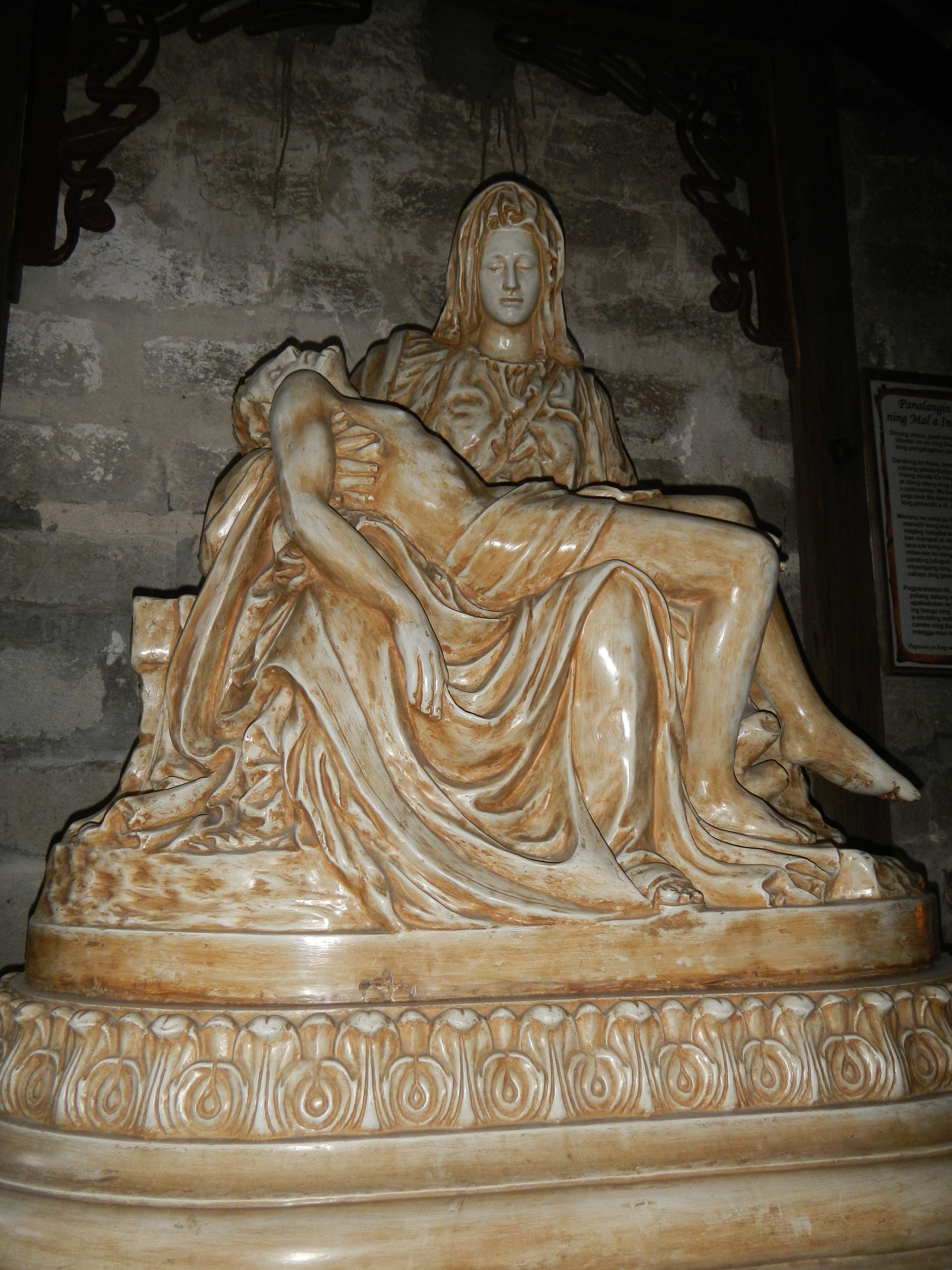
Pietà

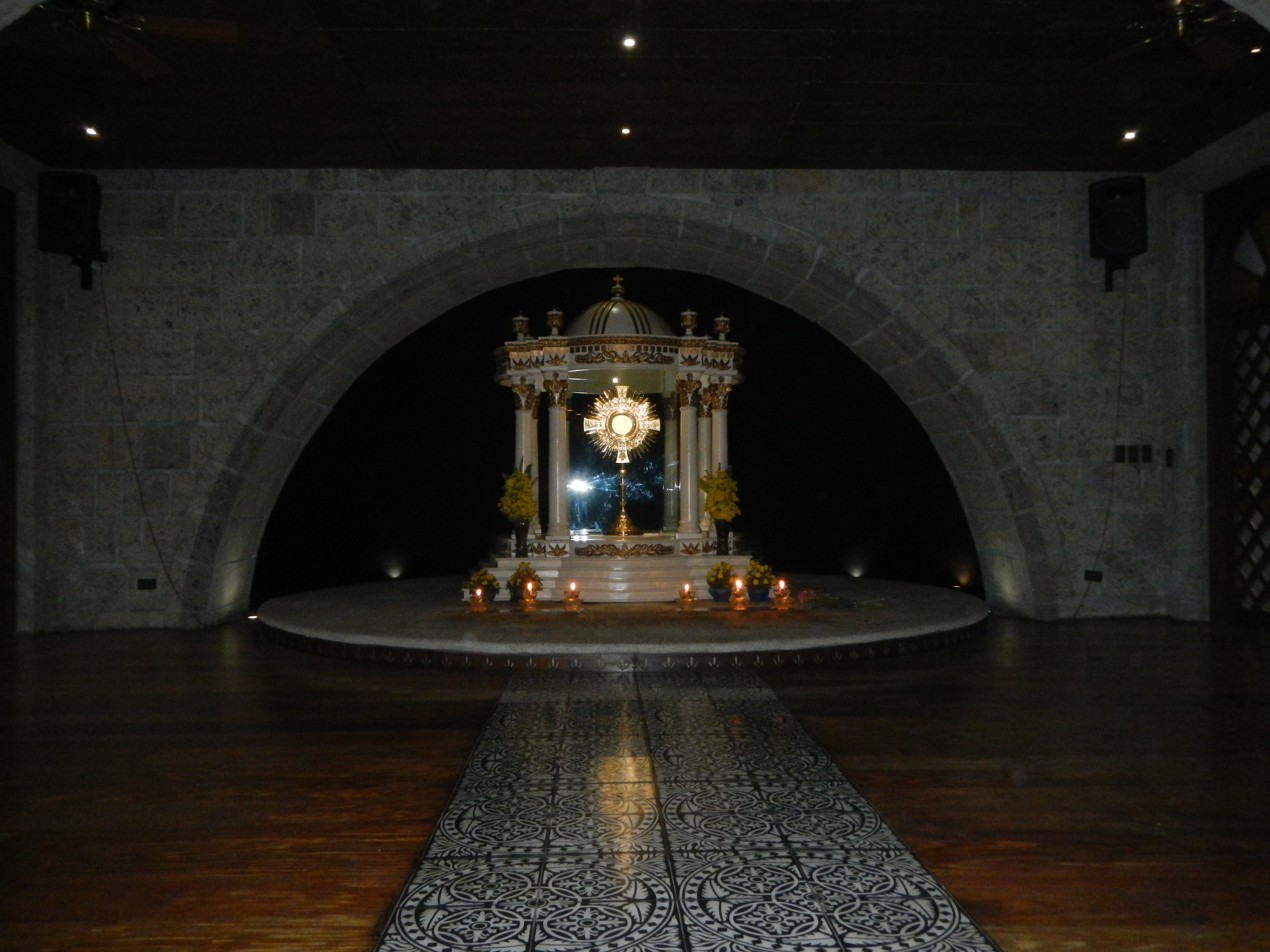
Adoration chapel at the back of the church

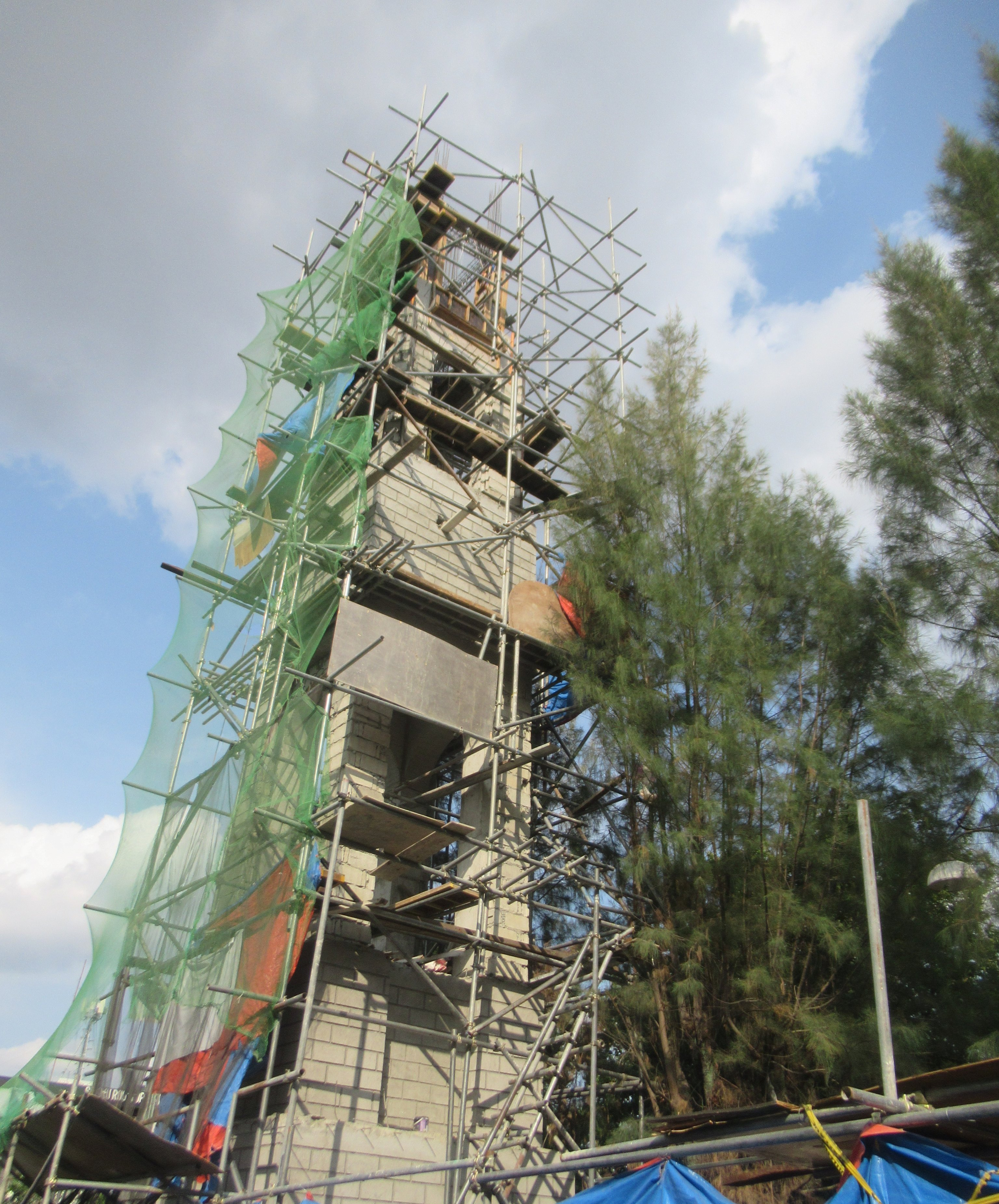
The third belfry, added after the completion of the church's restoration and consecration

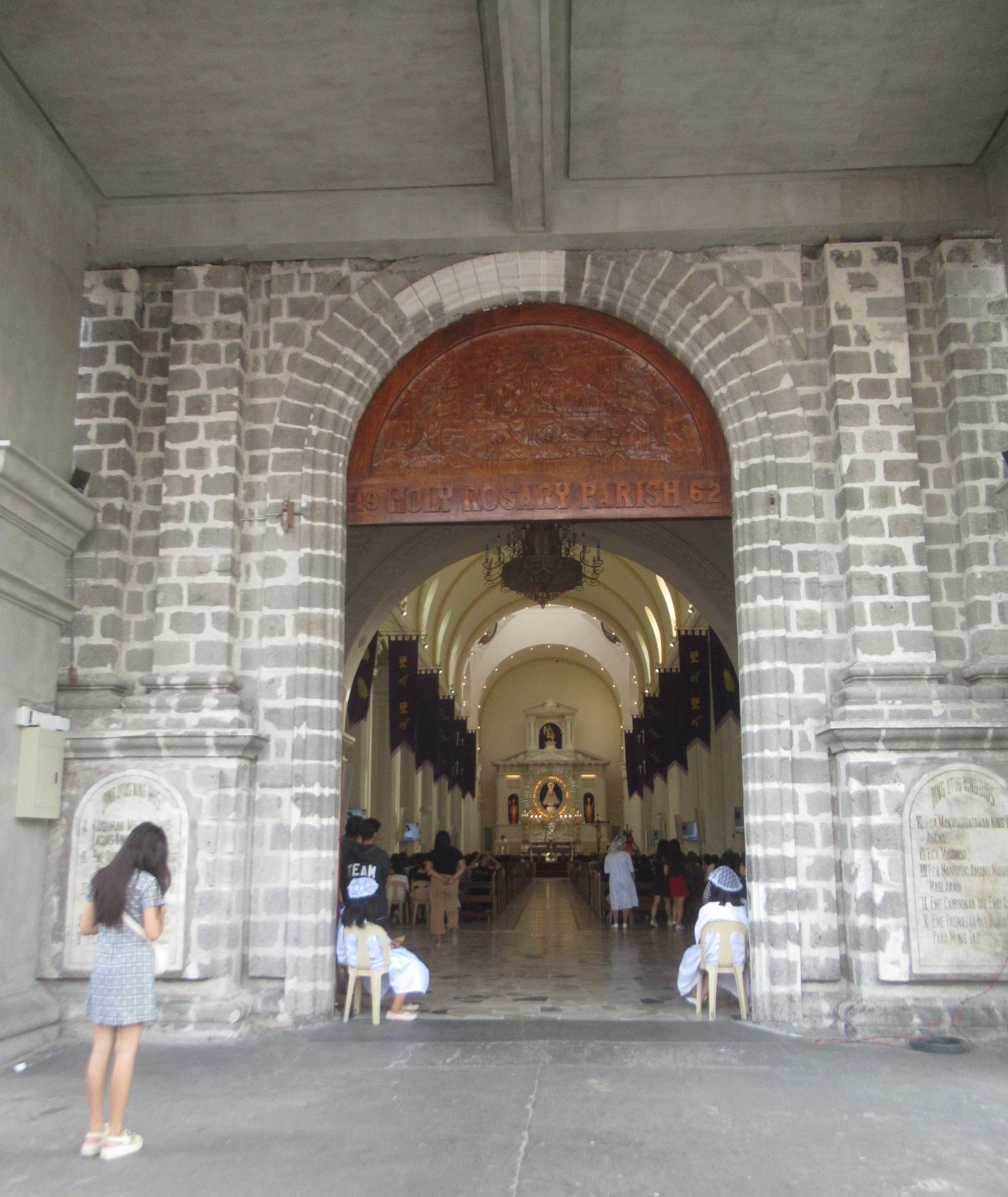
The current retablo of the church post restoration and consecration, the Santo angel custudios was enthroned again

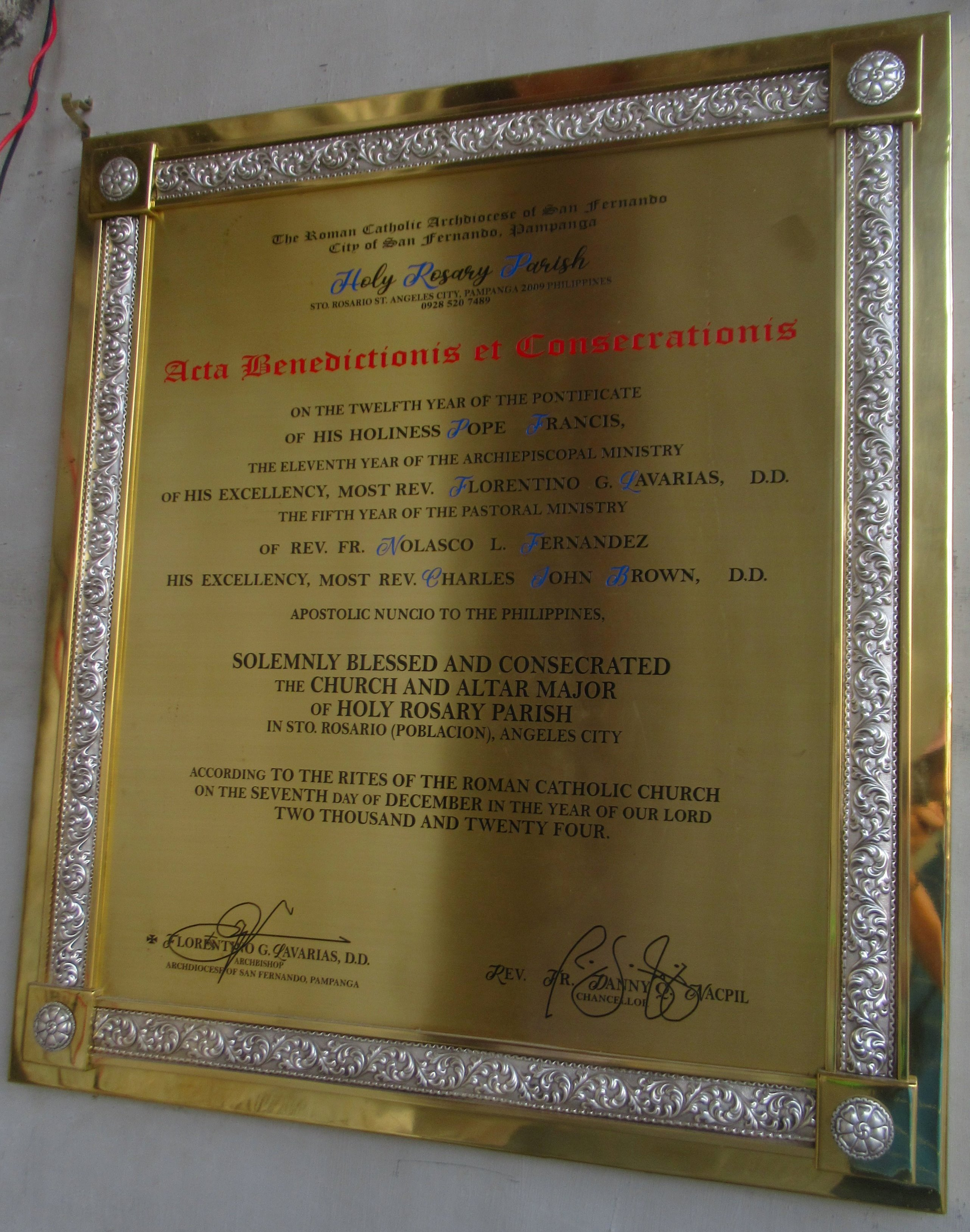

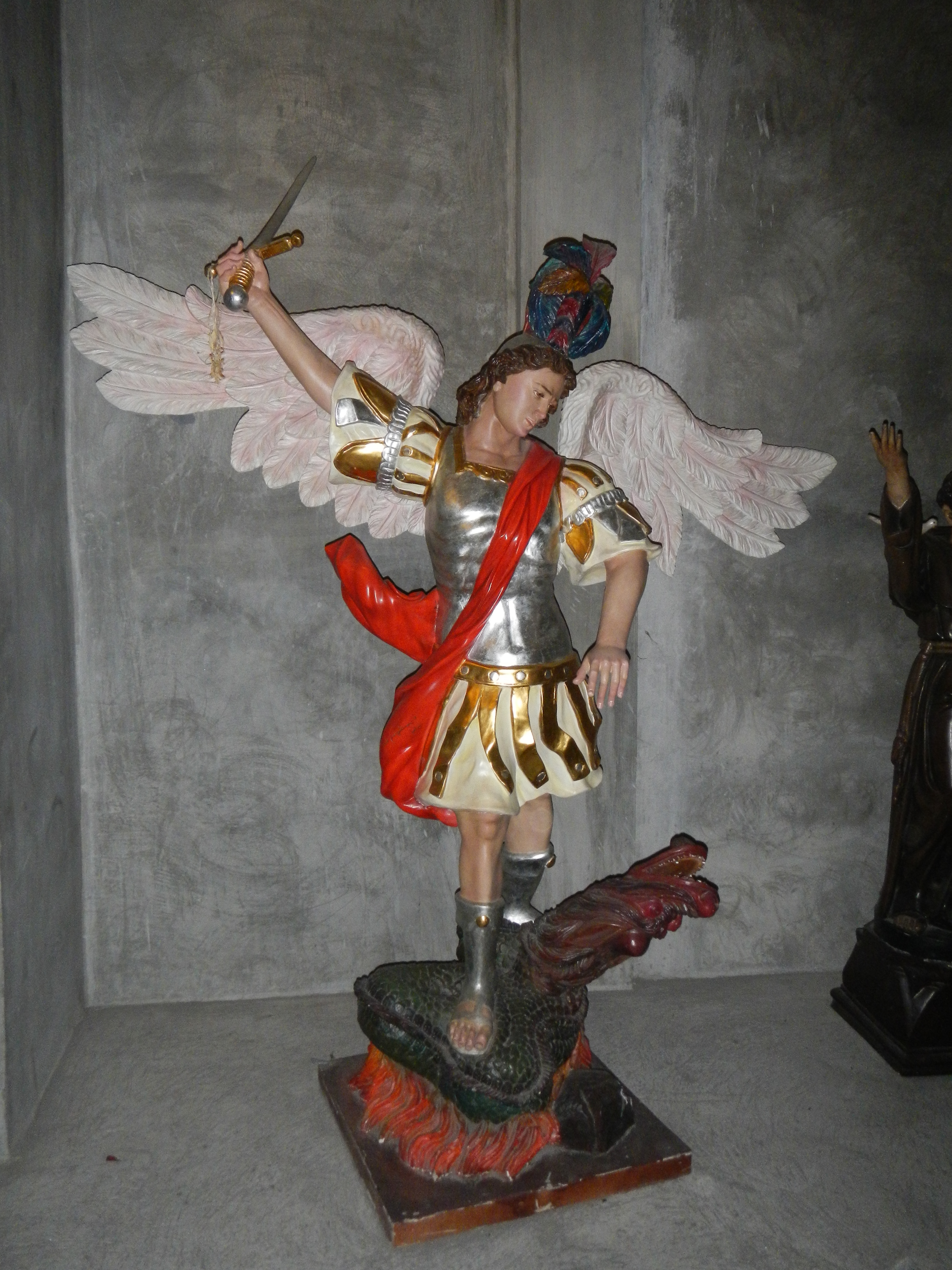
Saint Michael the archangel, only brought out during the feast of the Santo angel custudios, the titular patron of angeles

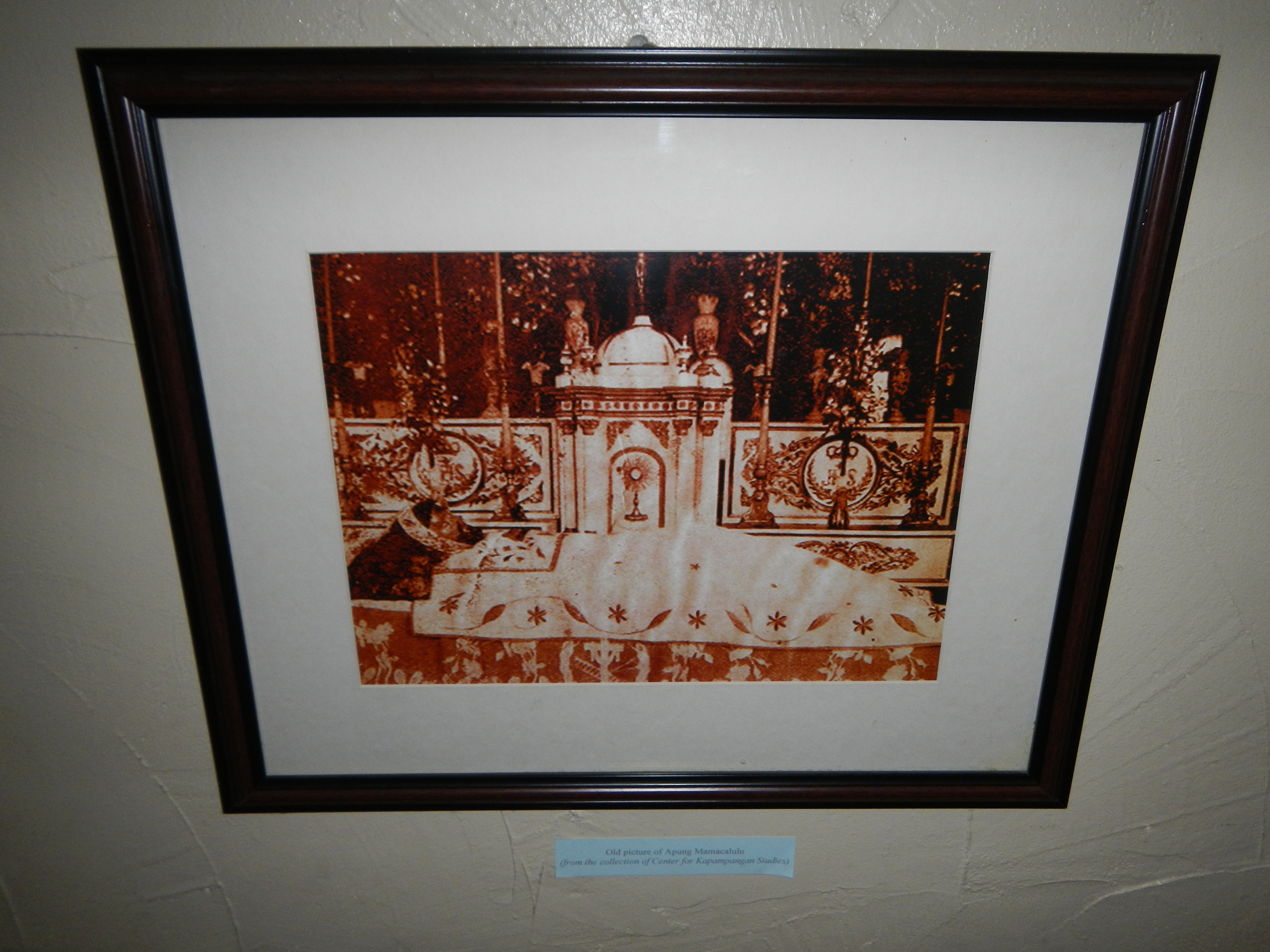
Apung Mamacalulu, the secondary patron of Angeles city

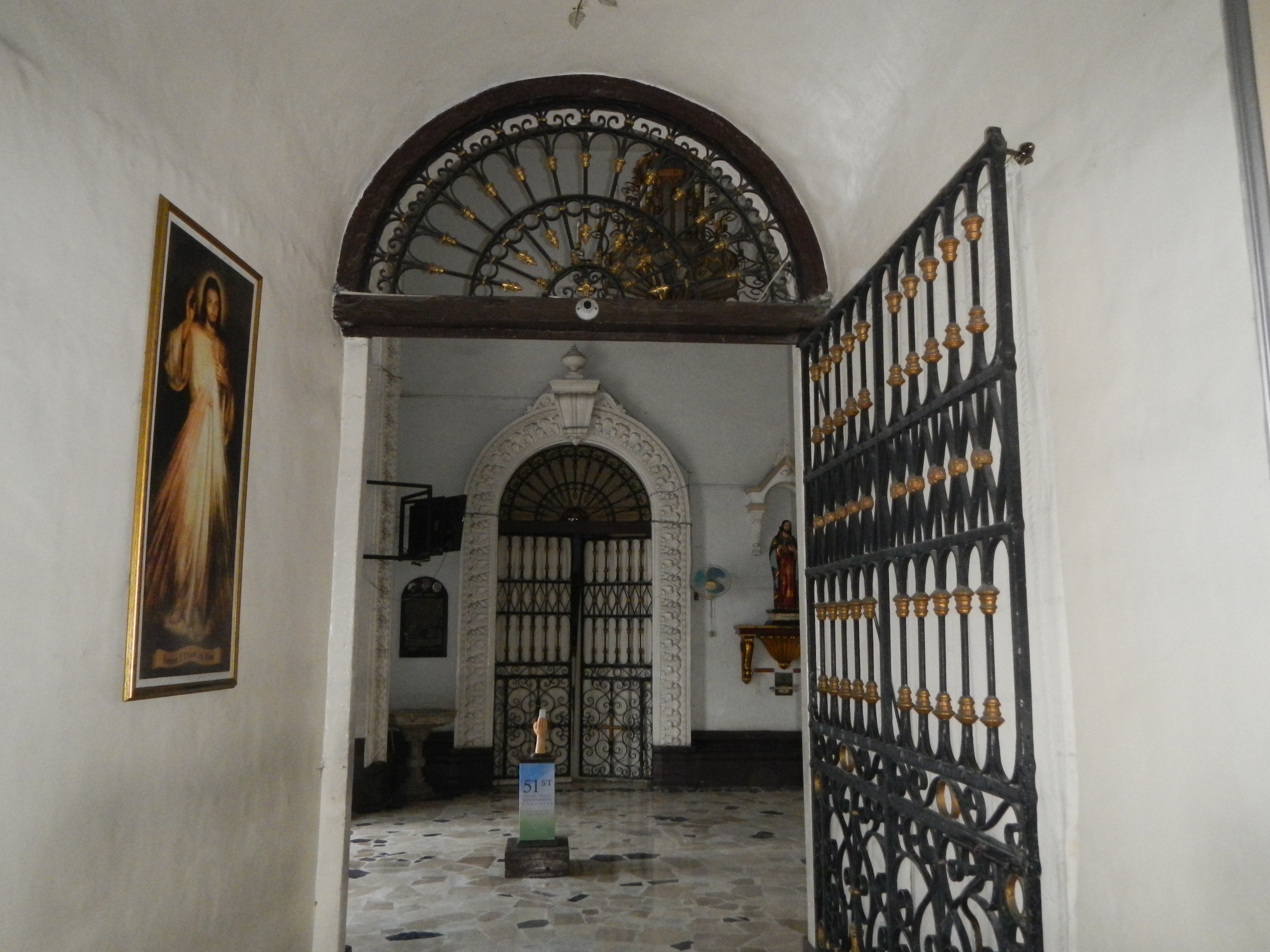
View from the entrance of the chapel of devotions

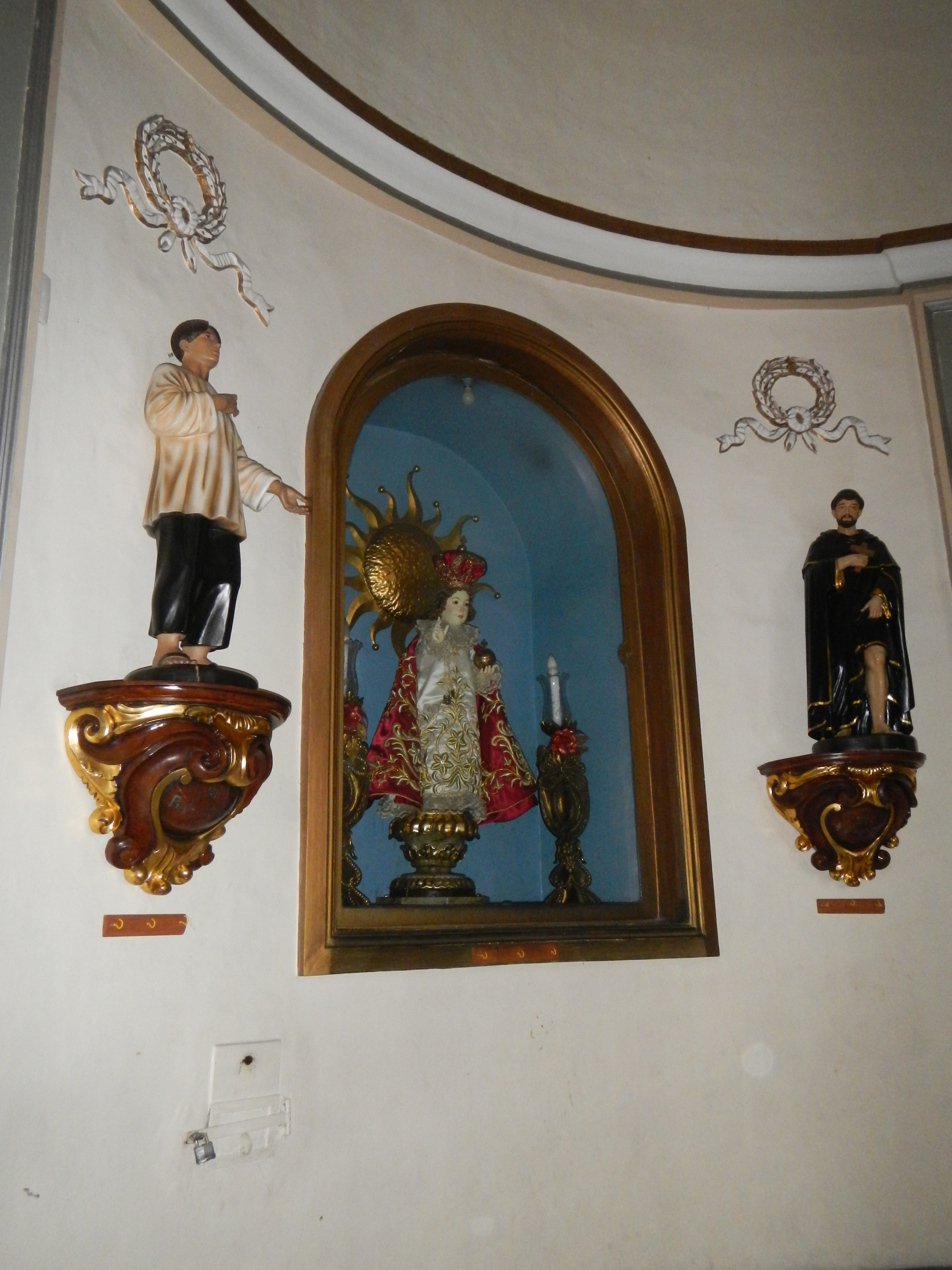
Chapel of devotions

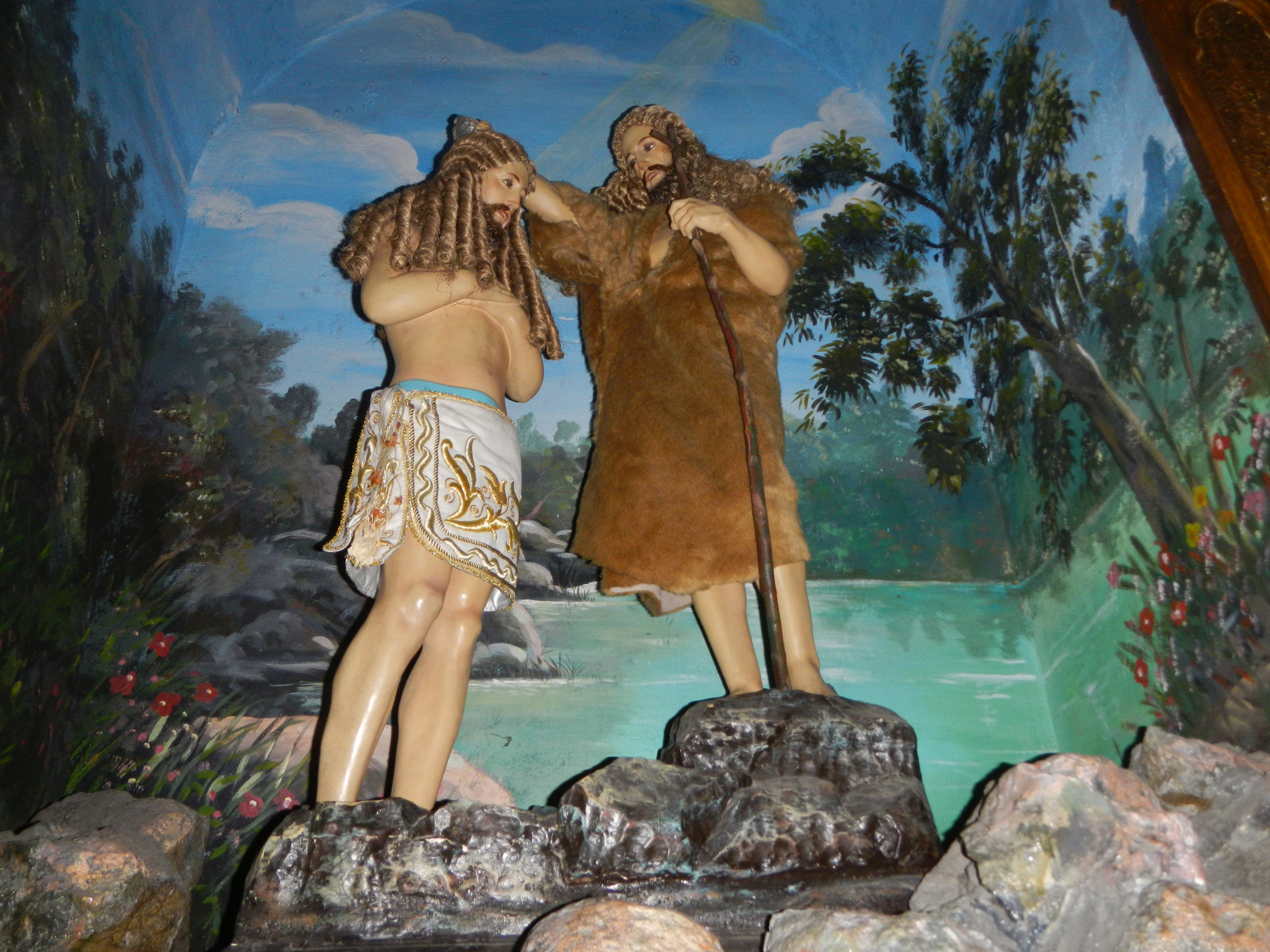
Baptistry

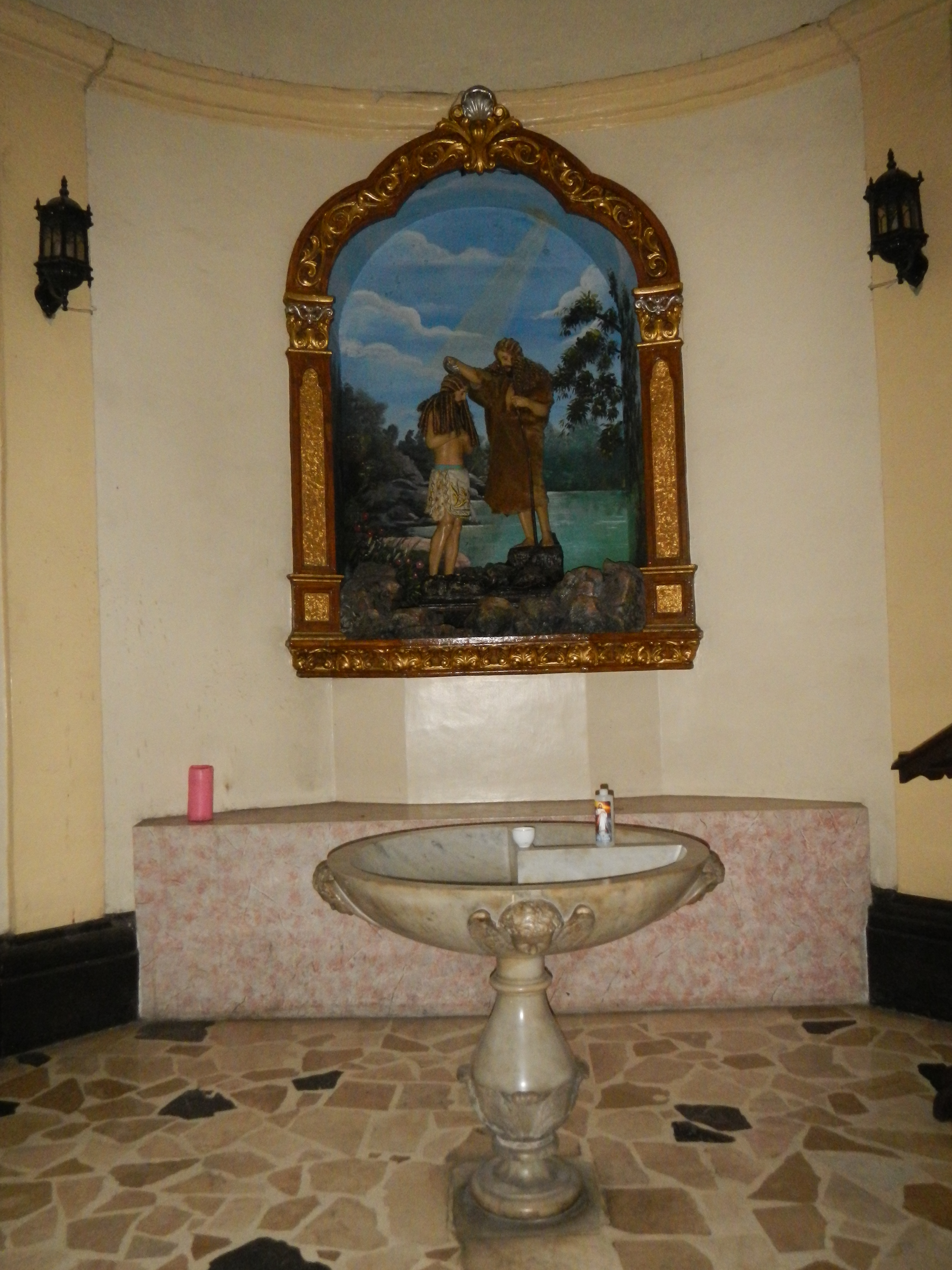
Baptismal font

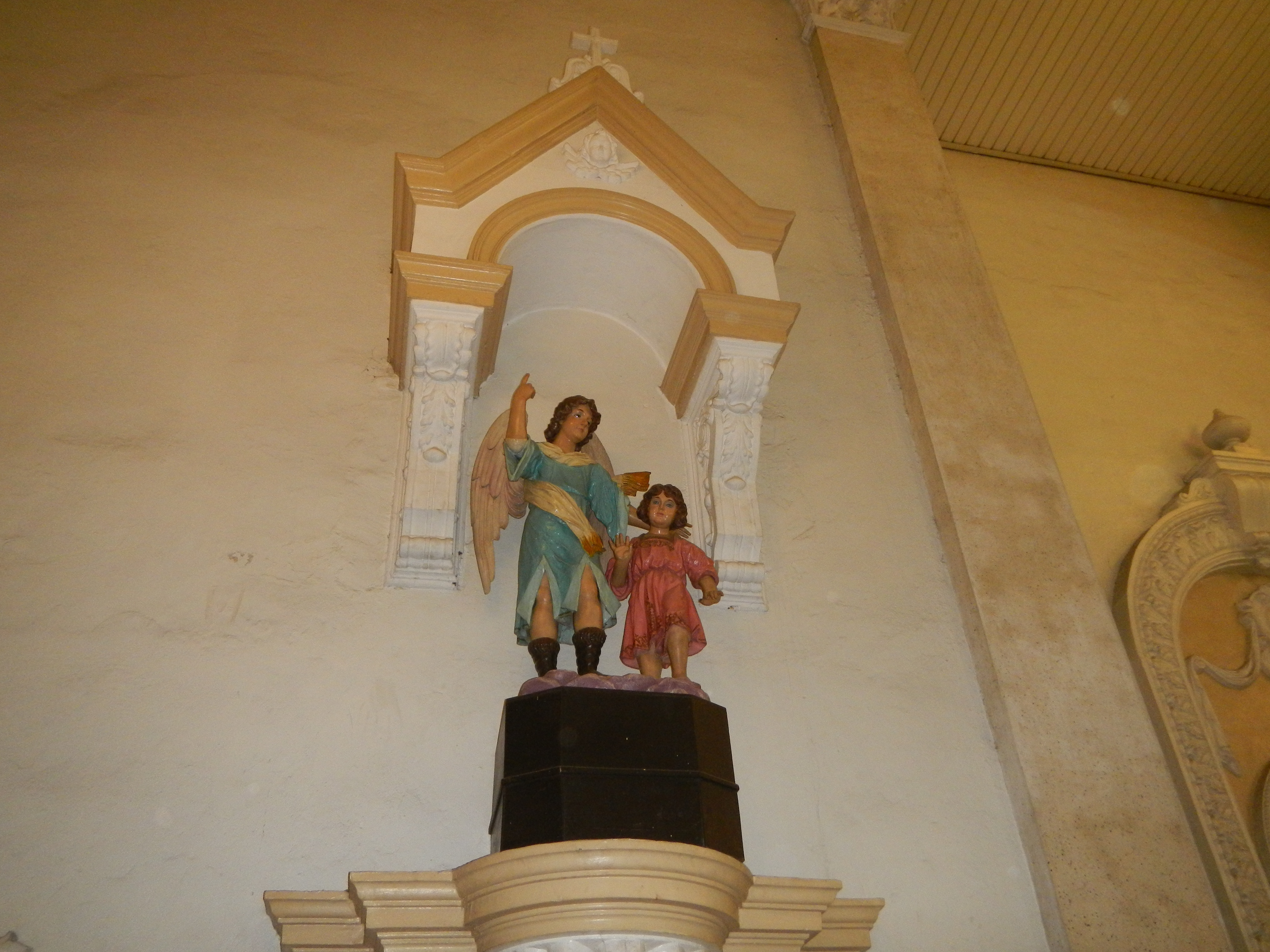
Venerada replica of the Santo Angel Custudios

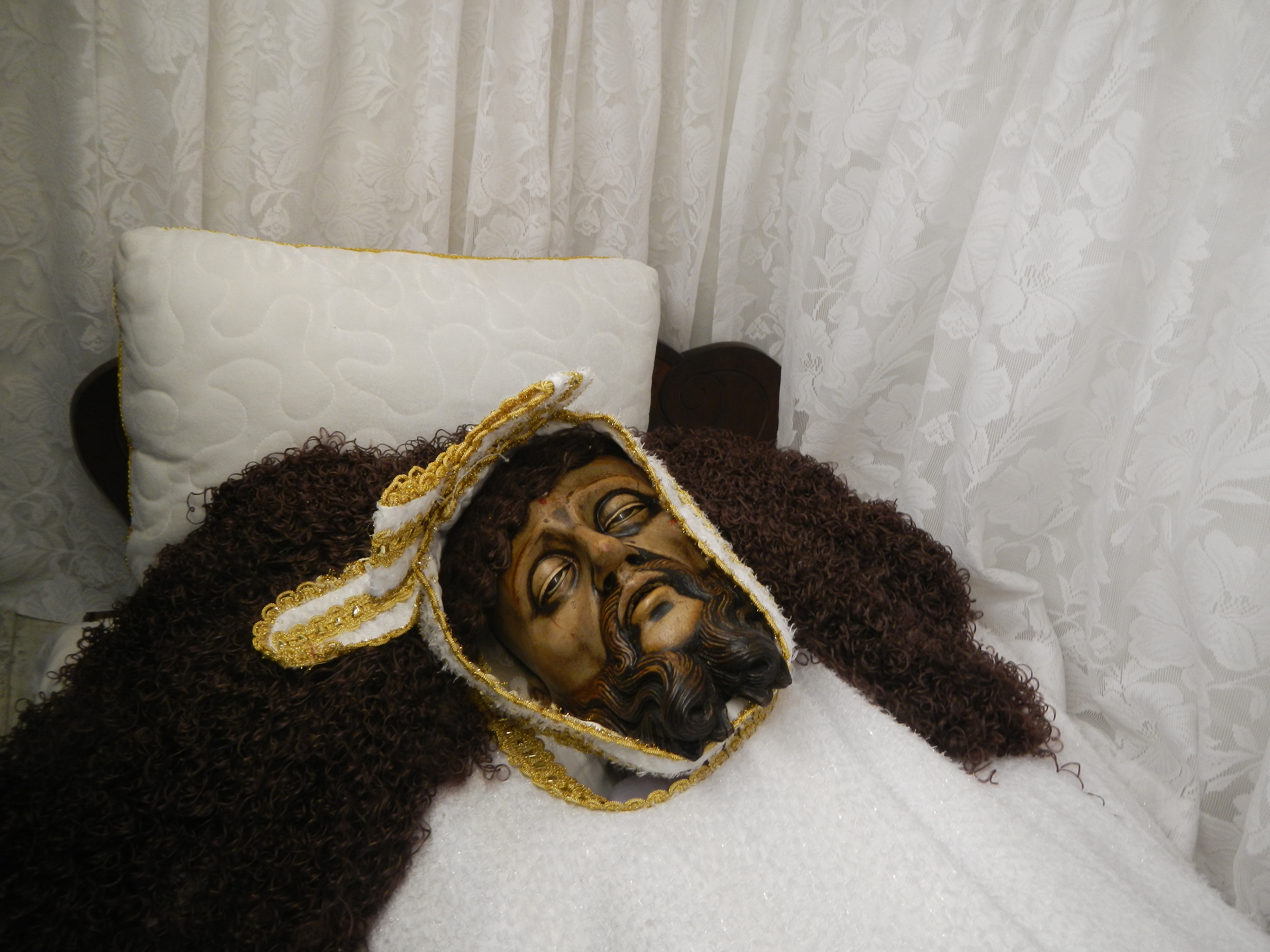
Parochial image of Apung Mamacalulu

Damage to the roof, in 1945 by an American B-25J bomber shot down by Japanese anti-aircraft fire. Aircraft would have crashed in the foreground, wreckage is not seen in this photo.
