= Christianity in Punjab, Pakistan =

Overview of the role and impact of Christianity in the Pakistani province of Punjab

Christianity is the second-largest religion in Punjab Province of Pakistan comprising 1.9% of its population. Most Christians (81%) of Pakistan live in Punjab province. There are 2,458,924 Christians in Punjab province as of 2023, up from 1,699,843 in 1998.About 90 to 95% of Punjabi Christians are Dalits from the Chuhra caste who converted from Hinduism.

The churches in Lahore include Cathedral Church of Resurrection, Sacred Heart Cathedral, Lahore, St. Andrew's Church, Lahore, St. Anthony's Church, Lahore and St. Joseph’s Church, Lahore. Lahore and Faisalabad have more Christian population than any other city in Punjab. Most Punjabi Christians are converts from the Hindu Chuhras and Mazhabi Sikh castes to Christianity during the British Raj in colonial India.

== History ==
=== Pre-colonial era ===
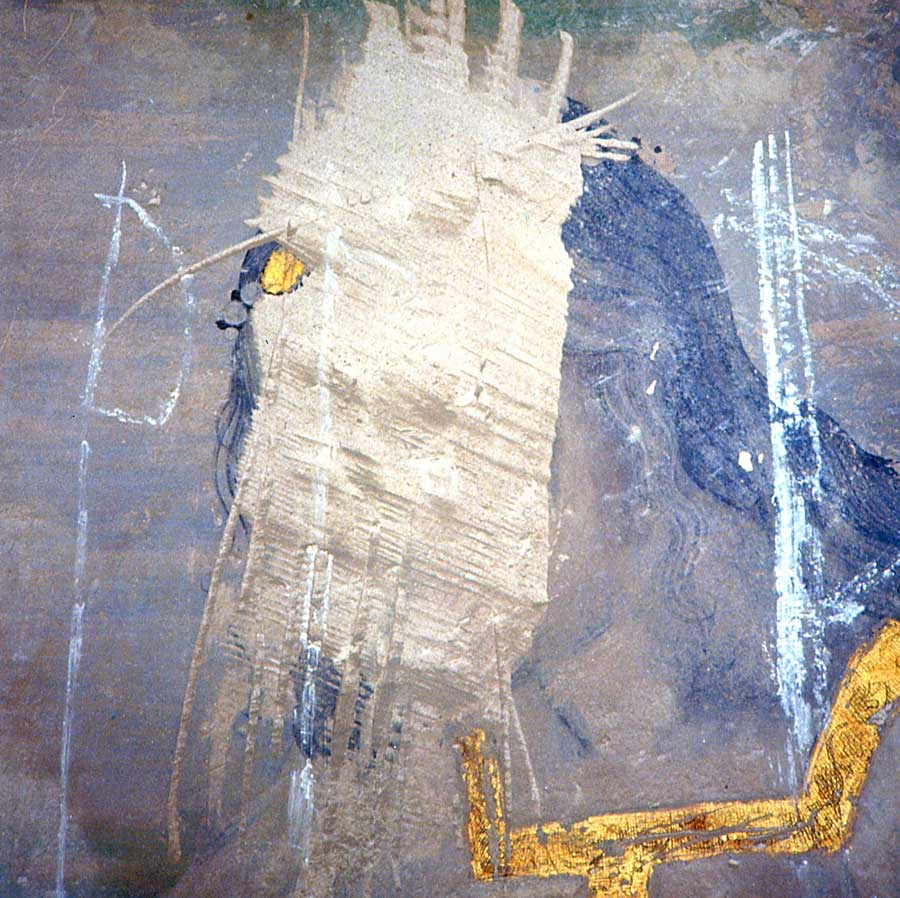
Defaced Christian mural of Saint Lucy or Dorothy, from the Sedari on the north wall of Lahore Fort, Punjab, circa 17th century

Armenians have been visiting the Indian subcontinent, especially the Punjab region, for trading purposes since the early part of the 2nd millennium. There are sparse records existing that document Armenians settling in the region prior to the reign of Akbar. In the mid-16th century, Akbar invited the Armenian merchant Hakobjan, who was based out of Lahore to settle in Agra, and asked him to convince other Armenians based in Punjab to also move to the imperial city. By the 1570s, there was a regular presence of Armenian merchants in the city of Lahore, whom specialized in high-value and low-quantity goods with Persia and Central Asia. In the early 16th century, there was an Armenian colony established in Lahore. There was an Armenian quarter of the city, enclosed by a wall of the city fort. There were interactions between the Armenians and Jesuits, as recorded in the letters left by the Jesuits. The Armenian archbishop died on his way to Lahore via a Persian land-route in 1599, with his belongings being looted. Some of the looted books of the deceased Armenian archbishop came into the possession of the Jesuit Emmanuel Pinheiro, which upset the Armenians. In a letter dating to 6 September 1604, Jerome Xavier records that the Armenians in Lahore could practice their Christian faith freely due to a royal decree (firman) issued by Akbar. Emmanuel Pinheiro, writing on 12 August 1609, states that the Mughal governor threatened to exterminate the Christian religion from the city of Lahore, spooking the Armenians, causing some of them to flee the city, as the Armenians did not have the desire to become religious martyrs. The Jesuits attempted to convince the Armenians of Lahore to convert to Catholicism. Mirza Iskandar, the father of Mirza Zulqarnain, left behind a will bequeathing a sum of 2,000 rupees to the church and Christians of Lahore. Additionally, a sum of 600 rupees was for a Christian cemetery of Lahore.

The Armenians were hesitant to get on the bad side of the Jesuits, as the Jesuits were close with the Mughal viceroy and held political sway as a result. François Valentyn recorded that on 10 December 1711 when a mission of the Dutch East India Company led by John Jeshua Kettler reached Lahore, they were greeted by an Armenian bishop and some Jesuits. The existence of an Armenian bishop in Lahore in 1711 points to the existence of an established church or chapel in the city to cater to a large congregation.

In 1735, the Jesuit Emmanuel de Figueiredo wrote that the elite Mughal military units stationed in Lahore consisted of many Christian members in its officer-classes.

After the second Durrani Afghan invasion of Punjab, Ahmad Shah Durrani is said to have taken all of the Christian gunners who were in the service of Mir Mannu, the viceroy of Lahore province, back to Kabul. In 1757, during the third Durrani invasion of Punjab, the Armenian quarter of the city of Lahore still existed, as Armenian and Georgian soldiers who were employed in the Durrani military protected it from the Afghans, sparing it and its inhabitants from being pillaged and destroyed like much of the surrounding city. An Armenian is said to have cast the famous Zamzama gun in Lahore in 1761.

Jesuits arrived in the region in the 16th century during the Mughal period but their nascent mission was temporarily shut-down during the reign of emperor Shah Jahan. The Jesuit mission in the Indian subcontinent began in 1545, which was marked by the arrival of Francis Xavier in Goa. In 1578, Akbar requested for two Jesuits to explain the Christian religion to him at his court in Fatehpur Sikri. Antoni de Montserrat, whom had arrived in the Indian subcontinent several years earlier in 1574, and Rodolfo Acquaviva, were selected for the task. The pair left Goa in November 1579 whilst being accompanied by a Persian convert named Henriquez, who would act as their translator at the Mughal court, and the group were also chaperoned by a member of Akbar's court. After three months of travel, the two Jesuits and their group arrived at Akbar's court, where they were warmly received and would spend much time in-dialogue with court officials and members of other religions. In 1581, Montserrat accompanied Akbar on a military campaign to the northwestern regions, including Punjab, reaching as far as Kabul, with Montserrat producing an early map of the northwestern region of the subcontinent. In 1595, Bento de Góis travelled to Lahore and Agra as a companion of Jerome Xavier, paying a visit to Akbar's court.

In 1606, Jerome Xavier was in Lahore during the execution of the fifth Sikh guru, Guru Arjan, with Xavier recording an eyewitness testimony of the incident. Jerome Xavier, in appreciation of the courage of Guru Arjan, wrote back to Lisbon, that Guru Arjan suffered and was tormented.

According to Ilay Cooper, Christian murals were painted in a Sedari pavilion located on the North Wall of Lahore Fort during the reign of Jahangir in circa 1618.

=== Colonial era ===
Christian population in British Indian Punjab (1881-1947) and Pakistani Punjab (1948-present)
Year	Pop.	±% p.a.
1881	12,992	—
1901	42,371	+6.09%
1911	144,514	+13.05%
1921	247,030	+5.51%
1931	324,730	+2.77%
1941	395,311	+1.99%
1951	402,617	+0.18%
1998	1,699,843	+3.11%
2017	2,063,063	+1.02%
2023	2,458,924	+2.97%

Christianity became established in the Punjab Province of British India in 1834. The Christian Mission in Ludhiana set up in the first Sikh Gurmukhi printing press the following year.

The Christians of colonial India were active in the Indian National Congress and wider Indian independence movement, being collectively represented in the All India Conference of Indian Christians, which advocated for swaraj and opposed the partition of India.

The meeting of the All India Conference of Indian Christians in Lahore in December 1922, which had a large attendance of Punjabis, resolved that the clergymen of the Church in India should be drawn from the ranks of Indians, rather than foreigners. The AICIC also stated that Indian Christians would not tolerate any discrimination based on race or skin colour.

S. K. Datta of Lahore, who served as the principal of Forman Christian College, became the president of the All India Conference of Indian Christians, representing the Indian Christian community at the Second Round Table Conference, where he agreed with Mahatma Gandhi's views on minorities and Depressed Classes.

On 30 October 1945, the All India Conference of Indian Christians formed a joint committee with the Catholic Union of India that passed a resolution in which, "in the future constitution of India, the profession, practice and propagation of religion should be guaranteed and that a change of religion should not involve any civil or political disability." This joint committee enabled the Christians in colonial India to stand united, and in front of the British Parliamentary Delegation "the committee members unanimously supported the move for independence and expressed complete confidence in the future of the community in India." The office for this joint committee was opened in Delhi, in which the Vice-Chancellor of Andhra University M. Rahnasamy served as president and B.L. Rallia Ram of Lahore served as General Secretary. Six members of the joint committee were elected to the Minorities Committee of the Constituent Assembly.

=== Post-independence era ===
Following the partition of colonial India, the Catholic Union of India granted independence to its branches in Sind and Baluchistan in its Second Annual General Meeting in Bangalore in October 1947, which was presided by Ruthnasamy.

=== 21st century ===
Punjab is considered a province with persecution of Christians. The high-profile Asia Bibi blasphemy case was a famous example of this. Bibi was arrested in Punjab in 2009 under the blasphemy law in Pakistan, found guilty and sentenced to execution. After ten years in prison, and an international campaign, she was acquitted and she and her family moved to Canada, then on to France. The governor of Punjab, Salman Taseer, was assassinated for his defence of Bibi.

In 2022, Freedom House rated religious freedom across the country as 1 out of 4.

In April 2023, Pentecostals in Punjab started a new political party, named the United Punjab Party.

== Geographical distribution ==
=== 2023 Census ===
According to the 2023 Census of Pakistan, 602,431, or 24.5% of total Christian population in Punjab, lived in the Lahore District, forming 4.64% of the district population. Other districts with significant population include Faisalabad (308,580 person or 3.40%), Gujranwala (207,782 persons or 3.49%), Sialkot (154,884 persons or 3.46%), Sheikhupura (148,784 persons or 3.67%) and Rawalpindi (112,822 persons or 1.96%).

=== Colonial era ===
At the district level in the western portion of British Punjab province, as per the 1941 census, the largest Christian concentrations existed in Sheikhupura District (Christians formed 7.04 percent of the total population and numbered 60,054 persons), Gujranwala District (6.67 percent or 60,829 persons), Sialkot District (6.37 percent or 75,831 persons), Lahore District (4.14 percent or 70,147 persons), and Lyallpur District (3.72 percent or 51,948 persons).

Christians in the administrative divisions that compose the contemporary Punjab, Pakistan region (1881–1941)
District or Princely State	1881		1901		1911		1921		1931		1941	
District or Princely State	Pop.	%	Pop.	%	Pop.	%	Pop.	%	Pop.	%	Pop.	%
Lahore District	4,644	0.5%	7,296	0.63%	21,781	2.1%	46,454	4.11%	57,097	4.14%	70,147	4.14%
Rawalpindi District	3,822	0.47%	7,614	0.82%	8,320	1.52%	9,286	1.63%	7,486	1.18%	9,014	1.15%
Multan District	1,861	0.34%	1,964	0.28%	2,441	0.3%	6,006	0.67%	9,924	0.84%	14,290	0.96%
Sialkot District	1,535	0.15%	11,939	1.1%	48,620	4.96%	62,266	6.64%	66,365	6.77%	75,831	6.37%
Jhelum District	416	0.07%	271	0.05%	450	0.09%	430	0.09%	672	0.12%	893	0.14%
Gujrat District	255	0.04%	460	0.06%	570	0.08%	2,373	0.29%	3,097	0.34%	4,449	0.4%
Gujranwala District	194	0.03%	2,748	0.36%	16,215	1.76%	27,308	4.38%	49,364	6.71%	60,829	6.67%
Montgomery District	93	0.02%	66	0.01%	581	0.11%	10,408	1.46%	17,245	1.72%	24,432	1.84%
Dera Ghazi Khan District	82	0.02%	152	0.03%	76	0.02%	47	0.01%	31	0.01%	87	0.01%
Muzaffargarh District	33	0.01%	33	0.01%	60	0.01%	356	0.06%	246	0.04%	227	0.03%
Shahpur District	29	0.01%	91	0.02%	8,616	1.25%	11,270	1.57%	11,294	1.37%	12,770	1.28%
Bahawalpur State	13	0%	83	0.01%	199	0.03%	283	0.04%	1,054	0.11%	3,048	0.23%
Jhang District	11	0%	38	0.01%	201	0.04%	449	0.08%	494	0.07%	763	0.09%
Shakargarh Tehsil (Note: Part of Gurdaspur District which was awarded to Pakistan as part of the Radcliffe Line.)	4	0%	900	0.38%	3,486	1.66%	3,733	1.75%	4,487	1.81%	4,779	1.64%
Lyallpur District (Note: District formerly inscribed as the Chenab Colony on the 1901 census, later renamed to Lyallpur District, created between Jhang District, Gujranwala District, Lahore District, Montgomery District, and Multan District to account for the large population increase in the region, primarily due to the Chenab Canal Colony.)	—N/a	—N/a	8,672	1.1%	32,023	3.73%	42,004	4.29%	45,518	3.95%	51,948	3.72%
Mianwali District	—N/a	—N/a	44	0.01%	168	0.05%	369	0.1%	380	0.09%	358	0.07%
Biloch Trans–Frontier Tract	—N/a	—N/a	0	0%	0	0%	0	0%	0	0%	0	0%
Attock District (Note: District created in 1904 by taking Talagang Tehsil from Jhelum District and Pindi Gheb, Fateh Jang and Attock Tehsils from Rawalpindi District.)	—N/a	—N/a	—N/a	—N/a	707	0.14%	557	0.11%	710	0.12%	1,392	0.21%
Sheikhupura District (Note: District created between Gujranwala District, Sialkot District, Amritsar District, Lahore District, Montgomery District, and Lyallpur District in 1920 to account for the large population increase in the region, primarily due to the Chenab Canal Colony.)	—N/a	—N/a	—N/a	—N/a	—N/a	—N/a	23,431	4.48%	49,266	7.07%	60,054	7.04%
Total Christians	12,992	0.16%	42,371	0.41%	144,514	1.3%	247,030	2.08%	324,730	2.31%	395,311	2.28%
Total population	7,942,399	100%	10,427,765	100%	11,104,585	100%	11,888,985	100%	14,040,798	100%	17,350,103	100%

== Notable people ==
- Sunita Marshall, actress
- Sidra Sadaf, cyclist
- Group Captain Cecil Chaudhry, academic, activist, and fighter pilot for the Pakistan Air Force
- Nazir Latif, former Air Commodore of Pakistan Air Force
- Shahbaz Bhatti, former member of Pakistan National Assembly, and Pakistan Peoples Party
- Bishop Anthony Theodore Lobo, former minister of the Pakistan Roman Catholic Church
- Bishop Lawrence Saldanha, Archbishop
- Major General Julian Peter, former Major-General of Pakistan Army
- Reverend Samuel Azariah, bishop of the Church of Pakistan
- Nirmal Roy, singer
- Shazia Hidayat, athlete
- Bohemia (rapper), Pakistani-American rapper born Roger David

== Christian denominations in the province ==
- Anglican Catholic Church
- Associate Reformed Presbyterian Church in Pakistan
- Church of Pakistan
- Presbyterian Church of Pakistan
- United Presbyterian Church of Pakistan
- Full Gospel Assemblies of Pakistan
- New Apostolic Church in Pakistan
- Roman Catholic Church
- Old Catholic Church in Pakistan

== See also ==
- Punjabi Christians
- Christianity in Pakistan
- Freedom of religion in Pakistan
- Christian Medical College Ludhiana
- St. Thomas' High School, Jhelum
- Presentation Convent School, Jhelum
- Forman Christian College
