= Christianity in Pakistan =

Pakistani Christians
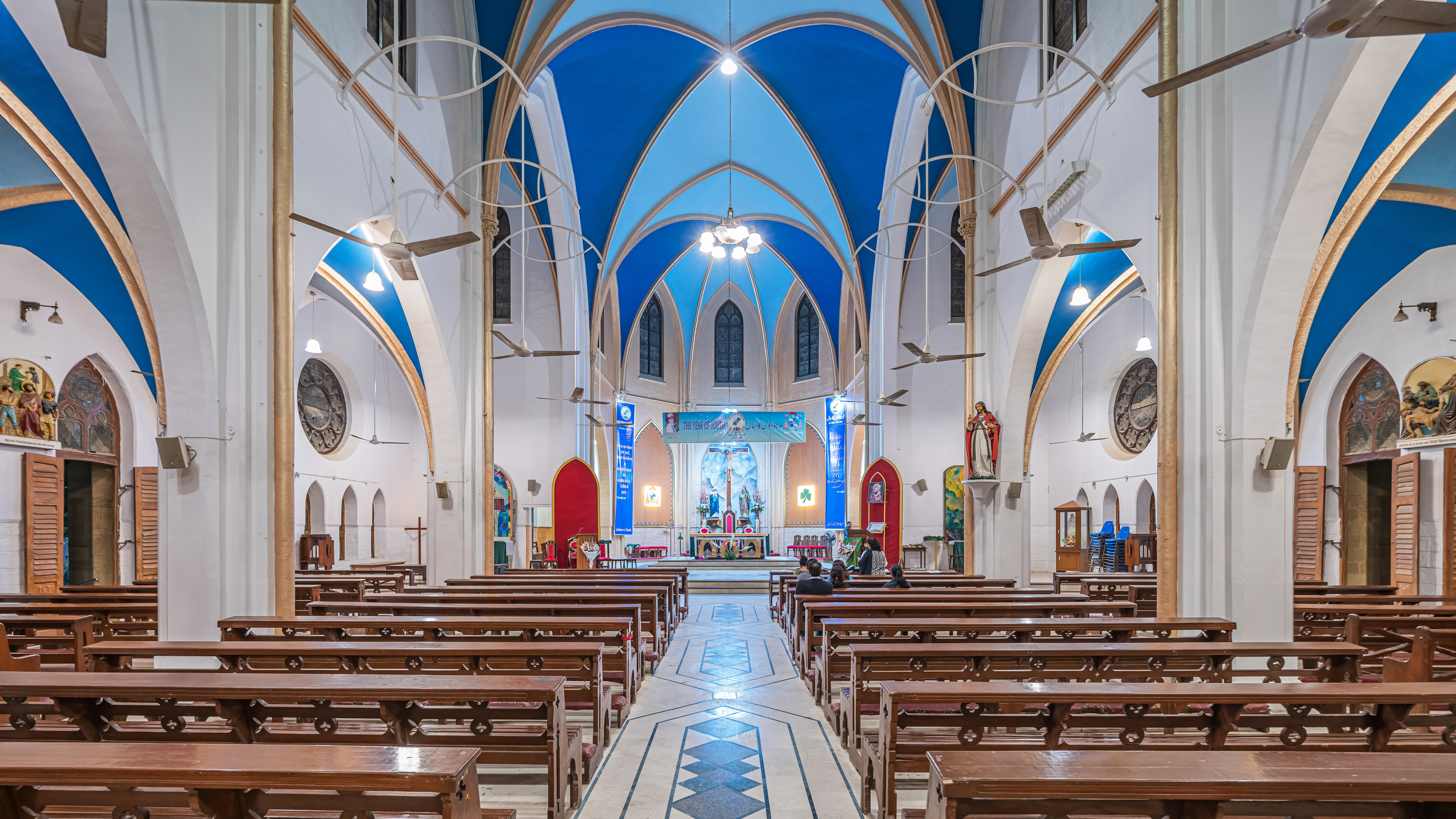
- Interior of Saint Patrick's Cathedral, Karachi

Total population
- ▲3,300,788 – 1.37% ▲ (2023)

Regions with significant populations
- Punjab: 2,458,924 – 1.93%
- Sindh: 546,968 – 0.98%
- Islamabad Capital Territory: 97,281 – 4.26%

Languages
- Punjabi; Urdu; English

Christianity is the third-largest religion in Pakistan, with the 2023 Census recording over three million Christians, or 1.37% of the total population in Pakistan. A majority of 90-95% Pakistani Christians are Dalits from the Chuhra caste who converted from Hinduism or from Mazhabi Sikh community. The province of Punjab has the largest population of Christians in the country, while Islamabad Capital Territory (4.26%) has the highest Christian percentage. The majority of Pakistan's Christians are members of the Catholic Church or the Church of Pakistan, with the remainder belonging to other Protestant groups.

Around 75 percent of Pakistan's Christians are rural Punjabi Christians, while some speak Sindhi and Gujarati, with the remainder being the upper and middle class Goan Christians and Anglo-Indians.

== Punjabi Christians ==
Punjabi Christians are mainly Dalit Christians, descendants of lower-caste Hindus who converted during the colonial era in India. Their socio-economic conditions facilitate religious discrimination. Blasphemy allegations have led to several cases of mob violence against Christian households and churches.

== History ==
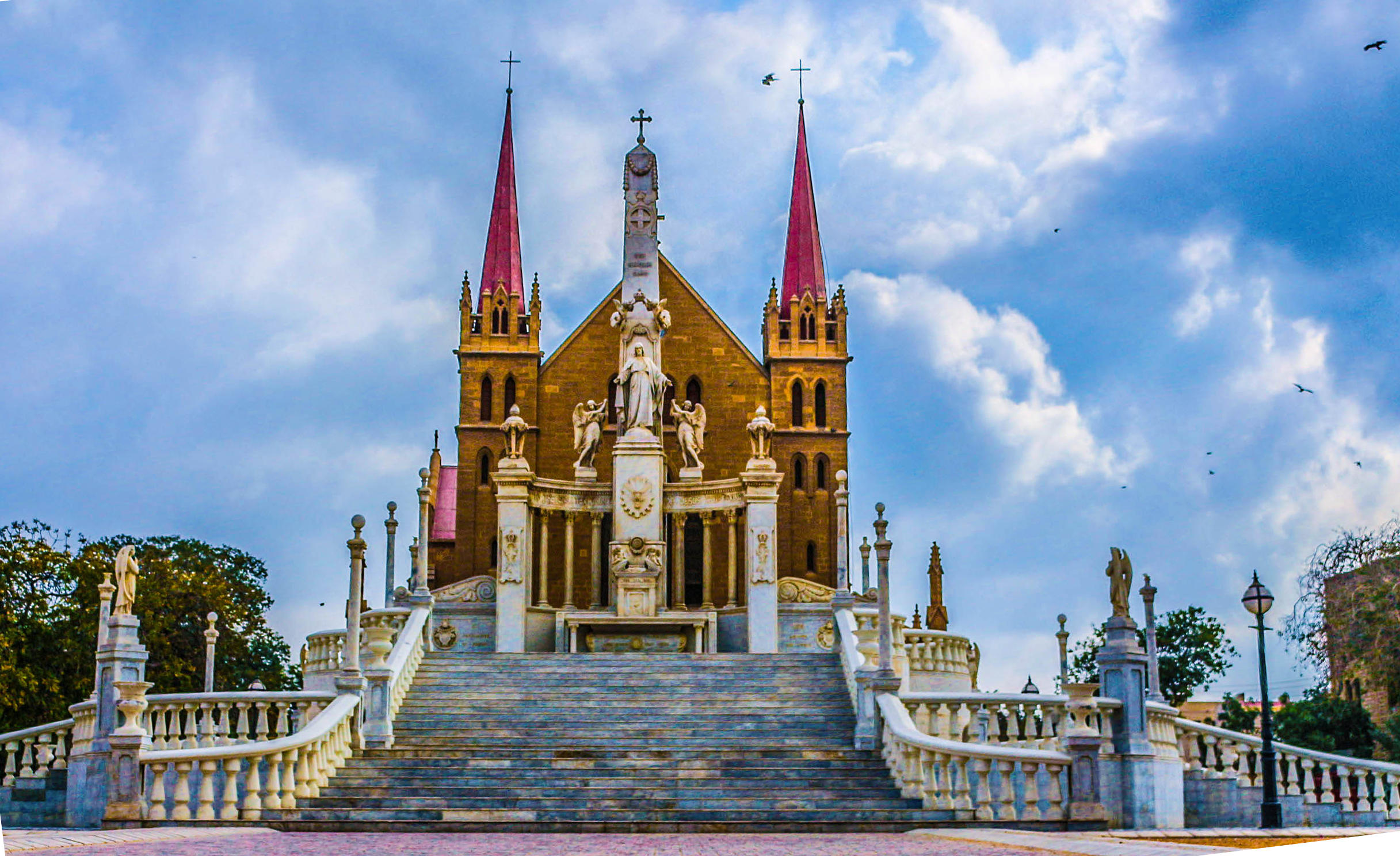
St Patrick's Cathedral Karachi

In 1935, a very small cross was found near Taxila, which some experts considers as St Thomas Cross. However, many experts denies this as the cross found doesnt share much characteristic with the St Thomas crosses. They also claim that the cross found is a pre-Christian Buddhist crosses or a Swastika-variants which is found in the Gandhara region.

In 1745, the Bettiah Christians, the northern Indian subcontinent's oldest surviving Christian community, were established by the Order of Friars Minor Capuchin under the patronage of King Dhurup Singh; the Hindustan Prefecture was raised in 1769 at Patna and later shifted to Agra, which was elevated to the status of a Vicariate in 1820. The Capuchins, through their Agra Diocese and Allahabad Diocese, expanded their ministry and established in the 1800s Catholic churches in colonial India's northern provinces including Rajasthan, UP, CP, Bihar and Punjab, the latter of which now includes Pakistan.

In 1877, on Saint Thomas' Day at Westminster Abbey, London, Rev. Thomas Valpy French was appointed the first Anglican Bishop of Lahore, a large diocese of the Church of India, Burma and Ceylon, which included all of the Punjab, then under British rule in colonial India, and remained so until 1887; during this period he also opened the Divinity College, Lahore in 1870. Rev. Thomas Patrick Hughes served as a Church Missionary Society missionary at Peshawar (1864–84), and became an oriental scholar, and compiled a 'Dictionary of Islam' (1885).

=== Independence movement ===
The Christians of colonial India were active in the Indian National Congress and the wider Indian independence movement, being collectively represented by the All India Conference of Indian Christians (AICIC), which advocated for swaraj and opposition to India's partition. The meeting of the AICIC in Lahore in December 1922, which had a large attendance of Punjabis, resolved that clergymen of the Church in India should be drawn from the ranks of Indians, rather than foreigners. The AICIC also stated that Indian Christians would not tolerate any discrimination based on race or skin colour.

Following the death of K. T. Paul of Salem, the principal of Forman Christian College in Lahore S. K. Datta became the president of the AICIC, representing the Indian Christian community at the Second Round Table Conference, where he agreed with Mahatma Gandhi's views on minorities and Depressed Classes. On 30 October 1945, the AICIC formed a joint committee with the Catholic Union of India that passed a resolution stating: "In the future constitution of India, the profession, practice and propagation of religion should be guaranteed and that a change of religion should not involve any civil or political disability."

This joint committee enabled the Christians in colonial India to stand united, and in front of the British Parliamentary Delegation "the committee members unanimously supported the move for independence and expressed complete confidence in the future of the community in India." The office for this joint committee was opened in Delhi, Vice-Chancellor of Andhra University M. Rahnasamy served as president and B.L. Rallia Ram of Lahore served as General Secretary. Six members of the joint committee were elected to the Minorities Committee of the Constituent Assembly. On 16-17 April 1947, a AICIC and Catholic Union of India committee prepared a 13-point memorandum that was forwarded to the Constituent Assembly of India, calling for religious freedom for both organisations and individuals.

=== Post Pakistan Independence ===
When Pakistan was created on 14 August 1947, the organization and activities of the Christian community changed drastically; the Catholic Union of India granted independence to its branches in Sindh and Balochistan in its Second Annual General Meeting in Bangalore in October 1947. Some Christians in Punjab and Sindh had been quite active after 1945 in their support for Muhammad Ali Jinnah's Muslim League. A few Indian Christians like Pothan Joseph had rendered valuable services as journalists and supporters of the All India Muslim League.

Jinnah's repeated promise that all citizens of Pakistan have complete equality of citizenship was disregarded by his successors. Pakistan became an Islamic Republic in 1956, making Islam the source of legislation and cornerstone of the national identity, while guaranteeing freedom of religion and equal citizenship to all citizens. In the mass population exchanges that occurred between Pakistan and India upon independence due to conflict between Muslims and followers of Indian religions, most Hindus and nearly all Sikhs fled the country. Pakistani Punjab is now over 2% Christian, with very few Hindus and Sikhs left.

Christians have made contributions to Pakistan society. Pakistan's first non-Muslim Chief Justice of the Pakistan Supreme Court was Justice A. R. Cornelius. Pakistani Christians also distinguished themselves as great fighter pilots in the Pakistan Air Force. Notable other Christians are Cecil Chaudhry, Peter O'Reilly and Mervyn L Middlecoat. Christians have also contributed as educators, doctors, lawyers and businessmen. One of Pakistan's well-known cricketers, Yousuf Youhana, was born Christian but later converted to Islam, taking the Islamic name Mohammad Yousuf. In Britain, the Bishop Emeritus of Rochester, Michael Nazir-Ali, is a Pakistani Christian.

In 2016, it was reported that Pakistan Electronic Media Regulatory Authority (PEMRA) had banned all of the Christian television stations. PEMRA doesn't allow broadcasting rights for religious content, allowing airing of Christian messages only on Easter and Christmas.

Since 1996, the small community of Eastern Orthodox Christians in Pakistan was placed under the ecclesiastical jurisdiction of the newly formed Orthodox Metropolitanate of Hong Kong and Southeast Asia that was set up by the decision of the Holy Synod of the Ecumenical Patriarchate of Constantinople. In 2008, the Diocese was divided, and Pakistan came under the jurisdiction of newly formed Eastern Orthodox Metropolitanate of Singapore and South Asia.

Since 2020, a community of The Old Catholic Church is also serving the Christians in Pakistan. On November 20, 2020, first Pakistani Bishop of The Old Catholic Church, was consecrated and elevated to the Archbishop of the first Archdiocese of The Old Catholic Church in Pakistan.

=== Deterioration of relations ===
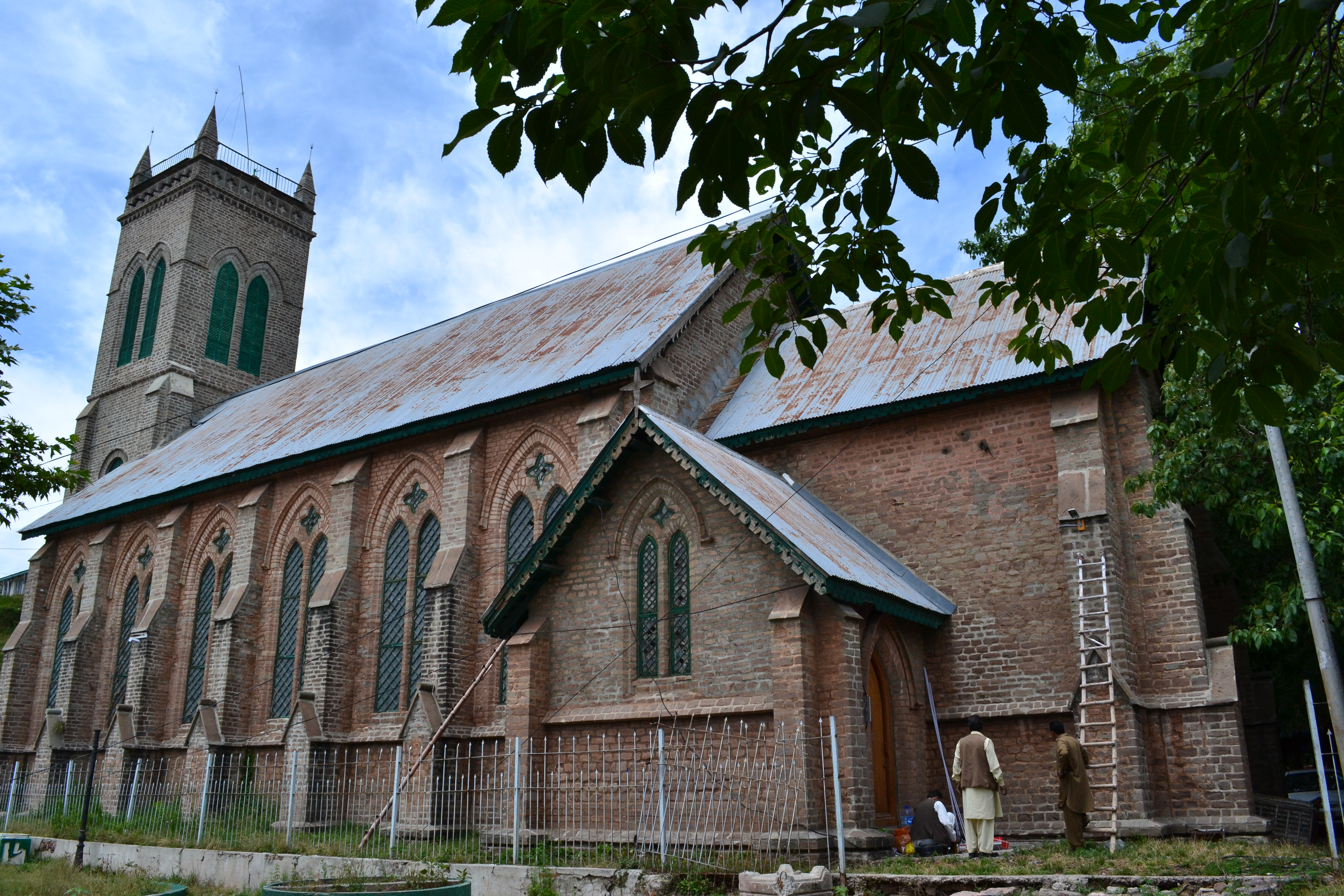
Holy Trinity Church Murree

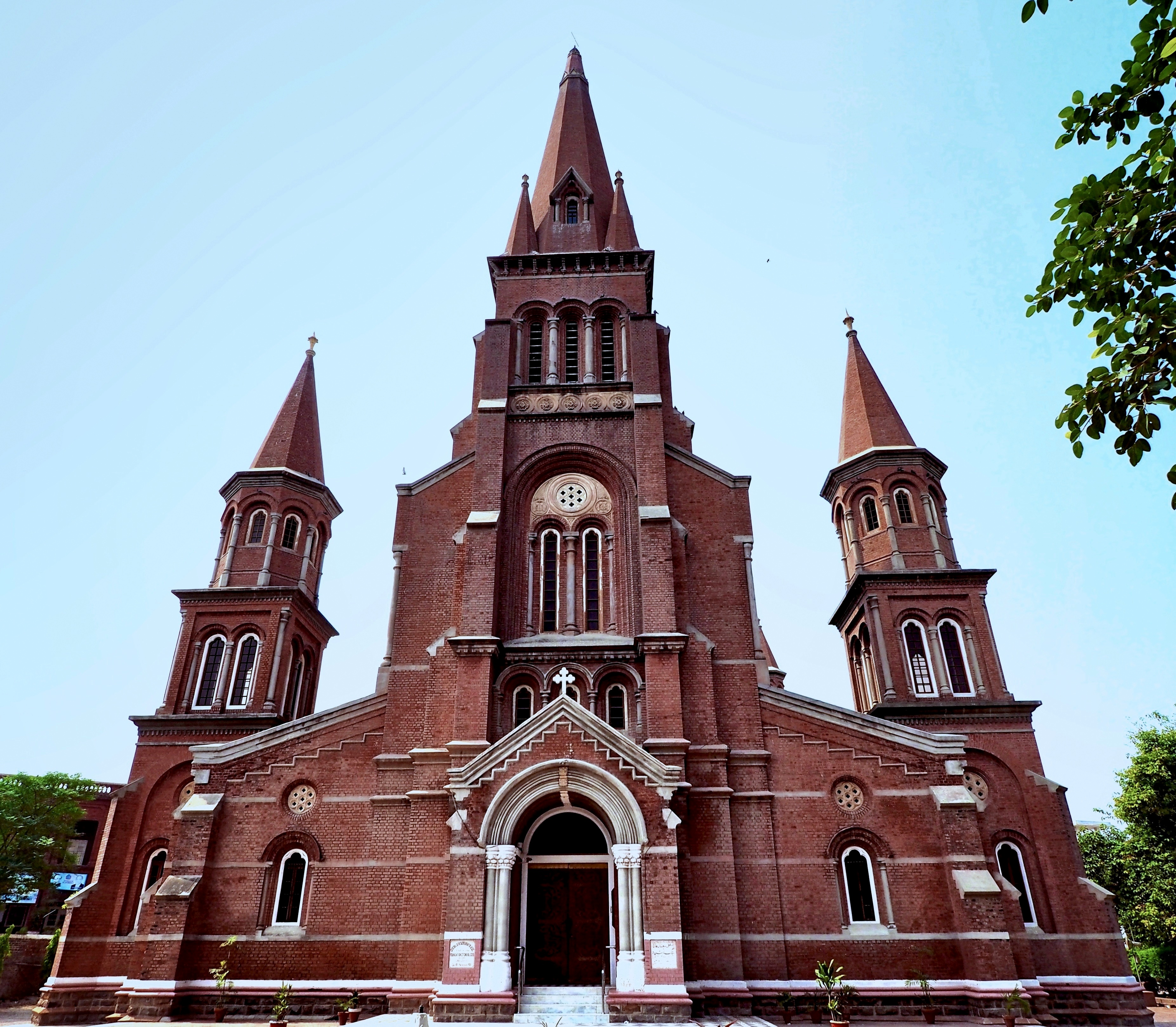
Sacred Heart Cathedral, Lahore

According to journalist Pamela Constable, in the 1980s and 1990s tensions between Christians and Muslims in Pakistan began to "fester". Constable credits the Soviet war in Afghanistan, the rise of military dictator General Mohammed Zia ul-Haq and the influence of stricter religious teachings from the Gulf states as catalysts for the change. After the 9/11 attacks on the US, things grew worse, with many Pakistani Muslims seeing the American response to the attacks "as a foreign plot to defame their faith."

Pakistan's Christian community developed a "growing sense of concern", particularly over the strict blasphemy laws, that prohibit any insults against Muhammad and make the crime punishable by death. In the 1990s, some Christians were arrested on charges of blasphemy, and for protesting that appeared to insult Islam. John Joseph, the Catholic Bishop of Faisalabad, committed suicide to protest the execution of a Christian man on blasphemy charges.

In 2009, a series of attacks killed eight Christians in Gojra, four women, three men and a child. In 2013, a suicide bombing at a church in Peshawar left more than 100 people dead, and a series of attacks at churches in Lahore in 2015 left 14 dead. On 27 March 2016, over seventy people, mostly Muslims, were killed when a suicide bomber targeting Christians celebrating Easter attacked a playground in Lahore.

On 16 August 2023, rumours began to spread in the Punjabi city of Jaranwala, Faisalabad, that a Christian had desecrated pages of the Quran. The resulting riot led to the destruction of 26 churches in the Christian quarter of the city, and thousands of Christians fled, with some spending the next few nights in open fields, afraid of returning to their homes. Local Christians complained of inaction by security forces in Jaranwala, but eventually reinforcements were called in and around 100 Muslims were arrested for participating in the violence. No Christians were killed in the riots, as most managed to flee due to warnings from Muslim neighbours.

On the Sunday after the riots, Mass was celebrated in the street outside the burned-out St. Paul's Catholic Church. The Pakistani Catholic Bishops' Conference denounced the act and asked that the Government bring the culprits to justice, regretting that "the Christian community has been terrorized and frightened by a small group of miscreants to make them believe that Christians are in fact second-class citizens of Pakistan and will remain so". Catholic charity Aid to the Church in Need helped address the emergency needs of those whose livelihoods was destroyed, providing a support package for 464 families, including replacement rickshaws and motorcycles for drivers who had lost their vehicles.

== Demographics ==
Christian population in Pakistan
Year	Pop.	±% p.a.
1901	59,387	—
1911	167,178	+10.90%
1921	276,107	+5.15%
1931	360,371	+2.70%
1941	432,724	+1.85%
1951	432,978	+0.01%
1961	583,884	+3.04%
1972	907,861	+4.09%
1981	1,310,426	+4.16%
1990	1,769,582	+3.39%
1998	2,092,902	+2.12%
2017	2,642,048	+1.23%
2023	3,300,788	+3.78%

Christianity in Pakistan is growing fast, going from 1.27% in 2017 to 1.37% in 2023, making it one of the religions in Pakistan growing faster than Islam, alongside Hinduism. Today, most Pakistani Christians live in Northern Punjab.

Apart from Catholics, Christians of other denominations re-organized themselves, in India, into the Churches of North and South India respectively, and as the Church of Pakistan in 1970. Politically, groups like the Pakistan Christian Congress have arisen. The New Apostolic Church also has followers in Pakistan.

The Church of Jesus Christ of Latter-day Saints (LDS Church) reports over 4,000 members in 13 congregations throughout Pakistan. LDS members are most prevalent in Islamabad, Lahore and Karachi.

According to a Minority Rights Group International report published in 2002, the average literacy rate among Christians in Pakistan was 34 percent compared to the national average of 46.56 percent.

=== 1901 census ===
According to the 1901 census, the Christian population in Pakistan comprised roughly 59,387 persons or 0.3 percent of the total population. (Note: 1901 figure taken from census data by combining the total population of all administrative divisions that compose the region of contemporary Pakistan, including Punjab, (Note: 1901 figure taken from census data by combining the total population of all districts (Lahore, Sialkot, Gujranwala, Gujrat, Shahpur, Jhelum, Rawalpindi, Mianwali, Montgomery, Lyallpur (inscribed as the Chenab Colony on the 1901 census), Jhang, Multan, Muzaffargargh, Dera Ghazi Khan), one tehsil (Shakargarh – then part of Gurdaspur District), one princely state (Bahawalpur), and one tract (Biloch Trans–Frontier) in Punjab Province, British India that ultimately fell on the western side of the Radcliffe Line. See 1901 census data here: Immediately following the partition of India in 1947, these districts and tract would ultimately make up the subdivision of West Punjab, which also later included Bahawalpur. The state that makes up this region in the contemporary era is Punjab, Pakistan.) Sindh, (Note: 1901 figure taken from census data by combining the total population of all districts (Karachi, Hyderabad, Shikarpur, Tharparkar, Upper Sind Frontier), and one princely state (Khairpur), in Sindh Province, British India. See 1901 census data here:) Khyber Pakhtunkhwa, Balochistan, Azad Jammu and Kashmir, (Note: 1901 figure taken from census data by combining the total population of two districts (Bhimber and Muzaffarabad) and one Jagir (Poonch) in the Princely State of Jammu and Kashmir that ultimately would be administered by Pakistan, in the contemporary self-administrative territory of Azad Jammu and Kashmir. See 1901 census data here:) and Gilgit–Baltistan. (Note: 1901 figure taken from census data using the total population of Gilgit District in the Princely State of Jammu and Kashmir that ultimately would be administered by Pakistan, in the contemporary administrative territory of Gilgit–Baltistan. See 1901 census data here:)) With the exception of the Federally Administered Tribal Areas, all administrative divisions in the region that composes contemporary Pakistan collected religious data, with a combined population of 17,633,258, for an overall response rate of 99.6 percent out of the total population of 17,708,014, as detailed in the table below.

Christianity in Pakistan by administrative division in 1901
Administrative division	1901 census			
Administrative division	Christian Population	Christian Percentage	Total Responses	Total Population
Punjab	42,371	0.41%	10,427,765	10,427,765
Sindh	7,825	0.23%	3,410,223	3,410,223
Khyber Pakhtunkhwa	5,119	0.25%	2,050,724 (Note: Religious data only collected in North West Frontier Province, and not in the Federally Administered Tribal Areas. Total responses to religion includes North West Frontier Province, and total population includes both North West Frontier Province and the Federally Administered Tribal Areas, both administrative divisions which later amalgamated to become Khyber Pakhtunkhwa.)	2,125,480
Balochistan	4,026	0.5%	810,746	810,746
Gilgit–Baltistan	28	0.05%	60,885	60,885
AJK	18	0%	872,915	872,915
Pakistan	59,387	0.34%	17,633,258	17,708,014

=== 1911 census ===
According to the 1911 census, the Christian population in Pakistan comprised roughly 167,178 persons or 0.9 percent of the total population. (Note: 1911 figure taken from census data by combining the total population of all administrative divisions that compose the region of contemporary Pakistan, including Punjab, (Note: 1911 figure taken from census data by combining the total population of all districts (Lahore, Sialkot, Gujranwala, Gujrat, Shahpur, Jhelum, Rawalpindi, Attock, Mianwali, Montgomery, Lyallpur, Jhang, Multan, Muzaffargargh, Dera Ghazi Khan), one tehsil (Shakargarh – then part of Gurdaspur District), one princely state (Bahawalpur), and one tract (Biloch Trans–Frontier) in Punjab Province, British India that ultimately fell on the western side of the Radcliffe Line. See 1911 census data here: Immediately following the partition of India in 1947, these districts and tract would ultimately make up the subdivision of West Punjab, which also later included Bahawalpur. The state that makes up this region in the contemporary era is Punjab, Pakistan.) Sindh, (Note: 1911 figure taken from census data by combining the total population of all districts (Hyderabad, Karachi, Larkana, Sukkur, Tharparkar, Upper Sind Frontier), and one princely state (Khairpur), in Sindh Province, British India. See 1911 census data here:) Khyber Pakhtunkhwa, Balochistan, Azad Jammu and Kashmir, (Note: 1911 figure taken from census data by combining the total population of two districts (Mirpur and Muzaffarabad) and one Jagir (Poonch) in the Princely State of Jammu and Kashmir that ultimately would be administered by Pakistan, in the contemporary self-administrative territory of Azad Jammu and Kashmir. See 1911 census data here:) and Gilgit–Baltistan. (Note: 1911 figure taken from census data by combining the total population of Gilgit District and the Frontier Ilaqas in the Princely State of Jammu and Kashmir that ultimately would be administered by Pakistan, in the contemporary administrative territory of Gilgit–Baltistan. See 1911 census data here:)) With the exception of the Federally Administered Tribal Areas, all administrative divisions in the region that composes contemporary Pakistan collected religious data, with a combined population of 18,806,379, for an overall response rate of 92.1 percent out of the total population of 20,428,473, as detailed in the table below.

Christianity in Pakistan by administrative division in 1911
Administrative division	1911 census			
Administrative division	Christian Population	Christian Percentage	Total Responses	Total Population
Punjab	144,514	1.3%	11,104,585	11,104,585
Sindh	10,917	0.29%	3,737,223	3,737,223
Khyber Pakhtunkhwa	6,585	0.3%	2,196,933	3,819,027
Balochistan	5,085	0.61%	834,703	834,703
AJK	55	0.01%	854,531	854,531
Gilgit–Baltistan	22	0.03%	78,404	78,404
Pakistan	167,178	0.89%	18,806,379	20,428,473

=== 1921 census ===
According to the 1921 census, the Christian population in Pakistan comprised roughly 276,107 persons or 1.4 percent of the total population. (Note: 1921 figure taken from census data by combining the total population of all administrative divisions that compose the region of contemporary Pakistan, including Punjab, (Note: 1921 figure taken from census data by combining the total population of all districts (Lahore, Sialkot, Gujranwala, Sheikhupura, Gujrat, Shahpur, Jhelum, Rawalpindi, Attock, Mianwali, Montgomery, Lyallpur, Jhang, Multan, Muzaffargargh, Dera Ghazi Khan), one tehsil (Shakargarh – then part of Gurdaspur District), one princely state (Bahawalpur), and one tract (Biloch Trans–Frontier) in Punjab Province, British India that ultimately fell on the western side of the Radcliffe Line. See 1921 census data here: Immediately following the partition of India in 1947, these districts and tract would ultimately make up the subdivision of West Punjab, which also later included Bahawalpur. The state that makes up this region in the contemporary era is Punjab, Pakistan.) Sindh, (Note: 1921 figure taken from census data by combining the total population of all districts (Hyderabad, Karachi, Larkana, Nawabshah, Sukkur, Tharparkar, Upper Sind Frontier), and one princely state (Khairpur), in Sindh Province, British India. See 1921 census data here:) Khyber Pakhtunkhwa, Balochistan, Azad Jammu and Kashmir, (Note: 1921 figure taken from census data by combining the total population of two districts (Mirpur and Muzaffarabad) and one Jagir (Poonch) in the Princely State of Jammu and Kashmir that ultimately would be administered by Pakistan, in the contemporary self-administrative territory of Azad Jammu and Kashmir. See 1921 census data here:) and Gilgit–Baltistan. (Note: 1921 figure taken from census data by combining the total population of Gilgit District and the Frontier Ilaqas in the Princely State of Jammu and Kashmir that ultimately would be administered by Pakistan, in the contemporary administrative territory of Gilgit–Baltistan. See 1921 census data here:)) With the exception of the Federally Administered Tribal Areas, all administrative divisions in the region that composes contemporary Pakistan collected religious data, with a combined population of 19,389,016, for an overall response rate of 87.3 percent out of the total population of 22,214,152, as detailed in the table below.

Christianity in Pakistan by administrative division in 1921
Administrative division	1921 census			
Administrative division	Christian Population	Christian Percentage	Total Responses	Total Population
Punjab	247,030	2.08%	11,888,985	11,888,985
Sindh	11,734	0.34%	3,472,508	3,472,508
Khyber Pakhtunkhwa	10,610	0.47%	2,251,340	5,076,476
Balochistan	6,693	0.84%	799,625	799,625
AJK	24	0%	886,861	886,861
Gilgit–Baltistan	16	0.02%	89,697	89,697
Pakistan	276,107	1.42%	19,389,016	22,214,152

=== 1931 census ===
According to the 1931 census, the Christian population in Pakistan comprised roughly 360,371 persons or 1.6 percent of the total population. (Note: 1931 figure taken from census data by combining the total population of all administrative divisions that compose the region of contemporary Pakistan, including Punjab, (Note: 1931 figure taken from census data by combining the total population of all districts (Lahore, Sialkot, Gujranwala, Sheikhupura, Gujrat, Shahpur, Jhelum, Rawalpindi, Attock, Mianwali, Montgomery, Lyallpur, Jhang, Multan, Muzaffargargh, Dera Ghazi Khan), one tehsil (Shakargarh – then part of Gurdaspur District), one princely state (Bahawalpur), and one tract (Biloch Trans–Frontier) in Punjab Province, British India that ultimately fell on the western side of the Radcliffe Line. See 1931 census data here: Immediately following the partition of India in 1947, these districts and tract would ultimately make up the subdivision of West Punjab, which also later included Bahawalpur. The state that makes up this region in the contemporary era is Punjab, Pakistan.) Sindh, (Note: 1931 figure taken from census data by combining the total population of all districts (Hyderabad, Karachi, Larkana, Nawabshah, Sukkur, Tharparkar, Upper Sind Frontier), and one princely state (Khairpur), in Sindh Province, British India. See 1931 census data here:) Khyber Pakhtunkhwa, Balochistan, Azad Jammu and Kashmir, (Note: 1941 figure taken from census data by combining the total population of two districts (Mirpur and Muzaffarabad) and one Jagir (Poonch) in the Princely State of Jammu and Kashmir that ultimately would be administered by Pakistan, in the contemporary self-administrative territory of Azad Jammu and Kashmir. See 1941 census data here:) and Gilgit–Baltistan. (Note: 1931 figure taken from census data by combining the total population of Gilgit District and the Frontier Ilaqas in the Princely State of Jammu and Kashmir that ultimately would be administered by Pakistan, in the contemporary administrative territory of Gilgit–Baltistan. See 1931 census data here:)) With the exception of the Federally Administered Tribal Areas, all administrative divisions in the region that composes contemporary Pakistan collected religious data, with a combined population of 22,514,768, for an overall response rate of 90.9 percent out of the total population of 24,774,056, as detailed in the table below.

Christianity in Pakistan by administrative division in 1931
Administrative division	1931 census			
Administrative division	Christian Population	Christian Percentage	Total Responses	Total Population
Punjab	324,730	2.31%	14,040,798	14,040,798
Sindh	15,152	0.37%	4,114,253	4,114,253
Khyber Pakhtunkhwa	12,213	0.5%	2,425,076	4,684,364
Balochistan	8,059	0.93%	868,617	868,617
AJK (Note: 1931 figure taken from census data by combining the total population of two districts (Mirpur and Muzaffarabad) and one Jagir (Poonch) in the Princely State of Jammu and Kashmir that ultimately would be administered by Pakistan, in the contemporary self-administrative territory of Azad Jammu and Kashmir. See 1931 census data here:)	168	0.02%	969,578	969,578
Gilgit–Baltistan	49	0.05%	96,446	96,446
Pakistan	360,371	1.6%	22,514,768	24,774,056

=== 1941 census ===
According to the 1941 census, the Christian population in Pakistan comprised roughly 432,724 persons or 1.6 percent of the total population. (Note: 1941 figure taken from census data by combining the total population of all administrative divisions that compose the region of contemporary Pakistan, including Punjab, (Note: 1941 figure taken from census data by combining the total population of all districts (Lahore, Sialkot, Gujranwala, Sheikhupura, Gujrat, Shahpur, Jhelum, Rawalpindi, Attock, Mianwali, Montgomery, Lyallpur, Jhang, Multan, Muzaffargargh, Dera Ghazi Khan), one tehsil (Shakargarh – then part of Gurdaspur District), one princely state (Bahawalpur), and one tract (Biloch Trans–Frontier) in Punjab Province, British India that ultimately fell on the western side of the Radcliffe Line. See 1941 census data here: Immediately following the partition of India in 1947, these districts and tract would ultimately make up the subdivision of West Punjab, which also later included Bahawalpur. The state that makes up this region in the contemporary era is Punjab, Pakistan.) Sindh, (Note: 1941 figure taken from census data by combining the total population of all districts (Dadu, Hyderabad, Karachi, Larkana, Nawabshah, Sukkur, Tharparkar, Upper Sind Frontier), and one princely state (Khairpur), in Sindh Province, British India. See 1941 census data here:) Khyber Pakhtunkhwa, Balochistan, Azad Jammu and Kashmir, and Gilgit–Baltistan. (Note: 1941 figure taken from census data by combining the total population of one district (Astore) and one agency (Gilgit) in the Princely State of Jammu and Kashmir that ultimately would be administered by Pakistan, in the contemporary administrative territory of Gilgit–Baltistan. See 1941 census data here:)) With the exception of the Federally Administered Tribal Areas, all administrative divisions in the region that compose contemporary Pakistan collected religious data, with a combined population of 27,266,001, for an overall response rate of 92.0 percent out of the total population of 29,643,600, as detailed in the table below.

Christianity in Pakistan by administrative division in 1941
Administrative division	1941 Census			
Administrative division	Christian Population	Christian Percentage	Total Responses	Total Population
Punjab	395,311	2.28%	17,350,103	17,350,103
Sindh	20,304	0.42%	4,840,795	4,840,795
Khyber Pakhtunkhwa	10,889	0.36%	3,038,067	5,415,666
Balochistan	6,056	0.71%	857,835	857,835
AJK	136	0.01%	1,073,154	1,073,154
Gilgit–Baltistan	28	0.02%	116,047	116,047
Pakistan	432,724	1.59%	27,266,001	29,643,600

=== 2023 census ===
According to the 2023 census, the Christian population in Pakistan comprised 3,300,788 persons or 1.4 percent of the total population.

Christianity in Pakistan by administrative division in 2023
Administrative division	2023 Pakistani census			
Administrative division	Christian Population	Christian Percentage	Total Responses	Total Population
Punjab	2,458,924	1.93%	127,333,305	127,688,922
Sindh	546,968	0.98%	55,638,409	55,696,147
Khyber Pakhtunkhwa	134,884	0.33%	40,641,120	40,856,097
Islamabad Capital Territory	97,281	4.26%	2,283,244	2,363,863
Balochistan	62,731	0.43%	14,562,011	14,894,402
Pakistan	3,300,788	1.37%	240,458,089	241,499,431

== Persecution ==
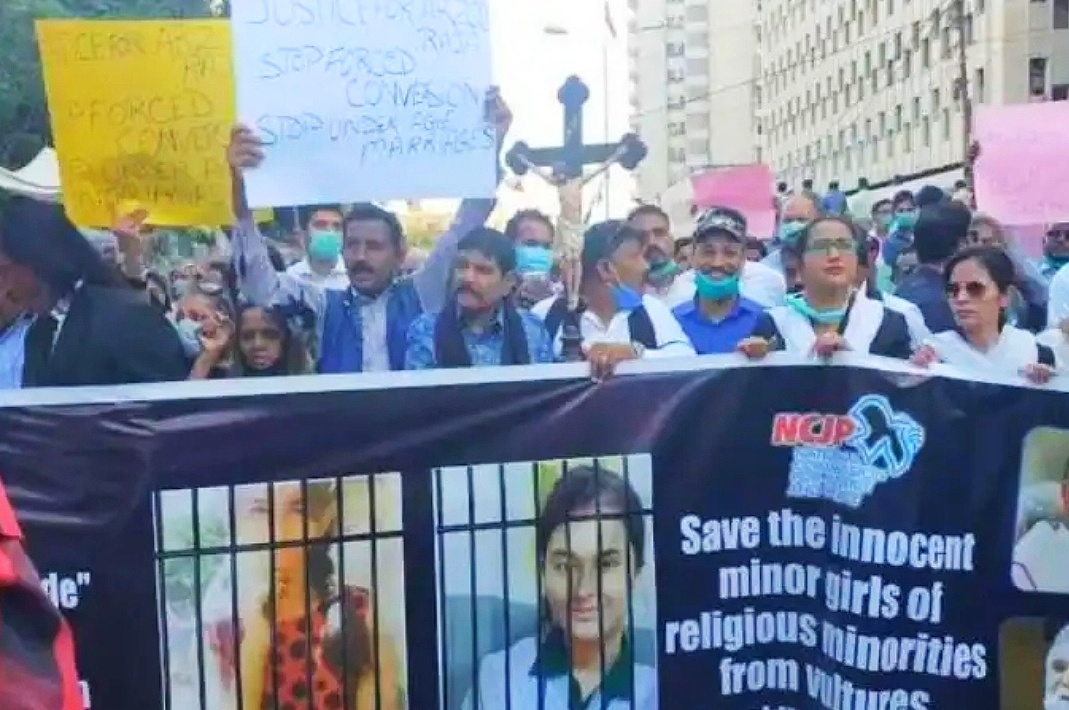
Protest against forced conversion of Christian girls in Pakistan organised by NCJP

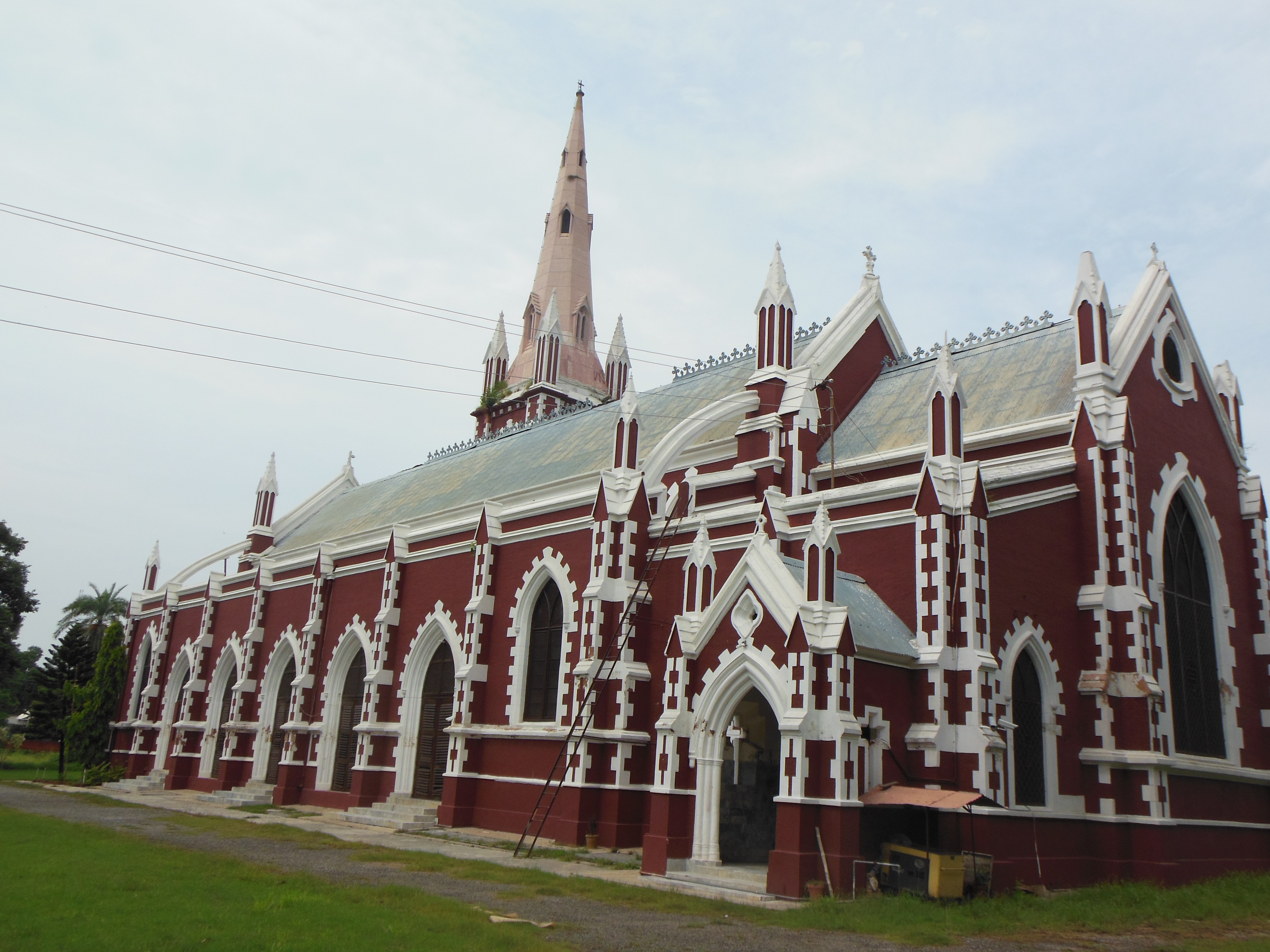
Outside of the Sialkot Cathedral

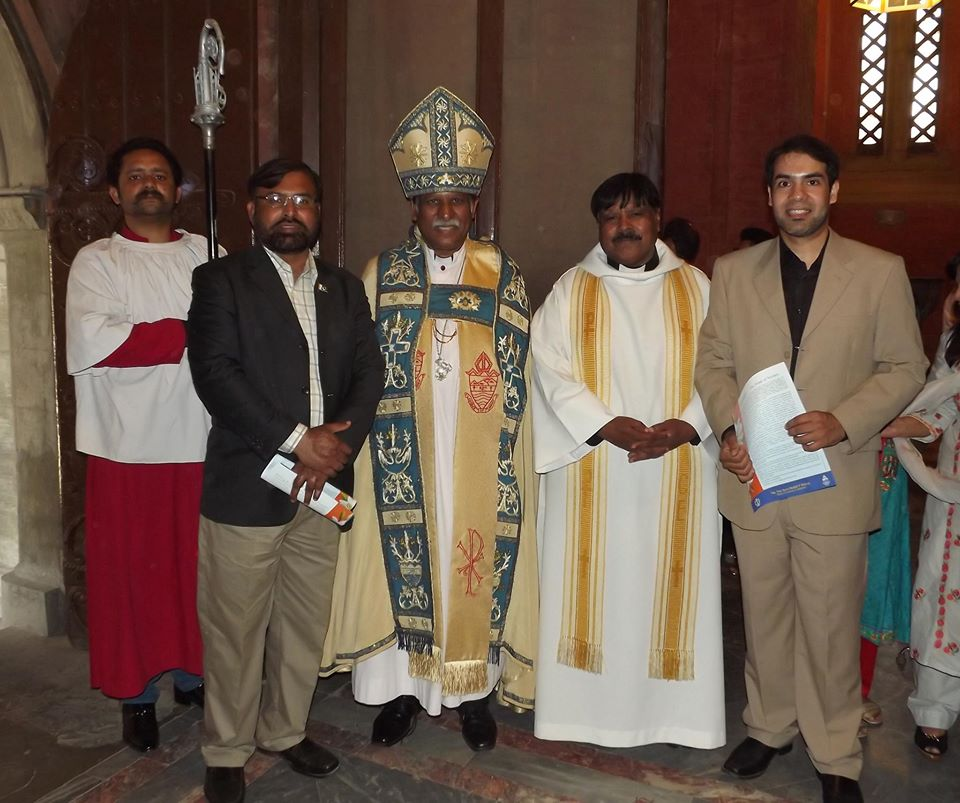
Easter Celebrations at Cathedral Church of the Resurrection, Lahore

After the partition of India and the formation of Pakistan in 1947, many Sikhs were forced to migrate to an independent India. Many Christians worked under Sikh landlords and when they departed the western parts of the Punjab region, the Government of Pakistan appropriated Sikh property to Muslims arriving from East Punjab. This caused over 300,000 Christians in Pakistan to become homeless. Christians faced judgement living in Pakistan, with local Muslims even stating that they had to live a life of servitude and perform sanitation work. Some Christians were therefore murdered for refusing to pick up garbage. In 1951, seventy-two Muslims were charged with the murder of eleven Christians after communal riots over agricultural land erupted.

Many churches built during the colonial Indian period, prior to the partition, remain locked, with the Pakistani government refusing to hand them over to the Christian community. Others have been victims of church arsons or demolitions. In 1971, East Pakistan became independent as Bangladesh, and the majority of Pakistan's Hindus, who lived in Bangladesh, were severed from Pakistan. Pakistan became a culturally monolithic, increasingly Islamic state, with smaller religious minorities than ever.

With the governments of Zulfikar Ali Bhutto and Zia ul-Haq, more stringently Islamic laws transformed Pakistan. Conversion to faiths other than Islam is not prohibited by law. Extremely controversial were the blasphemy laws, which made it treacherous for non-Muslims to express themselves without being accused of being un-Islamic. Zia also introduced the Sharia as a basis for lawmaking, reinforced by Nawaz Sharif in 1991. Coerced conversions to Islam from Christianity are a major source of concern for Pakistani Christians, and the minority faces threats, harassment and intimidation tactics from extremists. The Christian community in Pakistan encounters significant challenges, discrimination, and persecution solely based on their religious identity. The law enforcement and justice system, as well as the presence of "blasphemy" laws and bonded labor, are often exploited to target, trap, and imprison religious minorities, with a particular focus on Christians.

== Gallery ==
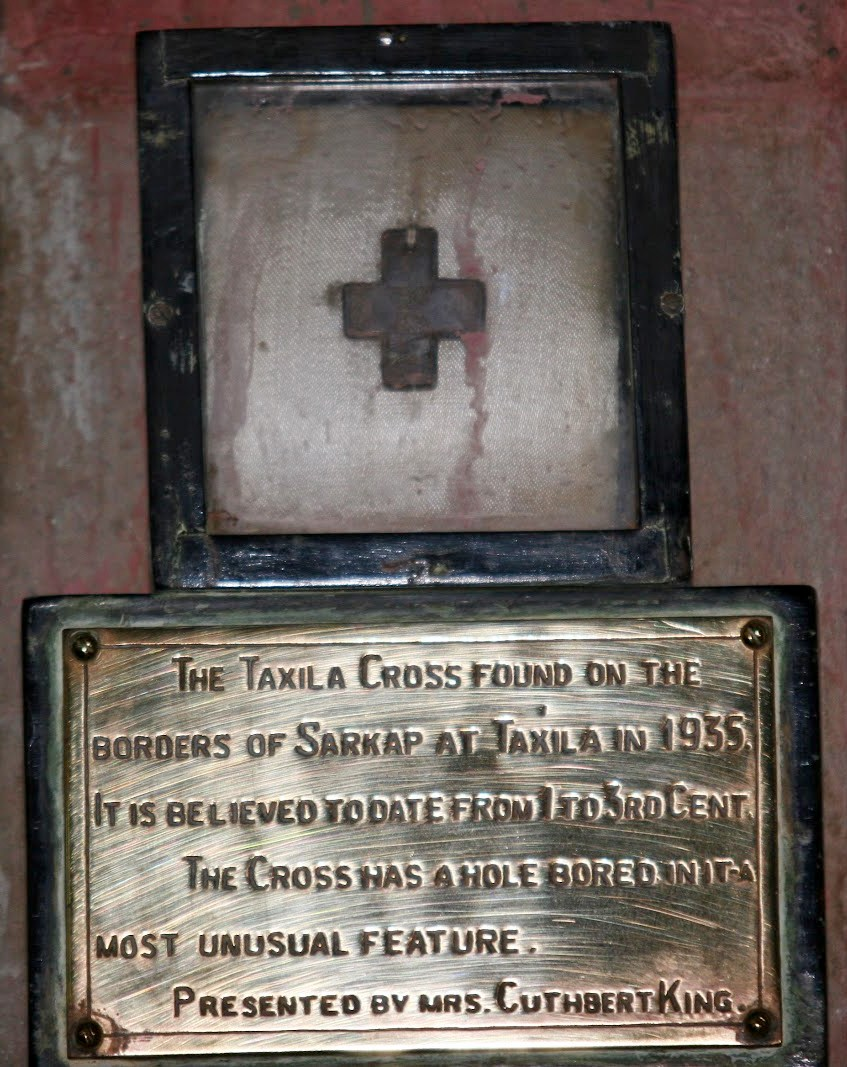
The Taxila Cross, discovered in 1935 at Sirkap near Taxila, is said to be one of the Saint Thomas Christian crosses (Mar Thoma Sleeva) that corresponds in shape to the one in Mylapore; it has been placed at Lahore Cathedral.

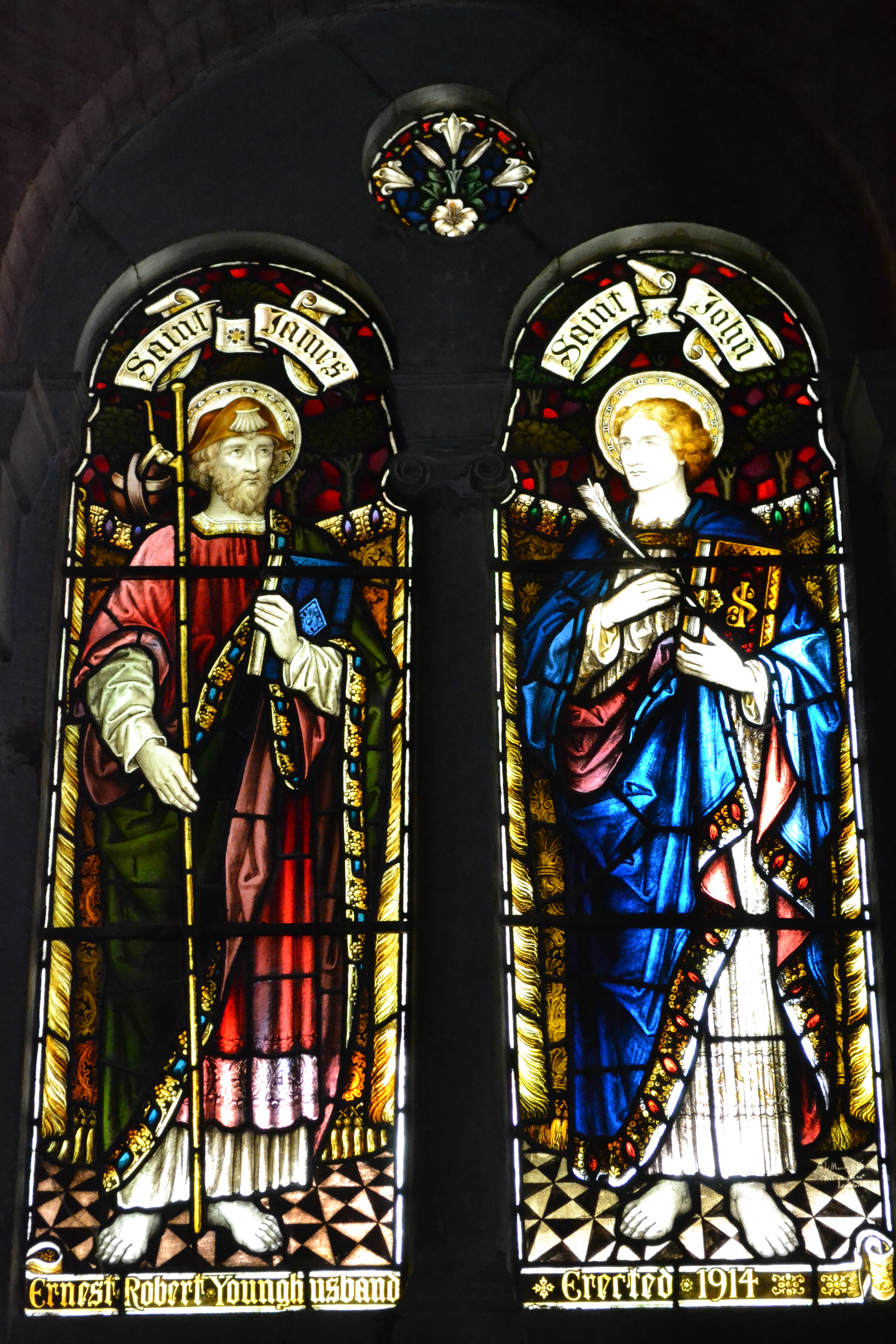
St Andrew Church Stained glass, Lahore

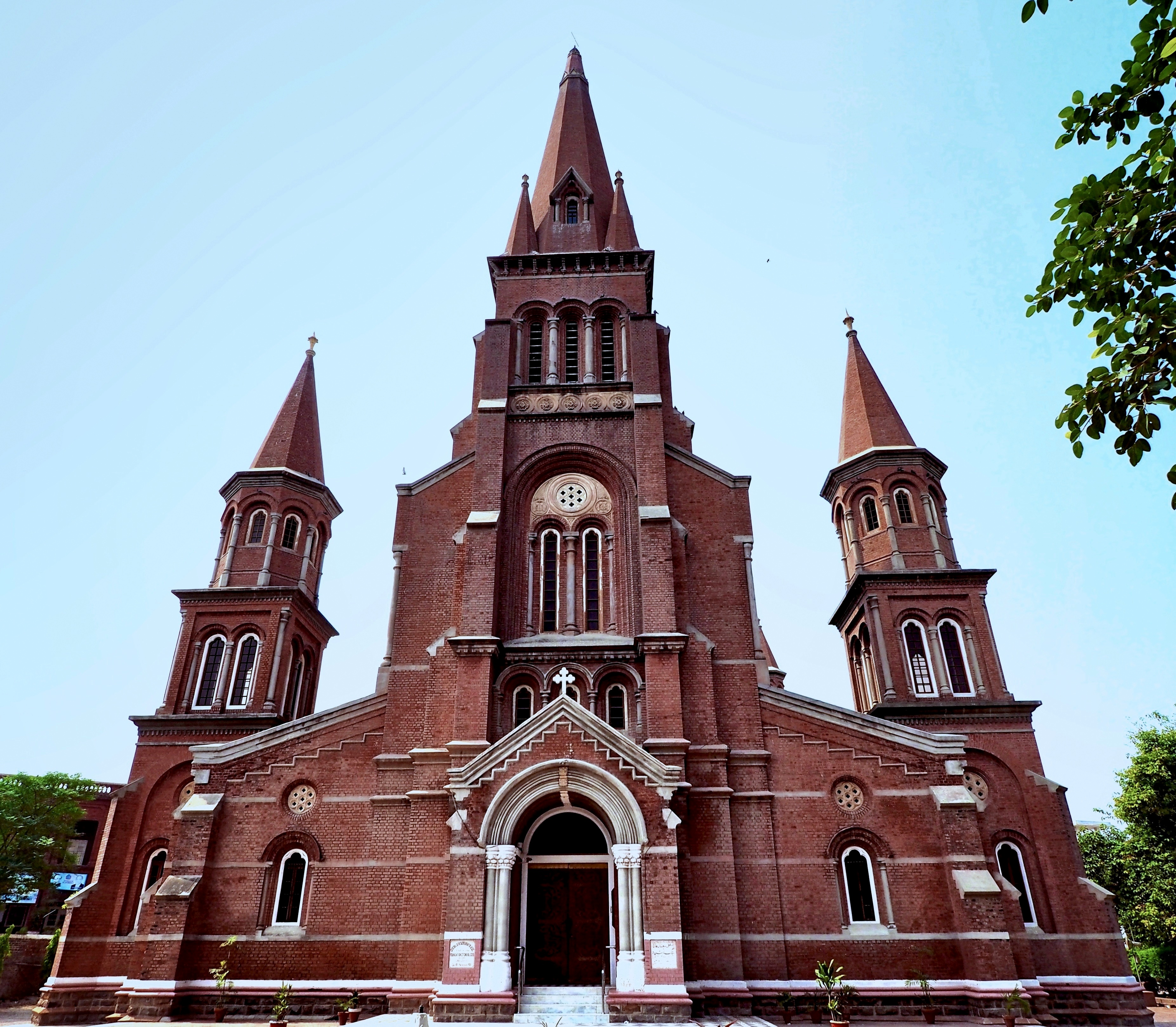
Sacred Heart Cathedral, Lahore

Missionaries accompanied colonizing forces from Portugal, France, and Great Britain. Jesuit missionaries sent from Portuguese-held Goa built a Catholic church in Lahore, the first in Punjab, around 1597, two years after being granted permission by emperor Akbar, who had called them to his court in Fatehpur Sikri for religious discussions. This church was later demolished, perhaps during Aurangzeb times. Later on, Christianity was mainly brought by the British rulers of India in the later 18th and 19th century. This is evidenced in cities established by the British, such as the port city of Karachi, where the majestic St. Patrick's Cathedral, one of Pakistan's largest churches, stands, and the churches in the city of Rawalpindi, where the British established a major military cantonment.

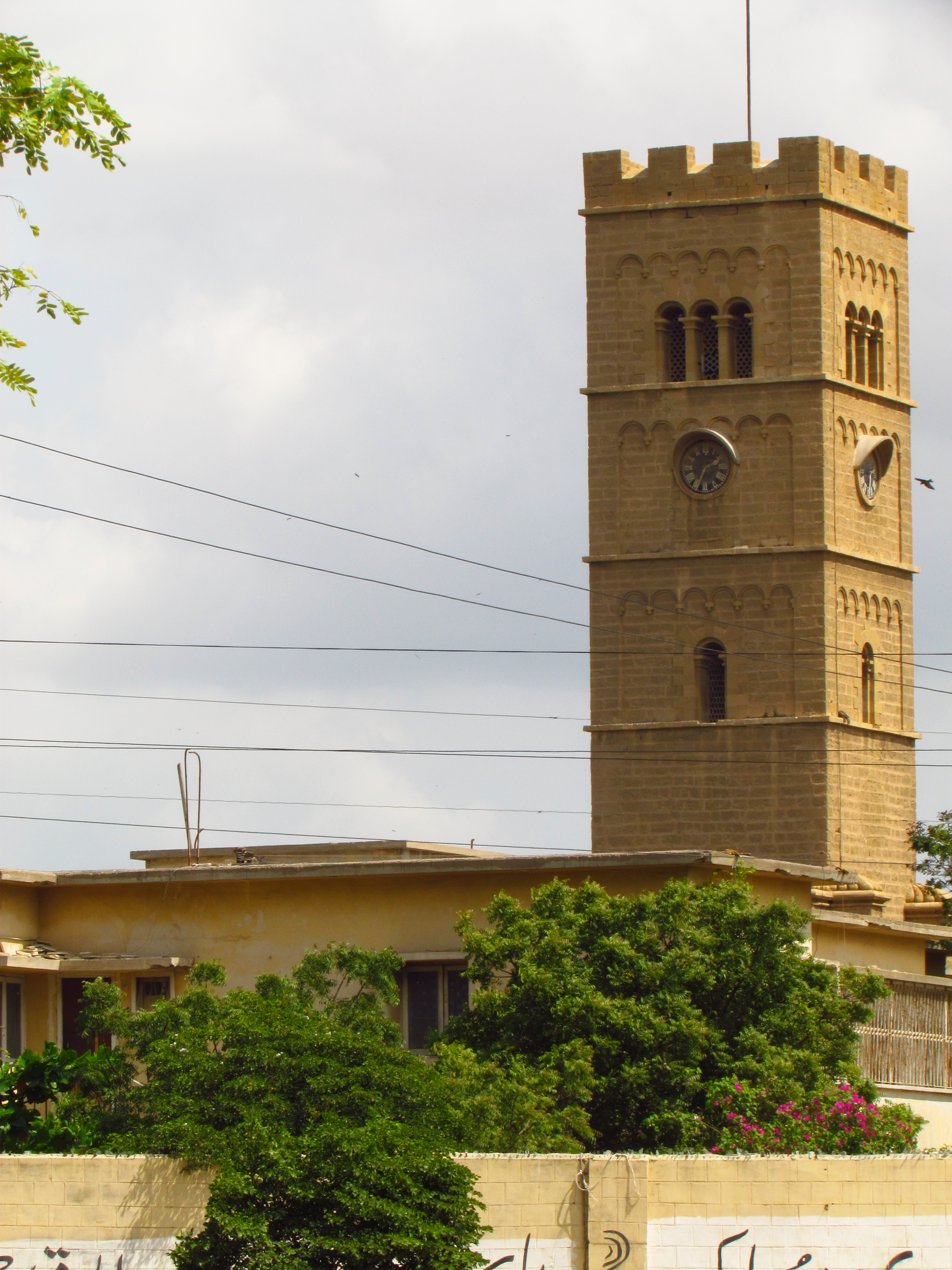
Holy Trinity Cathedral, Karachi

The Europeans won small numbers of converts to Anglicanism, Methodism, Lutheranism and Catholicism from the native populations. Islam was very strong in the provinces of Punjab, Balochistan and the North West Frontier Province, but small native communities of converts to Christianity were formed. The largest numbers came from resident officers of the British Army and the government. European and wealthy native Christians established colleges, churches, hospitals and schools in cities like Karachi, Lahore, Rawalpindi and Peshawar. There is a large Catholic Goan community in Karachi that was established when Karachi's infrastructure was developed by the British before World War II, and the Irish (who were subjects of the British Empire and formed a large part of the British Army) were an important factor in the establishment of then the Catholic community of northwestern colonial India.

== Notable Pakistani Christians ==
=== Christians in Pakistani military services ===
The Christians in Pakistan have long been active in various fields of public service. Many Christians have served in the Pakistan Armed Forces, civilian services and other organizations. Some have received high civilian and military awards.

==== Pakistan Air Force ====
- Air Commodore Patrick Desmond Callaghan (1945–1971)
- Group Captain Cecil Chaudhry
- Squadron Leader Peter Christy
- Air Vice Marshal Eric Gordon Hall (1947–1977)
- Air Commodore Nazir Latif
- Wing Commander Mervyn L. Middlecoat
- Air Vice Marshal Michael John O'Brian

==== Pakistan Army ====
- Brigadier Daniel Austin
- Brigadier Mervyn Cardoza
- Lieutenant Colonel Derek Joseph
- Major General Julian Moazzam James
- Major General Noel Israel Khokhar
- Major General Julian Peter
- Brigadier Samson Simon Sharaf

==== Pakistan Navy ====
- Rear-Admiral Leslie Mungavin

=== Religious ministers ===
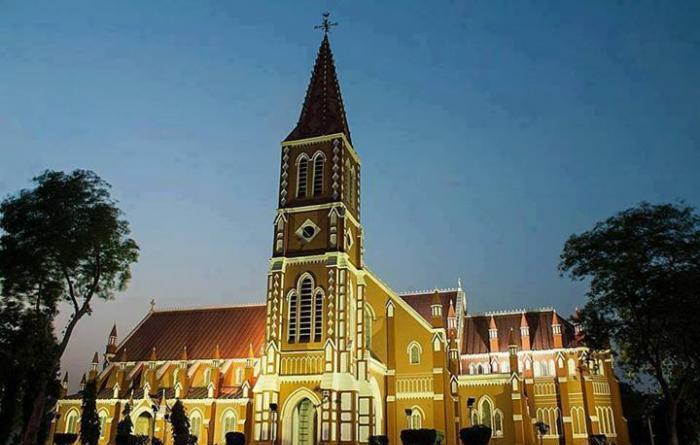
Night view of St Mary's Cathedral & Bishop's House Multan

- Rt. Rev. Samuel Robert Azariah
- Bishop Andrew Francis, former Bishop of Multan
- Anthony Theodore Lobo, awarded the Presidential Pride of Performance Award in 1990 for services to the cause of literature and education
- Bishop Azad Marshall Moderator of the Church of Pakistan and Bishop in Raiwind, President of the National Council of Churches of Pakistan
- Francis Nadeem, awarded Tamgha-e-Imtiaz for Public Service

=== Civil services and police ===
- Shahbaz Bhatti, member of the National Assembly and a member of the Pakistan Peoples Party (PPP) and Federal Minister for Minorities Affairs from 2008 - 2011
- Cincinnatus Fabian D'Abreo, administrator and politician
- Kamran Michael, senator who served as Minister for Statistics and a member of the Pakistan Muslim League (Nawaz) (PML-N)
- Manuel Misquita, former mayor of Karachi
- Dilshad Najmuddin former IG Police and former ambassador

=== Education ===
- Riffat Arif, teacher, women's activist and philanthropist from Gujranwala.
- Bernadette Louise Dean, academic and educator.
- Jacqueline Maria Dias, professor of nursing at the Aga Khan University.
- Norma Fernandes, teacher awarded the Tamgha-i-Imtiaz for her services to education.
- Mary Emily Gonsalves, awarded the Sitara-e-Imtiaz in recognition of her services to education.
- Yolande Henderson, veteran high school teacher.
- Oswald Bruno Nazareth, high school teacher for 50 years.

=== Politicians ===
- Naveed Aamir, Member of National Assembly (2018–2023)
- Clement Shahbaz Bhatti, Federal Minister for Minorities Affairs
- Kamran Michael, Federal Minister and Senator
- Aasiya Nasir, Member of National Assembly (2002–2018)
- Shunila Ruth, Member of National Assembly (2013–2018)
- Khalil Tahir Sandhu, Minister for Human Rights and Minorities Affairs (2008–2018)

=== Human rights defenders ===
- Romana Bashir, Member, Punjab Commission on the Status of Women (2014–2018)
- Dr. Rubina Feroze Bhatti, Member, National Commission on the Rights of the Child

=== Entertainment ===
- Bohemia, Pakistani-American rapper
- The Benjamin Sisters, band consisting of three sisters Nerrisa, Beena and Shabana Benjamin
- Alycia Dias, playback singer
- Sara Loren, actress and model
- Azekah Daniel, actress
- Shae Gill, Pakistani singer and cover-artist, mostly known for her Punjabi duet song "Pasoori"
- Sunita Marshall, television actress and model
- A. Nayyar, playback singer
- Irene Perveen, playback singer
- Nirmal Roy, musician and singer from Lahore
- Leo Twins, Haroon and Sharoon Leo, talented multi-instrumentalists and musicians
- Zoe Viccaji, singer and songwriter

=== Sports ===
- Norman Brinkworth, athlete
- Jack Britto, Olympic field hockey player
- Milton D'Mello, Olympic field hockey player
- Antao D'Souza, cricketer
- Sohail Fazal, cricketer
- Ian Fyfe, cricketer, coach and a sports journalist from Karachi
- Rony Gardener, Olympic field hockey player
- Samuel Gill, footballer
- Sydney Greve, boxer
- Jacob Harris, first class cricketer and sports coach from Karachi
- Shazia Hidayat, track and field athlete. Only female athlete on the Pakistan team competing at the 2000 Olympics in Sydney, Australia
- Samuel Harris, boxer
- Stephen John, cricketer
- Gulfam Joseph, sport shooter
- Wallis Mathias, cricketer
- Allan Monteiro, boxer
- John Permal, sprinter, once known as fastest man in Pakistan
- Sidra Sadaf, woman cyclist who won a silver medal at the 11th South Asian Games in Dhaka, Bangladesh in January 2010
- Duncan Sharpe, cricketer
- Joyann Thomas, women's footballer
- Yousaf Youhana, first class test cricketer who used to openly use the sign of the cross before starting his innings. He was one of the most successful batsmen of the Pakistan cricket team. He later converted to Islam, changing his name to Mohammad Yousuf
- Maurice White, boxer

=== Writers ===
- Cyril Almeida, journalist and an assistant editor for the daily newspaper Dawn.
- Kanwal Feroze, scholar, poet, writer and journalist.
- Nabeel Qureshi, former Ahmadi who converted to Christianity, wrote three books. Seeking Allah, Finding Jesus: A Devout Muslim Encounters Christianity, Answering Jihad: A Better Way Forward and No God BUT One: Allah or Jesus.
- Late Begum Bilquis Sheikh was an aristocratic Pakistani lady who converted from Islam to Christianity and wrote memoirs about this.

=== Other ===
- Sunny Benjamin John, singer from Karachi.
- Erica Robin, model and first ever winner of Miss Universe Pakistan, Top 20 at Miss Universe 2023.

=== Candidates to sainthood ===
- Akash Bashir, former student of the Don Bosco Technical Institute in Lahore, security guard and martyr. On 31 January 2022 Pope Francis declared him a Servant of God. He is the first native Pakistani candidate for sainthood in the history of the Catholic Church in Pakistan.
- Shahbaz Bhatti, former politician, assassinated because of his opposition to Pakistan's blasphemy law.

== See also ==
- Christianity in Punjab, Pakistan
- List of churches in Pakistan
- Demographics of Pakistan
- 2009 Gojra riots
- Asia Bibi blasphemy case
- Blasphemy in Pakistan
- Religion in Pakistan
- Freedom of religion in Pakistan
- Persecution of Christians in Pakistan
- Forced conversion of minority girls in Pakistan
- Religious discrimination in Pakistan
