= St. Paul's Church, Rawalpindi =

St. Paul's Church
- St. Paul's Church
- 33°35′29″N 73°03′15″E
- Location: Rawalpindi, Punjab
- Country: Pakistan
- Denomination: Presbyterian

History
- Founded: 1876

Administration
- Diocese: Presbyterian Church of Pakistan

St. Paul's Church is a presbyterian church located opposite to General Headquarters in Rawalpindi Cantonment, Pakistan. It is the second-oldest church in Rawalpindi after Christ Church, Rawalpindi.

Initially the church was established in 1908 with the help of Church of Scotland. Rev. Dr. Samuel Titus is the pastor-in-charge.

Currently, the church is being run by the Presbyterian Church of Pakistan.

== History ==
The church's foundation was laid in 1876 by Reverend G.J. Chree.

It formally started church services on 1 January 1908 for the Scottish army men in the British Army’s Northern Command. The church was constructed by the Church of Scotland. The construction was done by Rai Bahadur Ram Prasad Tewari who was a Garrison engineer in the Military Engineer Services.

In British era, the British troops used to come to church for Sunday prayer because Rawalpindi Cantonment was the official home for the British army in British empire. The first native Rev Peter was assigned for this church in 1943.

In 1947, at the time of indo-Pak division, the Church was handed over to the United Presbyterian Church, run by the American missionaries.
