= 2002 Idara Amn-o-Insaf attack =

Terrorist incident in Pakistan

- Location: 24.8642°N 67.0230°E
- Date: 25 September 2002
- Target: Christian community of Pakistan
- Attack type: Shooting
- Deaths: 7
- Injuries: 1
- Victims: 8
- Perpetrators: 2

On 25 September 2002, two gunmen conducted an attack on the Idara-e-Amn-o-Insaf near Rimpa Plaza in Karachi, Pakistan. The two gunmen entered the building with TT pistols and made the entire office staff hostage. Then, they blind-folded them and killed them one-by-one. Six were killed on the spot while one died in the hospital.

== Background ==
Idara Amn-o-Insaf is a Christian charity based in Karachi, Pakistan. It was formed in 1974 with financial assistance of the World Council of Churches.

== Victims ==
Following were the seven victims who died:

- Iqbal Allah Rakha, 40
- Benjiman Sadiq, 26
- Kamran Anjum, 25
- Jan Muneer, 30
- Aslam Martin, 45
- Mushtaq Roshan, 51
- Edwin Foster, 20
