= Pakistan women's national cycling team =

The Pakistan women's national cycling team represents Pakistan in international cycling competitions. It is administered by the Pakistan Cycling Federation (PCF). Members of the team compete in individual and team events at competitions including regional games (South Asian Games).

== Members ==
Members
Name	Competition	Events
Sabiha Bibi	South Asian Games: 2016,	Individual time trial (30 km), team time trial (40 km)
Rashida Munir	South Asian Games: 2010, 2016,	Team time trial (40 km) (2016)
Rajia Shabbir	South Asian Games: 2016,	Team time trial (40 km)
Fiza Riaz	South Asian Games: 2016,	Team time trial (40 km)

Former Members
Name	Competition	Events
Ayesha Amin	South Asian Games: 2010	Team time trial (30 km)
Misbah Mushtaq Ali	South Asian Games: 2010	Team time trial (30 km)
Rahila Bano	South Asian Games: 2010	Team time trial (30 km)
Sidra_Sadaf	South Asian Games: 2010	Team time trial (30 km)

== Results ==
=== South Asian Games ===
Individual Time Trial (30 km)
Year	Result	Position
(India) Guwahati 2016	Semi-Finalist	3rd

Team Time Trial (30/40 km)
Year	Event	Position
(Bangladesh) Dhaka 2010	Team Time Trial (30 km)	2nd
(India) Guwahati 2016	Team Time Trial (40 km)	3rd
