= United Presbyterian Church of Pakistan (1855–1993) =

Presbyterianism in Pakistan

- Classification: Protestant
- Orientation: Calvinist
- Theology: Reformed
- Polity: Presbyterian
- Region: Pakistan
- Origin: 1855
- Branched from: United Presbyterian Church of North America
- Separations: 1968: United Presbyterian Church of Pakistan
- Merged into: Council of Churches of Lahore to form the Presbyterian Church of Pakistan

For the current denomination, founded in 1968, dissenting from this, see United Presbyterian Church of Pakistan

The United Presbyterian Church of Pakistan was a Presbyterian, Reformed denominations in Pakistan. It was formed from missions of the United Presbyterian Church of North America, in 1855.

In 1993 it joined the Council of Churches of Lahore to form the present Presbyterian Church of Pakistan.

== History ==
=== Training ===
In 1855 the United Presbyterian Mission of the United States opened work in Lahore with Andrew Gordon as a missionary; two years later he established a mission station in Sialkot, where he was joined by other missionaries. Schools and an orphanage were opened by the missionary group. In 1859 the Presbytery of Sialkot was formed.

The "Sialkot Conventions", promoted by the church, have been held since 1904 and are recognized as fundamental to the strengthening and dissemination of the Christian faith in Pakistan. The Psalms used in the Sialkot Hymnbookwith Convention, as well as hymns in Punjabi and Urdu as Indian songs are widely used in all Protestant churches in the country.

The church grew, and other presbyteries were established. In 1893 the Synod of Punjab (SP) was formed as one of the synods of the United Presbyterian Church of North America.

The SP founded the Gujiranwala Seminary, which became a united seminary in 1954, which went on to serve for the training of ministers of various Protestant denominations in Pakistan such as the Church of Pakistan and Associate Reformed Presbyterian Church in Pakistan.

=== Separation ===
In 1968, as a result of the movement opposing McIntire's Liberal Theology, part of the members split off and founded the United Presbyterian Church of Pakistan (1968).

=== Fusion ===
On November 18, 1993, the first United Presbyterian Church of Pakistan (1855–1993) and the Council of Churches of Lahore (which at the time was affiliated with Church of Pakistan) united again and formed the present Presbyterian Church of Pakistan (PCP).
