= Protestantism in Pakistan =

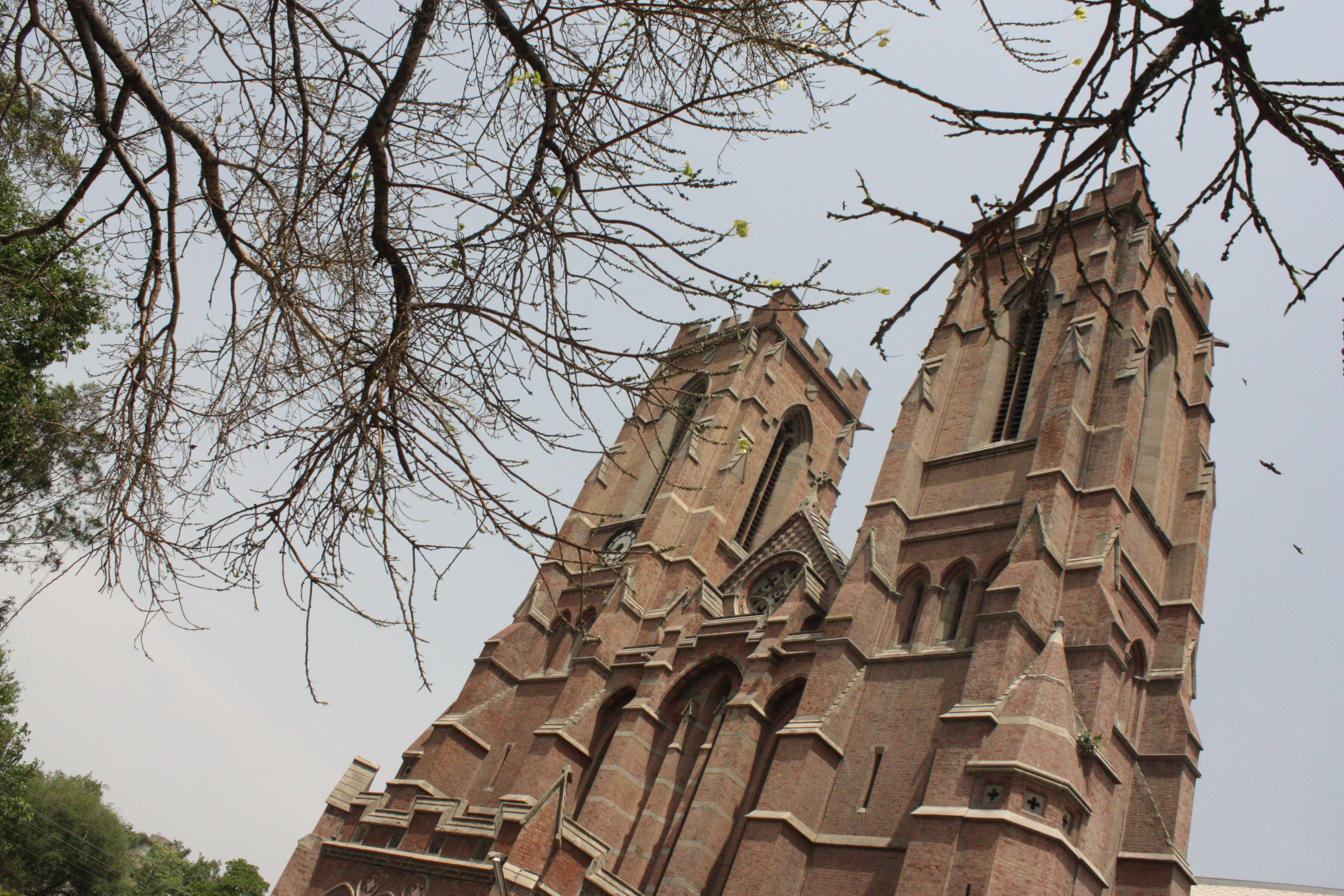
Cathedral Church of the Resurrection in Lahore

Protestants are in a minority of less than 1.5% of the population of Pakistan. It is the largest Christian denomination in the country, followed by Catholicism. Most of the Protestant population resides in urban areas of the Punjab province.

== History ==
In colonial India, the All India Conference of Indian Christians (AICIC) played an important role in the Indian independence movement, advocating for swaraj and opposing the partition of India. The AICIC also was opposed to separate electorates for Christians, believing that the faithful "should participate as common citizens in one common, national political system". The meeting of the All India Conference of Indian Christians in Lahore in December 1922, which had a large attendance of Punjabis, resolved that the clergymen of the Church in India should be drawn from the ranks of Indians, rather than foreigners. The AICIC also stated that Indian Christians would not tolerate any discrimination based on race or skin colour. S. K. Datta of Lahore, who served as the principal of Forman Christian College, became the president of the All India Conference of Indian Christians, representing the Indian Christian community at the Second Round Table Conference, where he agreed with Mahatma Gandhi's views on minorities and Depressed Classes. The All India Conference of Indian Christians and the All India Catholic Union formed a working committee with M. Rahnasamy of Andhra University serving as president and B.L. Rallia Ram of Lahore serving as General Secretary; in its meeting on 16 April 1947 and 17 April 1947, the joint committee prepared a 13-point memorandum that was sent to the Constituent Assembly of India, which asked for religious freedom for both organisations and individuals; this came to be reflected in the Constitution of India.

== List of Christian denominations ==
- Church of Pakistan
- Presbyterian Church of Pakistan
- Associate Reformed Presbyterian Church in Pakistan
- United Presbyterian Church of Pakistan (formerly known as Siloam Biblical Christian Church of Pakistan)

== See also ==
- New Apostolic Church
