= NCCP =

NCCP is an abbreviation, and can refer to the following:

- National Center for Children in Poverty
- National Council of Churches in the Philippines
- The National Consumer Credit Protection Act (Australian legislation)
- Nantou County Culture Park, a building in Nantou County, Taiwan
- Nuova Compagnia di Canto Popolare
- North Carolina Certified Paralegal
- National Council of Churches in Pakistan
- NCCP Structural formula for cyanophosphaethyne
