= Garrison engineer =

Indian central government officer

A Garrison Engineer is a central government officer in the Military Engineer Services of India. He or she is responsible for the whole infrastructure of the Indian Armed Forces and has the rank of Executive Engineer or Executive Engineer (Selection Grade) from the Indian Defence Service of Engineers (IDSE). Garrison Engineer is a designation which is held either by a civilian officer of M.E.S. from the IDSE Cadre or by a military officer of the rank of Major/Lt Col from the Corps of Engineers. The Garrison Engineer's staff consists of at least three Assistant Garrison Engineers, a Barrack Stores Officer, an Accounts Officer, and Junior Engineers. Responsibility of the position is to maintain and improve the infrastructure of the Indian Armed Forces. As per the Cantonment Act 2006, the Garrison Engineer shall be ex-officio Member of the Cantonment Boards. Accordingly, he attends the meetings of the board.

The first Indian to become an officiating Garrison Engineer was Rai Bahadur Pandit Ram Prasad Tewari, who served in the Military Engineer Services from 1880 to 1920. He had constructed the St. Paul's Church, Rawalpindi.
