= Pakistan Christian Congress =

Christian political party in Pakistan

Pakistan Christian Congress پاکستان کرسچن کانگریس
- Abbreviation: PCC
- President: Nazir S Bhatti
- Vice Presidents: Shahzad Parvaiz; Farhad Bhatti
- Founded: 1985; 41 years ago
- Headquarters: Lahore, Punjab
- Ideology: Christian minority interests Christian democracy Anti-racism; Anti-casteism
- Political position: Center-right
- Colors: Gold
- Senate: 0 / 104
- National Assembly: 0 / 366
- Punjab Assembly: 0 / 371
- Sindh Assembly: 0 / 168
- KP Assembly: 0 / 128
- Balochistan Assembly: 0 / 65
- Gilgit-Baltistan Assembly: 0 / 33
- Azad Kashmir Assembly: 0 / 49

Party flag

Website
- www.pakistanchristiancongress.org

The Pakistan Christian Congress (PCC) is a Christian political party and lobby group in Pakistan and was founded in 1985. The party aims to safeguard and advocate the social, religious and political rights of Christians in Pakistan. The party is headquartered in Lahore, Punjab, Pakistan.

The six point manifesto of Pakistan Christian Congress, adopted in Karachi in 1986 is a program of action to achieve the goal of human dignity, equality, security, well-being and prosperity for 2.8 million persecuted Christians in the whole of Pakistan state. The first point is basic Human and Democratic Rights for the Christians; since they, along with other religious minorities, have been deprived of basic rights since Pakistan's creation in 1947. Very few, if any, who kill, massacre, rape, kidnap Christians and vandalize their property have ever been brought to justice. The final nails in the coffin was introduction of Shariah laws by Pakistan's most extreme dictator, Muhammad Zia-ul-Haq.

Before the launch of the P.C.C., Christian social, religious and political leaders only focusing on local problems in past joined voice with this program and started talking about Christians constitutional rights which led the Christian nation in positive directions of struggle in society. The powers-that-be in the Pakistan government felt uneasy because it was presented by the educated Christians who could neither be threatened nor blackmailed. The PCC leaders and activists are of the considered view that political organizations founded by clergy in the past bartered away sacrifices made by Nawaz Masih and R.M.James in Rawalpindi who sacrificed their lives against nationalization of missionary schools and colleges. Some leaders joined hands with government agencies and Muslim fundamentalists to crush PCC and tried to sabotage the Christian movement.

== PCC Struggle for Separate Christian Province ==
On April 21, 1992, at Hotel Jabees, Karachi, the President, Pakistan Christian Congress, Mr. Nazir S Bhatti, demanded the separate province for the Christians of Pakistan, dividing Punjab province in three provinces. The Christians are second biggest population in Punjab.

The Bishops Conference of Pakistan have welcomed the Sharia Law in Jurist Conference at Lahore organised by the administration.
