= Daniel Austin =

Pakistani brigadier

Brigadier General Daniel Austin TBt
- Born: 1935; Sialkot
- Died: 29 December 2013 (aged 77–78)
- Burial place: Lahore, Pakistan
- Military career
- Allegiance: Pakistan
- Branch: Pakistan Army
- Rank: Brigadier
- Unit: Cavalry
- Commands: Director Budget
- Awards: Tamgha-e-Basalat
- Other work: Captain of the Pakistan Basketball Team; Director General, Pakistan Sports Board

Daniel Austin (1935 - 29 December 2013) was a Pakistan Army brigadier of Christian faith.

== Early life ==
He was born in Christian Town, Sialkot in 1935. He attended the CTI School in Sialkot, where he enjoyed athletics, track and field and basketball. He had a lifelong interest in basketball and was captain of his school, college and university teams.

== Sports ==
Austin captained the Pakistan national basketball team. Under his captaincy the team won silver medals in international championships in Tehran and Lahore. He was also a member of the national basketball team which played test matches against Iran and took part in the Quadrangular Championships in Sri Lanka in 1957. Austin also coordinated the National Boxing Championships in 1985 and the Pakistan-Holland hockey test matches in Islamabad. He was also the Chief Coordinator of the 4th SAF Games held in Islamabad in 1989. Austin also represented Pakistan on a number of international organizations and competitions. He was Pakistan’s deputy chef de mission at the 1982 Asian Games held in Delhi. He also served as Vice President of the Pakistan Olympic Association, the Pakistan Amateur Wrestling Federation, Chair of the Defence Services Sports Board and Director General, Pakistan Sports Board.

He served on the Board of the Christian Study Centre and St. John’s High School in Rawalpindi. He also served as Administrator and CEO of the United Christian Hospital, Lahore between 1990 and 1997.

Brigadier Austin died on 29 December 2013. A memorial service was held at the Cathedral Church of the Resurrection in Lahore on 25 January 2014.

The fourth Kashmir Cup All Pakistan Basketball Championship was postponed for a month as a mark of respect.
