= Milton D'Mello =

Pakistani field hockey player (born c. 1925)

Personal information
- Full name: Milton Muhammad D'Mello
- Nationality: Pakistani
- Born: c. 1925 Karachi, British India
- Died: before 2012

Sport
- Sport: Field hockey

Milton D'Mello (c. 1925 – before 2012) was a Pakistani field hockey player. He played left half and represented Pakistan in the men's tournament at the 1948 Summer Olympics.

Born Roman Catholic Christian, D'Mello was of Goan ancestry, and among the first Christian sportsmen who made significant contribution to sports when Pakistan was in its infancy.
