= Jacqueline Maria Dias =

- Born: Jacqueline Maria Soares; 19 December 1965 (age 60); Karachi, Pakistan
- Education: Ambrosiana University (Ph.D.)
- Occupation: Professor of nursing
- Years active: 1985 -
- Employer: University of Sharjah
- Awards: 2013 Excellence in Education Award
- Website: https://www.sharjah.ac.ae

Jacqueline Maria Dias is a nurse and professor of nursing from Karachi, Pakistan.

== Education ==
She did her Diploma in Nursing at the Aga Khan University's School of Nursing in 1985. She then worked at the Aga Khan University Hospital for a few years. She proceeded abroad for a Bachelor of Science in Nursing degree in Canada. In 1991, she graduated summa cum laude from McMaster University. She returned to Pakistan to continue to work at the Aga Khan University. In 1996 she was awarded the Anne Marie Schimmel Scholarship, to pursue a degree in the UK. In 2000 she received a Master of Education degree in Educational Management, from the University of Wales. In 2013, she started work on a PhD from Ambrosiana University in Milan, Italy, which she completed in 2016. Later that year, Pakistan's first simulation center with mock operating rooms and patient manikins, the Centre for Innovation in Medical Education, was opened at the Aga Khan Hospital with Dias as its interim director.

== Career ==
Dias has served the Aga Khan University as an Assistant Professor of Nursing and Director of the Bachelor of Science in Nursing programme. Since 2004, she has held the Nurudin Jivraj Professorship of Nursing.

In her 2004 keynote address to the First Midwifery Symposium on "Updates in Midwifery", Dias suggested that upgrading the status of midwives would have a positive impact on the high rate of complications during delivery.

She has been an active participant in the School of Nursing and Midwifery's Curriculum Committee and has twice served as Chair of the committee.

Her contribution has been immense in the standardization of professional nursing examinations, workshops and short courses, and faculty development programmes for curriculum enhancement, assessment and examinations. She has been convener of the Higher Education Commission of Pakistan and Pakistan Nursing Council's Curriculum Committee, which led the team that produced the revised national curriculum for nursing. Dias has also worked with the Nursing Council on the National BScN curriculum, as well as assisting the Sindh Examination Board in meeting international standards.

Dias has been a member of the team that set up the BScN curriculum for Al-Baath University in Syria. She has also contributed technical input into the nursing curriculum in Afghanistan.

Since 2010, Dias has been pioneering the application of e-learning methodology for the delivery of online courses and restructuring of pedagogical methods. In 2011, she initiated the establishment of the Assessment and Examination Cell for the School of Nursing and Midwifery. She has also done research in the evaluation of teaching in nursing education.

In 2013, the Aga Khan University School of Nursing and Midwifery introduced a 'Care of the Elderly' course, designed to provide training in geriatrics to nursing students for the first time in Pakistan. An important step for the growing older population. Dias, as the director of the BSc Nursing program, is responsible for the implementation of the curriculum.

In 2013 Dias held a joint appointment with Aga Khan University's Department of Educational Development and the School of Nursing and Midwifery. She has had a profound impact on three decades of nursing students at the AKU.

In 2015, in connection with International Nurses and Midwives Day, as the keynote speaker at Ziauddin College of Nursing Dias pointed out the importance of adopting more modern approaches to recruitment, especially the need to provide opportunities for those who had received a diploma before the introduction of the standard curriculum in 2006. She pointed out that at 1:3, the ratio of nurses to doctors in Pakistan needed to be reversed.

In 2019 she took up a position as Associate Professor and Chair of the Department of Nursing at the University of Sharjah.

== Award ==
In 2013, the Aga Khan University Award of Excellence in Education was presented to Dias by the Chancellor, the Aga Khan. The award is for her leadership of baccalaureate education at the School and in Pakistan. The citation reads "recognizes and honours publicly faculty who have made outstanding contributions to education, including contributions in curriculum and course design, evaluation of programmes and students, development of learning resources, and teaching."
