= National Council of Churches in Pakistan =

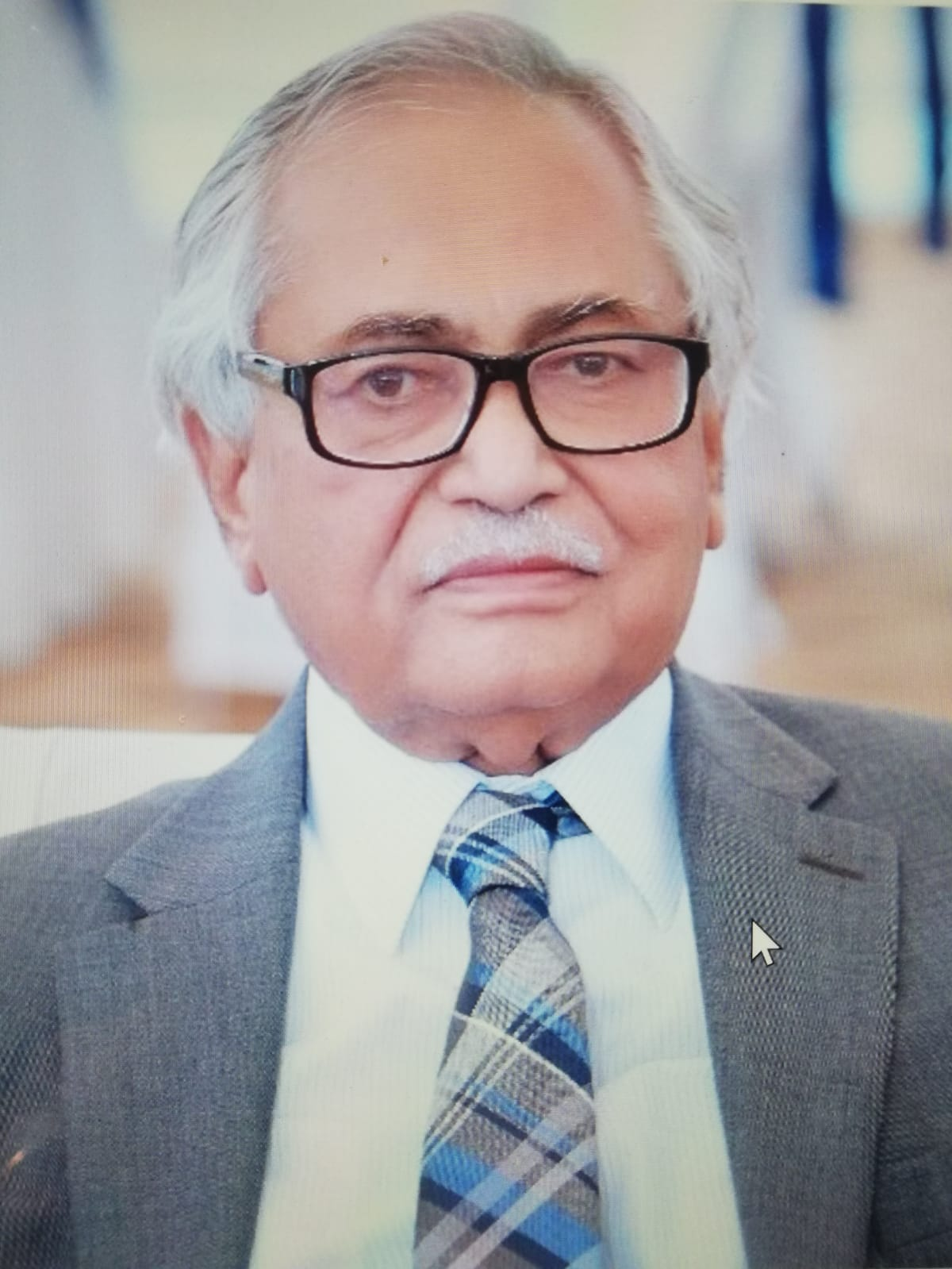
Victor Azariah, General Secretary (Honorary), NCCP

National Council of Churches in Pakistan (NCCP) is the representative body of the Protestant Churches in Pakistan.

It was founded as West Pakistan Christian Council in 1948 and was later renamed in 1975.

The notable members of the council include the Church of Pakistan, Presbyterian Church of Pakistan, The Salvation Army and The Associated Reformed Presbyterian Church.
