= United Presbyterian Church of Pakistan =

- Classification: Protestant
- Orientation: Calvinist
- Theology: Reformed
- Polity: Presbyterian
- Moderator: Kamil Nasir
- Region: Pakistan
- Origin: 1968
- Separated from: United Presbyterian Church of Pakistan (1855–1993) (which in 1993 merged with Council of Churches of Lahore to form the present Presbyterian Church of Pakistan)
- Branched from: United Presbyterian Church of North America
- Congregations: 200 (2018)
- Members: 250,000 (2018)

The United Presbyterian Church of Pakistan is the second-largest Presbyterian, Reformed denomination and the third-largest Protestant denomination in Pakistan. It was formed in 1968 by churches that split from the United Presbyterian Church of Pakistan (1855–1993).

== History ==
In 1855 the United Presbyterian Mission of the United States opened work in Lahore with Andrew Gordon as a missionary; Two years later he established a mission station in Sialkot, where he was joined by other missionaries. Schools and an orphanage were opened by the missionary group. In 1859 the Presbytery of Sialkot was formed.

The "Sialkot Conventions", promoted by the church, have been held since 1904 and are recognized as fundamental to the strengthening and dissemination of the Christian faith in Pakistan. The Psalms used in the Sialkot Hymnbookwith Convention, as well as hymns in Punjabi and Urdu as Indian songs are widely used in all Protestant churches in the country.

The church grew, and other presbyteries were established. In 1893 the Synod of Punjab (SP) was formed as one of the synods of the United Presbyterian Church of North America.

The SP founded the Gujiranwala Seminary, which became a united seminary in 1954, which went on to serve for the training of ministers of various Protestant denominations in Pakistan such as the Church of Pakistan and Associate Reformed Presbyterian Church in Pakistan.

The same synod became autonomous in 1961 forming the United Presbyterian Church of Pakistan (1855–1993). In 1968, as a result of the movement supporting McIntire's conservative Theology, part of the members split and founded another denomination with the same name "United Presbyterian Church of Pakistan" (UPCP).

On November 18, 1993, the first United Presbyterian Church of Pakistan (1855–1993) and the Lahore Council of Churches (which at the time was affiliated with Church of Pakistan) united again and formed the present Presbyterian Church of Pakistan (PCP).

As such, only the splinter denomination, formed in 1968, continued to use the name "United Presbyterian Church of Pakistan".

== Policy & Statistics ==
The church's emphasis is on the Christian Bible as "the inspired, inerrant, infallible and revealed WORD of GOD". One of the oldest churches in the sub-continent, membership is estimated to be approximately 250,000, including 100 pastors, 100 evangelists, 500 elders and 150 church buildings. The session is the basic unit with teaching elders, ruling elders and deacons. The presbytery is a higher body. Activities of the church include evangelism, education, agriculture, jail, community development and theological education. Their head office is located in Gujranwala.

== Interchurch Relations ==
The denomination is a member of ICCC.

IPUP participates in the Society of Biblical Christian Churches of Pakistan and runs, together with the Anglican Orthodox Church of Pakistan, a seminar for training pastors.

Is a former member of World Reformed Fellowship. However, since 2025, it is no longer listed among the organization's members.

== See also ==
- Church of Pakistan
- Protestantism in Pakistan
