= Romana Bashir =

Pakistani activist

- Citizenship: Pakistani
- Occupation: Activist
- Employer(s): Peace and Development Foundation, Rawalpindi
- Known for: Promoting interfaith harmony and women's education
- Board member of: Vatican Commission for Religious Relations with Muslims

Romana Bashir is a Pakistani community activist for women and minority rights and religious tolerance. Bashir is a past executive director of the Peace and Development Foundation in Rawalpindi and was appointed by Pope Benedict XVI as a consultor for the Commission for Religious Relations with Muslims.

== Activism ==
Bashir, a Catholic woman, began working in 1997 at the grassroots level, working with the community to promote interfaith harmony and women's education. She was a member of the Christian Study Centre, which promotes freedom of expression, justice, dignity and equality. In Rawalpindi, Bashir joined the Christian Study Centre as a trainee and was later promoted to head of programs in 2009.

In 2012, she was appointed by Pope Benedict XVI as a consultor of the Commission for Religious Relations with Muslims within the Pontifical Council for Interreligious Dialogue of the Vatican. She is the first Pakistani Christian lay woman appointed to such a position.

In 2013, she was Executive Director, Peace and Development Foundation in Rawalpindi.

In 2021 she was listed in Sharmeen Obaid-Chinoy's White In The Flag project as a human rights defender.

== Speaker ==
In 2012 she was a member of a panel of five speakers at a press conference by Centre for Legal Aid Assistance and Settlement (CLAAS). The panel called for the blasphemy law be revised to prevent its misuse, abuse and exploitation. In November 2012, she spoke at a workshop organised by Pakistan Institute for Peace Studies for young religious scholars representing all sects of Islam and members of the Sikh, Baháʼí, and Christian communities. In 2013, she was a speaker at a seminar on “Tolerance in Pakistan” held at Quaid-e-Azam University’s (QAU). The seminar urged people to speak up against the rising levels of violence and intolerance related to ethnic and religious differences in the country.

== See also ==
- Catholic Church in Pakistan
