= New Apostolic Church in Pakistan =

Christian community in Pakistan

The New Apostolic Church is one of the main Christian denominations of Pakistan. It had more than 200,000 members in 2003. It belongs to the area of the D. AP. Araud Martig and AP Jonathan Sturm. The in-charge for Pakistan is Apostle Ifrahim Roshan. He is the most responsible personality for the New Apostolic Church Pakistan. There are five more area heads with five bishops and four apostles working with Apostle Ifrahim Roshan.

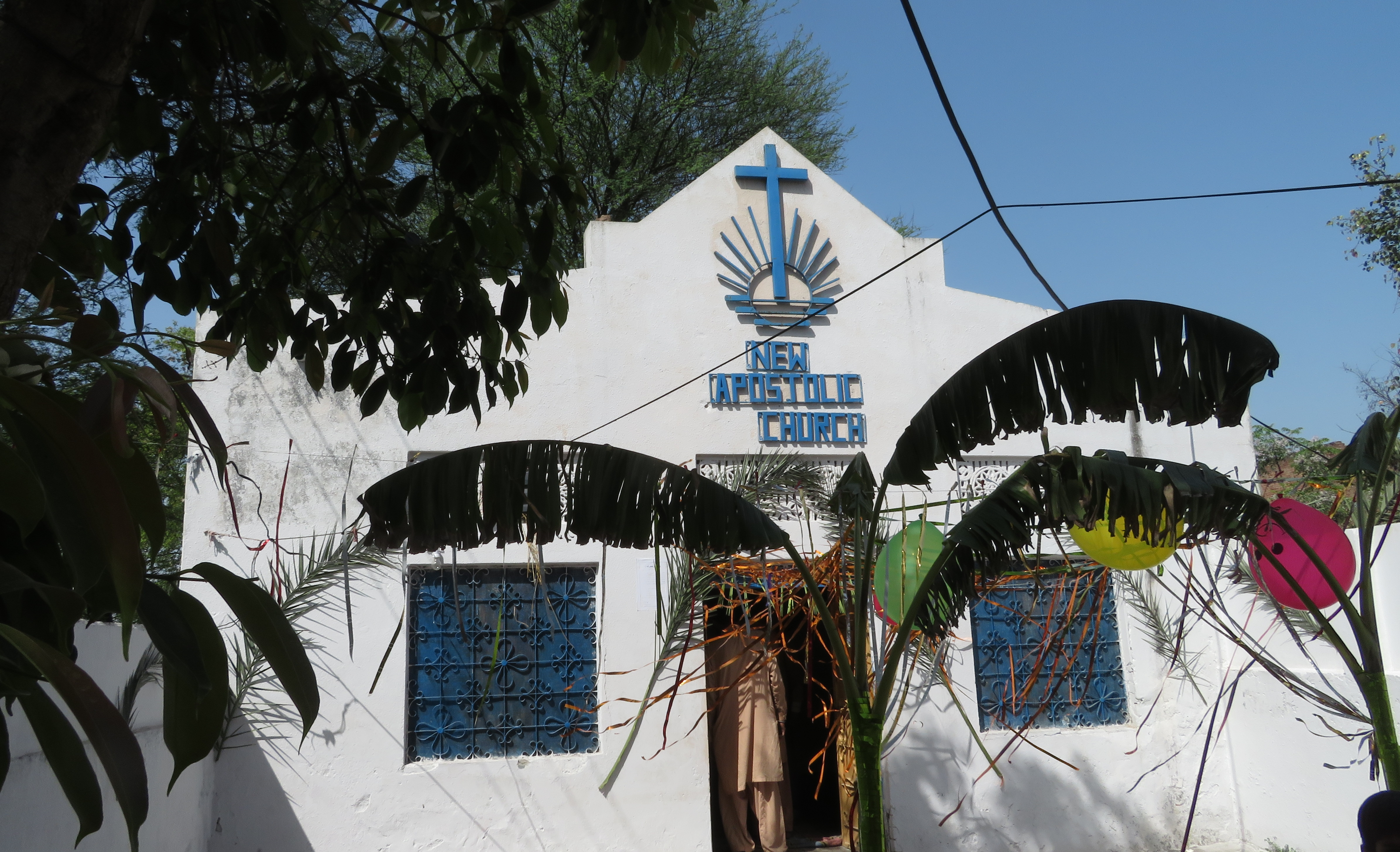
New Apostolic Church near Gujranwala

New Apostolic Church is a registered organization. Its administration office is situated in Lahore, Yohunnabad.

New Apostolic Church Pakistan has various types of teaching material to upgrade the knowledge of different age groups. To meet this purpose the church has national level committees like the Sunday School Committee, Confirmation Committee Youth Committee, Music Committee, and Teaching Committee. It is the only church in Pakistan whose ministers are not only working in the city areas but also in the remote areas of Punjab, Sindh, and K.P.K provinces united with their International Church Leader, the Chief Apostle, through their District Apostle, their District Apostle Helper, and their Lead Apostle engage their efforts to strengthen the unity in the congregations. It is their concern to contribute to the unity of Christianity. One of the goals (as it was also once again described by the Rt. Chief Apostle Jean Luc Schneider) is not to unite all Christians into a single denomination, but rather to create a climate of trust and mutual appreciation where the things that bind us together as Christians are emphasized.

The main goal of the faith is the preparation for the return of Jesus Christ.

== See also ==
- Christianity in Pakistan
- Persecution of Christians
