= Aasiya Nasir =

Pakistani politician

- آسیہ ناصر

Member of the National Assembly of Pakistan
- In office 2013 – 31 May 2018
- In office 2008–2013
- Constituency: Reserved seat for women
- In office 2002–2007
- Constituency: Reserved seat for minorities

Personal details
- Party: Jamiat Ulema-e-Islam (F)

Aasiya Nasir (Urdu: آسیہ ناصر) is a Pakistani politician who had been a member of the National Assembly of Pakistan from 2002 to May 2018.

== Early life and education ==
She was born on 15 July 1971 in Quetta, Pakistan.

She has done Masters in English Literature from Government Girls College, Quetta. She also received Certificate in Teachers Training from the Notre Dame Institute of Education.

== Political career ==
Aasiya was elected to the National Assembly of Pakistan on a reserved seat for minorities as a candidate of Muttahida Majlis-e-Amal in the 2002 Pakistani general election.

She was re-elected to the National Assembly on a seat reserved for women from Balochistan as a candidate of Muttahida Majlis-e-Amal in the 2008 Pakistani general election.

She was re-elected to the National Assembly of Pakistan as a candidate of Jamiat Ulema-e-Islam (F) on a seat reserved for minority in the 2013 Pakistani general election.

In June 2014, Aasiya raised the issue why non-Muslims cannot be elected as Prime Minister or President of the country. She also opposed the ban on consumption of alcohol by the non-Muslim community in Pakistan.
