= Presbyterian Church of Pakistan =

- Classification: Protestant
- Orientation: Presbyterian
- Scripture: Protestant Bible
- Theology: Reformed
- Polity: Presbyterian
- Moderator General Assembly: Vacant
- Associations: Christian Conference of Asia; World Council of Churches; World Communion of Reformed Churches
- Region: Pakistan
- Headquarters: Lahore, Punjab
- Origin: 1993
- Branched from: United Presbyterian Church of North America
- Merger of: United Presbyterian Church of Pakistan (1855–1993) and the Council of Churches of Lahore
- Separations: 1968: United Presbyterian Church of Pakistan
- Congregations: 220 (2016)
- Members: 500,000 (2025)
- Official website: presbyterianchurchpakistan.org

The Presbyterian Church of Pakistan (PHC) is the second largest Protestant denomination in Pakistan. It was formed in 1993 by the merger of the United Presbyterian Church of Pakistan (1855–1993) and the Council of Churches of Lahore. The church is administered from Lahore.

As of 2025, the church has around 500,000 members, 220 congregations, 208 pastors, and 24 presbyteries, making it the largest Presbyterian denomination in the country and second largest Protestant denomination after the Church of Pakistan.

== History ==
=== Lahore Council of Churches ===
The United Presbyterian Church of North America began missionary work in Pakistan in 1834 in the Ludhina region. A year after JC Lowrie, the first Presbyterian missionary in the country, moved from Ludhiana to Lahore. In 1849 John Newton and Charles Forman went to the same region to work as missionaries. Soon they extended their work to Rawalpindi. His efforts resulted in the founding of the Council of Churches of Lahore.

In 1904, long before other Presbyterian communities, the Council of Churches of Lahore, formerly part of the United Presbyterian Church, was absorbed into the United Church of North India.

=== United Presbyterian Church of Pakistan ===
In 1855 the United Presbyterian Mission of the United States opened work in Lahore with Andrew Gordon as a missionary; two years later he established a mission station in Sialkot, where he was joined by other missionaries. Schools and an orphanage were opened by the missionary group. In 1859 the Presbytery of Sialkot was formed.

The "Sialkot Conventions", promoted by the church, have been held since 1904 and are recognized as fundamental to the strengthening and dissemination of the Christian faith in Pakistan. The Psalms used in the Sialkot Hymnbookwith Convention, as well as hymns in Punjabi and Urdu as Indian songs are widely used in all Protestant churches in the country.

The church grew, and other presbyteries were established. In 1893 the Synod of Punjab (SP) was formed as one of the synods of the United Presbyterian Church of North America.

The SP founded the Gujiranwala Seminary, which became a merged seminary in 1954, which went on to serve for the training of ministers of various Protestant denominations in Pakistan such as the Church of Pakistan and Associate Reformed Presbyterian Church in Pakistan.

The same synod became autonomous in 1961 forming the United Presbyterian Church of Pakistan (1855–1993). In 1968, as a result of the movement opposing McIntire's Liberal Theology, part of the members split off and founded the United Presbyterian Church of Pakistan.

In contrast the United Presbyterian Church of Pakistan (1855–1993) became administratively independent of the North American church.

=== Fusion ===
On November 18, 1993, and the Council of Churches of Lahore (which at the time was affiliated with Church of Pakistan) merged again and formed the present Presbyterian Church of Pakistan (PCP).

== 21st century ==
The Presbyterian Church of Pakistan is known for its work in evangelism, education, health care, literacy, agriculture and social welfare. Evangelism is done by pastors, evangelists and lay workers and includes training church members, planting new churches for growth and building churches and pastoral houses. The Church's educational work suffered from the nationalization of schools in 1972, but the church established new primary, middle, and high schools for boys and girls, and pensions for students.

The church maintains two hospitals and provides education and healthcare for the people. The denomination began literacy work in Pakistan, which is now carried out by an NGO, and continues to cooperate with the government to promote literacy. The Presbyterian Church is also the initiator of theological education in Pakistan, through a seminar for candidates for the ministry and lay extension classes. In addition, the church has agricultural services focused on helping peasants with production techniques, seed conservation and fertilizers.

As of 2016, the church has around 300,000 members, 220 congregations, 208 pastors, and 80 presbyteries, making it the largest Presbyterian denomination in the country and second largest Protestant denomination, behind Church of Pakistan.

Pakistanis report the existence of religious persecution by the population of the country of Christians who form a minority in Pakistan. As the Presbyterians form one of the largest Christian groups in the country, there are many reports of religious persecution against them in the region.

In 2018, the denomination split into three groups over disagreements over the succession of the denomination's president. In 2024, the three groups reconciled, reconstituting the denomination's unity.

By 2025, the denomination was estimated to have 500,000 members in 24 presbyteries.

== Doctrine ==
The church subscribes to: the Apostles' Creed, the Athanasian Creed, the Nicene Creed, the Heidelberg Catechism and the Westminster Confession.

== Inter-Church Relations ==
The church is a member of the World Council of Churches, of the Christian Conference of Asia, from National Council of Churches in Pakistan and World Communion of Reformed Churches. In addition, it has fraternal relations with the Presbyterian Church (USA).

== See also ==
- Protestantism in Pakistan
