= Julian Peter =

Pakistani general (died 2023)

Major General Julian Peter HI(M)
- Born: Rawalpindi
- Died: 1 March 2023; Rawalpindi, Punjab, Pakistan
- Military career
- Allegiance: Pakistan
- Branch: Pakistan Army
- Service years: 1965–2002
- Rank: Major General
- Nickname: Javed
- Unit: 4FF
- Commands: 4FF; 31FF; 45FF; 124 Brigade; 40th Division; Director General Logistics
- Conflicts: Indo-Pakistani War of 1971
- Awards: Hilal-e-Imtiaz (Military)
- Other work: Director Fauji Fertilizer Bin Qasim Limited

Julian Peter (died 1 March 2023) was the first Christian Major General in the Pakistan Army.

Peter lived in Gawalmandi, Rawalpindi and he was educated at St Mary's Cambridge School, Murree Road, Rawalpindi. He received military training at the Pakistan Military Academy, Kakul.

In 1971 Major Peter was wounded while commanding a rifle company. He refused evacuation and continued fighting until surrender.

Peter rose through the army ranks to become a Brigadier in April 1989 after which he commanded 124 Brigade in Sialkot Cantonment. In April 1993 he became the first Christian promoted to the rank of Major General. Peter commanded the 40th Strike Division in Okara Cantonment.

In 1999 Major General Julian Peter was Director General Logistics based in Rawalpindi. He is a recipient of the Hilal-e-Imtiaz (Military). Peter served as the General Officer Commanding of a Division and as general staff officer at Army Headquarters until his retirement in 2004. In 2004 he was a director of Fauji Fertilizer Bin Qasim Limited.

In December 2011 he was the chief guest at an investiture ceremony at St Mary's Cambridge School.

Peter died in Rawalpindi on 1 March 2023.

== See also ==
- Ashok Kumar (soldier)
