= Samuel Azariah =

Pakistani Anglican bishop

The Most Reverend Samuel Azariah
- Moderator of the Church of Pakistan, Bishop of Rawindi
- Church: Church of Pakistan
- In office: 2009-present

Orders
- Ordination: 1980
- Consecration: 19 July 1987

Personal details
- Born: August 31, 1949 (age 76) Karachi

Samuel Sammy Robert Azariah (born Gujarat, 31 August 1949) is a Protestant Pakistani bishop in the Church of Pakistan, a united Protestant denomination that holds membership in the Anglican Communion, World Methodist Council and World Communion of Reformed Churches. He is married to Khushnud and they have three daughters.

== Early life ==
Azariah studied at St. Paul's High School Karachi and at St. Patrick's College, in Karachi. He completed his Honours in Sociology at the University of Karachi, in 1971.

== Ecclesiastical career ==
In 1979, he was ordained a deacon of the Church of Pakistan, a united Protestant denomination that holds membership in the Anglican Communion, World Methodist Council and World Communion of Reformed Churches; he was ordained as a priest in 1980. He served first as curate at St. Andrew's Church, in Karachi, to serve mainly his small English language congregation. He later became Rector, which he was until 1987. He taught during this time at the Church of Pakistan Seminary, now known as St. Thomas' Seminary. He was elected the youngest Bishop of the Diocese of Raiwind in 1987. He first served as the Moderator of the Church of Pakistan, from 1997 to 2002, and served once again from 2009 to 2017. He also serves on the executive committee of the World Council of Churches.

In 2017, he was awarded the Hubert Walter Award for Reconciliation and Interfaith Cooperation by the Archbishop of Canterbury.
