= Sidra Sadaf =

Pakistani cyclist

Sidra Sadaf (Urdu: سدرہ صدف) is a Pakistani woman cyclist who won a silver medal at the 11th South Asian Games in Dhaka, Bangladesh in January 2010.

Sadaf suffers from Hepatitis C. The Christian college student was diagnosed with the disease during a check-up shortly before the games.

Sadaf won silver at the Games in the 30 kilometer road team time trial event to make her the country’s first Christian woman medal winner.

She first started practicing on her father’s bicycle in the school playground. At school, Sadaf started participating in cycling events and became the female cycling champion at district and school board level for the next five years. However, it was only after joining college that Sadaf became serious about pursuing cycling. In 2008, the President of the Faisalabad’s Cycling Association spotted her and offered to train her. A coach was hired and practice started, resulting in her selection for the Punjab team.

To prepare for the South Asian Games, Sadaf underwent training for nine months. At end of the 2009 National Women’s Championship, she wasn’t satisfied with her performance. She was nonetheless selected for the cycling team for the South Asian Games.

Sadaf cycled daily at the ground of her former school and on the streets of the city, for as long as three hours, covering a distance of 60–70 km. She also maintained a strict diet and an exercise regimen designed for maximum fitness. Her father is a mason. There were times when financial constraints wouldn’t allow her to follow the fitness diet, but nevertheless support from the family gave her strength and encouragement.

Cycling is a costly and dangerous sport in Pakistan. The equipment and cycles are very expensive while there is the risk of injury. For this reason most women don’t choose this sport.

At a reception, the Punjab Sports Coalition presented her with her first sport cycle while the Diocesan Catholic Board of Education presented her with a shield.

She won second position in the 22-kilometer race at women cycling competition at the Punjab Sports Festival.

In February 2017, Sadaf was declared as the best cyclist of the HEC Inter-varsity Women’s Cycling Championships.

In March 2017, Sadaf won the First Women Open Road Race organized by the Punjab Cycling Association to celebrate Pakistan Day. 44 female cyclists from all over Lahore participated.
