= Cathedral Church of the Resurrection =

- Lahore Cathedral
- Kukar Girja
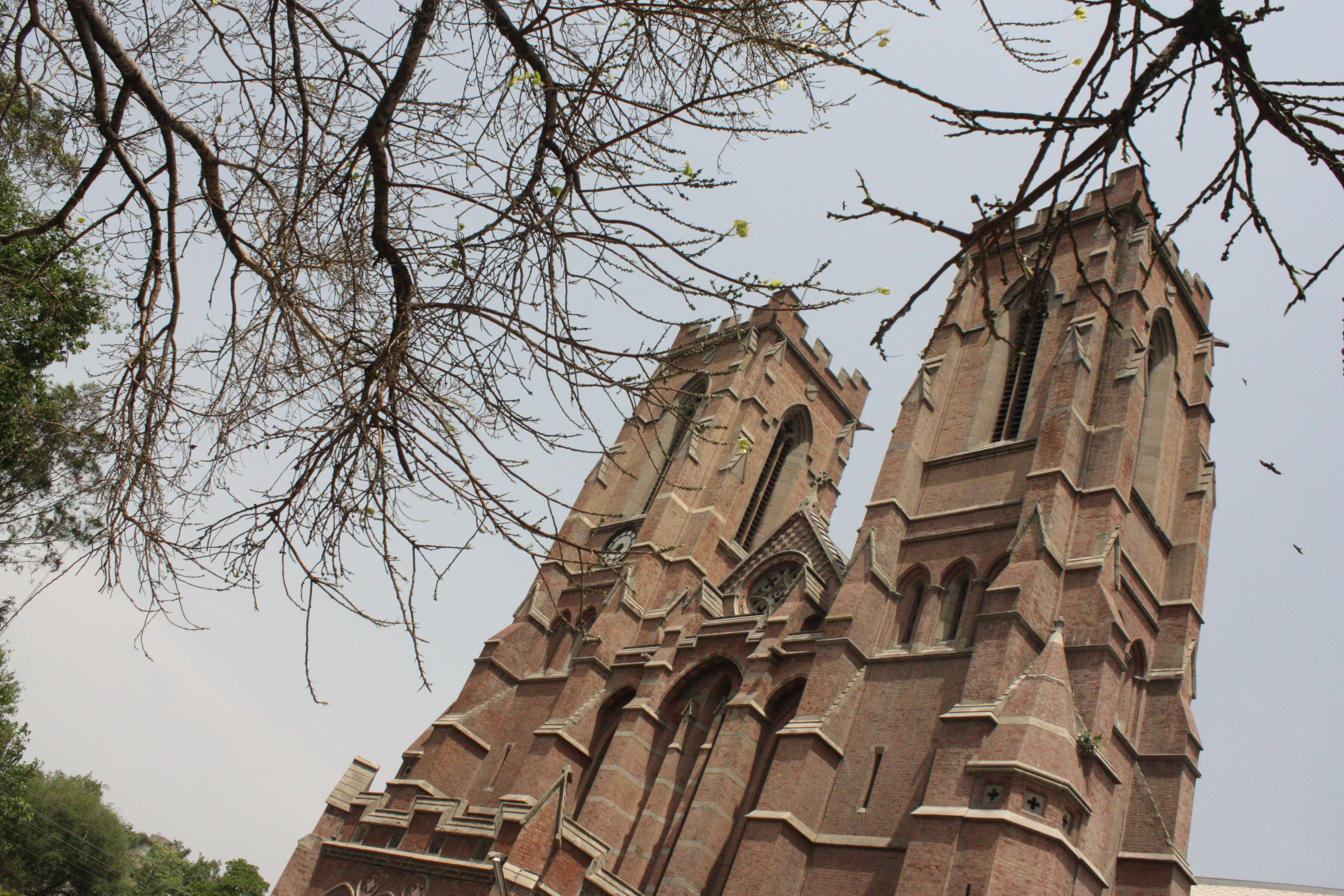
- Cathedral Church of the Resurrection
- Cathedral Church of the Resurrection
- 31°33′55″N 74°19′03″E
- Location: The Mall, Lahore
- Country: Pakistan
- Denomination: Church of Pakistan
- Previous denomination: Church of India, Burma and Ceylon

History
- Status: Cathedral

Architecture
- Functional status: Active
- Architect: John Oldrid Scott
- Style: Neo-Gothic
- Completed: 1887; 139 years ago

Specifications
- Materials: Sandstone

Administration
- Diocese: Lahore

Clergy
- Bishop: Rev. Irfan Jamil

The Cathedral Church of the Resurrection, also known as Lahore Cathedral, is a United Protestant cathedral located in Lahore, Pakistan. It was built on The Mall road in 1887, opposite the Lahore High Court.

The cathedral is the seat of the Diocese of Lahore, of the Church of Pakistan. The building is in the Neo-Gothic style of architecture and was completed in 1887; and was consecrated on 25 January 1887. The cathedral was originally built out of pink sandstone by architect John Oldrid Scott (son of George Gilbert Scott). In 1898, two towers with tall steeples were added to the building, but the steeples were taken down after the earthquake of 1911.

The Cathedral Church is commonly referred to by Lahoris as Kukar Girja (Girja being a Hindi/Urdu word meaning 'church' originating from Portuguese igreja) because of a weather cock that was mounted on the central lantern, one of the highest points.

== History ==
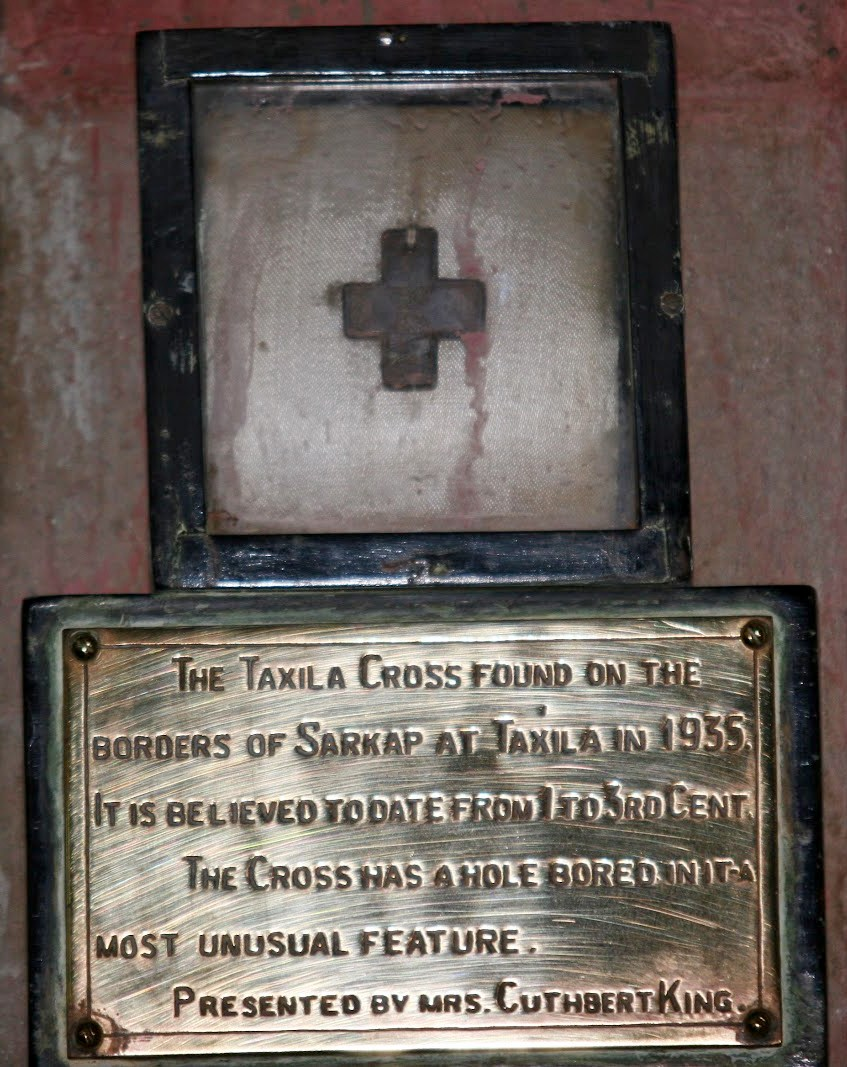
Taxila Cross, discovered in 1935 at Sirkap near Taxila and placed at Lahore Cathedral

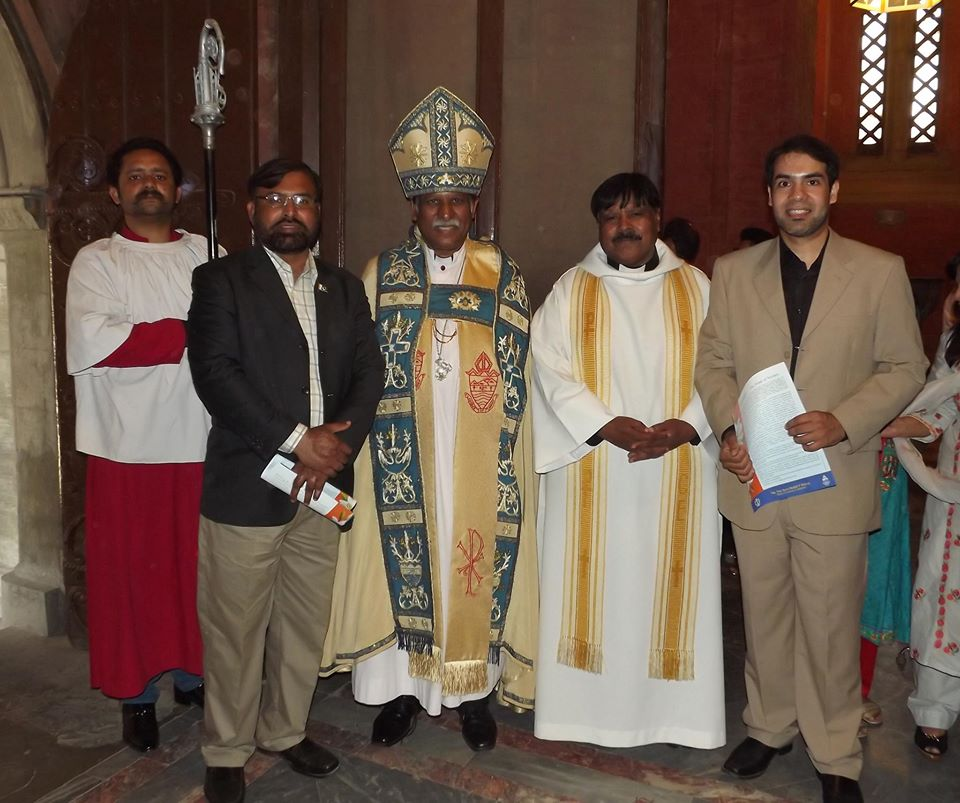
Easter Celebrations in Cathedral

According to historians, the first church of Lahore was constructed in 1595 near the Lahore Fort, during the Portuguese period when Jesuit missionaries were attending the court of the Mughal Empire. There were three Jesuit missions to Mughal court, as invited by Akbar(1556-1605). The third mission was led by Father Jerome Xavier (1549-1617) who arrived in Lahore in 1595. Emperor Akbar granted formal permission for the construction of a church near the Lahore fort in 1595. On the order of Emperor Jahangir, it was closed in 1614. Ten years later, the church was re-opened but in 1632, on the orders of the Emperor Shah Jehan it was demolished, even though various missions continued to live and preach in Lahore. Two centuries later, the church was again established at Lahore by the British. Today the Cathedral Church of the Resurrection, Lahore is the centre of the Lahore Diocese, which was carved out of the Diocese of Calcutta, the largest Anglican diocese in South Asia, in 1877, which included the area up to Delhi, East Punjab, Kashmir, Afghanistan, with some responsibility for the southern states of the Persian Gulf.

== Features ==
A treasure of the cathedral is the ancient Saint Thomas Cross of Saint Thomas Christians excavated in 1935 near the site of the ancient city of Sirkap, although its antiquity is disputed . The structure is also well known for its stained glass windows, pipe organ, and a clock that dates back to 1862.

=== Bells ===
Originally the Church was to have eight change-ringing bells, however only six arrived from England. They were cast in 1903 by John Taylor & Co of Loughborough. The largest bell weighs a ton and used to vibrate the foundations. Until the installation of a peal of twelve bells at St Andrew's Cathedral, Singapore in 2019, they were the only 'ringable' peal of church bells on the whole continent of Asia. There is another peal of bells at the Church of the Holy Name in Pune, India, however these are considered 'unringable' because the tower is cracked, and could not withstand the stresses associated with change ringing.

=== Organ ===
Another important possession of the cathedral is a huge organ, which is currently not in use. According to Roy Menzies, a regular visitor to the church, it was last used in 1982. He says: "I still remember the melodious tunes of this organ. Sir Griffin James was the last one to play it till 1982".

== See also ==
- Christianity in Pakistan
- Sacred Heart Cathedral, Lahore (Catholic)
