= Associate Reformed Presbyterian Church in Pakistan =

Christian Denomination

- Classification: Protestant
- Orientation: Evangelical Calvinist
- Theology: conservative Reformed
- Polity: Presbyterian
- Headquarters: Sahiwal
- Founder: Minnie Alexander
- Origin: 1911; Pakistan
- Branched from: Associate Reformed Presbyterian Church
- Congregations: 100
- Members: 150,000

The Associate Reformed Presbyterian Church in Pakistan is a Protestant denomination in Pakistan that forms part of the Associate Reformed Presbyterian Church.

== History ==
The Associate Reformed Presbyterian Church had its beginnings in the 17th century, whereas the Associate Reformed Presbyterian Church in Pakistan was founded in 1911. The Church of Pakistan and the Presbyterian Church of Pakistan are among the other Protestant Christian denominations in Pakistan. The Associate Reformed Presbyterian Church of Pakistan has a membership of around 150,000.

The centennial celebration of the church was held in Karachi where more than 5,000 ARP members were present. The beginning of the church was in 1906. Under British rule Dr. Minnie Alexander came to Montgomery to extend medical assistance to the poor. Dr. Minnie started mission work by working at a small clinic in Sialkot. Alexander's tenacity draw many more missionaries to Pakistan, and now the denomination has more than 110,000 members. Ranson came to Pakistan with his family in 1920.

Dr. Minnie's small clinic became a 160-bed hospital. The church established the School of Nursing in Sahiwal in 1948. The denomination has several Christian schools in Pakistan. The ARP mission has planted 100 churches in Pakistan, 28 of which were planted in Karachi.

== Theological education ==
The Gujranwala Theological Seminary serves the Associate Reformed Presbyterian Church in Pakistan, the Presbyterian Church of Pakistan and the Church of Pakistan to train pastors and ministers.

== Doctrine ==
The Church motto says: "Whoever believes on HIM will not be put to shame".

=== Creeds ===
- Apostles Creed
- Athanasian Creed
- Nicene Creed

=== Confessions ===
- Westminster Confession of Faith (1647)
- Westminster Shorter Catechism (1647)

== See also ==
- Protestantism in Pakistan
- Presbyterian Church of Pakistan
