= List of churches in Pakistan =

This is a list of churches throughout Pakistan, at present. It is a dynamic list, in alphabetical order by names of cities/towns etc. and can be added to as per the accepted format below.

== Abbottabad ==
- The Presbyterian Church of Pakistan. The Mall, Abbottabad
- St. Luke's Church, Abbottabad

== Rawalpindi ==
- St. Paul's Church, Rawalpindi
- Christ Church Rawalpindi

== Bannu ==
- St. George's Church
- Bannu Roman Catholic Church

== Battagram ==
- Emmanuel Church, Battagram

== Dera Ismail Khan ==
- Saint Thomas' Church, Dera Ismail Khan

== Faisalabad ==
- Cathedral of Sts. Peter and Paul

== Hyderabad ==
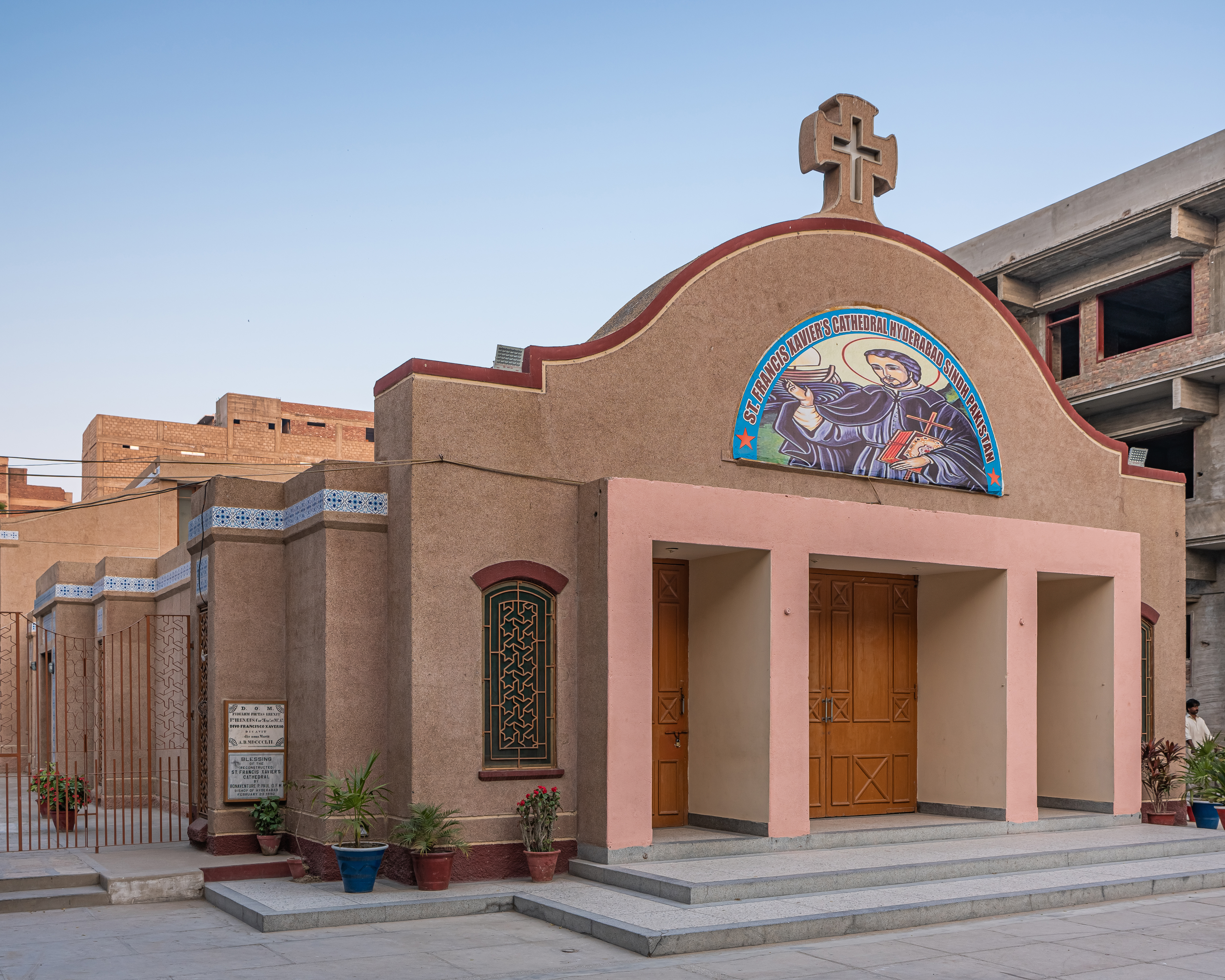
St. Francis Xavier Cathedral

- St. Francis Xavier Cathedral

== Islamabad ==
- Zamar Pentecostal Church Islamabad (Pentecostal/ Rev. Rizwan Khurshid.)
- Church of Jesus Christ of Latter-day Saints (Mormon)
- Assemblies of God Church, Islamabad PS Samson John)
- United Protestant Church of Pakistan; Bishop Dr. Emanuel Khokhar, Ph. D
- Reformed Pentecostal Church of Pakistan Christian Colony New Iqbal Town Islamabad

== Karachi ==
- Holy Trinity Cathedral
- Our Lady of Fatima Church
- Sacred Heart Church, Keamari
- St. Andrew's Church, also known as Scotch Church
- St. Anthony's Church, Cantt
- St. Francis' Church, Haji Camp
- St. Jude's Church
- St. Lawrence's Church
- St. Patrick's Cathedral
- St. Paul's Church, Manora
- Saint Patrick's Cathedral, Karachi
- Jesus Is The Answer Church Ministries, Karachi, Pakistan

== Lahore ==
- Asim Emmanuel Ministries
- Sacred Heart Cathedral on The Mall Road
- St. Andrew's Church
- St. Andrew's Presbyterian Church on Nabha Road
- St. Anthony's Church, The Mall
- St. Joseph's Church
- St. Mary's Church
- Cathedral Church of Resurrection
- Samaritan's Fellowship Church
- St. Marqas Pentecostal Church, Bilal Town, Raiwind Road, Lahore
- Jesus Is The Answer Church, Baghbanpura, Mian Rehman Park Multani Colony, Lahore
- Dorothy Memorial Church, Canal Park, Gulberg II, Lahore
- Victory Churches of Pakistan

== Multan ==
- Cathedral of the Holy Redeemer
- Jesus Is The Answer Church Ministries, Multan Pakistan
- Old Catholic Church in Pakistan

== Nathia Gali ==
- St. Matthew's Church, Nathia Gali - seasonal only (see St.Luke's Church, Abbottabad, above)

== Peshawar ==
- All Saints Church
- St. John's Church (now called St John's Cathedral)
- St Michael's Church

== Sialkot ==
- Sialkot Cathedral
- Assemblies of God Church
- The Word Ministries Christ City Church Bhoth Sialkot

== Thandiani ==
- St. Xavier in the Wilderness - seasonal only (see St.Luke's Church, Abbottabad, above)

== Vehari ==
- Jesus Is The Answer Church Ministries, Vehari, Pakistan
