= Catholic Naqib =

Magazine of the Roman Catholic Archdiocese of Lahore, Pakistan

- Format: Fortnightly
- Founder(s): Fr. Livinus Caeymen Bavo, OFMCap, and the Catholic Archdiocese of Lahore
- Publisher: Naqib Printing Press
- Editor: Khalid Rehmat
- Associate editor: Rana Tabassum, former Assistant Editor and Manager
- Founded: 1929
- Language: Urdu اردو
- City: Lahore
- Country: Pakistan

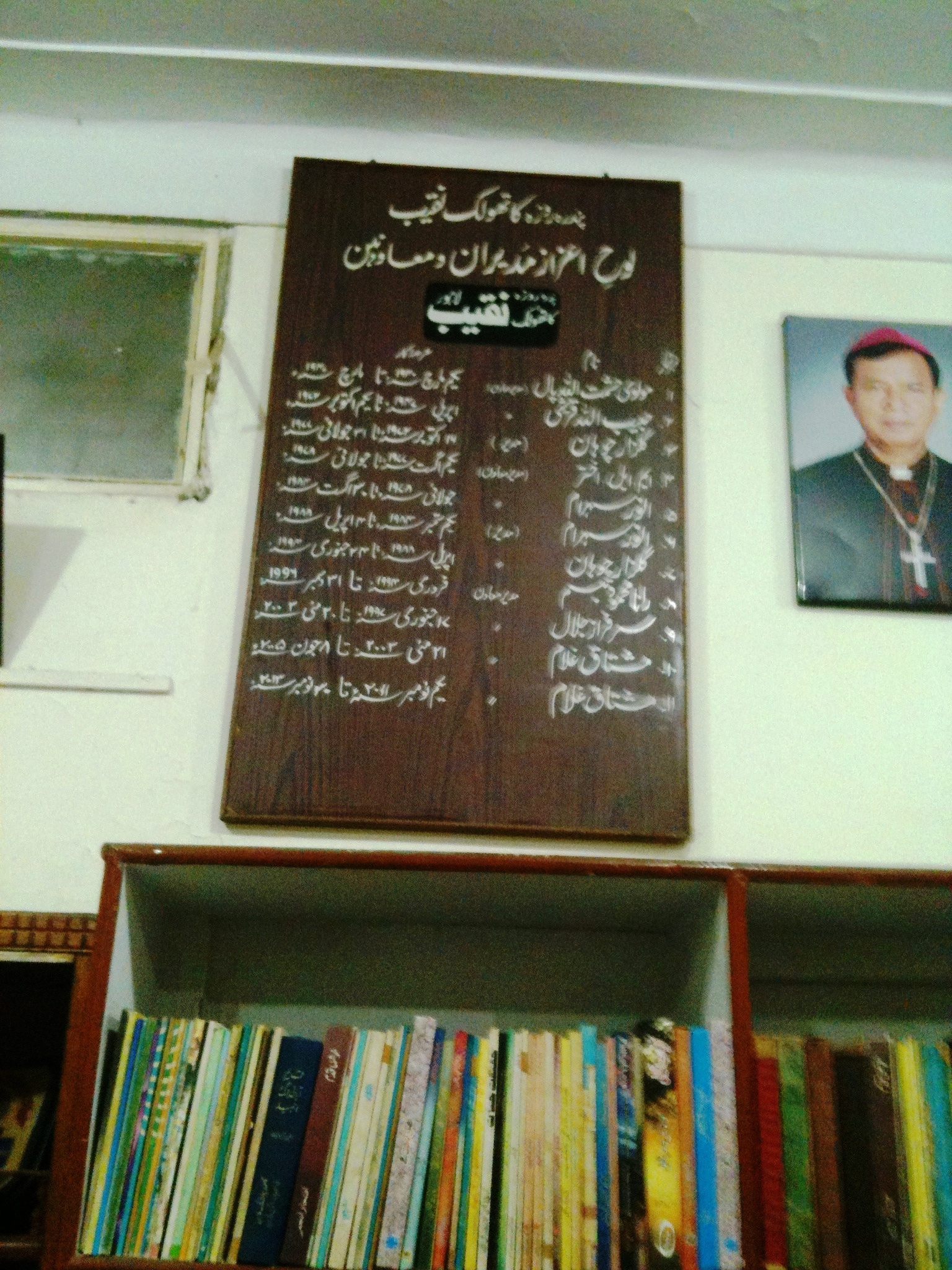

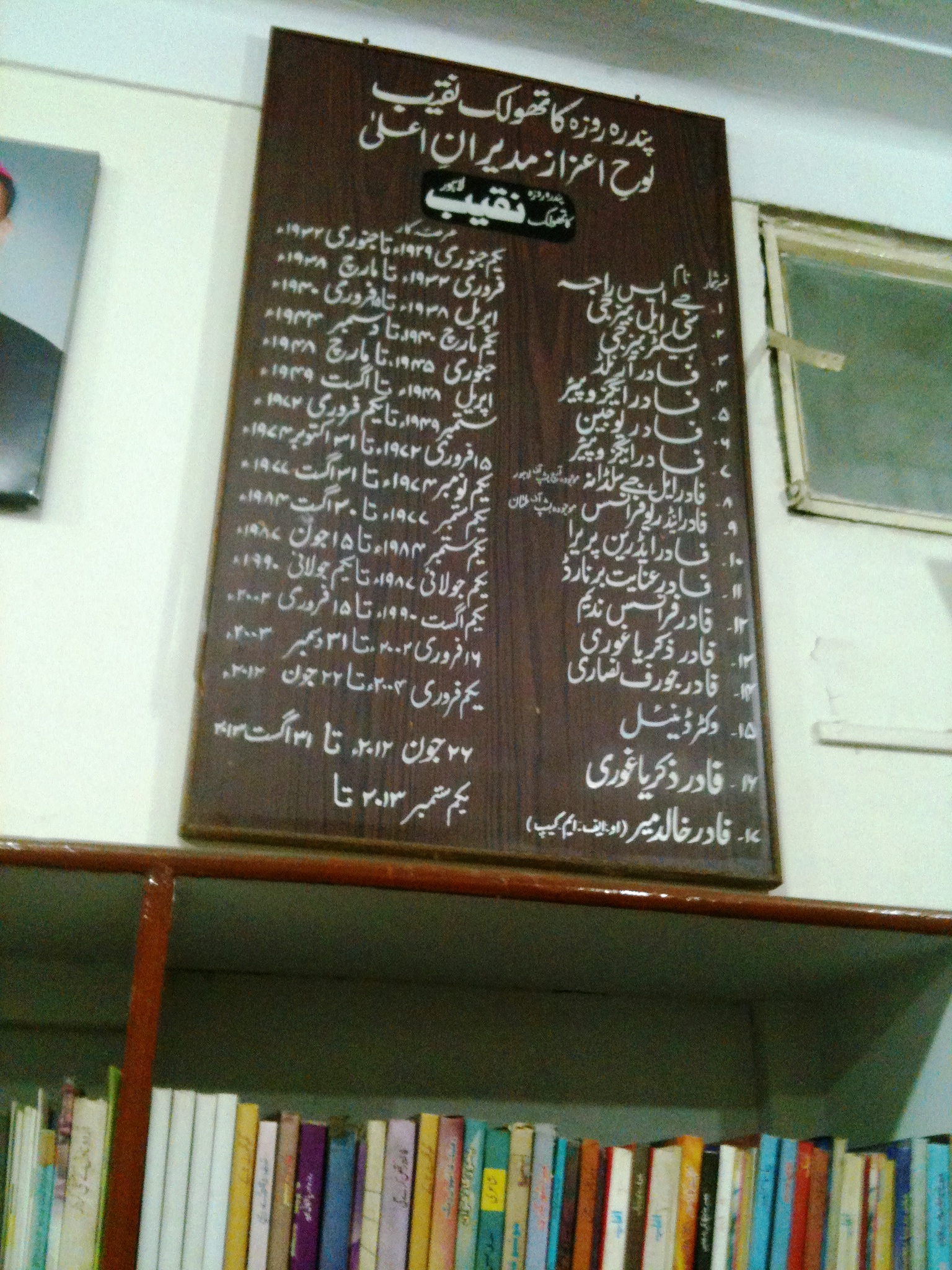

The Catholic Naqib (Urdu: کاتھولک نقیب) is the oldest Urdu-language Catholic magazine, founded in Lahore, Pakistan in 1929 by the Roman Catholic Archdiocese of Lahore (a diocese at the time of the founding of the magazine). It was originally published by Lahore Press, but since 1997 by Naqib Printing Press. Naqib is an Arabic name that means "herald" or "proclaimer."

== Early years ==
According to Gulzar Chohan, a former editor of Catholic Naqib, the magazine was first launched in 1916 as an Urdu newsletter, written by a Belgian Capuchin priest. At the same time, an English weekly, Catholic News, was published from the Lahore Diocese under the patronage of Bishop Fabian Eestermans.

The founder of Catholic Naqib, Father Livinus Caeymen Bavo, OFMCap, was part of the first team of Belgian Capuchin missionaries in West Punjab, now Punjab, in Pakistan. Emphasizing the promotion of Christian literature in India and supporting its publication in local languages, he was not only the founder of Catholic Naqib but also a founder of the Punjab Vernacular Society (1922), which was established to provide stationery to the parishes and also printed the magazine. Father Livinus established a board of publication that included Fathers Victorius Banken Gerardus, Desiderius Sury Carolus, and Vincentius Stevens Daniel.

== Later developments ==
When the Diocese of Lahore was promoted to the status of archdiocese in 1990, Archbishop Armando Trindade, formerly the bishop of Lahore before his concurrent promotion, became a patron of the Catholic Naqib. He installed the magazine's first directly owned printing press.

The archbishop also set up two boards to run the magazine, an editorial and a managing board. The editorial board, headed by Father Zicheria Ghauri, a parish priest of Narowal, was responsible for the magazine's content. The managing board, headed by Raymond Razario, the former director of Caritas Lahore (also known as Caritas Pakistan Lahore), oversaw the financial aspects of the institute and its staff. Rana Tabassum was the coordinator of these boards and in charge of meetings.

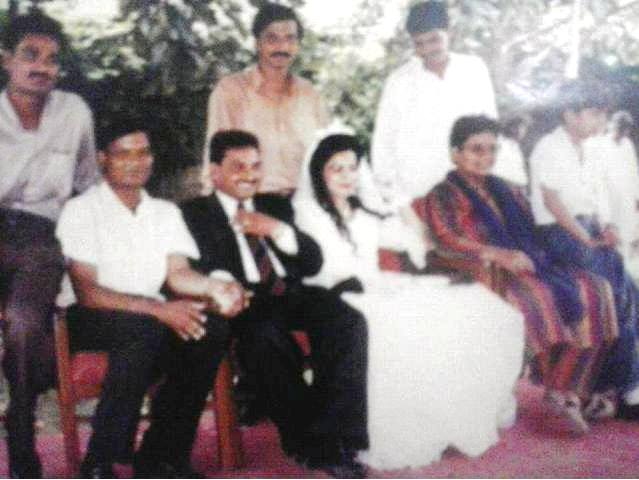
The Catholic Naqib's marketing team during 1994 at the marriage of Rana Tabassum

A marketing team, also headed by Rana Tabassum, was hired to work on commission and partial salary with travel allowance. The magazine's circulation increased to 5,000–6,000 copies, with Akhtar Ramzan (also the photo editor) and Akhtar Bhatti as the leading sales officers.

When an eventual price increase was deemed necessary, Archbishop Trindade disapproved of it because he felt it was at odds with the Catholic Naqib's motto regarding evangelization. But because the magazine was ineligible for ABC advertisements due to state advertising policy to avoid external influences, that source of revenue was unavailable.

During Archbishop Trindade's patronage of the magazine, the Naqib Media House carried out all activities, and the Naqib Forum was instituted. Programs with classical singers such as Ustad Hamid Ali Khan performed at the Naqib Forum Hall. This program was able to continue through donations from Father James Chanan, Provincial of the Dominican Order; Nathaniel Nawab, Principal of the Christian Technical College, Gujranwala; Former Fathers Saleem Anjum and Pascal Clement, Assistant Rector and Rector, respectively, of the Capuchin Minor Seminary, Lahore; Father Abid Habib, Provincial of the Capuchin Order; and Lt. Col (ret.) L. C. Rath, Principal of Saint Anthony Boys School, Lahore and later Director of Bathania Hospital, Sialkot.

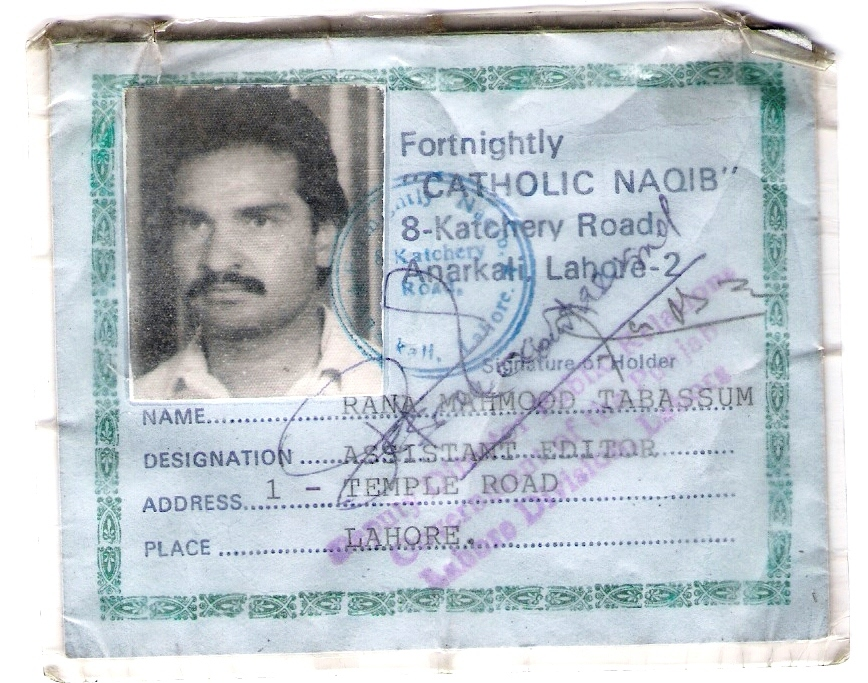
Catholic Naqib press card

In 1992 the Catholic Naqib acquired its first press card, designed and introduced by Rana Tabassum while he served the magazine as news editor as well as circulation manager. With the press card, access for the staff to cultural events and access to workplace became easier, at least during bike ride restrictions by traffic police.

Archbishop Emeritus Lawrence John Saldanha and Gulzar Chohan increased the Catholic Naqib's page count by adding a Naqib Digest section for women and children, with the intention that the Catholic Naqib would become a "real family magazine" under their oversight. Its first editors were Frida Durani and Nasirah Paul. Prior to their involvement, the publication had been largely devoted to Christian religious activities; but under their editorship, with the inclusion of the new digest, the magazine also covered social and political matters.

== Of note ==
Two editors of the Catholic Naqib, Andrew Francis and Lawrence John Saldanha went on to high ecclesiastical positions in Pakistan as Bishop Andrew Francis for the Diocese of Multan and Archbishop Lawrence John Saldanha for the Archdiocese of Lahore. As of 2021, Saldanha retired to Canada but continued to be involved with the magazine.

The Archbishop Emeritus and Gulzar Chohan increased the magazine's page count by adding a Naqib Digest section for women and children, with the intention that the Catholic Naqib would become a 'real family magazine' under their oversight. Its first editors were Frida Durani and Nasirah Paul. Prior to their involvement, the publication had been largely devoted to Christian religious activities; but under their editorship, with the inclusion of the new digest, the magazine also covered social and political matters..

Rana Tabassum, the former assistant editor and manager, is the only award-winner laureate editor among the Catholic Naqib's staff, receiving the "Media in Your Country award in 1998 at the UNESCO Center, Paris.

On March 11, 2008, a powerful bomb ripped open a government building in Lahore, killing at least 30 people and injuring about 200 more. The explosion caused serious damage to the Catholic Naqib office, Sacred Heart Cathedral, Sacred Heart High School for Boys, and Sacred Heart High School for Girls.

The Catholic Naqib celebrated its eightieth anniversary on May 16, 2009. Victor Daniel, Editor, board members, and the office staff received certificates of appreciation from Archbishop Lawrence Saldanha. There was great joy in the Archdiocese of Lahore for its ninetieth anniversary in 2019.
