= Francis Nadeem =

Pakistani priest (1955–2020)

The Reverend Francis Nadeem OFM Cap.
- Born: October 27, 1955; Gujranwala
- Died: July 3, 2020 (aged 64); Lahore
- Education: St. Mary's Minor Seminary, Lahore
- Occupation: Catholic priest
- Years active: 1986-2020
- Employer: Archdiocese of Lahore
- Known for: Chief editor of Catholic Naqib
- Notable work: Books on the contribution of Christians to Pakistan
- Board member of: National Council for Interfaith Dialogue, Lahore
- Awards: Tamgha-e-Imtiaz

Francis Nadeem, OFM Cap. (October 27, 1955 – July 3, 2020) was a Capuchin Franciscan priest who worked in the Archdiocese of Lahore in Pakistan.

== Early life ==
He was born in Gujranwala on October 27, 1955. In 1970, he joined the St. Mary's Minor Seminary, Lahore. He was ordained a priest on September 14, 1986.

== Career ==
He was chief editor of Catholic Naqib, the Urdu language Catholic journal, in 1989.

He was the Parish Priest of St. Mary's Church, Gulberg from 2000 to 2002.

Fr. Nadeem was nominated for an Independence Day Award on August 15, 2000 for outstanding service to the country. He published books on the contribution of Christians to Pakistan.

In 2004, he led Christian and Muslim representatives as they marched together along the India-Pakistan border in Kasur, 55 kilometres south of Lahore, to affirm their desire for peace in Kashmir and to support dialogue in both countries.

He was critical of the Ethics textbook for grade nine, approved and published by the Punjab Textbook Board, which lacks a chapter on Christianity and Jesus Christ, which he called open discrimination against Christians in Pakistan. Such efforts are marginalising minorities and making them feel like strangers in their country. He claimed that the extremism prevalent during the past few decades shows that forces are working to eliminate minorities from Pakistan.

President, General Pervez Musharraf, announced 150 Pakistan Civil Awards on 14 August 2006, including Tamgha-e-Imtiaz to Father Francis Nadeem for Public Service.

Father Nadeem, who headed the National Council for Interfaith Dialogue in Lahore, criticized the government for being "unclear" and "very silent" on extending dialogue with India. The priest said he had stopped participating in or organizing Kashmir rallies since the present government came to power in 2014.

Five Franciscan Capuchin brothers received their Solemn Profession at St. Francis Church, Kot Lakhpat, Lahore, on September 22, 2015. Custos of Mariam Siddeeqa Custody Pakistan Francis Nadeem administered the Solemn Profession while Morris Jalal and Fr. John Joseph OFM Cap were the concelebrants.

In 2015, Nadeem became the provincial of the Capuchin friars in Pakistan.

== Death ==
Nadeem died of a heart attack on July 3, 2020. More than 2,000 people attended his funeral at Sacred Heart Cathedral, Lahore concelebrated by three bishops and 100 priests.
