= National Marian Shrine, Mariamabad =

City in Punjab, Pakistan

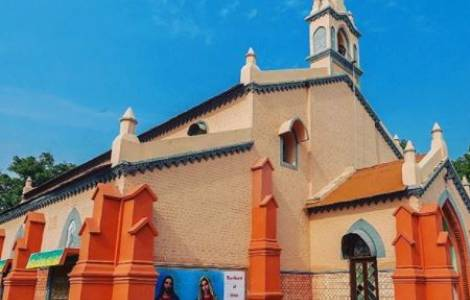
Façade of the shrine in Mariamabad.

The National Marian Shrine in Mariamabad, Sheikhupura District, Pakistan is a National Shrine, and since 1949, has been the site of an annual pilgrimage on September 8 for the Feast of the Nativity of Mary.

Approximately 2 million Catholics of Pakistan these are days of celebration. Many of them, in recent days, have taken to the road on a journey to Mariamabad, which means the ”City of Mary” in the Urdu language.

Known as one of Pakistan's oldest Catholic settlements, it is about 80 km from the Punjab's capital of Lahore. Covering an area of 835 hectares (2,060 acres), Mariamabad has become an important pilgrimage site for over one million believers annually.

Mariamabad was founded in 1892. Observing the misery and oppression of the newly converted Christians in the District of Sialkot, Capuchin Bp Emmanuel Van Den Bosch purchased 150 acres (0.61 km^{2}) of government land for 650,000 rupees (US$29,545) for Christians to live and work on. In January 1893, a 'Long march' of six days (170 km) led by Capuchin fathers Godefroid Pelckmans and another, took three Christian families to the new land, named Maryabad, in Punjab. This event is often compared to the Biblical Exodus and has a particular significance in the history of the local Christian community. The Capuchins built the Church of Saint Mary and Saint Joseph on December 8, 1898.

A prominent feature of the shrine is the Marian grotto on a hill, where a three-and-a-half-meter statue of the Virgin Mary stands.

There are stalls selling religious posters and cards, crosses, rosaries, candles, incense sticks and other religious objects, as well as cold drinks, food, and sweets to cater to the pilgrims that travel from all over Pakistan and even overseas.

On September 10, 2005, armed men waiting near the village stopped buses bringing pilgrims, and robbed the passengers of their valuables. The Catholic National Commission for Justice and Peace also filed a formal complaint with the police against the persons who looted buses, manhandled and searched women, and desecrated a cross.

In September 2005, Catholics from across Pakistan took part in the country's first-ever National Eucharistic Congress. More than 100,000 Catholics came to publicly honour the Eucharist during the three-day event. The event was organised under the guidance of Lawrence Saldanha, the then-Archbishop of Lahore, president of the Pakistan Catholic Bishops’ Conference.

In 2006, the parish priest was Father Emanuel Bernard.

Arif Sadiq carries people from Saint Paul's Parish in Lahore to the Shrine in his pickup truck for free. He has been doing this since 1996.

More than a million people visited the shrine in September 2019 to celebrate its 70th anniversary including Archbishop Christophe Zakhia El-Kassis, Apostolic Nuncio to Pakistan, who blessed a new altar at the shrine, and Sebastian Shaw, Archbishop of Lahore, who unveiled the latest edition of an Urdu-language Catholic Bible.

In January 2021, the Government of Punjab announced the construction of a 4.1-kilometer road from Sheikhupura to Mariamabad to make it easier for pilgrims to travel to the Shrine.
