= List of schools in Pakistan =

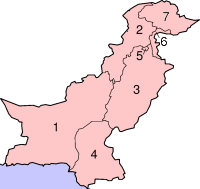
Administrative units of Pakistan: 1. Balochistan province; 2. Khyber-Pakhtunkhwa province; 3. Punjab province; 4. Sindh province; 5. Islamabad Capital territory; 6. Azad Kashmir territory; 7. Gilgit–Baltistan territory

The following is a list of schools in Pakistan, categorized by province/territory and by district.

== Azad Jammu & Kashmir ==
=== Mirpur ===
- Fauji Foundation Model School
- Roots School System
- Dar-e-Arqam Schools
- The City School

=== Bhimber ===
- Army Public School and College
- Dar-e-Arqam Schools
- READ Foundation College

=== Rawalakot ===
- Dar-e-Arqam Schools
- The Educators

== Gilgit–Baltistan ==
=== Skardu ===
- Army Public School and College
- Cadet College

== Khyber Pakhtunkhwa ==
=== Dera Ismail Khan ===
- Army Public School and College, D.I.Khan
- The City School, D.I.Khan
- The Educators, D.I.Khan
- Dar-e-Arqam School, D.I.Khan
- The City School

=== Kohat ===
- Garrison Cadet College Kohat

=== Mansehra ===
- Army Public School and College
- Dar-e-Arqam Schools
- Fauji Foundation
- Mansehra International Public School and College
- Government Post Graduate College, Mansehra

=== Nowshera ===
- The City School, Nowshera Cantt

=== Peshawar ===
- The City School, Peshawar Campus
- Pak-Turk Maarif International Schools & Colleges
- Presentation Convent School, Peshawar
- St. Mary's High School, Peshawar

=== Swat ===
- Catholic Public High School, Sangota
- The City School, College Colony, Saidu Sharif

== Punjab ==
=== Burewala ===
- Tehzeeb-ul-Itfal Model School Burewala

=== Gujranwala ===
- St Joseph's English High School'

=== Lahore ===
- Sacred Heart High School for Boys
- Sacred Heart High School for Girls, Lahore
- St Francis High School, Lahore
- Lahore Grammar School
- Aitchison College
- Froebels
- Army Public School
- Roots Milleninum School
- Beaconhouse School System
- Divisional Public School
- Keynesian Institute of Management & Sciences (KIMS)

=== Multan ===
- La Salle High School Multan
- Lahore Grammar School

=== Murree ===
- Presentation Convent High School, Murree

=== Jhelum ===
- Presentation Convent School, Jhelum
- St. Thomas' High School, Jhelum

=== Toba Tek Singh ===
- St. Peter's High School, Pakistan

=== Gujrat ===
- Govt High School Bhagwal

== Sindh ==
=== Ghotki ===
- The Educators (a project of Beaconhouse School System)

=== Nawabshah ===
- The City School, Senior Branch, Society
- People's School Program (a project of SEF)
- Foundation Public School (FPS Nwbh)

=== Khairpur ===
- The City School

=== Larkana ===
- The Educators (a project of Beaconhouse School System)
- SZABIST intermediate college, Sachal colony Larkana

== Balochistan ==
=== Quetta ===
- St Francis Grammar School
- St. Joseph's Convent School, Quetta
- Army Public Schools & Colleges System

== See also ==
- Army Public Schools & Colleges System
