= Akash Bashir =

Pakistani Servant of God (1994–2015)

Servant of God Akash Bashir
- Born: 22 June 1994; Risalpur, Pakistan
- Died: 15 March 2015 (aged 20); Lahore, Pakistan
- Cause of death: Blast injury

Akash Bashir (22 June 1994 – 15 March 2015) was a Pakistani layman and a former student of the Don Bosco Technical Institute in Lahore, Pakistan. In December 2014, he joined the security team in charge of protecting the Church of Saint John in Lahore, in the predominantly Christian neighborhood of Youhanabad. On Sunday, 15 March 2015, he blocked a suicide bomber who was about to enter the church. The bomber detonated his bomb outside the church, killing both of them. In January 2022, the cause for his beatification was opened and he was named a Servant of God by Pope Francis.

== Life ==
Bashir was born in the village of Risalpur. He was the second-youngest child and had an older sister and three brothers. As an infant, he was physically malnourished and struggled to survive his first summer alive. Due to religious persecution against Christians in the area, his family moved across the country to Lahore. He studied at Salesian schools in Pakistan in Youhanabad, the Christian quarter of the city of Lahore. In 2014 he volunteered as a security guard for the Church of Saint John. Being just over 18, he was the youngest security guard at the church and had to receive special permission from the priest.

== Suicide bombing attempt ==
On 15 March 2015, two suicide bombers went to the Church of Saint John and the Christ Church of the Church of Pakistan, an Anglican church. Bashir, who was guarding the Church of Saint John on that day and having heard the explosion at the Anglican church, identified the bomber and stopped him at the door. Akash's last words were "If I have to die, I'll die, but I won't let you in." He hugged the suicide bomber before the bomb exploded, killing him and two other Christians. Inside the church were roughly 1500 people, all but three of whom went unharmed. Pope Francis named him a "Servant of God" for the sacrifice he made in saving innocent human lives from this terrorist attack. Including those killed by the bomb set off at Christ Church of the Church of Pakistan, Seventeen people were killed and about 70 were injured. Fourteen killed were at the Anglican church, and three at the Catholic church, one of whom was a young girl. Terrorist group Tehreek-e-Taliban Pakistan Jamaatul Ahrar later claimed responsibility for the attacks.

Akash Bashir's funeral began the day after he died. Archbishop of Lahore Sebastian Francis Shaw presided over his funeral Mass. Reportedly hundreds of people venerated him in the streets as a "hero." Due to the connotation of the word martyr in Pakistan with Islam, Christian martyrs are usually called "heroes." After he died, an anonymous Muslim family, in an apparent gesture of good will, sent Akash's family a large block of marble, which is something difficult to acquire in Pakistan. Akash's father used the marble to build a headstone for him. Akash was buried in the parish graveyard.

== Cause of beatification ==
On 31 January 2022, the beatification process of Akash Bashir was introduced by the Archdiocese of Lahore. Pope Francis declared Bashir a Servant of God. He is the second native Pakistani Servant of God in the history of the Catholic Church in Pakistan, after the martyred Catholic politician Clement Shahbaz Bhatti who was assassinated in 2011.

According to Gabriel Cruz, a Salesian missionary priest in Pakistan, "immediately after his [Bashir's] death, people made a small altar in front of the church where he died, as a sign of gratitude". After his passing, there was an increase in young men signing up as security guards at Catholic churches. Additionally, the Anglicans at the neighboring church built a memorial for him; many of the Anglican families attend the same school as the Catholics. Some Muslims have also publicly paid his memorial respects.

== See also ==
- Lahore church bombings
