= Khalid Rehmat =

Pakistani Catholic apostolic vicariate

Khalid Rehmat OFMCap
- Archbishop of Lahore
- Church: Roman Catholic Church
- Archdiocese: Lahore
- See: Archdiocese of Lahore
- In office: 2026 -
- Predecessor: Sebastian Francis Shaw OFM
- Previous post: Apostolic Vicar of Quetta in Pakistan

Orders
- Ordination: 16 August 2008
- Consecration: 25 March 2021 by Archbishop Christophe Zakhia El-Kassis, Cardinal Joseph Coutts, Archbishop Joseph Arshad
- Rank: Archbishop

Personal details
- Born: August 5, 1968 (age 58) Mianwali, Punjab
- Motto: “Service, peace and development”

Father Khalid Rehmat OFMCap (born 5 August 1968) in the Roman Catholic Diocese of Islamabad-Rawalpindi, is the Apostolic Vicar of the Apostolic Vicariate of Quetta in Pakistan.

Rehmat worked as a primary school teacher before joining the Order of Friars Minor Capuchin. From 2008 to 2014 he taught at St. Mary's Minor Seminary, Lahore.

He made his solemn vows in 2007. On 16 August 2008, he was ordained priest in the Sacred Heart Cathedral, Lahore. From 2014, Rehmat served as parish priest in Our Lady of Mount Carmel parish in Sialkot, in the Archdiocese of Lahore. Since 2013, he has been editor of the bimonthly magazine Catholic Naqeeb. In November 2020, he was elected custos of the Mariam Siddeeqa Capuchin Custody in Pakistan.

On January 1, 2021, Pope Francis named Father Khalid Rehmat as the new vicar apostolic of Quetta. He is the first Pakistani Capuchin priest to be named bishop and was consecrated in Quetta on 25 March 2021. Archbishop Christophe Zakhia El-Kassis, Apostolic Nuncio to Pakistan, was the main consecrator, with the co-consecrators Cardinal Joseph Coutts, Archbishop of Karachi, and Archbishop Joseph Arshad of Islamabad-Rawalpindi.

On March 10, 2026, Pope Leo XIV appointed him the Archbishop of Lahore. He was installed as Archbishop on March 28, 2026.
