= Catholic TV (Pakistan) =

- Country: Pakistan
- Headquarters: Lahore

Programming
- Language: Urdu

Ownership
- Owner: Archdiocese of Lahore
- Sister channels: YouTube channel of Radio Veritas Asia Urdu Service

History
- Founded: 2009
- Founder: Father Morris Jalal
- Closed: 22 September 2016
- Replaced by: Youtube and Facebook
- Former names: Good News Catholic TV

Availability

Streaming media
- Youtube channel: https://www.youtube.com/channel/UC9fTiDS-PlfeolufeG6HBMQ
- Facebook channel: https://www.facebook.com/pages/category/TV-Channel/Catholic-TV-Pakistan-457587067957290/

Good News Catholic TV was established in 2009 and was the first Catholic television broadcast channel in Pakistan. The cable channel and other Christian broadcasts were banned by the government of Pakistan in 2016. Good News Catholic TV continues on via a website with videos.

The introduction of Catholic TV supported the church's evangelisation efforts through the media, supplementing the Urdu service of Radio Veritas Asia. Radio Veritas has been broadcasting an Urdu service for Pakistan and India since 14 August 1987.

It was started by Father Morris Jalal, who visited families and attended church functions in the Roman Catholic Archdiocese of Lahore carrying a video camera to document the community's life for the first Catholic TV channel in Pakistan. The founder and executive director of Catholic TV made the service available round-the-clock on a local cable channel.

Programming includes Christian films, documentaries on church activities, talk shows, interviews, holy songs, rosary recitation, Bible quiz competitions and live Sunday Mass.

The program was broadcast in a radius of 10 kilometers from the central Lahore compound of St. Francis Parish, an area in which an estimated 8,000 Catholic families live. The government's media regulatory body has not approved a permit for any Christian radio, TV or news service, and state-owned Pakistan Television grants Christians only two 30-minute slots a year for Christmas and Easter programs.

Catholic communicators have found their way around Pakistani unwillingness to give airspace to the Church, taking advantage of cable and Internet to broadcast their message. The first Catholic TV channels in Pakistan have been endorsed by Archbishop Lawrence Saldanha of Lahore, president of the National Center for Social Communications.

The country’s first Catholic television channel celebrated its first anniversary by honoring its anchors, all of them volunteers. More than 500 people gathered for the 28 April 2010 program at St. Francis Church in Lahore. Catholic TV, a round-the-clock local cable service, has expanded to include shows on human rights abuses, current affairs, Christian personalities and programs about the lifestyle of clergy. Catholic TV is totally funded by local Catholics. Auxiliary Bishop Sebastian Francis Shah of Lahore who spoke at the event said that such media are necessary to strengthen peoples’ faith.

An order issued by the government Pakistan Electronic Media Regulatory Authority on 22 September 2016, declared 11 Christian television channels broadcasting in Pakistan in Urdu, including Catholic TV, as illegal. Jasber Ashiq, director of Catholic TV, said they had had to look to alternatives like Facebook and YouTube to stream programs.

In 2019, Catholic TV has expanded to three dioceses: Lahore, Hyderabad and Faisalabad. It is estimated to have around half a million viewers in Lahore alone. In August 2019 it is showcasing Rising Stars, a song competition that made its debut in 2010, becoming Pakistan’s first TV talent show for Christian youths aged 15 to 20.

During the 2020 pandemic, Catholic TV provided daily live streaming of the Mass from the Archbishop's house in Lahore. An estimated 6,000 people watched the Mass while churches remain closed.

== See also ==
- Catholic television
- Catholic television channels
- Catholic television networks
