= Padri Jo Goth =

Village in Sindh, Pakistan

- Village
- Location within Pakistan
- Coordinates: 26°43′48″N 68°57′0″E
- Country: Pakistan
- District: Sanghar District
- Established: 1938

Population (2018)
  - Total: 8,965
- Time zone: UTC+5 (PST)

Padri Jo Goth is a village in Sanghar District, Sindh, Pakistan.

== History ==
The village consists of around 500 families living on land bought by the Catholic Church in 1938. Franciscan Father Dildar Micheal is the parish priest in 2023. The Faithful Companions of Jesus Sisters also run a dispensary out of their St. Alverna Convent. The St Isidore high school run by the Franciscan Sisters of the Heart of Jesus provides education to the community up to the 10th grade. In 2023 some 450 disadvantaged children are receiving an education at the school funded by Catholic Missions.

== Local violence ==
The marriage of a young tribal Hindu woman and a Christian man she chose angered her community in 2004. This led to friction between the two communities.

In 2012, a mother of two was set on fire by her in-laws over a domestic dispute. In 2013 a Muslim man wanted to marry a Catholic nurse from the village. He approached her with a proposal to marry him and convert to Islam. When she turned him down, he threatened to abduct her and disfigure her with acid.

== Current events ==
The Mission Fund in Malta provided financial help to the local families who lost their homes and belongings in the 2013 flood.

On 19 June 2020, St. Isidore's parish participated in the 11th World Rosary Relay. The parish priest at the time was Fr Felix de Souza OFM.

== Notables ==
- Bishop Sebastian Francis Shaw, appointed Archbishop of Lahore in 2013,
