= Ernest Bertrand Boland =

American priest (1925–2023)

His Excellency, The Most Reverend Ernest Bertrand Boland
- Bishop Emeritus of Multan
- Church: Roman Catholic
- Archdiocese: Lahore
- Diocese: Multan
- Appointed: May 17, 1966
- Installed: July 25, 1966
- Term ended: October 20, 1984
- Predecessor: Aloysius Louis Scheerer
- Successor: Patras Yusaf

Orders
- Ordination: June 9, 1955 by Jerome Hannan
- Consecration: July 25, 1966 by Russell McVinney, Bernard Matthew Kelly and Fulton J. Sheen

Personal details
- Born: July 10, 1925 Providence, Rhode Island, U.S.
- Died: May 28, 2023 (aged 97) Pawtucket, Rhode Island, U.S.
- Motto: Household of God

Styles of Ernest Bertrand Boland
- Reference style: His Excellency; The Most Reverend
- Spoken style: Your Excellency
- Religious style: Bishop

Ernest Bertrand Boland OP (July 10, 1925 – May 28, 2023) was an American Roman Catholic bishop.

Boland was born in Providence, Rhode Island. Boland went to Providence College and joined the Dominican order in 1949. He was ordained to the priesthood on June 9, 1955. He was a high school teacher in Columbus, Ohio. He was appointed bishop of the Roman Catholic Diocese of Multan, Pakistan and was consecrated on May 17, 1966. Boland served as bishop of the Multan Diocese until 1984. He had lived at Providence College since 1995 and had assisted the bishop of the Roman Catholic Diocese of Providence.

Boland died in Pawtucket, Rhode Island, on May 28, 2023, at the age of 97.

== Notes ==
Catholic Church titles
Preceded by Aloysius Louis Scheerer	Bishop of Multan; 1966–1984	Succeeded by Patras Yusaf
