= St. Mary's Church, Gulberg =

St. Mary’s Church
- Location: Gulberg, Lahore
- Country: Pakistan
- Denomination: Roman Catholic

History
- Consecrated: 1961

Administration
- Archdiocese: Archdiocese of Lahore

St. Mary's Church is a Roman Catholic church in Gulberg, Pakistan. It was founded in 1961 in the Roman Catholic Archdiocese of Lahore.

The parish priest from 2000 to 2002 was Fr. Francis Nadeem, OFMCap The parish priest in 2020 is Fr. Patrick Samuel, OFMCap

== Programs ==
The parish hosts five youth groups whose activities are Prayer, Bible Sharing, Promoting Awareness of Catechism, Education, Peace and Social Harmony.

The Parish is also home to the Family Fellowship Forum. The forum is attended by about 100 couples. It meets every two months to discuss issues such as tolerance in the family, children's formation, values and education. Father Morris Jalal started the forum after parishioners sought counselling from him about their family problems. The priest stressed the need to implement such programs in city parishes, where people do not even know their neighbours. St. Mary's Parish has about 2,200 families, 40 percent of which moved tere from areas outside Lahore.

The parish has a college scholarship fund. St. Mary's Church held its fourth annual fund-raising event, titled Deep Say Deep Jalao (lighting one lamp after another), during the evening of June 10, 2006. That year, the parish raised 344,000 rupees (US$5,743).

The program helped three young parishioners to get nursing training at hospitals and four others who went to study at the Don Bosco Technical Institute, Lahore.

Another accomplishment was the opening of the Tarbiyat (training) Centre in the Parish in 2007, which had the aim of empowering parishioners through knowledge of their own and other religions. The centre's main resource base is its collection of 2,000 books in English and Urdu on Christianity, Islam, Hinduism, Sikhism and Taoism. The library also contains books on culture, philosophy and sociology, as well as 200 compact discs. In addition, the centre has a computer with Internet access.

Capuchin Father Eubert Pollentier served in the archdiocese for 48 years.
