= Pastoral Institute of Multan =

Pakistani catholic church training body

The Pastoral Institute of Multan, Pakistan, is aimed at aiding the local church grow into a church of witness and mission.

The objective is to aid the lay person to witness to Gospel values, be formative in the faith and an agent of change.

Established in 1971 as a catechetical-pastoral training body, the institute has since developed into a multifunctional center. The staff includes two foreign Dominicans and three lay people, two of them women.

The institute has a 12-member board of directors: the Catholic Bishop of Multan, director of the Pastoral Institute; the Bishop of the Church of Pakistan in Multan; four representatives of other Christian institutions involved in lay formation; two members appointed by the Roman Catholic Diocese of Multan; a nominee of the Dominican vice provincial and two members co-opted by the chairperson.

Although a diocesan institution, the pastoral institute serves the church more at the national level than at the local level. Programs are planned with priorities and goals in mind. There have always been those regular courses for religion teachers, catechists, basic Christian formation and inter-community formation for religious sisters. Also run are regular short programs for youth, women, nurses, primary health care and school-going boys and girls.

Focus, the publication of the pastoral institute for the past 16 years, is an organ of the Conference of Major Religious Superiors. This English review carries articles on selected themes chosen by a board of editors as well as information about local Church activities.

Achchha Charwaha (Good Shepherd), an Urdu magazine, is meant to aid catechists, religion teachers and other part-time church workers. It keeps them in touch with current techniques and approaches in their area of work and knowledge.

In November 1983 a conference on Contextual Theology was held at the Institute.

Christian-Muslim dialogue is another function of the institute. A group of Christians and Muslims meets monthly during which members share ideas and experiences on a selected topic. This provides an opportunity to the members of the two religions to meet and understand one another, thus lessening their differences and misunderstandings.

The general manager of the Institute in 1987 was Francis Daniel. From 1980 to 1996, Father Chrysostom Macvey OP was director of the Institute. From 1996 on Father Raphael Mahanga OP was director. In 2007, Father James Channan OP was director of the Institute. In 2015 Fr. Dr. Jamshed Albert OP is appointed new director of the Pastoral Institute.

The Pastoral Institute celebrated its silver jubilee in 1995.

The Institute also runs a nine-month training course for religion teachers. By 2001, 15 batches of teachers had been trained.

The first seminar in the country keyed to the Synod on the Bible to be held at the Vatican in October 2008, "The Importance of the Bible in the Life of the Faithful", was held August 20–23, 2007, at the Institute. Bishop Andrew Francis of Multan celebrated Mass on the last day of the seminar and urged the participants to introduce the theme of the synod to others.
