= Patras Yusaf =

His Grace Patras Yusaf
- Bishop of Roman Catholic Diocese of Multan
- Church: Roman Catholic
- See: Roman Catholic Diocese of Multan
- In office: 1982 – 1998
- Predecessor: Ernest Bertrand Boland, O.P.
- Successor: Andrew Francis
- Previous post: Auxiliary Bishop of Multan

Orders
- Ordination: 29 December 1965
- Consecration: 19 February 1982 by Bishop Francesco Benedetto Cialeo, O.P. Bishop Paolo Vieri Andreotti, O.P. Bishop Ernest Bertrand Boland, O.P.

Personal details
- Born: July 29, 1936 Francisabad, Pakistan
- Died: December 29, 1998 (aged 62)

Patras Yusaf was the Bishop of the Roman Catholic Diocese of Multan, Pakistan, from 1984 until his death in 1998.

Yusaf was born in Francisabad, Pakistan on 29 July 1936. He received his religious training at the Christ the King Seminary (Pakistan) and was ordained a priest on 29 December 1965.

He was appointed as vicar general of Faisalabad diocese in 1970. He obtained a degree in moral theology in Rome in 1976, after which he taught at Christ the King Seminary in Karachi. He also wrote a book in the Urdu language on the Christian family. He served as the fourth national director of Caritas Pakistan from 1986 to 1998.

On 19 December 1981 Pope John Paul II appointed him Auxiliary Bishop of Multan. He was ordained Bishop on 19 February 1982. He was appointed Bishop of Multan on 20 October 1984.

In 1989 he also served on the Muslim Christian Dialogue and Major Seminary commissions of the Catholic Bishops' Conference of Pakistan.

On December 28, 1990, he celebrated the silver jubilee of his priestly ordination, with Mass at the Holy Redeemer Cathedral in Multan.

In 1998, Bishop Patras became ill with diabetes and high blood pressure. Pope John Paul II appointed Father Raymond Saeed apostolic administrator for the diocese.

Bishop Patras died on 29 December 1998. His funeral service on January 13, 1998, was led by Bishop Joseph Coutts of Faisalabad in Yusaf's native village of Francisabad. He was buried in the compound of Multan's Holy Redeemer Cathedral.
