= Buyse =

Buyse is a surname of Belgian origin. Notable people with this surname include:

- Eric Buyse (1940–2019), Belgian footballer
- Fangio Buyse (born 1974), Belgian footballer
- Leone Buyse (born 1947), American classical flautist
- Marcel Roger Buyse (1892–1974)
