= St. Dominic's Church, Bahawalpur =

St. Dominic’s Church
- Location: Model Town, Bahawalpur
- Country: Pakistan
- Language: Urdu
- Denomination: Roman Catholic
- Tradition: Latin

History
- Consecrated: 1962
- Events: In 2001 four gunmen killed 15 worshippers and a police guard in the Church

Architecture
- Functional status: Active

Administration
- Metropolis: Lahore
- Diocese: Diocese of Multan

Clergy
- Bishop: Benny Mario Travas

St. Dominic's Church, Bahawalpur is in the Roman Catholic Diocese of Multan in Pakistan.

== History ==
The church of St. Dominic was built in 1962. The parish is also home to a convent, St. Dominic's Middle School for boys and the Dominican Convent School for girls. In Bahawalpur, there are about 2,000 Catholic families and about 250 Church of Pakistan families. The Church of Pakistan community has no place of worship of their own, so they were offered the use of St. Dominic's Church for their Sunday morning services.

Father Zafar Iqbal, the first Pakistani Dominican priest, was the parish priest of St. Dominic's Church until his death from a motorcycle crash on February 19, 2009.

== Shooting ==
On Sunday October 28, 2001, four gunmen entered the church and killed 17 pilgrims and a police guard. The gunmen are suspected of having been part of the Jaish-e-Mohammed militant group.

They were interred on October 30. Women, many survivors of the massacre, wept over white-shrouded coffins, each with a cross painted in red. It was the first massacre in the history of Pakistan's small Christian community.

In a pastoral letter, the Roman Catholic Bishops of Pakistan strongly condemned the act of terrorism in Bahawalpur during the Sunday service. Together with the bishops of the Church of Pakistan, they called for memorial services for the victims.

Pope John Paul II sent a special envoy, Archbishop Paul Josef Cordes, to show his concern for the welfare of all the people and offering his prayers for peace in this region. Messages were also received from the President of Pakistan, cabinet ministers, civil and military officials and concerned Muslim citizens.

Pakistani President General Pervez Musharraf also condemned the killings and urged police to trace the culprits and make arrests. Police made arrests in connection with the killings.

Bishop Andrew Francis of Multan reconsecrated St. Dominic's Church on November 15, 2001.

== Other events ==
Church leaders at St. Dominic parish have demanded that police arrest two men reportedly involved in a series of sexual assaults on poor women in the community. Dominican Fathers Rocus Patras and Rehmat Raja and Church social worker Samuel Masih made the demand and spoke about the case during a press conference on September 25, 2003. Father Patras was the parish priest at the time.

In December 2016, the Police Counter-Terrorism Department foiled yet another attempted attack on a St. Dominic's Church and arrested three terrorists.
