= Hector Catry =

French clergyman

Hector Catry (born 1889 in Ledeghem-lez-Courtrai) was a French clergyman and prelate for the Roman Catholic Archdiocese of Lahore. He was appointed bishop on 28 October 1928 succeeding Fabien Antoine Eestermans who was the previous bishop. He resigned in 1946, and died in 1972.
