= Godefroid Pelckmans =

Godefroid Pelckmans (born 1854 in Turnhout) was a Belgian clergyman and prelate for the Roman Catholic Archdiocese of Lahore, in British India. He was appointed bishop in 1893. On 18th January 1900 Pelckmans formally opened the Belgium Mission High School in the town of Dalwal when he blessed the school. The Sacred Heart Cathedral in Lahore was built after Pelckmans commissioned Antwerp architect Dubbeleere to build the structure.

== Death ==
Bishop Godefroid Pelckmans died on 3rd August 1904, and was succeeded by Fabien Antoine Eestermans as Bishop of Lahore.
