= Armando Trindade =

Pakistan Roman Catholic archbishop

His Grace Armando Trindade
- Archbishop of Roman Catholic Archdiocese of Lahore
- Church: Roman Catholic
- See: Roman Catholic Archdiocese of Lahore
- In office: 1973 – 2000
- Predecessor: Felicissimus Alphonse Raeymaeckers, O.F.M. Cap. †
- Successor: Lawrence John Saldanha
- Previous posts: Principal, St Paul's English High School

Orders
- Ordination: 6 May 1950
- Consecration: 7 October 1973 by Bishop Nicholas Hettinga M.H.M. †, Bishop of Rawalpindi

Personal details
- Born: 25 October 1927 Karachi, Pakistan
- Died: 31 July 2000 (aged 72)

Armando Trindade (born 25 October 1927 in Karachi, British India (now Pakistan)) studied at St Patrick's High School, Karachi. He received his religious training at the Papal Seminary, Kandy, Sri Lanka, and was ordained a priest on 6 May 1950.

He undertook graduate studies at Oxford University in England, and then attended Stanford University in the United States for his doctoral degree.

Until 1962 he was principal of the St Lawrence's Boys High School in Karachi. He went on to become principal of St Paul's English High School where he remained until 1973. He also edited Christian Voice, the archdiocesan weekly.

On 5 July 1973 Pope Paul VI appointed him auxiliary bishop of the Roman Catholic Archdiocese of Lahore, Pakistan. On 10 July 1975 he was appointed Bishop of Lahore and on 23 April 1994 the Archbishop of Lahore. He had also been president of the Catholic Bishops' Conference of Pakistan.

Archbishop Armando died on 31 July 2000. Over 100 priests and nuns with lighted candles escorted the archbishop's body to the Sacred Heart Cathedral, Lahore, in a procession before the funeral Mass on 5 August 2001.

Pakistan President Rafiq Tarar was reported to have said that "Pakistan has lost a great religious scholar and leader who served God through the Catholic Church and the people of Pakistan for over half a century with utmost dedication and commitment."

He was one of six children. His mother's name was Olinda. His fathers name was Crispino and he was a CPA. He has family in Canada, the United States, Australia, Singapore, Germany, and England.
