= Symphorien Mouard =

Symphorien Mouard (born 1828 in Sombernon) was a French clergyman and prelate for the Roman Catholic Archdiocese of Lahore. He was appointed bishop in 1888. He died in 1890.
