= Cathedral of the Holy Redeemer =

Church in Pakistan

Religion
- Affiliation: Roman Catholic
- Diocese: Diocese of Multan
- Leadership: Bishop Benny Travas; Father Shahzad Niamat, parish priest
- Year consecrated: 1940

Location
- Location: Multan, Pakistan
- Interactive map of Cathedral of the Holy Redeemer
- Coordinates: 30°10′57″N 71°25′54″E

Architecture
- Capacity: 2,000

The Cathedral of the Holy Redeemer is the main church of the Roman Catholic Diocese of Multan, Pakistan. Father Shahzad Niamat was the cathedral parish priest, and Father Shakeel John the assistant in 2008.

== History ==
The Diocese of Multan began as the Apostolic Prefecture of Multan, created on 17 December 1936 from the Diocese of Lahore. It was raised to a diocese on 20 July 1939. Its first prefect apostolic and first bishop was the Dominican Francesco Benedetto Cialeo, who was consecrated bishop on 29 October 1939. The cathedral was consecrated in October 1940, about fifteen months after the diocese was established.

On October 25, 1990, about 2,000 people participated in the golden jubilee celebration of Multan diocese at Holy Redeemer Cathedral. There was great rejoicing in the cathedral on 8 December 2004 as Bishop Andrew Francis ordained six priests of the diocese. On 23 September 2007 at the Holy Redeemer Cathedral, about 1,000 Catholics gathered to watch the official inauguration of the Padre Pio Health Centre on the cathedral grounds.

Besides the usual liturgical events, the cathedral hosts national and international events. On 6 June 2008, about 120 priests, nuns, youth leaders and other laypeople from Multan diocese's 18 parishes attended the local Catholic Church's first Diocesan Mission Congress (DMC). This was the first follow-up of the Asian Mission Congress that took place in Thailand from October 18–22, 2006.

During a visit to the Cathedral in April 2012, the Minister for National Harmony Dr Paul Bhatti lauded the design of the cathedral which is rich with symbols of interfaith harmony. In March 2020, Bishop Benny Mario Travas of Multan distributed COVID-19 emergency kits to the parish staff of the cathedral parish. The Church is making every attempt to encourage people to stay safe during the pandemic by following the guidelines of the local authorities.
