= Sacred Heart High School for Boys =

Location
- Lahore, Punjab; Pakistan

Information
- Type: Private primary and secondary school
- Religious affiliation(s): Catholicism
- Sister school: Sacred Heart High School for Girls, Lahore
- Oversight: Catholic Board of Education; Archdiocese of Lahore
- Principal: Ayaz James
- Gender: Boys
- Age: 5 to 16

Sacred Heart High School for Boys is a private Catholic primary and secondary school for boys located in Lahore, Pakistan. The school is administrated by the Roman Catholic Archdiocese of Lahore.

== History ==
Alexander Lewis was the principal of the school in 2008 and retired in February 2016.

On March 11, 2008, a powerful bomb ripped open a government building, killed at least 30 people and injured about 200 more, as well as damaging Catholic Church buildings in Lahore. The explosion caused serious damage to Sacred Heart Cathedral, Sacred Heart High School for Boys, Sacred Heart High School for Girls, and St. Anthony's College. Three schoolchildren died in the incident. More than 100 children were taken to hospitals for medical treatment.

Chief Minister Ejaz Nisar has said a high-level committee has been constituted to assess the damage done by the March 2008 suicide bombings in the city. Education Minister Mira Phailbus and Archbishop of Lahore Lawrence Saldanha were also present.

The school was one of several buildings damaged or destroyed by another bomb blast in Lahore in May 2009.
