= Felicissimus Raeymaeckers =

Felicissimus Raeymaeckers (born 1915 in Westmeerbeek) was a Belgian clergyman and prelate for the Roman Catholic Archdiocese of Lahore. He was appointed bishop in 1966. He resigned in 1975, and died in 1978.
