= Diocese of Multan =

Latin Catholic diocese in Pakistan

Coordinates: 30.0333°N 71.7500°E

Diocese of Multan Dioecesis Multanensis ملتان کے کیتھولک چرچ

Location
- Country: Pakistan
- Ecclesiastical province: Lahore
- Metropolitan: Lahore

Statistics
- Area: 98,705 km^{2} (38,110 sq mi)
- Population: Total; Catholics: (as of 2004); 32,167,000; 99,375 (0.3%)

Information
- Denomination: Catholic Church
- Sui iuris church: Latin Church
- Rite: Roman Rite
- Cathedral: Cathedral of the Holy Redeemer

Current leadership
- Pope: Leo XIV
- Bishop: Yousaf Sohan
- Metropolitan Archbishop: Khalid Rehmat

The Diocese of Multan (Lat: Dioecesis Multanensis) is a diocese of the Latin Church of the Catholic Church in Pakistan.

The diocese is located in the southern Punjab in a central part of Pakistan. The total population of the diocese is about 7.5 million, out of which Christians are about 200,000. The diocese of Multan covers an area of 100,705 km² and comprises the following civil boundaries. In the Multan Division, the districts of Multan, Vehari, Khanewal and Lodhran. In the Bahawalpur Division, the districts of Bahawalnagar, Bahawalnagar and Rahim Yar Khan. In the Dera Ghazi Khan Division the districts of Dera Ghazi Khan, Muzaffargarh, Layyah and Rajanpur.

In 1936 some adjacent districts of Multan and the State of Bahawalpur were detached from Lahore to form the prefecture Apostolic of Multan. In 1939 this area was detached from Lahore to become a separate diocese. In 1960 the diocese was divided and Bishop Cialeo moved to Faisalabad as the first bishop of the newly erected diocese of Faisalabad. Bishop Louis Scheerer was appointed the second bishop of Multan. In 1966 Bishop Louis Scheerer died and Bertrand Boland became the Bishop of Multan diocese. In 1984 Bishop Boland retired and handed over to his auxiliary Bishop Patras Yusaf. The diocese is a suffragan of the Archdiocese of Lahore.

The Cathedral of the Holy Redeemer is the main church of the Diocese.

The diocese is also home to the Pastoral Institute of Multan which serves the Church at a national level.

On 3 October 1989, Pope John Paul II sent congratulations on the 50th anniversary of the diocese. The diocese had 10 parishes with about 50,000 Catholics at the time. By June 2008 this had grown to 18 parishes.

On 17 September 1998, Pope John Paul II appointed Father Raymond Saeed apostolic administrator for the Diocese.

On 10 January 2000, Pope John Paul II proclaimed Fr. Andrew Francis from the Archdiocese of Lahore as the new bishop.

On 29 October 2001 four gunmen entered St. Dominic's Church, Bahawalpur in the Diocese and shot and killed 15 worshippers and a police guard.

On 29 April 2010 Pope Benedict XVI elevated the Apostolic Prefecture of Quetta to the rank of apostolic vicariate. He appointed Fr. Victor Gnanapragasam as apostolic vicar of the new ecclesiastical circumscription and the titular bishop of Timida. Fr. Victor was parish priest at Khanewal in the Multan Diocese from 1979 to 1985.

On 13 June 2014 Pope Francis accepted the resignation of Bishop Andrew Francis, in accordance with canon 401 para. 2 of the Code of Canon Law, and appointed Rev. Benny Mario Travas, of the clergy of the Archdiocese of Karachi (Karachi, Pakistan) as Apostolic Administrator "Sede Vacante et ad nutum Sanctae Sedis" of the same Diocese.

On 29 May 2015, Pope Francis appointed Travas Bishop of Multan. He received his episcopal consecration on 15 August 2015 from Archbishop Ghaleb Moussa Abdalla Bader, Apostolic Nuncio to Pakistan.

On 11 February 2021, Pope Francis appointed Travas to succeed Joseph Coutts as Archbishop of Karachi.

On 9 December 2022, Pope Francis appointed Fr. Yousaf Sohan as Bishop of Multan. In a 12 December 2022 interview the Bishop-elect outlined his plans to promote education in the diocese. He plans to build more schools and enable homeless children to access education. The Catholic Board of Education, Multan, currently manages 27 schools which provide education to thousands.

== Marian shrine ==
The diocese administers the shrine of Mary, Queen of Thal, built on the pattern of the shrine of Our Lady of Lourdes in 1988.

== Ordinaries ==
- Francesco Benedetto Cialeo, O.P. (15 January 1937 appointed – 13 April 1960 appointed, Bishop of the Diocese of Lyallpur, in Lyallpur, Pakistan)
- Aloysius Louis Scheerer, O.P. (13 April 1960 appointed – 27 January 1966 died)
- Ernest Bertrand Boland, O.P. (17 May 1966 appointed – 20 October 1984 resigned)
- Patras Yusaf (20 October 1984 appointed – 29 December 1998 died)
- Andrew Francis (3 December 1999 appointed – 13 June 2014 resigned)
- Benny Mario Travas (15 August 2015 – 11 February 2021)
- Yousaf Sohan (appointed 9 December 2022)

== Schools ==
St Albans High School, Multan

La Salle Higher Secondary School

St Mary's Higher Secondary School

Sacred Heart Girls High School

Dominican Convent Bahawalpur

Dominican Study Center Bahawalpur

St. Joseph's High School Saeed Colony Multan

St. Joseph's High School Bishop’s House Multan

St. Anthony's High School Louis Colony Multan

St. Peter's Primary School Gulzeb Colony Vehari Road, Multan

St. Joseph's High School Civil Lines, Khanewal

St. Vincent's High School Chak 133/16-L District. Khanewal

St. John Primary School Chak # 120/T.D.A. District. Layyah

Dar-ul-Tarbiat (Ibn-e-Mariam) High School Chak # 270/T.D.A. Loretto, District. Layyah

St. Joseph's High School Chak # 75/B Tehsil Karore District. Layyah

Mission High School Chak # 270/T.D.A. Loretto District. Layyah

Holy Cross High School Church Road, Rahimyar Khan

St. Dominic High School Model Town-A Bahawalpur

St. Joseph's High School, Yousaf Town, Bahawalpur

St. Joseph's Convent High School Chak 133/16-L District. Khanewal

St. Raphael's Primary School Christian Colony, Muzaffargarh

St. Jude's High School Chak # 5/4-L Rungpur District. Muzaffargarh

St. Joseph's Middle School Chak # 11/W.B. Catholic Church Vehari

St. Michael's English Medium High School (Regd) # 571/T.D.A Chowk Munda, Derekabad

St. Mary's Middle School Chak # 587/T.D.A Derekabad

Good Shepherd Convent School, Naqasband Colony Rasheedabad, Multan

Dominican's Primary School, Razabad Colony, Multan

== See also ==
- Catholic Church in Pakistan
