= St. Joseph's Church, Lahore =

St. Joseph's Church
- Location: Sarfaraz Rafiqui Road, Lahore
- Country: Pakistan
- Language(s): Urdu and English
- Denomination: Roman Catholic
- Tradition: Latin

History
- Founded: October 31, 1842
- Events: 88 Christians attacked at the church (2015)

Architecture
- Functional status: Active
- Years built: 1852

Administration
- Archdiocese: Archdiocese of Lahore

Clergy
- Archbishop: Sebastian Francis Shah OFM

St. Joseph's Church, Sarfaraz Rafiqui Road, is the oldest church of the Roman Catholic Archdiocese of Lahore in Pakistan. It was blessed on October 31, 1842. St. Joseph's was originally built to serve Catholics in the British Army. The first wooden chapel was built in 1842 whereas the present church was built in 1852.

The parish of 5,000 families consists of approximately 25,000 Christians.

== Peace Committee ==
A Christian and Muslim Peace Committee helps to keep the peace and harmony among the communities. Special days, festivals and other holidays are celebrated together. The committee arranges medical camps, social, and awareness programmes. This group also helps find jobs for unemployed Christians.

Archbishop Lawrence Saldanha called for the government to create an independent Minorities Commission with judicial powers. At the time no forum allowed minority grievances to be addressed.

== Education ==
Schools in St Joseph's parish currently educate 3,500 in an effort to reduce the estimated 30-40 percent of parish children who receive no schooling.

== Personnel ==
In 2003, the parish priest was Father Nasir Gulfam and Frans Labeeuw (OFM Cap) was his assistant.

After being ordained as the Bishop of Faisalabad on November 1, Bishop Joseph Arshad performed his first mass in St. Joseph's Church on 3 November 2013. He completed his schooling from St Joseph's High School in the Parish. On 12 February 2018 he was installed as the bishop of Rawalpindi - Islamabad diocese. He said my dream for the Church and for all Pakistan is that people can live in peace, harmony and hope. Peace and hope are his episcopal motto.

In 2020 the parish priest was Fr. Qaiser Feroz OFM Cap.

== Violence ==
On 19 October 2015, 88 Christians were attacked at the church, causing deaths. Previously in March, two suicide bombers attacked the church causing fifteen recorded deaths, and dozens of injuries.
