= Bahawalpur church shooting =

Church massacre in 2001

- Bahawalpur (Punjab, Pakistan) Bahawalpur (Pakistan)
- Location: 29°23′23.92″N 71°39′44.3″E; St. Dominic's Church, Bahawalpur, Punjab, Pakistan
- Date: 28 October 2001
- Target: Christians
- Attack type: Mass shooting, mass murder
- Weapon: AK-47s
- Deaths: 18
- Victims: Christians and guard of church
- Assailant: Lashkar-e-Jhangvi
- No. of participants: 6
- Motive: Retaliation to the Afghanistan invasion; religious discrimination

The Bahawalpur church shooting was a mass shooting at Saint Dominic's Church in Bahawalpur, Punjab, Pakistan on 28 October 2001 by six assailants belonging to Lashkar-e-Jhangvi. The guard of the church and 17 other Christians were killed.

== Background ==
Non-Muslims are targeted in Pakistan by extremists. Since Pakistan backed the United States in the 2001 invasion of Afghanistan, terrorists are targeting Pakistani minorities, especially Christians.

== Shooting ==
Six masked gunmen on three motorcycles brought out AK 47 rifles that they were hiding in their bags and started shooting when around 100 people were inside the church. They first killed the guard at the church gate and then entered the church and started shooting the worshippers. While shooting, they were chanting slogans, "Afghanistan and Pakistan, graveyard of Christians" and "Allah hu Akbar" (God is Great). They fired for three minutes, from 08:52 to 08:55 (UTC + 0:500). The assault left 18 people dead.

== Reactions ==
The President of Pakistan, Pervez Musharraf said that he was deeply saddened by the killing, which he blamed on trained terrorists.

Two days after the attack, police launched a crackdown and captured 22 suspects. On 28 July 2002, 4 suspects belonging to Lashkar-e-Jhangvi, who admitted to having committed the crime, were killed in an ambush.

== See also ==
- List of terrorist incidents in Pakistan since 2001
- 2019 Ghotki riots
- 2014 Larkana temple attack
- 2009 Gojra riots
