= Sacred Heart High School for Girls, Lahore =

Sacred Heart High School for Girls
- Lahore, Punjab; Pakistan

Information
- Type: Private primary and secondary school
- Religious affiliation: Catholicism
- Established: 1908; 118 years ago
- Founder: Mother Mary of the Holy Trinity order
- Sister school: Sacred Heart High School for Boys
- Oversight: Catholic Board of Education; Archdiocese of Lahore
- Principal: Sister Rose Yaqoob OP
- Gender: Girls
- Age: 5 to 16

The Sacred Heart High School for Girls is a private Catholic primary and secondary school for girls located in Lahore Pakistan. Established in 1908 by Mother Mary of the Holy Trinity order, the school is one of the oldest girls schools and is administered y the Catholic Archdiocese of Lahore.

== History ==
The school hosted the first L.J. Saldanha Girls' Basketball Tournament held in Lahore in April 2006 to bring together Christian girl athletes. Teams from seven schools took part in the tournament. Farzana Tauqir Zia, a member of Pakistan's first women's basketball team, was the chief guest. Archbishop Lawrence Saldanha handed trophies to the captains and medals to all players of both teams in the finals.

On March 11, 2008, a powerful bomb outside a government building killed at least 30 people and injured about 200 more, damaging Catholic Church buildings in Lahore. The explosion caused serious damage to Sacred Heart Cathedral, Sacred Heart High School for Boys, Sacred Heart High School for Girls, and St. Anthony's College. Three schoolchildren died in the incident. More than 100 children were taken to hospitals for medical treatment.

Dominican Sister Rose Yaqoob is the principal of the school.
