= Youhanabad =

Christian residential town in Lahore, Pakistan

Youhanabad is a residential neighbourhood in Nishtar Town within Lahore, Pakistan. It is the largest majority Christian area in the city of Lahore. It was built by Father Henry, a Belgian Catholic priest in 1950s and is home to at least 100,000 to 200,00 Christians.

Youhanabad was named in 1970 after the name of a boy Youhana son of a well-known Landlord Palous Massih. Palous had owned almost half of the area and the remaining was owned by many Anglo-Indians.

== 2015 Church Bombings ==
Two churches were attacked on 15 March 2015, a Sunday, by suicide bombers. At least 15 people, including two policemen, were killed and 78 injured, 30 of them critically but Akash Bashir sacrificed his life and bravely fought against a suicide bomber, saving 1500 people in a church. Recently, Pope Francis named him a "Servant of God" for the great sacrifice he made in saving innocent human lives from this brutal terrorist attack. The militant Islamist group Jamaat-ul-Ahrar said they were behind the attacks. An enraged Christian mob killed two Muslims, in an instance of street vigilantism, and later it was revealed that the two Muslims were innocent though eyewitnesses claim the individuals were involved in the attack. Later, 40 Christians were arrested and 2 were killed by Punjab police torture. After that, Punjab police started to raid Christian houses to arrest more people, and Youhanabad had almost become a devastated zone.

== See also ==
- Maryam Abad, Gujranwala
