= St. Mary's High School, Peshawar =

Location
- Khyber Road; Peshawar, Khyber Pakhtunkhwa; Pakistan

Information
- Former name: St. Mary's PAF Cambridge School
- Type: Private primary and secondary school
- Religious affiliation: Catholicism
- Denomination: Marist Brothers
- Established: 1957; 69 years ago
- Oversight: Catholic Board of Education
- Principal: Fr.Zeeshan Francisco
- Staff: 85
- Gender: Boys
- Age: 4 to 16
- Enrollment: 1,500
- Language: English
- Houses: Jahangir; Babar; Akbar
- Sports: Athletics, badminton, basketball, cricket, football, badminton gymnastics, hockey, lawn tennis, squash, table tennis, gymnasium
- Affiliations: Board of Intermediate and Secondary Education, Peshawar
- Website: https://stmarypeshawar.edu.pk/

St. Mary's High School is a private Catholic primary and secondary school for boys, located in Peshawar Cantonment, Khyber Pakhtunkhwa, Pakistan. Founded in 1957, the school has been run by the Marist Brothers since 1970.

== Administration ==
The school is run by the Diocesan Board of Education of the Roman Catholic Diocese of Islamabad-Rawalpindi. The Bishop of the diocese is the chairman of the board. The school is administered by the Marist Brothers, who took over the administration in 1970.

== Academics ==
The school conducts classes from Prep to Class 10 (Secondary School Certificate of the Board of Intermediate and Secondary Education, Peshawar). The medium of instruction is English.

== History ==
The school was opened in 1957 in the presbytery of St. Michael's Church on Mall Road, Peshawar Cantonment with fourteen boys who had passed Standard III from Presentation Convent School located next door to St. Michael's Church. Fr. Thyssen was the founder and first principal. The other teachers were Fr. Pingstern and Fr. Heideman. All three were Dutch citizens belonging to the Catholic order of Mill Hill Fathers (London). Before his transfer to Peshawar, Fr. Thyssen was at Burn Hall, Abbottabad and before the Great Partition, he had served in Kashmir.

In 1958, the school moved to Air Force Barracks, on Roberts Road, as St. Mary's PAF Cambridge School. Classes available at the time ranged from Prep to Standard V. Fr.Joseph Beemster from Holland joined the teaching staff around this time

In 1962, the first batch of ten students sat for the Matriculation (SSC) Examination and the success rate was 100%. In the same year, five of its students qualified for GCE 'O' Level of Cambridge University (three in First Division).

The present site of St.Mary's High School was acquired for the school by Fr. Michael Grant, an Irishman and the second principal of the school and the foundation stone laid by Lt. Gen. Altaf Qadir on 29 October 1963. Many parents contributed to the construction of the school by donating a truckload of bricks. In 1970, the Marist Brothers took over the administration of St. Mary's from the Mill Hill Fathers. Br. Patrick Faulkner took over as the first Marist principal.

In 1977, Br. Francis Sales Fernando became the school's tenth principal. During his tenure as principal, many new buildings were added. The fully equipped auditorium, library, squash courts, hall for indoor games, children's park and mini zoo are some of those additions. Technical education was also introduced, with fully equipped workshops, around this time.

In 1993, Br. Charles Fernando took over as the principal. He was replaced by Br. Shanthi Liyanage who led the school until September 2005. During his tenure, a new spacious staff room was added to St. Mary's.

In 2005, students of St. Mary's secured the first position, third position and sixth position in the Board of Intermediate and Secondary Education SSC examination.

=== Golden Jubilee ===
On 29 March 2007, the school celebrated the Golden Jubilee of its foundation. At the time, the principal was Br. Devasiri Fernando FMS. The school had 1,302 students and 70 academic and administrative staff.

== Notable alumni ==
- Bohemia, a Pakistani-American singer-songwriter, rapper, and record producer.
- Noor Alam Khan, Politician

== Past Principals ==
Sr No	Name of Principal	From	To
1	Rev. Father H.P.M. Thyseen (Founder)	April 1957	Jan 1959
2	Rev. Father M. Grant.M.HM.	Jan 1959	Jan 1965
3	Rev. Father J.L Beemster	Jan 1965	May 1966
4	Rev. Father Jac Van Schegen	May 1966	Apr 1970
5	Rev. Brother Patrik Faulkner	Apr 1970	Mar 1972
6	Rev. Brother Bernard Ruiz	Mar 1972	Sept 1972
7	Rev. Brother Rudolf Optiz	Sept 1972	Mar 1973
8	Rev. Father Klaver	Mar 1973	Dec 1973
9	Rev. Brother Cletus H.	Jan 1974	Sept 1977
10	Rev. Brother Fracis Sales Fernando	Sept 1977	Aug 1995
11	Brother Charles H. Fernando	Sept 1995	Jan 1998
12	Brother Shanthi Liyanage	Jan 1998	Aug 2005
13	Brother Charles H. Fernando	Sept 2005	Mar 2010
14	Brother Noel	Mar 2010	Mar 2015
15	Brother Sunil Liyanage	Mar 2015	Feb 2021
16	Asif Nawab Gill	Feb 2021	Aug 2024
17	Rev. Father Zeeshan Francisco O.P.	Aug 2024	Present

== Faculty ==
- M Taha Khan, academic and author

== See also ==
- Christianity in Pakistan
- Education in Pakistan
- List of schools in Pakistan
