= St. Matthew's Church, Nathia Gali =

Church in Nathia Gali

St. Matthew's Church
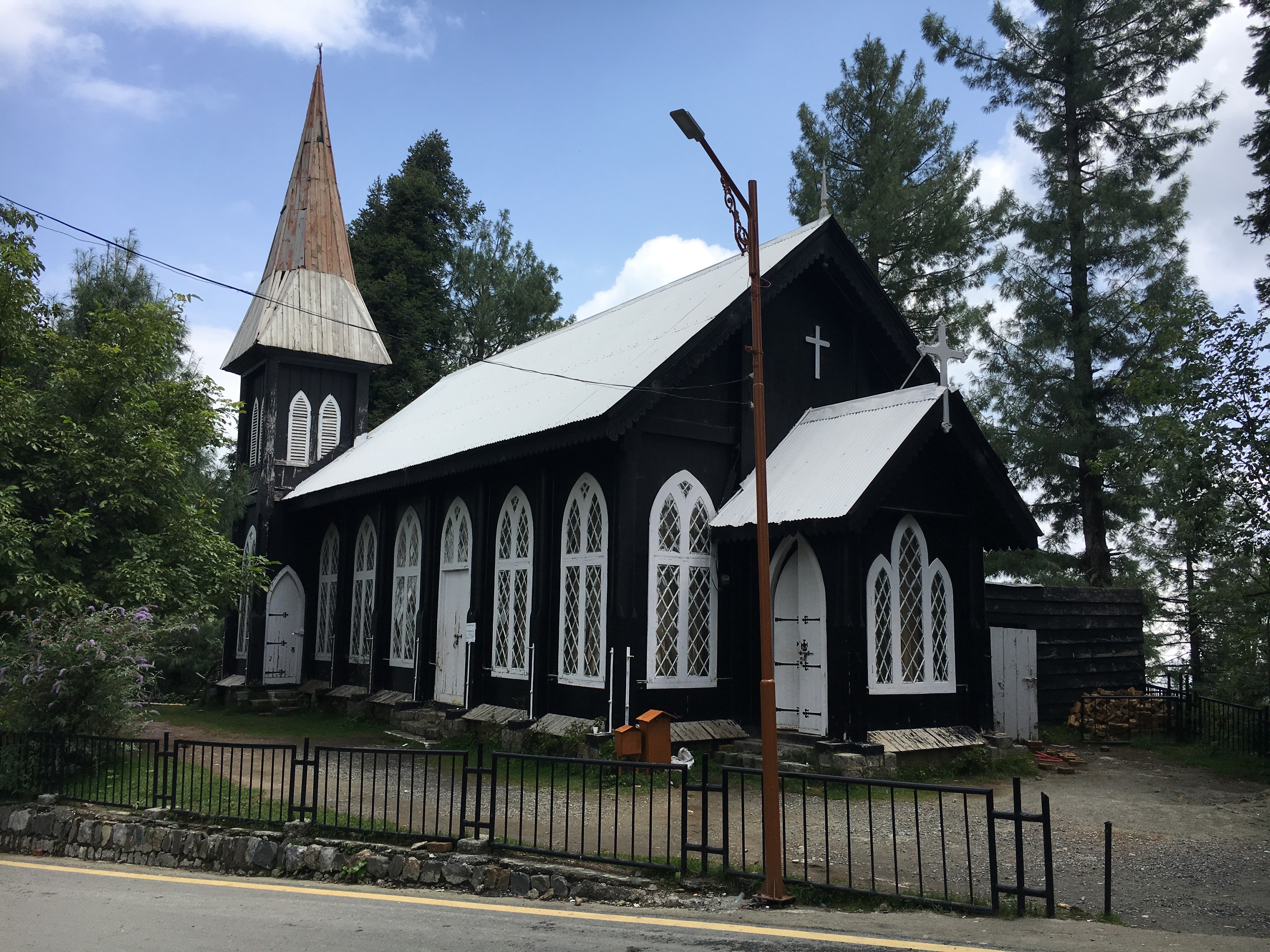
- St. Matthew's Church in 2016
- St. Matthew's Church
- 34°04′17″N 73°23′33″E
- Location: Nathia Gali, Khyber Pakhtunkhwa, Pakistan
- Country: Pakistan

Architecture
- Completed: 1914

St. Matthew's Church is a church located in Nathia Gali, Khyber Pakhtunkhwa, Pakistan. The church is looked after by a Muslim family for three generations.

It has a purpose-built rectory, lodging units, staircase, and an old piano.

== History ==
It was built entirely of cedar wood in 1914 and was designed by Colonel Hope Waddell Kelsall.
