= Terrorist incidents in Pakistan in 2002 =

In 2002, 14 terrorist, insurgent and sectarian-related incidents were reported that killed 60 people and injured 150.

== February ==
- 22 February — The American journalist Daniel Pearl was kidnapped and murdered in Karachi.
- 26 February — At least 11 Shi'a worshipers were killed by indiscriminate firing by a group of masked gunmen at the Shah-i-Najaf Mosque in Rawalpindi.

== March – May ==
- 17 March — A grenade attack on a Protestant church in the heavily guarded diplomatic enclave in Islamabad killed five persons, including a US diplomat's wife and daughter, and left more than 40 others injured.
- 7 May — Noted religious scholar Prof Dr Ghulam Murtaza Malik, his driver and a policeman were shot dead by two gunmen in Iqbal Town, Lahore.
- 8 May — Bus bombing in Karachi kills 11 Frenchmen and 3 Pakistanis near the Sheraton hotel.

== June – August ==
- 14 June — A powerful car bomb exploded near the heavily guarded US Consulate in Karachi, killing 12 people and wounding over 50 others. A portion of the outer wall of the consulate was blown apart.
- 13 July — Nine foreign tourists and three Pakistani nationals were injured in an attack near an archaeological site in the district of Mansehra.
- 5 August — At least six people were killed and four injured in a gun attack on a missionary school for foreign students in mountain resort of Murree. The attack was carried by four gunmen, when they started firing indiscriminately, however no pupils were among those killed, all of whom were Pakistani guards and employees at the school.
- 9 August — Three nurses—and an attacker—were killed while 25 others injured in a terrorist attack on a church in the Taxila Christian Hospital, in Taxila, northern Punjab.

== September – December ==
- 25 September — Gunmen stormed the offices of a Christian welfare organisation in Karachi, tied seven office workers to their chairs before shooting each in the head at close range.
- 16 October — More than eight people were injured in a series of parcel bomb explosions in Pakistan's largest city, Karachi.
- 15 November — An explosion on a bus in Hyderabad, Sindh killed two people and injured at least nine others.
- 5 December — Three people were killed in an attack at the Macedonian Honorary consulate in the city of Karachi. The dead – all Pakistani – were tied up, gagged and killed before the explosion at the office.
- 25 December — Unidentified assailants threw a grenade at a Presbyterian church in Pakistan's central Punjab province, killing three young girls. At least 12 others were injured in the attack at Daska, near Sialkot.
