= Bethania Hospital Sialkot =

- Roman Catholic Archdiocese of Lahore

Geography
- Location: Sialkot, Pakistan
- Coordinates: 32.503700°N 74.510772°E

Organisation
- Care system: Public
- Religious affiliation: Roman Catholic
- Network: National TB Control Programme

Services
- Beds: 215

History
- Opened: 1964

Links
- Website: http://www.bethania-hospital.org/home
- Lists: Hospitals in Pakistan

Bethania Hospital (Urdu: بیت عنیاہ سپتال) is located in Sialkot, Pakistan. It is a medical facility owned by the Roman Catholic Archdiocese of Lahore. The hospital treats 60,000 patients a year, 5,000 of which are TB patients. It has a staff of 130 and occupies an area of 27,870 m^{2} (300,000 sq ft).

Sister Isobel Moran took over the hospital, transforming it into a thriving facility with the addition of extra 50 beds, high standards of affordable care, the introduction of surgical procedures, and obstetric services and improved anaesthetic and intensive care services.

Direct Relief has supported the facility from 2002 to 2005, most recently with a $1.3 million medical assistance shipment in September 2005.

== Tuberculosis program ==
Since its establishment in 1964 by the Belgian Capuchin, Fr. Ligori Janssens (° Wortel, 17.1.1914 - + Antwerpen, 15.1.1987), the hospital has worked extensively to detect and treat TB patients in the region. It is a 215-bed frontline and referral hospital, providing medical and surgical services. There is a specialized TB unit with 100 beds.

In 1991, the Government of Pakistan approved the hospital as a charitable institution. The hospital also receives free medicines for TB treatment under the National TB Control Programme. This enables it to provide free treatment to TB patients.

Ilyas Gill was the manager of the tuberculosis program at Bethania Hospital in 2011.

Every year 350,000 people in Pakistan develop TB. Treatment defaulting is one of the major causes of the failure of TB control programs. A study was carried out in Bethania Hospital from May - July 2006. In the Hospital defaulting rates are as high as 72% for the standard 12 months course. The study revealed the urgent need for a health education campaign to convince the general population that tuberculosis is curable.

TB is a major cause of ill health in Pakistan. Research carried out in Bethania Hospital in 1996-97 was able to contribute to better understanding the problem of low treatment adherence among patients.

A randomised trial of the impact of counselling on treatment adherence of tuberculosis patients in Sialkot was carried out at the hospital in 1999. It included more than 1,000 adult patients of the hospital.

== School of Nursing ==
By 2017 the hospital was also running a School of Nursing.

== School of Health Sciences UMT Sialkot ==
Knowledge Unit of School of Health Sciences Sialkot, University of Management & Technology got affiliation with Bethania Hospital through an MoU in 2021 for clinical training of all health sciences programs including Doctor of Physiotherapy (5 years), BS Nutrition, BS Medical Imaging, Ultrasonography.
