= People's School Program =

Educational public-private partnership in Sindh, Pakistan

People's School Program (PSP) is an educational initiative of the Sindh Education Foundation (SEF) and the government of Sindh, Pakistan. Founded in 2022, it aims to provide quality education through English medium and comprehensive high schools established by the government and operated under public-private partnerships. As of 2025, the People's School Program operates 35 schools across Sindh, with an enrollment of over 25,000 students.
