= Marcel Roger Buyse =

Belgian Catholic bishop

Marcel Roger Buyse (born 22 August 1892 in Izegem) was a Belgian clergyman and prelate for the Roman Catholic Archdiocese of Lahore. He was appointed bishop on 28th October 1947 thus becoming the first Bishop of Lahore in an independent Pakistan. He retired on 10th April 1967 and six years later on 17th November 1973 he left Pakistan and returned to Belgium, on 29th May 1974 he died in Izegem.
