= St Michael's Church, Peshawar =

St Michael's Catholic Church
- Location: The Mall, Peshawar
- Country: Pakistan
- Language(s): Urdu and English
- Denomination: Roman Catholic
- Tradition: Latin

History
- Consecrated: 1851

Architecture
- Functional status: Active
- Style: Built to resemble a Muslim Mosque

Administration
- Metropolis: Lahore
- Diocese: Diocese of Islamabad-Rawalpindi

Clergy
- Bishop: Joseph Arshad

St Michael's Catholic Church is the oldest Catholic Church in Peshawar, Pakistan. It is located on The Mall. It was consecrated in 1851. It is part of the Roman Catholic Diocese of Islamabad-Rawalpindi.

== History ==
In the nineteenth century, armed British Catholic soldiers would parade to church, led by a Drum Major wielding his baton, with two bagpipers and two or four kettle drummers. After Mass, the soldiers would march back to their barracks. The church had special pews with arrangements for holding weapons.

The church was not constructed using traditional Catholic architecture, but was built to resemble a Muslim Mosque, even engraving scriptures in the local language of Pashto.

== Post-Independence ==
Since 1957 the parish has been home to St. Mary's High School for boys.

In 2001, Fr. John William, the parish priest at asked the Pakistani government for soldiers to guard Christian churches and housing developments after threats of violence had been made in Peshawar.

The tower of the church almost collapsed following the country's worst-ever earthquake in 2005.

Church leaders and Christian communities received letters warning them to convert to Islam or face suicide bombings. A group of church leaders met with police officials on August 11, 2007, and urged authorities to protect the minorities and apprehend the fundamentalists for causing unrest. Fr. Yousaf Amanat was parish priest at the time.
