= St Joseph's English High School =

- SJSG
- Satellite Town, Gujranwala, Punjab; Pakistan

Information
- Former name: St Mary's School
- Type: Private primary and secondary school
- Motto: LUX ORIENS
- Religious affiliation: Catholicism
- Established: 1 April 1958; 67 years ago
- Founder: Capuchin Franciscans; Fr. Bene OFM (Cap.)
- School board: BISE
- School district: Gujranwala
- Oversight: Catholic Board of Education; Archdiocese of Lahore
- Language: English; Urdu

St Joseph's English High School is a private Catholic primary and secondary school located in Gujranwala, Punjab, Pakistan. Established in 1958, the school is the first English medium school in Gujranwala.

== History ==
St Joseph's English High School was founded on the 1 April 1954, by Fr. Bene OFM (Cap.) then Parish Priest of Gujranwala, in the Roman Catholic Archdiocese of Lahore. Originally named as St Mary's School, it was started for the Christian students at Khokharki. Mr John Rehmat was the first teacher, with primary classes of about fifteen students.

In 1958 the school was shifted to premises close to Khokharki and the name was changed from St. Mary's to St. Joseph's School by Fr. Clarence OFM (Cap.). Later St Joseph's Urdu Medium Primary School was added. In 1972, all private schools in Pakistan were nationalized by the government.

== Present ==
In 2019, De La Salle Brothers (Brothers of Christian Schools) were given the responsibility to run this Institution from the Arch-Bishop of Lahore.

== Curriculum ==
The school syllabus prepares the pupil from nursery to the matriculation certificate examination of the Gujranwala board. The matriculation classes have only a science stream. All science subjects including mathematics are taught in English while Islamiyat is taught in Urdu. The Urdu medium school has been changed as Girls Campus.
