= St. Mary's Minor Seminary, Lahore =

Catholic seminary in Lahore, Pakistan

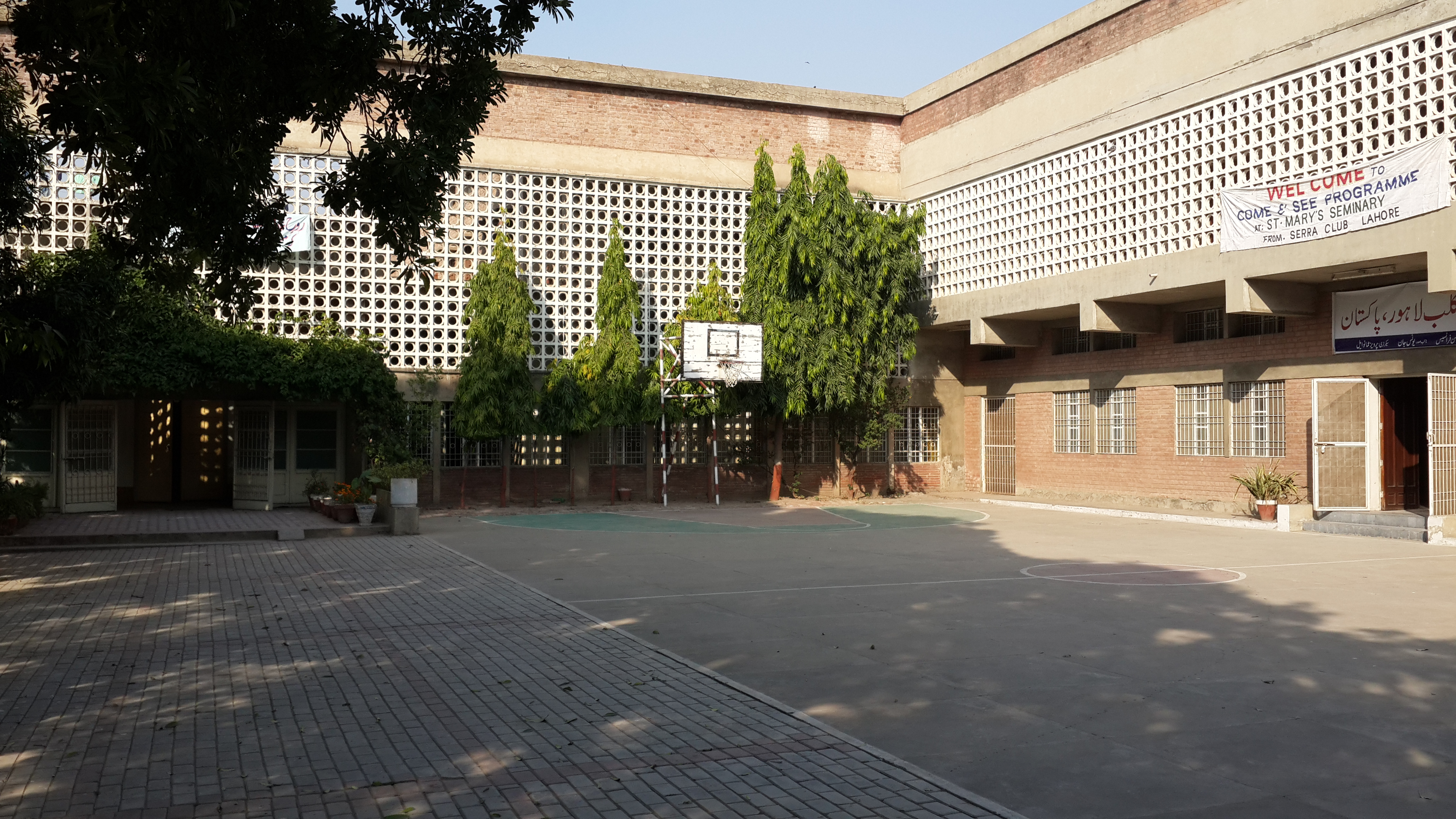
- Motto: Floreat
- Type: Minor Seminary
- Established: 1951
- Founders: Bishop Marcel Roger Buyse OFM(Cap)
- Religious affiliation: Roman Catholic Archdiocese of Lahore
- Rector: Fr. Naqash Azam
- Students: 31
- Location: 30 Mason Road, Lahore, Punjab, Pakistan
- Language: English and Urdu
- Distinguished visitor: Mother Teresa of Calcutta

St. Mary's Minor Seminary, Lahore, is the preparatory seminary in the Roman Catholic Archdiocese of Lahore. It is the first minor seminary in the country, started by Belgian Capuchin Bishop Marcel Roger Buyse of Lahore in 1951. St. Mary's is now serving Lahore, Multan and Rawalpindi dioceses, as well as the Capuchins and Franciscans.

In November 1991 the seminary was visited by Mother Teresa of Calcutta. She spoke to the 112 minor seminarians about their vocation.

From September 1992, St. Mary's Seminary has been training seminarians from two other dioceses – the Karachi archdiocese and Hyderabad diocese. The physical facilities have also been expanded with two new classrooms on the first floor of the seminary and the new extension hall, named after St. John Vianney, patron saint of diocesan clergy. In 1992 the seminary had 98 students.

Bishop Joseph Coutts of Faisalabad has been one of its rectors. Fr. Inayat Bernard was appointed rector of the diocese's St. Mary's Minor Seminary in 1988. Father Zacharia Ghouri was rector of the Seminary in 2007. Bernard is rector of the seminary again in 2016.

Since 1977, the seminary has also been home to the WAVE Studio, that produces audio cassettes and DVDs with performances of Church music.

At St. Mary's Seminary, seminarians are encouraged to take an interest in human development and social issues. The seminarians held a Labor Day program on May 1, 2003, to highlight the importance of laborers.

A Vocation Day was held at the seminary on June 14, 2010. Around 110 Catholic youngsters from several parishes attended the program that included a Mass by Auxiliary Bishop Sebastian Francis Shah of Lahore. In 2010 there are 48 minor seminarians at St. Mary's, along with 48 others studying philosophy at St. Francis Xavier Seminary in Lahore.

The seminary receives financial assistance from the German Catholic agency Kirche in Not.

In 2018, Archbishop Joseph Coutts, a former rector of the Seminary, was created cardinal by Pope Francis.

== Gallery ==
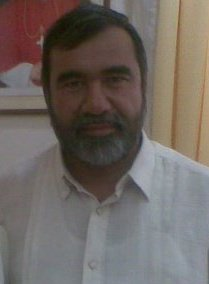
Fr. Inayat Bernard, Rector 1988 - 2007
