= Don Bosco Technical Institute, Lahore =

Don Bosco Technical Institute
- Lahore, Punjab; Pakistan

Information
- Type: Technical Institute
- Religious affiliation: Roman Catholic
- Established: 2000
- Founders: Salesians of Don Bosco
- Administration: Catholic Board of Education
- Rector / Vice Rector: Fr. Eugenio Maglasang / Fr. Noble Lal
- Gender: boys
- Age: 15 to 22
- Enrollment: 150
- Affiliation: Roman Catholic Archdiocese of Lahore

The Don Bosco Technical Institute for Boys in Lahore, Pakistan, is a trade school, educating mainly Christian but some Muslim youths, ranging in age from 15 to 22.

The center, run by the Salesians of Don Bosco, opened in 2000 with 10 Catholic boarding students.

Spread over an area the equivalent of three football fields, the center offers technical skills to youths, most of whom dropped out of school. Salesian Father Miguel Angel Ruiz, the center's first principal, took charge in 2002.

The center has expanded from one to four technical trades: automotive, electrical, metalwork, and air conditioning and refrigeration. Students in its two-year program learn skills in each of these trades.

The Institute produces skilled manpower to respond to Pakistan's annual need for 1 million skilled workers in local industries. It is registered with the Technical Education and Vocational Training Authority (TEVTA) in 2005. TEVTA is the nation's biggest network of polytechnic and vocational-training institutions.

In 2007, the Institute passed government school inspection for approval as a technical institute. The government inspectors' report approved renewal of registration in the Register of Technical Education in the Punjab. The Salesian community welcomed the results which followed years of effort to obtain official recognition from the Government.

In July 2011 the Chairman of the Technical Education and Vocational Training Authority (TEVTA) visited the Institute. He is impressed by the cutting edge laboratories of the institute he proposed a plan of cooperation between the Center and the Government to replicate the advances in other institutes in the country.

In 2012 the principal Father Miguel Angel Ruiz was awarded the Medal of the Royal Order of Isabella the Catholic by the King of Spain.

In 2013 it has been described as a “top technical trades school” by the Union of Catholic Asian News, the leading independent Catholic news source in Asia.

In a video report, the principal Father Ruiz described the institute as “ a beacon of hope” for young boys in Pakistan. 80% of the students live in the hostel where room, board and educational materials are supplied for a fee of Rs. 700 (US$7) per month.

The institute was temporarily closed on March 15, 2015, when a suicide bomber killed 17 and wounded 78, including two Salesian students, outside Christian churches in Lahore.
