= Fabien Antoine Eestermans =

Belgian clergyman and Roman Catholic prelate

Fabian Antoine Eestermans (born 24 April 1858 in Meerle) was a Belgian clergyman and prelate for the Roman Catholic Archdiocese of Lahore. He was appointed bishop in 1905 and that year made a visit to Khushpur village where he seemed to be happy about development there.

In 1907 he consecrated the Sacred Heart church in Lahore that had been commissioned by his predecessor Eestermans resigned in 1925 at the age of 67 to become Titular Bishop of Letopolis, and died on 29th January 1931 at Louvain in the university clinic, and posthumously became Bishop Emeritus of Lahore.
