= Andrew Francis (bishop) =

Pakistani bishop (1946–2017)

His Grace, The Most Reverend Andrew Francis
- Bishop
- Church: Roman Catholic
- See: Roman Catholic Diocese of Multan
- In office: 2000 – 2014
- Predecessor: Ernest Bertrand Boland, O.P.
- Successor: Benny Mario Travas
- Previous post: Parish Priest

Orders
- Ordination: 10 January 1972
- Consecration: 26 February 2000 by Archbishop Alessandro D'Errico; Bishop Anthony Theodore Lobo

Personal details
- Born: 29 November 1946 Adah, Pakistan
- Died: 6 June 2017 (aged 70)

Andrew Francis (29 November 1946 – 6 June 2017) was the Pakistani Catholic prelate who served as the Bishop of Multan from 2000 to 2014.

== Biography ==
He was born in Adah, Pakistan on 29 November 1946. He was educated at St. Mary’s Convent school, Adah and St Francis High School, Lahore.

He received his religious training at the Christ the King Seminary in Karachi. On 10 January 1972, he was ordained a priest of the Archdiocese of Lahore. He has been rector of Sacred Heart Cathedral, Lahore in 1986 and later Parish Priest of St. Anthony's Church, Lahore, until his ordination as bishop in February 2000.

Francis also served as the editor-in-chief of Pakistan's oldest catholic fortnightly the Catholic Naqib.

On 3 December 1999 he was appointed Bishop of Multan in Pakistan. He was ordained as bishop on 26 February 2000.

It was later revealed that a civil court had issued a stay order on the ordination of the Bishop-elect, but he was ordained before the court order arrived. Archbishop Alessandro D'Errico, apostolic nuncio to Pakistan, and Bishop Anthony Lobo of Islamabad-Rawalpindi presided at the ordination of Bishop Francis at a private chapel of the Lahore archbishop's house.

Bishop Francis was the chairman of the National Commission for Inter-religious Dialogue and Ecumenism, National Commission of Sacred Liturgy and National Commission of Catholic Urdu Literature. Also he was a member of Pontifical Council for Inter-religious Dialogue - Rome, International Commission for English in the Liturgy, USA and the Minority Committee of the Government of Pakistan.

In 2014 Francis was injured in a car accident and became a wheelchair user.

On 13 June 2014 Pope Francis accepted the resignation of Bishop Andrew Francis in accordance with canon 401 para. 2 of the Code of Canon Law, and appointed Benny Travas of Karachi as Apostolic Administrator.

Bishop Andrew died on 6 June 2017, aged 70.
