= Sebastian Francis Shaw =

Pakistani Roman Catholic archbishop (born 1957)

The Most Reverend Sebastian Francis Shaw OFM
- Vicar Apostolic of Quetta
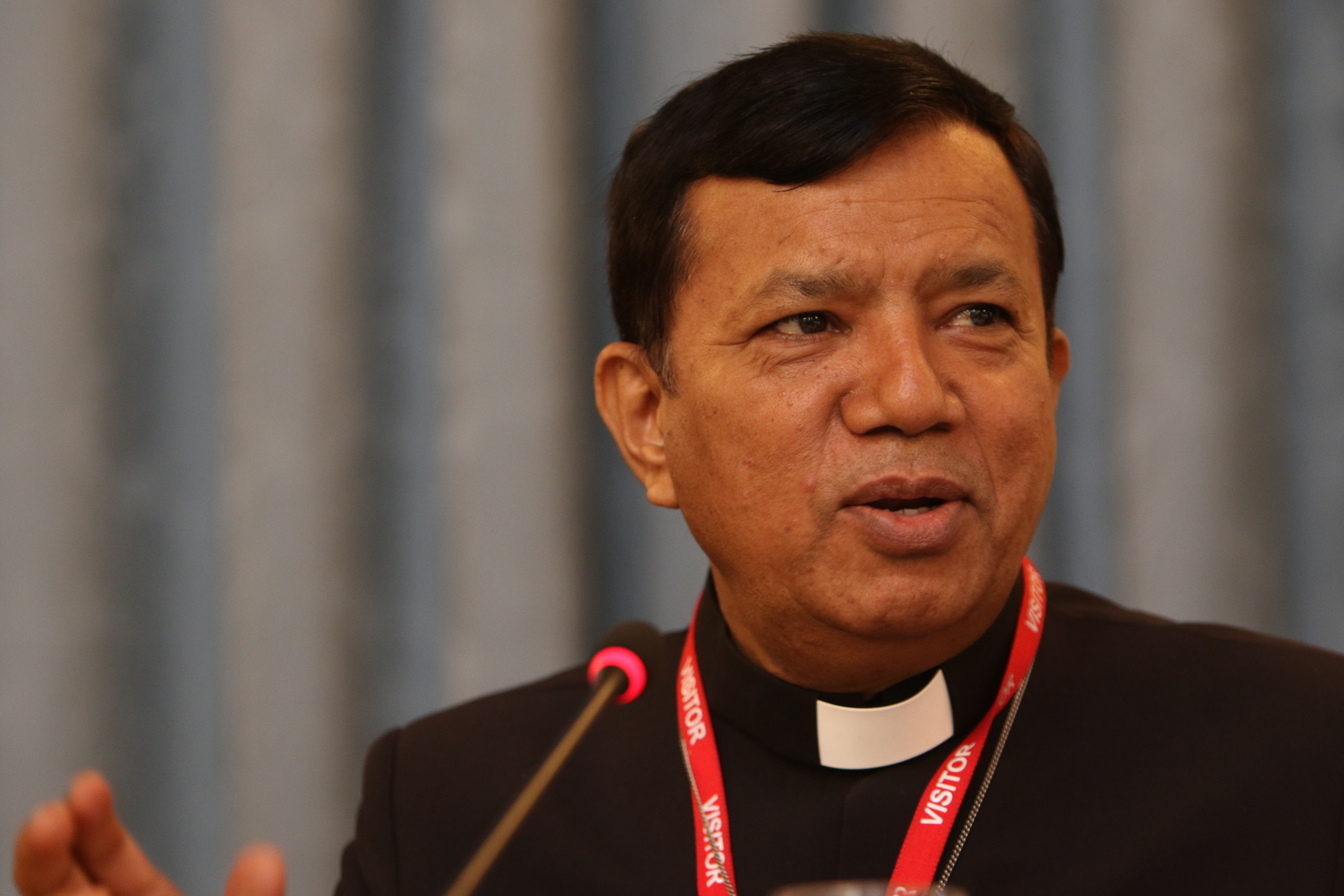
- Church: Roman Catholic Church
- Archdiocese: Karachi
- Appointed: 11 March 2026
- Predecessor: Khalid Rehmat
- Previous post: Archbishop of Lahore

Orders
- Ordination: 6 December 1991
- Consecration: 25 April 2009 by Lawrence Saldanha
- Rank: Archbishop

Personal details
- Born: 14 November 1957 (age 68) Padri-Jo-Goth, Pakistan
- Motto: Love, Service, Peace

Sebastian Francis Shaw (born 14 November 1957) is a Pakistani Roman Catholic bishop.

== Biography ==
He was born in Padri Jo Goth, Sindh, Pakistan on 14 November 1957. He received his early education at Fatima High School and attended the Government Degree College. He received his religious training under the Order of Friars Minor and at the Christ the King seminary in Karachi and was ordained a priest in Lahore, Pakistan on 6 December 1991. Before joining the Franciscans he was a teacher.

He was rector of the Juniorate and Postulancy of Dar ul Naim Seminary in Lahore from 1991 until 1995, taught at St. Mary's Minor Seminary, Lahore, and has also been Provincial of the Order of Friars Minor in Pakistan.

On 14 February 2009 he was appointed Auxiliary Bishop of Lahore by Pope Benedict XVI. Shaw holds a Master of Science degree in Guidance and Counselling from De La Salle University in Manila.

Shaw was consecrated as bishop at Sacred Heart Cathedral, Lahore, on 25 April 2009. The principal celebrant was the Archbishop of Lahore Lawrence Saldanha, who was assisted by Max John Rodrigues, Bishop of Hyderabad and Joseph Coutts, Bishop of Faisalabad.

On 27 October 2013 Pope Francis appointed Shaw as a member of the Pontifical Council for Interreligious Dialogue.

On 14 November 2013, Pope Francis appointed Bishop Shaw as Archbishop of Lahore. Shaw presided over the funeral of Akash Bashir, the second Servant of God from Pakistan.

In 2024, allegations of sexual abuse and financial fraud against him were made public.

On March 10, 2026, Pope Leo XIV appointed him the Vicar Apostolic of Quetta.

== See also ==
- Portiuncula Friary
