= Lawrence Saldanha =

Indian-born Pakistani archbishop

His Grace Lawrence John Saldanha
- Archbishop Emeritus of Roman Catholic Archdiocese of Lahore
- Church: Roman Catholic
- See: Roman Catholic Archdiocese of Lahore
- In office: 2001–2011
- Predecessor: Armando Trindade †
- Successor: Sebastian Francis Shaw OFM
- Previous post: Priest

Orders
- Ordination: 16 January 1960
- Consecration: 11 September 2001 by Archbishop Simeon Anthony Pereira †; Bishop Anthony Lobo †; Bishop Andrew Francis

Personal details
- Born: 12 June 1936 (age 90) Mangalore, India
- Education: Christ the King Seminary, Karachi
- Motto: Heralds of Hope

Lawrence John Saldanha (born 12 June 1936) is an Indian-born retired Pakistani archbishop. Born in Mangalore, India, he received his religious training at the Christ the King seminary in Karachi and was ordained a priest in Lahore, Pakistan on 16 January 1960.

== Biography ==
Saldanha earned a doctorate in systematic theology from Rome-based Pontifical Urbaniana University. He participated in the Second Vatican Council.

He served in different parishes in Lahore. He served from 1971 to 1974 as editor of the Catholic Naqib, the Archdiocese's Urdu bimonthly. He was also rector of Christ the King Seminary in Karachi from 1974 to 1979 and taught dogmatic theology there until 1983.

From 1986 to 1998, he was head of the social communications commission and WAVE Studio, the Church's national audiovisual center in Lahore. He also headed the UCA News bureau in Pakistan.

He was serving as associate pastor of Precious Blood Church in Toronto, Canada, when he was recalled to serve the Church in Pakistan. On 24 April 2001 he was appointed Archbishop of Lahore by Pope John Paul II. He took as his motto Heralds of Hope.

On 16 January 2010, Archbishop Saldanha celebrated his Golden Jubilee as a priest, of serving his church for 50 years.

On 7 April 2011 Archbishop Saldanha retired as Archbishop of Lahore.

Saldanha also served as the first executive secretary of Caritas Pakistan from 1966 to 1973, chairman of Radio Veritas Asia, and president of the Federation of Asian Bishops' Conferences.

He returned to Canada after his retirement in 2011 and is helping persecuted Pakistani Christians in Canada.

In 2016 Saldanha became a Canadian citizen.

On 16 January 2020, he celebrated his 60th anniversary of his priestly ordination at Precious Blood Parish in Toronto, Canada.
