= Archdiocese of Lahore =

Latin Catholic archdiocese in Pakistan

Coordinates: 31°32′N 74°20′E

Metropolitan Archdiocese of Lahore Archidioecesis Metropolitae Lahorensis اسقف اعظم شهری لاہور
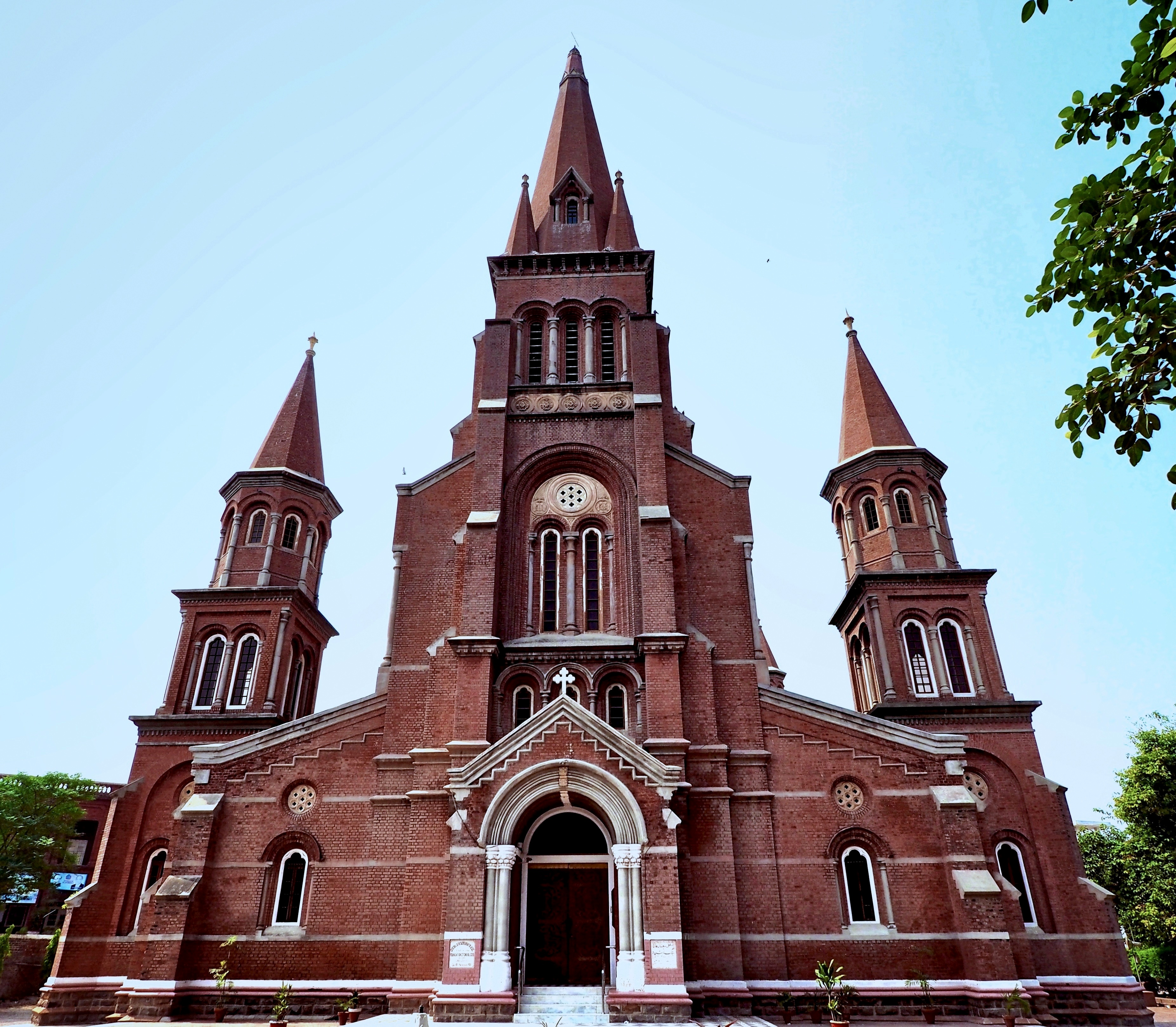
- Sacred Heart Cathedral in Lahore

Location
- Country: Pakistan
- Ecclesiastical province: Lahore

Statistics
- Area: 23,069 km^{2} (8,907 sq mi)
- Population: Total; Catholics: (as of 2004); 25,000,000; 570,000 (2.3%)

Information
- Denomination: Catholic Church
- Sui iuris church: Latin Church
- Rite: Roman Rite
- Cathedral: Sacred Heart Cathedral, Lahore

Current leadership
- Pope: Leo XIV
- Metropolitan Archbishop: Benny Mario Travas
- Bishops emeritus: Lawrence John Saldanha

Website
- www.archdiocese-lahore.com

The Metropolitan Archdiocese of Lahore is a Latin Metropolitan Archdiocese in Punjab province, Pakistan.

Its episcopal seat is the Sacred Heart Cathedral in Lahore.

== History ==
In 1594 the Mughal emperor Akbar invited some Catholic priests from Goa to take up permanent residence at his court. This group of missionaries, all Jesuits, once they arrived in the Punjab, were able to build a church, where they celebrated Christian rites, and began to receive adults into the Church.

A quasi diocese, which later became the Archdiocese of Lahore, was established by the Holy See in 1880 as the Vicariate Apostolic of the Punjab, on territory taken from the Apostolic Vicariate of Agra (which itself later also became a Metropolitan Archdiocese).

On 1 September 1886 this Vicariate Apostolic of the Punjab was given enhanced status and renamed, becoming the Diocese of Lahore.

In various stages, as other missionary circumscriptions were founded in the area, successful ceded parts of the original territory:

- on 6 July 1887 to establish the Apostolic Prefecture of Kafiristan and Kashmir
- on 13 September 1910 to establish the Metropolitan Archdiocese of Simla (now a suffragan diocese of the Metropolitan Archdiocese of Delhi)
- on 17 December 1936 to establish the Apostolic Prefecture of Multan (now its suffragan diocese)
- on 17 January 1952 to establish the Apostolic Prefecture of Jalandhar and the Apostolic Prefecture of Kashmir and Jammu.

On 15 November 1888, the Congregation for the Propagation of the Faith entrusted responsibility for the Diocese of Lahore to the Order of Friars Minor Capuchin.

On 23 April 1994 the diocese was elevated to the rank of Metropolitan Archdiocese. Fr. Lawrence Saldanha was appointed Archbishop of Lahore by Pope John Paul II.

On 14 February 2009, Fr Sebastian Francis Shaw, of the Friars Minor was appointed Auxiliary Bishop of the Archdiocese of Lahore by Pope Benedict XVI.

On 7 April 2011 Archbishop Saldanha retired as Archbishop of Lahore.

On 18 December 2011, the archdiocese began celebrations to mark its 125th anniversary. Seventy-five priests and 200 catechists served then in 608 Mass centres in the archdiocese.

Pope Francis on 3 July 2013 appointed Fr. Joseph Arshad, a priest of the Lahore Archdiocese Bishop of Faisalabad.

On 14 November 2013 the Auxiliary, Bishop Shaw, was appointed to succeed Archbishop Saldanha as Archbishop of Lahore.

== Bishops ==
=== Vicar Apostolic of the Punjab ===
- Paul Tosi, OFM Cap. (1 September 1886 – 10 August 1888)

=== Bishops of Lahore ===
1. Symphorien Mouard, OFM Cap. (10 August 1888 – 14 July 1890)
2. Emmanuel van den Bosch, OFM Cap. (21 November 1890 – 2 May 1892)
3. Godefroid Pelckmans, OFM Cap. (2 June 1928 – 4 July 1946)
4. Fabian Antoine Eestermans, OFM Cap. (11 April 1905 – 17 December 1925)
5. Hector Catry, OFM Cap. (28 March 1928 – 4 July 1946)
6. Marcel Roger Buyse, OFM Cap. (23 March 1967 – 10 July 1975)
7. Felicissimus Raeymaeckers, OFM Cap. (12 March 1967 – 10 July 1975)
8. Armando Trindade (10 July 1975 – 23 March 1994)

=== Metropolitan Archbishops of Lahore ===
1. Armando Trindade (23 March 1994 – 31 July 2000)
2. Lawrence Saldanha (24 April 2001 – 7 April 2011)
3. Sebastian Francis Shaw, OFM (14 November 2013 – 15 August 2024)
4. Benny Mario Travas (15 August 2024 - 28 March 2026 as a Administrator of the Metropolitan Archdiocese of Lahore)
5. Khalid Rehmat (28 March 2026 -)

== Province ==
Its ecclesiastical province comprises the Metropolitan's own archdiocese and the following suffragan bishoprics:

- Diocese of Faisalabad
- Diocese of Islamabad–Rawalpindi
- Diocese of Multan

== Extent ==
The Sacred Heart Cathedral is the principal church of the archdiocese. The archdiocese is also home to St. Joseph’s Church, Lahore, the oldest church of the Punjab, built in 1853.

The archdiocese also publishes the Catholic Naqib, the oldest Urdu-language Catholic journal, founded in Lahore in 1929.

In 1964 the diocese opened the 215 bed Bethania Hospital, Sialkot which focuses mainly on preventing and treating TB. In 2008 it was treating 60,000 patients a year.

Lahore archdiocese had 511,226 Catholics, 30 diocesan priests, and 214 nuns, according to the 2001 Annuario Pontificio, the Vatican yearbook. The largest Catholic archdiocese in Pakistan is divided into 26 parishes.

The archdiocese is also home to the St. Francis Xavier Seminary.

The country’s 1st National Eucharistic Congress was organised by the local Catholic Church 9–11 September 2005 at the Marian Shrine of Mariamabad, Lahore diocese. It drew 20,000 participants and attracted ample media coverage local and national. The national Marian shrine of Mariamabad is situated 90 km from Lahore. Every year it draws thousands of clergy, religious and laity, families, other Christians and Muslims. Mariamabad shrine was opened in 1949 by a Belgian Capuchin Friar Frank who died a martyr.

On 14 February 2009 Fr. Sebastian Francis Shah OFM was appointed Auxiliary Bishop of Lahore.

The diocese is also home to Catholic TV, Pakistan the first Pakistani Catholic TV channel launched in 2009.

In 2019, the Archdiocese had 29 parishes, 32 diocesan seminarians and 27 religious communities.

== Schools in the Diocese ==
There were 57,744 students in Catholic schools in the archdiocese - 33 primary schools and 59 high schools. Some of the schools are:

- St. Anthony's High School, Cantonment, Lahore
- St. Joseph's English High School, Gujranwala
- Convent of Jesus and Mary, Sialkot
- Presentation Convent School, Jhelum
- Convent of Jesus and Mary (Ambala Cantt)
- Sacred Heart High School for Boys
- Sacred Heart High School for Girls
- St. Anthony's Girls School, Sangla Hill
- St. Anthony's High School (Lahore), Lawrence Road
- St. Joseph's English High School
- St. Thomas' High School, Jhelum
- Don Bosco Technical Institute, Lahore
- St. Paul's High School, Gujranwala
- Don Bosco High School
- St. Anthony's High School, Faisal Town, Lahore
- St. Thomas' School, Gulberg
- St. Mary's High School, Lahore.
- Franciscan Girls High School, Lahore
- St. Lawrence High School, Gulberg, Lahore
- St. Mary's High School, Gujranwala
- St Francis High School, Lahore

== See also ==
- Christianity in Pakistan
- Catholic Church in Pakistan
- Catholics in Pakistan Official Website approved by the Catholic Church of Pakistan

== Source and External links ==
- Official website of the diocese (in English)
- GigaCatholic, with incumbent biography links
