= Sacred Heart Cathedral, Lahore =

Sacred Heart Cathedral
- سیکرڈ ہارٹ گرجا
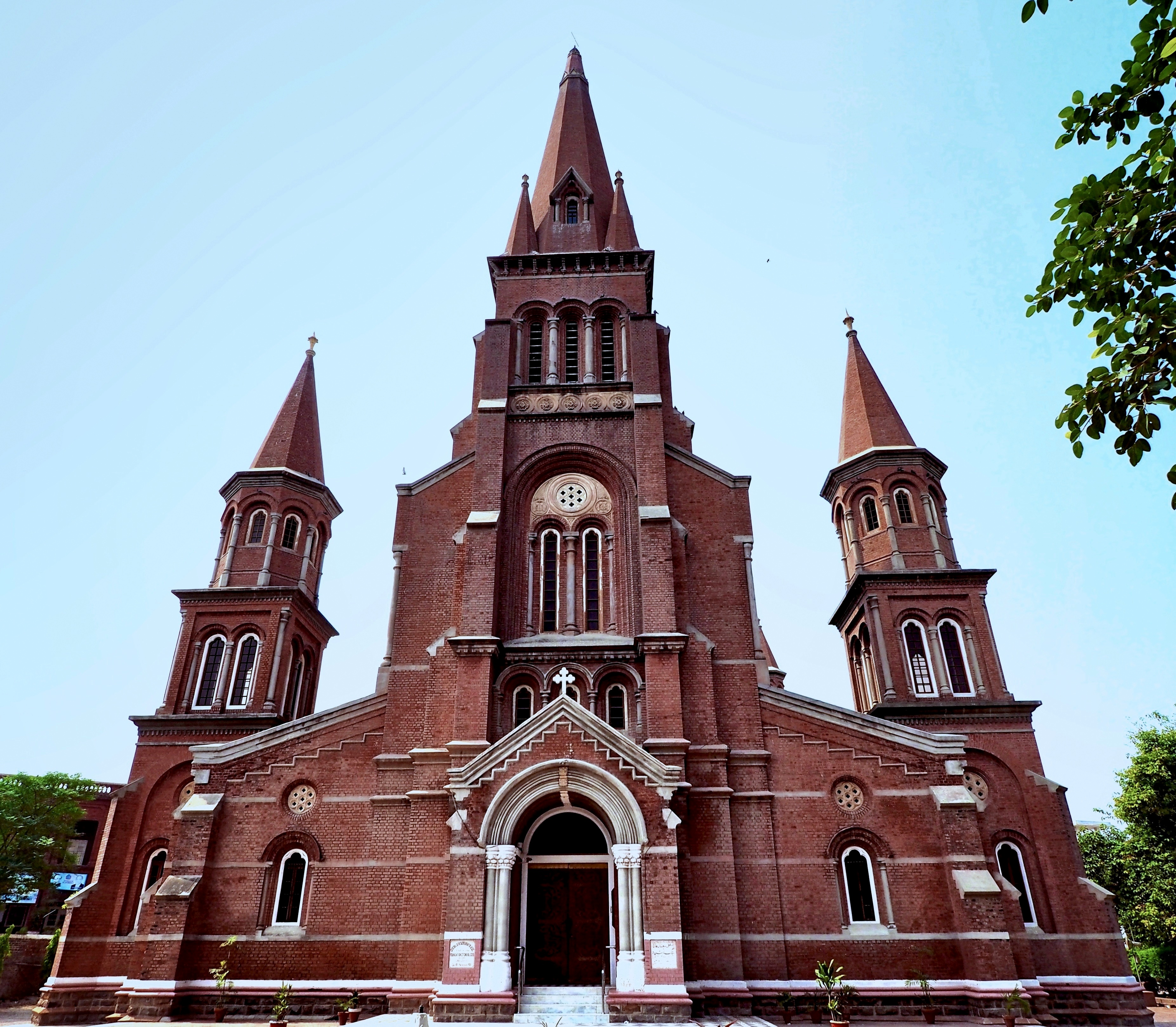
- Sacred Heart Cathedral
- Sacred Heart Cathedral
- 31°33′55″N 74°19′02″E
- Location: The Mall, Lawrence Road, Lahore, Punjab
- Country: Pakistan
- Denomination: Roman Catholic

History
- Consecrated: 19 November 1907

Architecture
- Functional status: Cathedral
- Architect: Edouard Dobbeleers
- Architectural type: Cathedral
- Style: Roman Byzantine

Administration
- Archdiocese: Lahore

Clergy
- Archbishop: Sebastian Francis Shaw

Sacred Heart Cathedral (Urdu: سیکرڈ ہارٹ گرجا) is the seat of the Roman Catholic Archdiocese of Lahore, located in Lahore, Punjab, Pakistan. Built at the behest of bishop Godefroid Pelckmans (Bishop of Lahore, 1893-1904) with Belgian aid and materials, the cathedral was consecrated by Bishop Fabian Eestermans, the Bishop of Lahore, on 19 November 1907. Its roots lie in the historical presence of the Belgian Capuchins in Pakistan. The design of this Cathedral was made according to the Roman Byzantine-style by Belgian architect, Edouard Dobbeleers of Antwerp.

== History ==
A special commemorative postage stamp was released on the Centenary Day of the Cathedral by the Government of Pakistan. Benedict XVI also sent a message for the jubilee of the Lahore cathedral. Archbishop Adolfo Tito Yllana, Apostolic Nuncio to Pakistan, read out the special message from the Pope to the local congregation in Lahore.

In 2007, Father Andrew Nisari was the Rector of the Cathedral.

On 11 March 2008 a suicide bomber drove a vehicle loaded with explosive material into the eight-storey FIA office situated at Temple Road, Lahore. At least ten of the cathedral's stained-glass windows were hit by the blast. Many of the other window panes were also blown out. In the meantime they have been restored in Belgium.

In 2011, the Cathedral had registered more than 20,000 baptisms and nearly 5,500 marriages since its founding.

The cathedral was awarded the Belgian Heritage Abroad prize in 2015.

In 2020, the Punjab Minister for Minority Affairs, Ijaz Alam Augustine asked the provincial government to put the cathedral on the national heritage list. He has also said that his ministry will cover the expenses of restoration work needed, including new pipes, electrical system and other beautification work, approximately 50,000,000 rupees (about US$300,000).

In 2021, the rector was Father Mushtaq Pyara.

In 2022, the Walled City of Lahore Authority announced that it would spend Rs 15 million on the preservation and conservation of the cathedral.

== Gallery ==
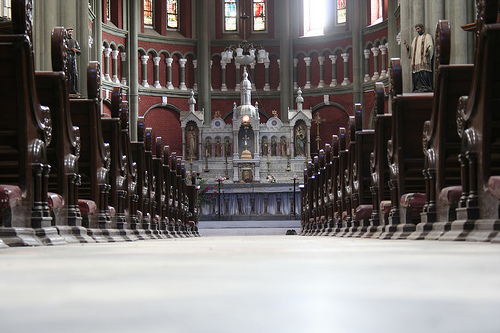
Altar

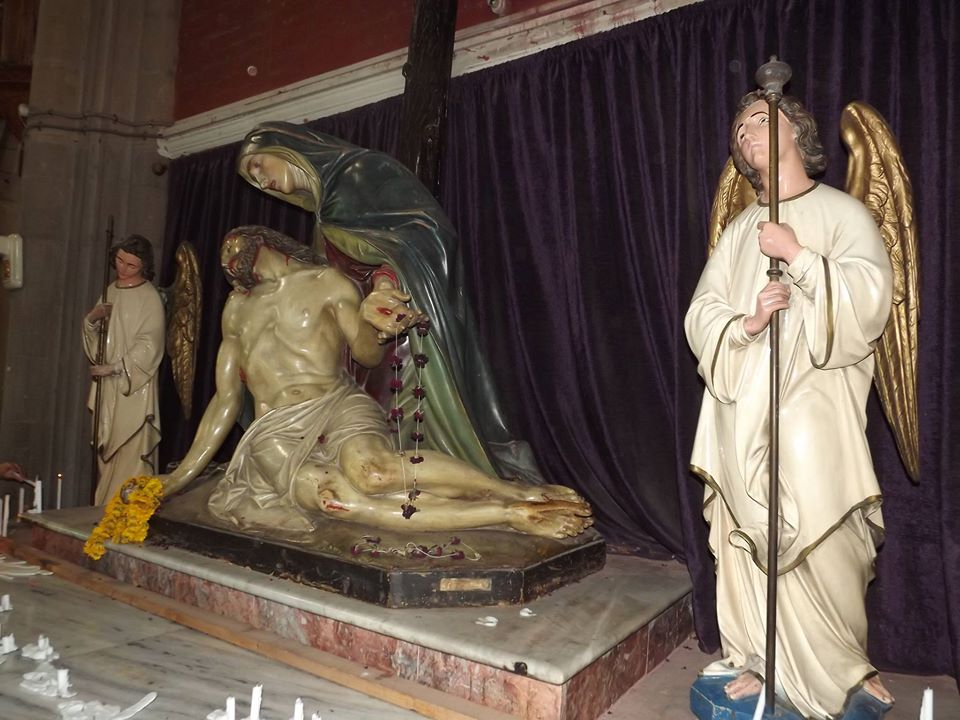
Sacred Heart Cathedral (inside view)

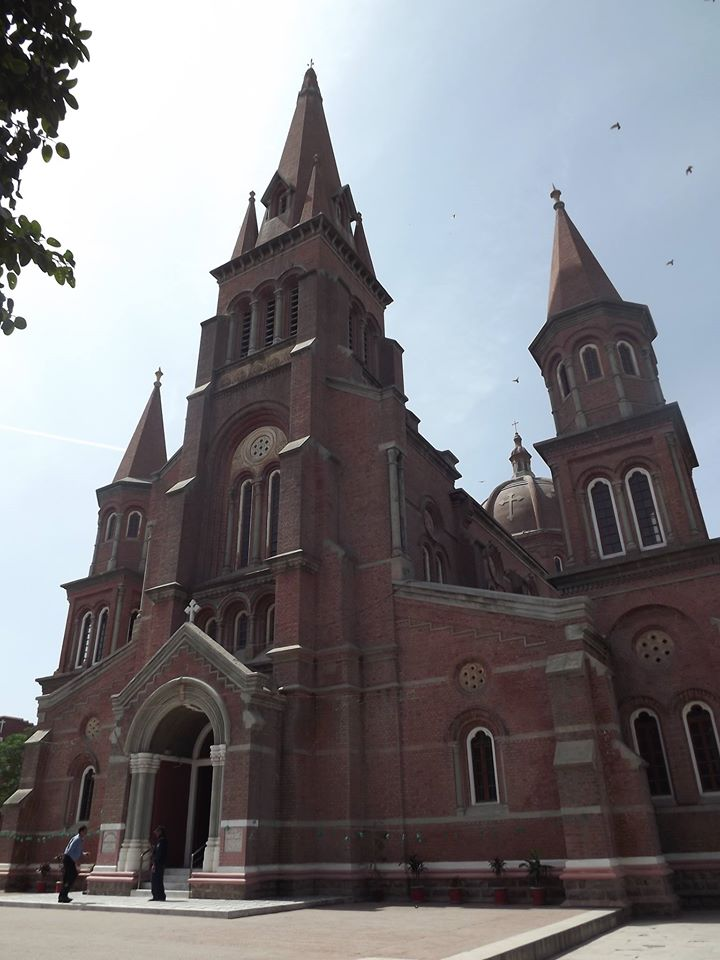
Sacred Heart Cathedral (exterior)

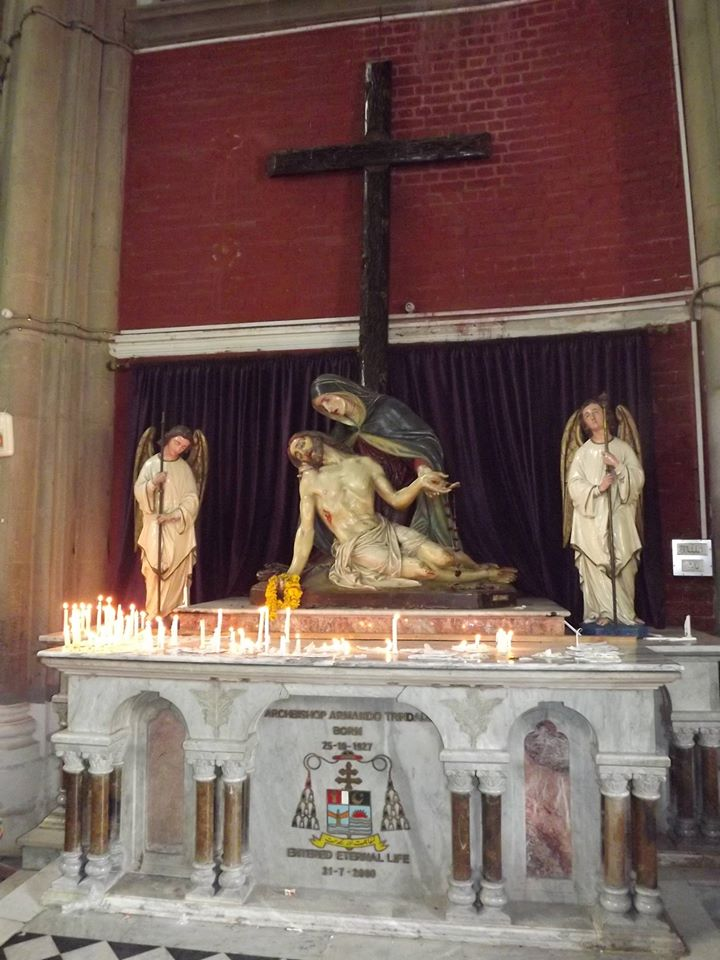
Sacred Heart Cathedral (altar)

== See also ==
- Roman Catholicism in Pakistan
- Sacred Heart Convent School, Lahore
- Cathedral of the Resurrection, Lahore (Anglican)
