= Convent of Jesus and Mary =

Network of Roman Catholic schools

The Convent of Jesus and Mary ("CJM") is a network of Roman Catholic schools founded by the Congregation of the Religious of Jesus and Mary. The school network originating in east-central France in the 19th century has since its inception expanded to several countries in Europe, Asia, Africa, North and South America.

== Countries ==
There are schools in Ireland, Spain, Italy, England, and Germany, the United States, Canada, Mexico, Colombia, and Bolivia, Lebanon, Syria, Cameroon, Equatorial Guinea, Gabon, India, Pakistan, and the Philippines.

== History ==
Claudine Thévenet (1774–1837) (known as Mary of St. Ignatius) founded the religious institute of the Religious of Jesus and Mary, a Roman Catholic religious congregation of women dedicated to the education and service of the poor in Lyon, France, on 5 October 1818.

== School Network ==
Some of the CJM schools include:

India:

- St. Patrick’s Junior College, Convent of Jesus and Mary, Agra (1842)
- St. Anthony's Junior College, Agra (1945)
- Convent of Jesus and Mary, Ambala (1909)
- Convent of Jesus and Mary, Dehradun (1901)
- Convent of Jesus and Mary, Delhi (1919)
- Mount Mary Convent High School (1913)
- Convent of Jesus and Mary, Mumbai; Fort Convent, Mumbai (1855)
- St. Anne’s High School, Fort, Mumbai (1929)
- Convent of Jesus and Mary, Mussoorie (1845)
- St. Anne’s School, Camp, Pune (1860)
- Convent of Jesus and Mary, Ranaghat (1996)
- Convent of Jesus and Mary, Chelsea, Shimla (1864)
- Convent of Jesus and Mary School, Vadodara (1946)

Colleges:

- Jesus and Mary College, New Delhi (1968)
- St. Bede's College, Shimla (1904)

Ireland:

- Convent of Jesus and Mary, Gortnor Abbey, Co. Mayo (1912)

Pakistan:

- Convent of Jesus and Mary, Sialkot (1856)
- Convent of Jesus and Mary, Murree (1876)
- Convent of Jesus and Mary, Lahore (1876)
- Convent of Jesus and Mary, Karachi (1957)

United Kingdom:

- Convent of Jesus and Mary, Thornton College, Thornton, Buckingham
- Convent of Jesus and Mary Language College, London
