= Convent of Jesus and Mary, Lahore =

Private school in Lahore, Pakistan

Coordinates: 31.5613°N 74.3393°E

Convent of Jesus and Mary
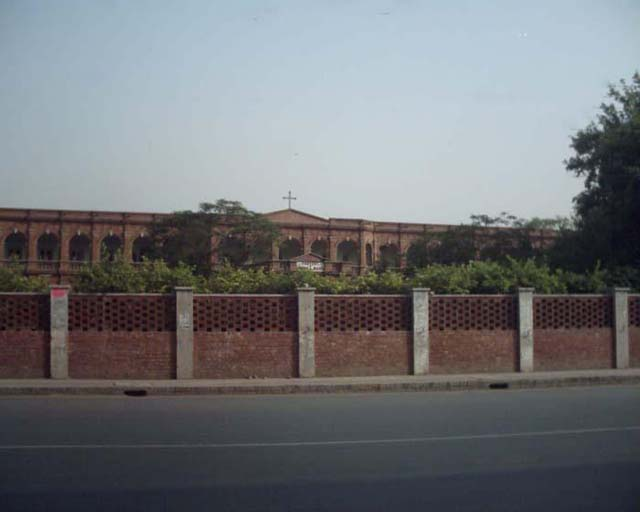
- Durand Road, Lahore, Punjab; 54000; Pakistan

Information
- Type: Private primary and secondary school
- Motto: "Education is not Information but Formation"
- Religious affiliation: Catholicism
- Established: November 17, 1876
- Founders: Claudine Thevenet; Religious of Jesus and Mary
- Principal: Sister Pilar Vila San Juan Sagnier RJM
- Gender: Girls
- Age: 3 to 18
- Enrollment: ~2300
- Houses: 4
- Colours: Red and white
- Nickname: Convent

The Convent of Jesus and Mary, Lahore, commonly referred to as Convent, is a private Catholic primary and secondary school for girls situated in Lahore, Punjab, Pakistan. It was founded on 17 November 1876 by Religious of Jesus and Mary, a congregation founded by Saint Claudine Thevenet, that received official recognition in 1881. It educates over 2,300 girls aged between 4 and 18 years starting from preschool to Grade 11.

== History ==
The Sisters of Jesus & Mary first went from Lyon (France) to the Indian subcontinent in 1842, and opened a school in Agra. The Pakistani section of the congregation came into existence in 1955, eight years after Pakistan's independence on 14 August 1947.

In 1856, the Congregation opened a school in Sialkot, which came within Pakistan at the time of partition, as also did the Convents of Lahore and Murree. Consequently, the history of the Religious of Jesus & Mary in Pakistan begins before the creation of Pakistan. At the start of the third millennium there were nine Convents in Pakistan; namely, Punjab (1856), Murree (1876), Lahore Convent (1876), Mariakhel | Mianwali (1956), Karachi (1957), Islamabad (1979), Lahore / Shadbagh (1986), and Toba Tek Singh (1999). Other foundations were made in Rawalpindi in 1881 and closed in 1893. Dalhousie (from Lahore) in 1897 and closed in 1900. Islamabad in 1975 and closed in 1992.

Since its inception the principal work of the Congregation is carried on by means of education for children from all social milieux. The latest venture in the development of CJM Pakistan was to open a centre at the Lahore Convent in 1999 for children with special needs, named Thevenet Centre after the Foundress; Saint Claudine Thevenet.

In 2011, the school celebrated its 135th year. Pakistan Post issued a commemorative on the occasion.

On February 15, 2012, the President of Pakistan approved the conferment of Sitara Quaid-e-Azam on Sister John Berchmans Conway, a former teacher of the school, for her services towards education and promoting interfaith harmony in Pakistan.

== Notable alumni ==
- Benazir Bhutto
- Mehreen Faruqi
- Syeda Abida Hussain
- Asma Jahangir
- Hina Jilani
- Tahira Naqvi
- Afia Nathaniel
- Maryam Nawaz
- Rubab Raza
- Arooj Aftab
- Shamim Hilaly
- Jugnu Mohsin
- Yasmin Rashid
- Shahtaj Qizilbash
- Yashodhra Katju
