= Mary Langan =

Irish Roman Catholic nun

Mary Langan RJM is an Irish Roman Catholic nun working in Pakistan since 1983. In 2013 the Tamgha-e-Quaid-e-Azam was conferred on her by President Asif Ali Zardari for her services in the field of education.

== Early life ==
Langan was born in Ireland on 17 June 1948. Her parents were Michael Langan, a contractor and Marian. She studied with the Sisters of Jesus and Mary at the boarding school in Gortnor Abbey, Crossmolina, County Mayo. In 1969, she joined the Congregation of Jesus and Mary in preparation for the religious life.

== Work in Pakistan ==
She arrived in Pakistan in 1983 and spent the first six years in Sialkot, teaching at the Convent of Jesus and Mary. She moved to the Convent of Jesus and Mary, Karachi, ending up as Principal of the school.

She has also taught liturgy to children and prepared them for Confirmation at the Catechetical Center, taught at the Notre Dame Institute of Education and nurses of the Holy Family Hospital. She has served on the Catholic Board of Education, Karachi and on the St. Anthony's Parish Council.

In April 2018, Sindh Chief Minister Murad Ali Shah broke ground for the new campus of the Convent of Jesus and Mary School at Clifton Polo Ground. He complimented Langan and the head mistress Sister Berchmans Conway and their team for maintaining high educational standards in the school.

== Golden Jubilee ==
On 24 April 2019 she celebrated the golden jubilee of her membership of the Congregation of Jesus and Mary. Celebrations began with Mass at St. Anthony's church concelebrated by Joseph Cardinal Coutts, Archbishop of Karachi, Benedict Travas, Bishop of Multan, and several priests.

== See also ==
- Congregation of Jesus and Mary
