= Convent of Jesus and Mary, Karachi =

Private school in Karachi, Pakistan

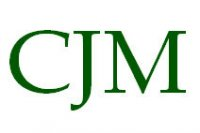

Location
- Karachi; Pakistan
- Coordinates: 24.8403°N 67.0345°E

Information
- Other name: CJM
- Type: Private primary and secondary school
- Religious affiliation: Catholicism
- Established: 1952; 74 years ago
- Oversight: Archdiocese of Karachi
- Principal: Sr. Mary Langan RJM
- Gender: Co-educational: K-Year 5; Girls: Year 6 onwards
- Houses: 4

The Convent of Jesus and Mary, Karachi is a private Catholic primary schools for boys and girls and a secondary school for girls only, located in Karachi, Pakistan. Founded in 1952, the school is owned by the Roman Catholic Archdiocese of Karachi. Admissions for the school are held around March.

== Overview ==
The school is divided into three sections:

- Preschool section—Class Prep 1 to Prep 2 (Age 4–6)
- Junior section—Class 1 to Class 5 (Age 6-11)
- Senior section—Class 6 to Class 11 (Age 11–16)

The school goes by the Cambridge System. CJM was started in Karachi with an aim to educate the girls of the clifton area, and has flourished ever since. Although it is a Catholic school, the majority of the student body is made up of Muslims. There are also Parsis and Hindus.

In addition to schooling the local Christian community, the Convent of Jesus and Mary, Karachi (along with its affiliate schools in Lahore, Murree, Mariakhel, Shadbagh, Sialkot, and Toba Tek Singh) have long been Pakistan's most elite all-girls educational institution. CJM has traditionally been run by Irish nuns, and now in recent decades, local nuns as well. It has schooled influential women, including Pakistan's first female prime minister, other leaders, social workers, activists, professionals, entrepreneurs, writers, entertainers, philanthropists, home-makers, and a countless number of women in the creative arts.

In 2012 Sister John Berchmans Conway was the Principal of the Convent of Jesus and Mary, Karachi. On February 15, 2012, the President of Pakistan approved conferment of Sitara Quaid-e-Azam on Sister Berchmans for her services towards education and promoting interfaith harmony in Pakistan. The government of Sindh presented land in Karachi to the sisters in appreciation of their educational work in the country. Governor Ishrat-ul-Ebad Khan of Sindh presented the 99-year lease papers for 1.5 acres (0.61 ha) to the Sisters during a ceremony on 24 September at Government House, Karachi. Sister John Berchmans Conway received the papers on behalf of the sisters.

In 2019 the principal was Sr. Mary Langan RJM.

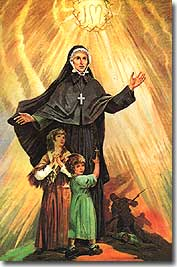
Saint Claudine Thevenet (Foundress of the Convent of Jesus and Mary)

== Houses ==
Each section of the school is divided into four groups:

- Courtesy (Blue)
- Discipline (Green)
- Endeavor (Red)
- Service (Yellow)

== Notable alumni ==
- Somy Ali, actress, fashion designer, journalist
- Benazir Bhutto (1953–2007) former prime minister of Pakistan
- Sharmeen Obaid-Chinoy, two Academy Award-winning filmmaker
- Tehmina Janjua, Ambassador of Pakistan to Italy
- Nergis Mavalvala, Pakistani American astrophysicist who is the Kathleen Marble Professor of Astrophysics at the Massachusetts Institute of Technology (MIT)
