= Brothers of the Sacred Heart =

Roman Catholic religious congregation for men

- Fratres a Sacratissimo Corde Jesu
- Abbreviation: S.C. (post-nominal letters)
- Formation: September 30, 1821; 205 years ago
- Founder: André Coindre
- Founded at: Lyon, France
- Type: Lay Religious Congregation of Pontifical Right (for Men)
- Headquarters: General Motherhouse; Piazza del Sacro Cuore, 3, Rome, Italy
- Members: 946 members (19 priests) as of 2018
- Superior General: Mark Edward Hilton
- Ministry: Educational work
- Website: brothersofthesacredheart.org

The Brothers of the Sacred Heart (Latin: Fratres a Sacratissimo Corde Iesu) is a Catholic lay religious congregation of Pontifical Right for Men founded by André Coindre (1787–1826) in 1821. Its constitution was modeled upon that of the Jesuits, while its rule of life was based upon the Rule of Saint Augustine. Its members bind themselves for life by simple vows of religion. Its members add the nominal S.C. after their names to indicate their membership in the congregation.

There are only a few ordained members in the Congregation, the vast majority of its members being lay brothers, who live in community in accordance with the congregation's rule of life. Though the objective purpose of the congregation has

evolved slightly over the years, its fundamental mission remains centered on the education of the young: in asylums, parochial and select schools, and colleges.

== Origin ==
At the beginning of the Brothers of the Sacred Heart 10 men gathered to God on September 30, 1821 following the priest of Lyon when the first brothers went to the Sanctuary of Our Lady of Fourvière to make their first vows. Father Andrés Coindre encouraged them not only in their dedication as Christians but also in the education and teaching of children and young people without resources, as good workers but also as good people and believers.

Father Andrés Coindre insisted on the importance of transmitting to the youngest that no one is perfect but despite that God loves us and that is why it is important to treat those around us in the same way.

200 years later, the mission continues to thrive, reaching communities in over 30 countries around the world.

The best decade occurred in 1830, when both the number of boys and girls and the number of looms increased.

In 1833, Claudine Thévenet wrote that “The workshops are going better than ever. We have two new looms that work perfectly and if we had a hundred, we would find a place to place them.”

However, in 1840 there was a flood that left the workshops unusable for a time. Because of this, groups of workers demanded that the looms owned by the religious orders be closed and that they not be allowed to open new ones, despite the archbishop's commitment not to authorize the opening of new looms. Violent gangs of workers assault and destroy a dozen workshops, it is the so-called “Los Voraces” revolt.

It was Father Francisco Vicente Coindre who was in charge of protecting the children from the looms that were destroyed. He considered it important to highlight that the people who committed the destruction were motivated by an economic and work motive, not anti-religious.

Time passes and after constant construction and avoiding buildings larger than really necessary, brother Xavier manages to regain control by selling the brothers' property, that is, the Pieux Secours, and opening a small boarding school.

== Founder ==
Andrés Coindre was a French Catholic priest and founder of the Congregation of the Brothers of the Sacred Heart of Jesus. He was born on February 26, 1787 in Lyon, France, in a period marked by the political and social upheaval of the French Revolution. Little is known about his childhood, although it is presumed that he grew up in the midst of the political and social unrest that shook his country. He received his primary education at a public school in Lyon from 1799 to 1802, where he demonstrated academic excellence, especially in French.

On June 14, 1812 he was ordained a priest in the cathedral of Lyon. Because of his preaching ability, he spent an additional six months in the major seminary to hone his oratory talents.

After completing his training, he was assigned as vicar in Bourg-en-Bresse, where in addition to his parish duties, he demonstrated his abilities as a preacher and participated in the organization of missions to revitalize Christian life in the region.

In 1815, the vicar general of the diocese invited him to join a group of priests to form a team of itinerant missionaries, known as the "Carthusians". Coindre stood out as coordinator and leader of these missions, where his eloquence and religious fervor left a deep impression on the faithful.

Coindre worked with St. Claudine Thévenet in 1815 establishing the Association of the Sacred Heart ion Lyon, which three years later became the congregation of the Religious of Jesus and Mary. Coindre was instrumental in encouraging Claudine Thévenet to become a consecrated religious and to found the RJM. The RJM have grown to a congregation of over 1,000 sisters in 29 countries with a primary focus on education, especially schools for girls.

In addition to his missionary work, Coindre was active in prison ministry, especially with young prisoners. His concern for his future after prison led him to found Pío Socorro, an institution aimed at helping young people released from prison reintegrate into society and stay away from crime. In 1821 he founded the Congregation of the Brothers of the Sacred Heart of Jesus, dedicated to the education and training of young people, especially those most in need. Coindre dedicated his life to the service of others and died on May 30, 1826 in Lyon, leaving a lasting legacy of charity and education.

== History ==
=== Foundations ===
André Coindre was a survivor of the chaos created in French society by the Reign of Terror at the end of the French Revolution. Though only a child at the time, out of this experience, he became committed to providing the moral, intellectual and religious development of the many boys left orphaned by the upheavals of this era. As a young man, Coindre entered the seminary of the Diocese of Lyon, France, and eventually was ordained as a secular priest of the diocese. During his period of preparation for his ministry, he came to envision men and women trained to work with the poor through education.

The first steps toward a concrete expression of this vision took place with his participation in the foundation in 1815 of the Religious of Jesus and Mary by Claudine Thévenet, the daughter of a merchant in the silk trade, for which Lyon had become noted. Like Coindre, Thévenet had survived the horrors of the late Revolutionary period.

Under the guidance of Coindre, whom she had taken as her spiritual director, Thévenet gathered friends around her to offer shelter and basic education for poor girls, whom she considered the "weakest, the most shameful, the most deprived" of post-Revolutionary French society. As founder of her Congregation, she became known as Mary St. Ignatius, and was canonized by Pope John Paul II in 1983.

=== The establishment of the Brothers ===
In 1818 Coindre established an orphanage and trade school for homeless boys. His vision finally became a reality with the admission of the first group of men to a new foundation of Brothers in 1821, with Coindre himself acting as the Superior of the community, while remaining a secular priest attached to the Diocese. The direct administration of the lives of the Brothers was left to Brother Borgia, who acted as the Director of the Institute.

The early growth of the congregation was slow. At the period of its origin the social and political conditions in France, still undergoing huge upheavals from the Revolution, was very unfavorable to the growth of religious communities. Lyon, the cradle of the congregation, suffered sorely in these tumultuous early revolutionary days. However, a greater impediment to its growth lay in the ill-defined system of government under which Coindre oversaw the Congregation. When the Brothers requested that he give them a definite rule, as he had done for the Sisters, his response was:

Rules and regulations are not perfect until and unless experience has revealed what must be done and what must be avoided. For now, make do with something provisional, and one day we shall see to the rest.

Coindre's body was found on 20 May 1826 in Blois, where he was assigned at the time as Senior Vicar of the Diocese. For various reasons, there was long held some suspicion that his sudden and unexpected death might have been a suicide. There is evidence, though, that he was one of a number of the local clergy who were victims of an outbreak of acute meningitis. One consequence of this shadow regarding his death was that the first Superior General of the Institute rarely referred to him or his teachings. Following his death, his brother, François Coindre, his cousin, succeeded him in the office of Superior.

=== The Congregation takes root ===
In 1840, François Coindre assembled the first General Chapter of the Congregation. During the discussions of the Chapter, opinion among the Brothers was unanimous that it was necessary for the success of the Congregation that its affairs be in the hands of the Brothers themselves, and that one of their number should be Superior General. The question was referred to de Bonald, the Archbishop of Lyon, who, after an exhaustive examination, judged it advisable that Coindre should resign the office. On 13 September 1841, Polycarp was unanimously chosen by the Brothers as their first Superior General.

Polycarp went on to reconstruct the government of the Institute and gave it stability and permanency. He is considered their second founder among the Brothers, and his cause for canonization has been proceeding since 1902. In February 1984, Polycarp was declared Venerable by Pope John Paul II.

== Ideological Formation ==
- Gospel: Jesus is spoken of in one of his teachings to his apostles. We hear the gospel
- Reflection: We reflect on the gospel.
- Effort and discipline: We maintain focus and dedication on specific goals with great effort.
- Prayer: We turn to God to ask and thank him.

== Expansion ==
At the time of Polycarp's death in 1859, there were over 400 Brothers in France alone staffing some 70 schools, an increase of sixty during his leadership. He had, moreover, at the invitation of Bishop Michael Portier of the Diocese of New Orleans, extended their presence to the United States, a new field of labor for the Institute, at Mobile, Alabama. The first Brothers arrived there in January 1847. Within twenty-five years, the Brothers in the United States had grown to such an extent that they were established as a separate Province of the Congregation. 1854-2004

In 1854 the Brothers of the Sacred Heart established St. Stanislaus College in Bay Saint Louis Mississippi. St. Stanislaus is the oldest institution of learning on the Mississippi Gulf Coast. Chartered in 1870 as St. Stanislaus College, the school became a college preparatory in 1923. In over 150 years the Brothers and faculty at St. Stanislaus have trained more than 10,000 young men in the principles of Christian doctrine and education.

In September 1869, the Brothers founded St. Aloysius High School in the French Quarter of New Orleans. This school merged with Cor Jesu High School in 1969 to form Brother Martin High School, which still serves the youth of that city.

In 1872, the Province of the United States extended its schools into Canada, and in 1880 transferred its novitiate from Indianapolis to Arthabaskaville (Arthabaska), in Quebec, Canada. In 1894, the brothers founded St Vincent Academy (now known as Catholic High School) a 6 time blue ribbon school winner, in Baton Rouge, Louisiana. In 1895, four Brothers were sent to Hawaii to help care for the healthy sons of lepers quarantined on the island of Molokai, which was an outgrowth of the labors of the recently deceased Damien of Molokai.

The growth of the Congregation in Canada was so rapid, that, by the end of the 19th century, it was deemed advisable to erect the establishments in Canada into a separate Province. This was effected by a decree of the General Chapter of the Society held at Paradis, near Le Puy-en-Velay, France, in 1900. About that same time, both a house of studies for postulants and a novitiate for the United States Province were established at Metuchen, New Jersey.

In 1939, at the request of Bishop Thomas Edmund Molloy, the Brothers of the Sacred Heart bought West Neck Farms in Huntington, Long Island, New York, intending to establish a boarding school and summer retreat. It was founded by Martinian, Provincial Superior, and named Coindre Hall in memory of André Coindre, the founder of the order. The school was intended to generate funds for the formation and education of young members of the order. It closed on June 30, 1971, due to a lack of teachers. At the time of its closing there were 116 students.

Not unlike many other religious communities in the Catholic Church, the congregation saw a tremendous surge in vocations just prior to the Second Vatican Council. However, as with other groups, a substantial number of these men subsequently left the Institute. Africa and South America remain the two regions where vocations to the Institute are at their highest.

== Biography ==
=== Early years ===
Brother Polycarp was the third of the four children of Jean-Joseph Gondre and Victoire Gonsalin; he was born August 21, 1801, at La-Motte-en-Champsaur. He was baptized and called Jean-Hippolyte.

The family was noted for its simplicity and Christian faith, fighting the dangers that followed the social upheavals in France.

Brother Polycarp spent his childhood years at his parents' home, where he received his first notions of catechism. Later on, he began to attend the village school and in the summer he helped in the shepherding of sheep and various jobs in the fields.

In the meadow known as "Roca del Aire", he built a small oratory where he placed an image of the Virgin Mary, which he often adorned with flowers; he often went there to pray. In that place also, as a teacher, he piously went with his students before finishing his classes.

Gentleness of soul, simplicity and docility were some of the qualities that, both at home and at school, represented Hippolyte's youthful years. He made his first communion and later received the sacrament of confirmation.

On October 9, 1822, at the age of 21, Brother Polycarp obtained the title that enabled him to teach, and a few days later, he obtained authorization to open a school in La Motte.

Vocation:

Brother Polycarp was very close to some members of the Institute of the Brothers of the Sacred Heart from Gap. Admiring their religious life, he thought of following in their footsteps. Brother Ciprien was the one who facilitated Brother Polycarp's entry into the community.

At the age of 26, Hippolyte was admitted to the Institute by the priest F.V. Coindre in the city of Lyon. He took the habit on September 16, 1827, changing his name from Hippolyte to Polycarp.

Brother Polycarp's activity from 1830 to 1841:

The civil war of July 1830 devastated the city of Lyon, and most of the novices had to return home. Brother Polycarp was sent as Director of the school at Vals, not far from Le Puy. He performed his mission so well that Vals became a model institution.

In 1835, Brother Polycarp was elected second Assistant General, and at the same time he was entrusted with the formation of novices, first in Vals and then in Lyon (1837).

On September 1, 1837, he obtained a new teaching diploma, which enabled him to teach in elementary school.

The novitiate was transferred to Paradis in 1838, with Brother Polycarp as Director.

Brother Polycarp was later elected to the highest office in the Congregation. The Congregation had a Superior General who was capable, prudent, charitable and a good ruler.

During these five years and in spite of his illnesses, Brother Polycarp worked to establish religious discipline, resolve difficulties, fill in gaps and perfect the work undertaken by the Founder. He visited each and every house of the Institute every year.

Finally, Brother Polycarp was elected Superior General in perpetuity.

Brother Polycarp's work as General (1846–1858):

-He impelled his brothers toward improvement, with wise moderation and frankness he did not hesitate to remind each one of the norm of conduct he should follow. If, on the one hand, he abhorred bad habits and laziness, on the other hand, he was horrified by extreme severity and rigidity in the education of the young.

-He founded new houses, to the number of 82, 76 in France and 6 in the United States. He left a Congregation that was threatened with ruin, flourishing and vigorous.

-Thanks to the good work of Brother Polycarp and the esteem he enjoyed, the Supreme Council of Public Instruction issued the decree of legal recognition on June 19, 1851.

-Brother Polycarp visited the communities of the Institute every year. These visits produced an excellent religious spirit.

Last illness and death of Brother Polycarp:

Brother Polycarp's health was in great danger in the year 1843 when, on his return to Paradis, he felt so ill that he asked to have the last sacraments administered. Surprisingly regained his health, he wrote a letter of thanks to the confreres. However, illness quickly overtook him again, and he died on January 9, 1859, at the age of 57. He had led the congregation for 17 years.

Brother Polycarp was buried in a corner of the Paradis orchard, where the cemetery was located. He remained there until 1927, when his mortal remains were exhumed and canonically recognized.

== Current status ==
As of 2010, there are some 1,200 Brothers of the Sacred Heart serving in 32 countries. They have institutions throughout Europe and Africa, and in both North America and South America, as well as in the Philippines and Madagascar in the Pacific Ocean.

The address of the General Motherhouse of the Congregation is: Piazza del Sacro Cuore, No. 3, 00151 Rome, Italy.
