= St. Anthony's Parish (Karachi) =

St. Anthony's Church
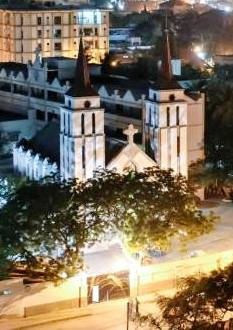
- Location: McNeil Road, Karachi
- Country: Pakistan
- Denomination: Roman Catholic
- Website: stanthonykhi.org

History
- Founded: February 13, 1937
- Founder: Fr. Aquina van Liebergen O.F.M.
- Dedicated: 1950

Architecture
- Architectural type: Gothic
- Groundbreaking: June 25, 1939

Specifications
- Capacity: 300 (1950)

Administration
- Archdiocese: Roman Catholic Archdiocese of Karachi
- Parish: St. Anthony’s Parish

Clergy
- Priest: Fr. Melito Dias

St. Anthony's Parish is part of the Roman Catholic Archdiocese of Karachi in Pakistan.

== History ==
The idea of St. Anthony's Parish was first conceived in 1937. A plot of land with a large bungalow was acquired on McNeil Road.

The largest room was converted into a small church, two rooms served as the presbytery while the two others would be a school. On February 13, 1937, a relic of St. Anthony was brought in procession and the first parish priest Fr. Aquina van Liebergen O.F.M. was appointed.

In 1941 it had 829 parishioners.

In the first year of the parish, the first to be Baptised in the new parish was Anthony Joseph Mahnga.

On June 25, 1939, the foundation stone of the present church was laid, but due to the war, it was decided to postpone the construction.

In 1941 the old church was painted and renovated just before the feast of Pentecost. The new antependium of the altar, the work of a generous lady artist, was used for the first time on the feast. At the time, Fr. Valens Wienk O.F.M was the parish priest. Collection of funds for the building of the church carried on and the new church was dedicated to St. Anthony of Padua in the early 1950s. The architect of this church, built in traditional Gothic style was Bro. Hilary Lardenoye O.F.M.

It had a seating capacity of about 300. In the compound of the church is a beautiful grotto honoring Mary.

The Apostolic Nunciature to Pakistan was also located in the parish in its Chancellery at old Clifton after the Vatican established diplomatic relations with Pakistan on July 17, 1950.

The only person from this parish to be conferred the sacrament of Holy Orders was Fr. Theophilus D’Souza on January 9, 1972. However, St. Anthony's has given seven members to the religious life.

In July 1986, the parish which had been administered by the Franciscans since its beginning, was handed over to Diocesan priests.

In the 2004, the church's seating capacity was expanded by building an extension on its left side.

== Parish priests ==
- Fr. Aquina van Liebergen, O.F.M
- Fr. Valens Weink, O.F.M.
- Fr. Gordon Weink O.F.M.
- Fr. Xavier Paes O.F.M.
- Fr. Erastus O.F.M.
- Fr. Michael D'Cruz O.F.M.
- Fr. Cyprian Dias O.F.M.
- Fr. Joshua Sterk O.F.M.
- Fr. Robert D'Silva
- Fr. Melito Dias
- Fr. Benny Travas
- Fr. Edward Joseph
- Fr. Joseph D'Mello
- Fr. Robert D'Silva
- Fr. Melito Dias
- Friar Clifford Augustine(Acting Parish Priest)
- Fr. Mario Rodrigues
- Fr. Edward Joseph
- Fr. Arthur Charles

== Current situation ==
The parish is multi-lingual, with Masses said in English daily, Urdu weekly, and Punjabi, Tamil and Konkani on special feasts.

In 2011, the parish is estimated to provide spiritual care to 15,000 people largely due to inter-parish migration and the construction of many housing units in the vicinity of the Church. The territory includes the affluent areas of Clifton and the Defence Housing Society. In Feb. 2011 the parish included about 1,250 English- and about 1,600 Urdu-speaking families.

Over the years the following groups have functioned in the parish, Parish Council, Senior, Junior and Children's Choirs (English and Urdu), Legion of Mary ( several presidia), Vincent de Paul Society, Youth group (English and Urdu), Lectors’ group (English and Urdu), Eucharistic Ministers, Ushers and Collectors, Family of Jesus and Mary, Familia group, Sunday school (English and Urdu) and Security group. The parish also has chapters of the Catholic Women's Guild, Women's Sodality and the Goinkars’ Own Academy.

The old St. Anthony's School, built along the wall of the compound was demolished and in its place, on the opposite side, an imposing three storied structure was constructed for the school which incorporated a hall to seat the overflow of parishioners from the church in 1990.

Every Tuesday, a large number of devotees from all over Karachi make the pilgrimage to the church to attend the special prayers to St. Anthony. So also, a large number of the faithful attend the Tridensina prayers which culminate in the Feast of the patron on June 13. The Novena to Our Lady of Valankani in September is also heavily attended by people from all over Karachi.

The Fete after the Patron's Feast draws large crowds and affords an opportunity to the parishioners not only to socialise, but also raises funds for the charitable undertakings of the parish.

The parish also caters to the needs of new communities and Masses are said in the newly constructed premises of the Presbytery (in Civil Lines), Stella Maris (old Clifton) and Shirin Jinnah Colony (near the Boating Basin). The parish is also home to a number of religious communities such as the Congregation of Jesus and Mary, Sisters of the Good Shepherd and the Daughters of the Cross.

The parish also fields a soccer team and participated in the Karachi Goan Association Gymkhana All-Christian football tournament on 23 November 2003 at the KGA ground. The inaugural match was played between St. Lawrence's Parish and St. Anthony's Parish.

St Anthony's Church has made it onto the Sindh government's new list of 1,016 buildings to be classified as heritage listed.

On 25 March 2012, more than 600 people gathered at the Church for a special Mass to celebrate Sister John Berchmans Conway and Fr. Robert McCulloch receiving the country's highest civilian award - Sitara-e-Quaid-e-Azam, for their services in the fields of education, health and promoting interfaith harmony.

In 2012, as part of its 75th anniversary celebrations, the parish has started a free medical care program for the poor.

On 5 October 2019 the Archbishop announced that Fr. Arthur Charles would be the new parish priest of the Parish.

== Famous parishioners ==
- Air Commodore Dr Hilary Zuzarte, Sitara-e-Basalat
- Sr. John Berchmans Conway RJM, was decorated by the Government of Pakistan for her services in education and promoting interfaith harmony.
- Sr. Mary Langan RJM, awarded the Tamgha-e-Quaid-e-Azam by the Government of Pakistan for her services in the field of education.

== Security ==
Since 2002 the Parish has had to employ security guards to protect church and worshippers against 2 yearsterrorist attacks.
