= Berchmans =

Berchmans may refer to:

People:

- John Berchmans (Dutch: Jan Berchmans) (13 March 1599 – 13 August 1621), a Jesuit Scholastic and a saint in the Roman Catholic Church.
- John Berchmans Conway, a Roman Catholic religious sister working in Pakistan for 60 years.
- Emmanuel Berchmans Devlin, a Canadian politician.
- Fr. John Berchmans Puthuparambil, the First Indian Capuchin Provincial.
