= Robert McCulloch (priest) =

SQA Robert McCulloch
- Born: 1946 (age 79–80); Alexandra, Victoria, Australia
- Education: Master of Arts in Church History
- Alma mater: Catholic University of America, Washington, D.C.
- Occupation: Catholic priest
- Years active: 1970 -
- Employer(s): Catholic Diocese of Hyderabad, Pakistan
- Organization: Society of St. Columban
- Known for: improving the education and basic health care of the poor of Sindh Province, Pakistan
- Notable work: translation of Catholic Catechism into Urdu language
- Board member of: St. Elizabeth's Hospital, Hyderabad; Centre of Academic Excellence
- Parent(s): Bruce John McCulloch and Jean Frances Crowe
- Awards: Sitara-e-Quaid-i-Azam

Robert McCulloch SSC is an Australian priest and member of the Missionary Society of St. Columban, who served in Pakistan from 1978 to 2011. He was decorated by the Government of Pakistan for his services to health and education in 2012.

== Early life ==
McCulloch was born in 1946 in Alexandra, Victoria, to Bruce John McCulloch and Jean Frances Crowe. He was educated at St Patrick's School, Mentone, Our Lady of the Assumption Parish Primary School, Cheltenham, and St Bede's College, Mentone.

McCulloch entered the Society of St Columban in 1964, spending his initial year of probation in Sassafras, Victoria. He began his studies at St Columban's Seminary in Sydney in 1965 and was ordained a priest in 1970. In 1976 he received a Master of Arts in Church History from The Catholic University of America in Washington, D.C. Since 1978 he has worked to increase the education and basic health care of the poor and mainly non-Christian people of Pakistan.

== Work in Pakistan ==
McCulloch has served in two Diocese of Hyderabad parishes: Kotri, a rural area 100 miles (160 km) east of Karachi; and Machar Colony, a community of 300 Catholic families in the slums of Hyderabad. After a spell in Badin, he started working with the semi-nomadic Hindu tribe of Parkari Kohli in Tharparkar District. During this period, McCulloch helped the tribe design an alphabet for their language, for which he called on two linguists for their help. After the local population had opted for using the Sindhi alphabet, with a few minor changes, people gathered proverbs and sayings and launched the first Parkari Kohli newspaper, Prem Paracha. In this he helped to save the native language and culture.

McCulloch has had as a goal of his ministry the improvement of health care in the country. He sits on the administrative board for St. Elizabeth's Hospital, Hyderabad. He has established an outreach medical program at the hospital to provide vaccinations for infants and children, medical care for their mothers, and diagnosis and care of tuberculosis patients.

McCulloch has also developed schools in Pakistan that are now attended by more than 550 children. He has chaired the Board of Governors for the Centre of Academic Excellence, a project he initiated in 2007 to provide educational, spiritual, moral and personal formation for 100 Catholic boys.

McCulloch has lectured at the National Catholic Institute of Theology in Karachi, Pakistan in liturgy and church history.

McCulloch has established a palliative care unit. It is the first home-based palliative care unit for the terminally ill in Pakistan.

The St. Vincent de Paul Society of Victoria, through its overseas development initiatives, is providing ongoing financial support for McCulloch's health and educational programs.

In October 2012, the head of the Vatican's Pontifical Council for Promoting the New Evangelization, Archbishop Rino Fisichella launched Parts I and II of the Catholic Catechism in Urdu. McCulloch was involved in its translation from 2004 to 2012. Along with Emmanuel Neno this work was completed in 2014. The Pontifical Council for Promoting the New Evangelization has approved the Urdu translation and authorised its publication. The translation took 13 years to complete.

== Award ==
On 15 February 2012, the President of Pakistan approved conferment of Sitara class of the Nishan-e-Quaid-i-Azam on McCulloch for his services to Pakistan in health and education.

On 25 March 2012, more than 600 people gathered at St Anthony's Church in Karachi for a special Mass to celebrate Sister John Berchmans Conway RJM and McCulloch receiving the country's highest civilian award.

McCulloch has been transferred to Rome and is serving as the Procurator General of the Society of St Columban.

On 9 May 2012, McCulloch was inducted into the St Bede's Old Collegians Hall of Fame.
