= St. Elizabeth's Hospital, Hyderabad =

St. Elisabeth's Hospital
- Roman Catholic Diocese of Hyderabad

Geography
- Location: Hyderabad, Sindh, Pakistan

Organisation
- Care system: Public
- Type: Teaching
- Religious affiliation: Catholic
- Patron: Fr. Robert McCulloch
- Network: includes School of midwifery

Services
- Beds: 110
- Speciality: Ante-natal, natal and post-natal care; TB care; Ophthalmic and skin conditions; Emergency department; Home-based palliative care

History
- Opened: 1958

Links
- Lists: Hospitals in Pakistan

St. Elizabeth's Hospital, Hyderabad is a 100-bed health-care facility established in Pakistan in 1958.

== Services ==
It serves the people of Hyderabad and the lower areas of Sindh province. Not only is it a hospital but a facility for training nurses and midwives to guarantee the future for Pakistani women and babies. St Elizabeth's Hospital was established in 1958 and is a non-profit institution. It is owned by the Roman Catholic Diocese of Hyderabad and is run on its behalf by the Medical Board of the Diocese. Since 1975 it has been staffed by Pakistani personnel.

In 2010, St. Elizabeth Hospital is the sole medical provider for 12,000 people in nearby villages. Free medication is provided. The major health issues that need attention are: a. Provision of ante-natal, natal and post- natal care b. Infantile anaemia c. General medical care for all sexes and age, including diagnosis, treatment, and provision of medicines d. TB diagnosis with referral to the TB care centre to the Government TB Sanatorium in Hyderabad e. Hepatitis A, B and C diagnosis and treatment. f. Treatment of common ophthalmic and skin conditions and diseases. In 2020, the hospital is providing free health care to 50,000 people.

== School of midwifery ==
Three Holy Family sisters from Sri Lanka supervise the nursing and oversee the St Elizabeth's School of Midwifery. The School is attached to the hospital and trains nurses and midwives. The young women students come from all over Pakistan. At the time of selection, special preference is given to those who come from less developed areas and from marginalised communities with a view to advancing the socio-economic position of these women and to provide trained professional personnel for mothers, neo-natal and infant care in Pakistan. The total cost to educate one student is approximately Rs.180,000 [US$2,500].

In 2008, 53 women were enrolled in the 18-month program of studies. The School is registered with the Sindh Board of Midwifery. In spite of the disadvantaged background of most of the young women who enroll, students from St Elizabeth's School of Midwifery consistently obtain some of the top three places in the annual Sindh Board of Midwifery examinations.

The midwifery program at St. Elizabeth Hospital in Hyderabad aims both at benefiting the poor and improving the country's health-care system. In 1996, all 10 students who took the government midwifery exam passed. St. Elizabeth admits 25 candidates for midwifery training annually. In Pakistan's strictly Islamic society, mainly Christian women take to nursing. Seventy percent of the patients are women and children. The hospital is headed by Mr. James Francis, the Administrator of the hospital, appointed in July 1988 by the then Bishop of Hyderabad Bonaventure Patrick Paul. Until 1996, Fr. Robert McCulloch was the Chairman of the Administrative Council.

Twenty out of twenty-one students passed the final examinations conducted by the Sindh Nurses’ Examination Board 2009, eighteen obtaining 1st Division and two 2nd Division.

Fr. Robert McCulloch, a former chairman of the hospital's Administrative Council, was recently awarded the Sitara-i-Quaid-i-Azam by President Asif Ali Zardari for his work in Pakistan.

Since its inception the School of Midwifery has produced more than 680 midwives who now serve throughout the country.

== Flood damage ==
Low-lying areas of Hyderabad were inundated by floodwaters from the worst ever seen floods of 2010. At the hospital all patients were moved to the upper floors, but the equipments on the ground floor, including the power generator, operating theaters and x-ray clinic, were submerged.

== Palliative care ==
The hospital now has a Centre for Home Based Palliative Care, mainly to serve cancer patients. The centre is able to serve 40,000 patients a year.

== Emergency department ==
A hi-tech emergency department was launched at the hospital on 12 September 2020. The facility was built with the collaboration of public bodies, donors, missionaries and doctors.
