= Gortnor Abbey =

Catholic secondary school in Crossmolina, Ireland

Jesus and Mary Secondary School

Location
- Crossmolina, County Mayo; Ireland; 54.0975°N 9.2996°W

Information
- Other name: Gortnor Abbey
- Type: Voluntary secondary school
- Religious affiliation: Catholic (Convent of Jesus and Mary)
- Established: 1912
- Principal: Caroline Harrison
- Gender: Co-educational
- Enrollment: 604 (2025)
- Website: gortnorabbey.ie

Gortnor Abbey, officially Jesus and Mary Secondary School, is a co-educational Catholic secondary school in Crossmolina, County Mayo, Ireland. Located near Lough Conn, it is run by the Convent of Jesus and Mary. The school was established in 1912. As of 2025, it had an enrollment of approximately 600 pupils.

== Notable people ==
- Margaret Heneghan (b. 1959) - retired High Court judge
- Mary Langan (b. 1948) - Roman Catholic nun awarded the Tamgha-e-Quaid-e-Azam by the Government of Pakistan for her services in the field of education.
- Niamh O'Malley - artist
- Michael Moyles (b. 1977) - Gaelic footballer for Mayo.
- Deirdre Purcell (1945-2023) - Irish author
- Marc Roberts (b. 1968) - singer
- Stephen Rochford (b. 1978) - Gaelic footballer and coach
- Kobe McDonald (b. 2007) - footballer
