= Convent of Jesus and Mary, Mussoorie =

Boarding school in Uttarakhand, India

Convent of Jesus and Mary
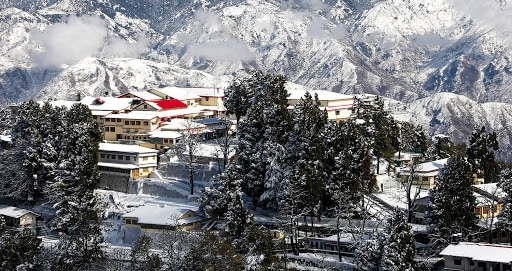
- Waverley, Mussoorie India

Information
- School type: Boarding school
- Founded: 1845; 181 years ago
- Founder: Religious of Jesus and Mary
- Current Principal: Sr.Shyma Jose (Since 2020)
- Gender: Girls
- Age: 6 to 18
- Enrollment: 600
- Houses: 4
- Affiliation: CBSE
- Former pupils: Waverlites
- Website: www.cjmwaverley.org

Convent of Jesus and Mary, popularly known as CJM Waverley, is a boarding school in Mussoorie, India. It was founded in 1845 by the Religious of Jesus and Mary, Mussoorie Education Society. It is a residential school for girls and is the oldest girls-only boarding school in the country. CJM Waverley is recognized by the Government of Uttarakhand and is affiliated to the Central Board of Secondary Education (CBSE).

== History ==
Convent of Jesus and Mary, Waverley, was established on 18 September 1845, by the religious of Jesus and Mary. The school is a recognized Christian Minority Institution, affiliated with the CBSE. Situated at an elevation of 6,600 feet above sea level, this all-girls residential and day school, is in the small hill station of Mussoorie, in the North Indian state of Uttarakhand.

== Houses ==
The pupils attending the school have been designated Houses. All the Houses have a House Captain who is assisted by a Vice-Captain. The Houses are:

- Endurance (Yellow House)
- Endeavour (Red House)
- Encounter (Green House)
- Enterprise (Blue House)

== Curriculum and Extracurricular activities ==
CJM Waverley is an English medium school affiliated with the Central Board of Secondary Education, with classes from Class I to Class XII. Common subjects taught are English, Hindi, Sanskrit, mathematics, science (physics, chemistry, and biology), history, civics, geography, art, craft, singing, computer education, catechism/moral formation, physical education, general knowledge, Indian dancing, and classical music. Through the courses, the social and civic duties of loyal citizens are emphasized.

=== Physical education ===
- Physical Training Games and Sports are compulsory activities, not the School Curriculum.

=== Dance and music ===
Dance is a subject in all classes. Students learn various classical and contemporary dance forms. They show their skills in various cultural programs at the school and interschool levels.

Music is an important part of the curriculum. The girls learn Hindi and English singing. They also learn a variety of Indian and Western instruments. Girls can choose an instrument they would like to learn from the various Indian and Western music instructors. The school offers lessons in instruments including sitar, harmonium, tabla, violin, guitar, piano, drums, and synthesizer. Girls get many chances to show their talent at school functions and inter-school cultural fests.

=== Extra-curricular activities ===
The school also has several co-curricular and extra-curricular activities. Debates, declamation, elocution, extempore, story-telling, dramatics, etc. are conducted both in the English and Hindi languages.

=== Clubs ===
The students of classes VI to XII are also divided into various clubs including:

- The Literary Club
- The Science Club
- The Social Service Club
- The Ecology Club

=== Formation lessons ===
Students are given classes for moral education.

== Notable alumni ==
- Satya Nadella - Microsoft CEO
- Suvarna Jha – Model and actress
- Priyanka Gill – British fashion journalist, entrepreneur, and angel investor
- Pema Chagzoetsang – Member of the Tibetan Parliament in-exile
- Malvika Mehra - Indian advertising and design professional. Founder and former Creative Director of Tomorrow Creative Lab. Chief Creative Officer, Dentsu India.
- Shruti Sharma - Shruti Sharma is an Indian model, beauty pageant contestant and actress. She was the first runner-up and winner of Miss India World title at the 2002 Femina Miss India pageant. She represented India at the 2002 Miss World pageant held in London and made it to the semi-finals.

== See also ==
- Convent of Jesus and Mary
