= Emmanuel Neno =

- Born: Sahiwal, Punjab, Pakistan
- Education: Fordham University; St. Patrick's College (Karachi)
- Occupations: Executive Secretary at Catholic Bishops Catechetical Commission, Pakistan

Emmanuel Neno is a Pakistani Christian author and translator.

== Major work ==
Along with Robert McCulloch he completed a new Urdu translation of the Catechism of the Catholic Church in 2014. The Pontifical Council for Promoting the New Evangelization has approved the Urdu translation and authorised its publication. It took thirteen years to complete. The Pakistan Board for the National Language has praised the translation project for its contribution to Pakistani culture and the Urdu language.

In October 2012, Parts 1 & 2 of the Urdu translation of the Catechism of the Catholic Church were presented to Rino Fisichella, President of the Pontifical Council for New Evangelization, by Bishop Sebastian Shaw from Pakistan and Robert McCulloch in Rome.

== Career ==
Neno has a master's degree in Religion and Religious Education from Fordham University in New York City.

Neno was one of five Pakistani lay people sent for a two-year study program in Rome in the early 1980s to foster lay participation in the Church in Pakistan.

He participated in the first Summer University held 1988 in Switzerland, France, Italy and Lichtenstein, organised by the International Christian Organisation of the Media. In 1991, when India and Pakistan hosted the Summer University, Neno was one of the organisers.

He is the executive secretary of Catholic Bishops Catechetical Commission in Pakistan. He is also the former director of Catechetical Centre, Karachi. In October 2010, he attended the fifth Catholic Press Congress organized by the Pontifical Council for Social Communications. He has translated 25 books and authored several publications including A Dictionary of New Christian Terminology.

He was also a contributor to the first ongoing formation program, preached in January 2013 by Sebastian Francis Shaw, in Lahore, to celebrate the year of faith declared by the Pope from October 2012 to November 2013.

In October 2019, along with his son, a software engineer, Neno launched a mobile app that offers daily reflections on the Gospel and looks up the liturgical and Biblical meanings of Christian terms that are not available in Urdu dictionaries.
