= Our Lady of Fatima Church, Karachi =

Our Lady of Fatima Church
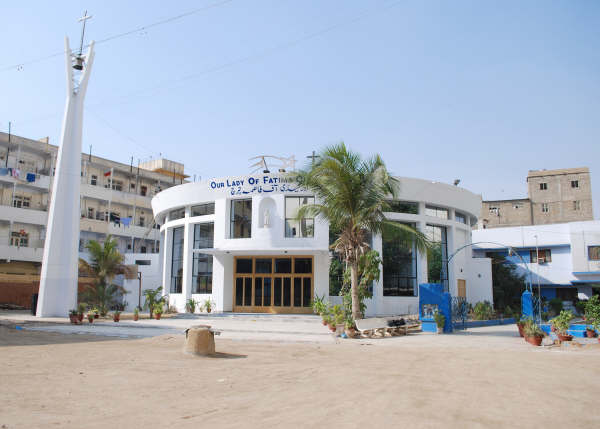
- Our Lady of Fatima church and courtyard
- Our Lady of Fatima Church
- 24.86672°N 67.02199°E
- Location: Randle Road, Karachi
- Country: Pakistan
- Denomination: Roman Catholic

History
- Founded: August 22, 1953
- Founder: Most Rev. James Cornelius Van Miltenburg
- Dedicated: 8 September 1963

Architecture
- Architectural type: Circular

Administration
- Archdiocese: Roman Catholic Archdiocese of Karachi

Our Lady of Fatima Church, Karachi is part of the Roman Catholic Archdiocese of Karachi. It is the only church located in Karachi which has a circular architectural design and is built in accordance with the guidelines provided by the Second Vatican Council.

Our Lady of Fatima School for girls, which offers education from grades 1–10, is located in the vicinity of the parish. The parish also used to operate the Archdiocesan Redemptoris Mater Missionary Seminary, the current parish priest is Rev. Fr. Joshua Rangel

== History ==
The church was approved on 22 August 1953, when the Most Rev. James Cornelius van Miltenburg (the late Archbishop of Karachi) set the boundaries of the new parish. In May 1955, it became a chaplaincy under St. Patrick's Cathedral with resident priests. In September 1957, it became an independent parish.

On 13 July 1962, the foundation stone of the present church building was blessed and laid by H. E. Mgr. Xavier Zupie, the Vatican Internuncio. On 8 September 1963, the church was blessed and dedicated to Our Lady of Fatima. This is the name given to the miraculous appearance of the blessed Virgin Mary in the small village of Fatima in Portugal. According to the legend, the Virgin Mary appeared to three shepherd children in 1917.

The church has a circular shape with large glass windows around the facade. The seating is in a semi-circular shape around the altar. The church has been heritage-listed.

The church grounds also contain a bell tower which summons the faithful to prayer and a grotto dedicated to Our Lady, depicting Mary's apparition to the 3 children in Fatima.

== Parish Boundaries ==
The following areas come under the operation of the parish:

- Doli Khata
- Misquita Housing Society
- Plaza Quarters
- Patrick Palace
- Rehman Heights
- Reno Centre
- Al-Noor Centre
- Rehman Plaza
- Southern Cooperative Housing
- Jubilee area
- Rivoli area
- Police Headquarters
- Tabela Basti

== Parish Priests ==
In total, 12 parish priests have served over the years; Fr. Luis Esquinas Pajuelo has served for the longest period, from 2006 to the present. Former parish priests, Fr. Canisius and, Fr. Robert D'Silva are stationed in the parish as well, to assist the parish priest with the increasing responsibilities.

1. 1957 - 1959 Rev Fr. Floregius Rypma OFM
2. 1959 - 1961 Rev. Fr. Timothy Carney OP
3. 1961 - 1967 Rev. Fr. Daniel McCaffrey OP
4. 1967 - 1974 Rev. Fr. Kieran Smith OP
5. 1974 - 1978 Rev. Fr. Finbar Carroll OP
6. 1978 - 1982 Rev. Fr. Xavier P Hennessy OP
7. 1982 - 1990 Rev. Fr. Canisius Mascarenhas
8. 1990 - 1995 Rev. Fr. Melito Dias
9. 1995 - 2001 Rev. Fr. Robert D'Silva
10. 2001 - 2002 Rev Fr. Tony D'Cruz
11. 2002 - 2006 Rev. Fr. Archie D'Souza
12. 2006 - 2021 Rev. Fr. Luis Esquinas Pajuelo
13. 2021 - To date Rev. Fr. Joshua Joseph Rangel

== Groups of the Parish ==
There are several groups and ministries which help parishioners get engaged in the events of the parish.

=== Dominic Savio Choir ===
The Dominic Savio Choir/Club in 2010 was headed by Alan Goveas. There are about 20 members in the choir, the majority of whom are school children. The 9.00 am masses on Sundays are reserved for the Dominic Savio Choir. Apart from this, they sing for weddings and funerals.

The Dominic Savio Choir encourages and coordinates the participation of the faithful by singing common hymns which the congregation are well versed with. They also sing at big hotels during the Christmas season or at the Pakistan American Cultural Center (PACC). The choir raises funds by calling for donations, through secret collection amongst members, Christmas bazaars, and concerts, to cover their expenses such as transport and printing of hymn books.

=== The Legion of Mary - Senior Presidium ===
The Legion of Mary is a lay Catholic apostolic organization founded in Ireland by a layman, Frank Duff, in 1921. The purpose of the organization is personal sanctification through active apostolic work. It has spread throughout the world and is very active in Africa, Asia, Australia and the USA. Each parish group is called a Praesidium and is composed of a president, vice president, treasurer, secretary and remaining members. The group is usually involved in house visitations, hospital visitations and visits to institutions. Members of the group are active during Advent and Lenten seasons when they contact neighborhood churches in the different areas of the parish.

=== The Fatima Senior Choir ===
The Fatima Senior Choir ensures that Mass each Sunday evening is complemented by hymns that enhance the spiritual element of worship during the Eucharistic Celebration. In addition to Sunday's, it has been a long-standing custom for the choir to lead the midnight services for Christmas, New Year, and Easter each year. The choir also participates in parish events, such as concerts, fairs, outings and dances, oriented towards encouraging an air of communal oneness within the parish.

=== Society Of Vincent De Paul ===
The Society of Vincent De Paul is composed of a Council General - Paris, National Council - Pakistan, Regional Council - Karachi, and Conference at the parish level. There are eight members in the Our Lady of Fatima Conference who continue until they leave or die. The conference holds meetings weekly and engages in home visitations, distribution of rations, medical aid, school fees, food projects, and Christmas hampers and pecuniary aid. Their fund-raising programs include secret collections at meetings, box collection placed in the church, junk sales, sale of food, donations from benefactors, and legacy gifts.

== Parish Ministries ==
=== Eucharistic Ministers ===
The Eucharistic Ministers are composed of lay members of the parish. They are usually involved in distributing and administering the Holy Eucharist at mass and to the sick.

=== Altar Boys ===
There are twelve altar boys who serve from the time they receive Holy Communion right up to adulthood.

=== The Lectors Group ===
There are about 25 members in the Lectors Group, the majority being female. Anyone over the age of thirteen is eligible to join the group. The members of the group take turns doing reading based on a monthly roster.

=== The Neocatechumenal Way or Neocatechumenate ===
The Neocatechumenate is a ministry dedicated to adult faith formation within the Roman Catholic Church, established following the Second Vatican Council. It is dedicated to "a post-baptismal catechesis in the form of the catechumenate", i.e. a process similar to the ritual preparation for baptism in the early Christian church. It was initiated by the Spanish painter, Francisco (Kiko) Argüello, in the early 1960s.

=== Parish Council/Social Committee ===
The Parish Pastoral Council serves as a means of communication between the clergy and laity of the parish. The council identifies the needs of the parish and acts upon them. It encourages involvement of the parishioners in all phases of parish work.

The council functions according to the spirit of Vatican II and according to the guidelines of the Pastoral Directives of the Archdiocese of Karachi.

=== Security and Ushers ===
The security and ushers group provide assistance in a number of situations. Whenever there are festivals, functions, or heavy attendance at mass on special days, the security members are active at the gate and in the compound to ensure that peace prevails throughout such events. They help seat the parishioners, and provide for extra seating. They also ensure that people proceed in an orderly fashion to receive the Eucharist.

=== Archdiocesan Redemptoris Mater Missionary Seminary ===
In 1991, the Intercongregational Commission set up by Pope John Paul II, proposed a new plan to deal with the scarcity of priests around the world. That plan was applied on the Redemptoris Mater Missionary Seminaries which prepare presbyters for the New Evangelisation, in accordance with the Neocatechumenal Way.

== Famous parishioners ==
- The Soares brothers, formed a leading band Rhythm Quintet
- Wallis Mathias, Pakistani test cricketer
- Michael Rodrigues (table tennis), five-time national table tennis champion of Pakistan
- Prof Leo D'Souza, principal of D. J. Science College, Karachi
- Colin Saldanha, Pakistani-Canadian family physician
- Roland deSouza, Professional Engineer, human rights advocate, and environmentalist
- Joseph Allan Goveas, musician and teacher
