= Deirdre Purcell =

Irish author (1945–2023)

Deirdre Purcell (1945 – 13 February 2023) was an Irish author, actress, and journalist.

== Early life and career ==
Deirdre Purcell was born in 1945 in Dublin, where she was also raised. She was educated at Gortnor Abbey in County Mayo.

An Abbey Theatre actress, she played as Christine opposite Donal McCann in Drama at Inish, Miss Frost in the stage adaptation of The Ginger Man, and Pegeen Mike in The Playboy of the Western World. Purcell was also a television and press journalist.

Purcell published twelve critically acclaimed novels, including "Pearl and The Winter Gathering", all of which have been bestsellers in Ireland. She was appointed to the board of the Central Bank of Ireland in 2003 and was serving in 2008 when the Irish banking system collapsed.

From October 2009, she presented All About the Music on RTÉ Lyric FM. She was also a presenter of "It Says in the Papers" on Morning Ireland on RTÉ Radio 1.

Purcell was awarded The Benson & Hedges and Cross awards for journalism.

== Personal life and death ==
Purcell lived in Beara Peninsula in West Cork with her husband, and had two sons including Irish Independent journalist Adrian Weckler. She died on 13 February 2023, at the age of 77.

== Selected works ==
=== Novels ===
- A place of stones. Donnybrook, Dublin: Town House Dublin. 1991. ISBN 9780948524264. OCLC 1280828554.
- That childhood country. Dublin: Townhouse. 1992. ISBN 0-948524-43-X. OCLC 29257667.
- Falling for a Dancer. Dublin: Town House in association with Pan Macmillan. 2003. ISBN 9781860591945. OCLC 1280834659.
- Ashes of roses. New York: Signet. 1994. ISBN 0-451-18246-4. OCLC 31509148.
- Francey. London: Macmillan. 1994. ISBN 0-333-58319-1. OCLC 31604991.
- Roses after rain. New York: Signet. 1996. ISBN 0-451-18630-3. OCLC 34659318.
- Sky. London: Macmillan. 1996. ISBN 0-333-63233-8. OCLC 34474675.
- Love like hate adore. Dublin: Town House. 1998. ISBN 1-86059-075-6. OCLC 39001496.
- Jesus and Billy are off to Barcelona. Dublin: New Island. 1999. ISBN 1-902602-16-1. OCLC 44260691.
- Entertaining Ambrose. London: Macmillan. 2001. ISBN 0-333-71823-2. OCLC 42699956.
- Has anyone here seen larry?. Dublin: New Island. 2002. ISBN 1-902602-70-6. OCLC 49944735.
- Marble gardens. Dublin: New Island. 2002. ISBN 1-902602-56-0. OCLC 48931194.
- Last summer in Arcadia. London: Headline. 2004. ISBN 0-7472-6793-6. OCLC 56466239.
- Children of Eve. Dublin, Ireland: Hodder Headline Ireland. 2005. ISBN 0-7553-2621-0. OCLC 57493509.
- Tell me your secret. Dublin: Hodder Headline Ireland. 2006. ISBN 9780755328987. OCLC 1245807659.
- The secret (2006)
- Somewhere in Between (2007)
- Days We Remember (2008)
- Pearl. London: Headline Review. 2011. ISBN 978-0-7553-3227-4. OCLC 701113305.
- Winter gathering. [Place of publication not identified]: Headline Review. 2014. ISBN 978-0-7553-3230-4. OCLC 869343696.
- Purcell, Deirdre (2017). The Christmas voyage. Dublin. ISBN 978-1-4447-9949-1. OCLC 1008786657.
- Purcell, Deirdre (2017). The husband. Dublin. ISBN 978-1-4447-9941-5. OCLC 946161263.
- Purcell, Deirdre (2019). Grace in winter. Dublin. ISBN 978-1-4736-9991-5. OCLC 1112368756.

=== Series contributed to ===
- Finbar's Hotel (1999) (with Maeve Binchy, Dermot Bolger, Clare Boylan, Emma Donoghue, Anne Haverty, Kate O'Riordan)
- Ladies' Night at Finbar's Hotel (2000) (with Maeve Binchy, Dermot Bolger, Clare Boylan, Emma Donoghue, Anne Haverty, Kate O'Riordan)

=== Non-fiction ===
- Diamonds and holes in my shoes. Dublin: Hodder Headline Ireland. 2006. ISBN 978-0-340-89845-1. OCLC 150948486.
- Days we remember. Dublin: Hachette Books Ireland. 2008. ISBN 9780340977934. OCLC 1256463133.
- Follow me down to Dublin. Dublin: Hachette Books Ireland. 2009. ISBN 978-0-340-99287-6. OCLC 502305966.
- Purcell, Deirdre (2014). Aengus Finucane : in the heart of concern. Dublin. ISBN 978-1-84840-387-1. OCLC 931534981.
