= Priyanka Gill =

British-Indian entrepreneur and investor

- Born: 2 June 1980 (age 46)
- Education: Columbia Business School; London Business School; Convent of Jesus and Mary, Waverley, Mussoorie; Vidya Devi Jindal School; Lady Shri Ram College for Women; King's College London
- Occupations: Co-founder, Good Glamm Group; CEO, Good Media Co; Founder & CEO, POPxo - Plixxo
- Spouse: Raj Gill
- Website: popxo.com

Priyanka Gill (born 2 June 1980) is an Indian entrepreneur and angel investor currently based in London, UK. She is the founder and CEO of POPxo, a digital community platform for millennial women launched in 2014 and merged with MyGlamm in 2020. She currently serves as the co-founder of the Good Glamm Group and CEO of the Good Media Co. In 2019 Gill was named onto Businessworld 40 Under 40 List.

== Early life and education ==
Priyanka was born on 2 June 1980 and grew up in a small of Punjab, India. She completed her schooling from Convent of Jesus and Mary, Waverley, Mussoorie, Vidya Devi Jindal School, Hisar and attended Lady Shri Ram College, New Delhi, where she studied English Literature. Priyanka graduated from Columbia Business School and London Business School's Global MBA programme in 2023.

== Career ==
In 2012, she started a fashion blog called eStylista. This went on to become a content platform by the same name (2013). A year later, the platform was renamed to POPxo.

In November 2014, Gill raised ₹3 crore for POPxo in pre-Series A funding, led by Rajan Anandan and Mithun Sacheti. The company raised an additional $2 million in Series A funding round from IDG Ventures, Kalaari Capital, and 500 startups.

In the year 2017 POPxo raised $3.1 million and $5.5 million in a round of funding led South Korea's Neoplux and Chinese mobile company OPPO with participation from existing investors.

In the same year, POPxo was named in the Unilever Foundry30 Southeast Asia and Australasia, a list of 30 most ambitious startups and scale-ups in the region.

In August 2020 POPxo merged with MyGlamm, a beauty and makeup products brand founded in 2017 and run by Sanghvi Beauty and Technologies Pvt Ltd. Gill later was designated as the co-founder of the joint entity.

After the formation of Good Glamm Group in September 2021, Priyanka rose to the position of the Co-founder of Good Glamm Group.

She heads the Good Media Co. division of the company that comprises POPxo, ScoopWhoop, MissMalini and BabyChakra.

As a journalist, she has contributed to several international publications, including The Independent and Travel + Leisure, and has written for Indian lifestyle magazine Hi! BLITZ.

Gill was a contributing editor for Harpers Bazaar India, guest blogger for Grazia, India editor and contributing fashion editor for UK-based Bond Magazine and Epicurean Life, and also writes for publications, such as The Guardian, Vogue India and Hello Pakistan.

Gill was invited for a panel discussion with Textile Minister Smriti Irani, Faye D’Souza, Sairee Chahal, Ananya Birla, and Flavia Agnes on Create, nurture and transform: the better half at the ETGBS 2019. She was also part of a discussion titled What Business Leaders Need to Know? organized by Businessworld on 24 October 2019. She also appeared on Hindustan Times’ show Brand Leadership hosted by HT Brand Studio.

In 2017 Gill started a social media influencer management company known as Plixxo, that connects influencers with brands to create content.

Gill invests in lifestyle brands and early-stage technology start-ups. She is an investor in Bea's of Bloomsbury, a chain of cake shops in London, Yeildify, Campanja, SoundOut, and Raptor Supplies.

Gill is a board member of TiE, a global non commercial organization focused on fostering entrepreneurship. She also serves as a board member for CXXO, an initiative by Kalaari Capital.

In 2023, Priyanka launched the podcast Dream Build Scale on Spotify. The podcast featured guests like Divya Gokulnath, co-founder and director of Byju's; Deep Bajaj, co-founder and CEO of Sirona; and Bollywood singer Kanika Kapoor, Aanam Chashmawala, Riaan George, and Sumaya Dalmia.

In May 2023, she spoke at various international conferences and events, including the 2023 Global Beauty Conference. As the CEO of Good Media Co, she was invited to speak at the Goafest conference, an Indian advertising festival hosted by AAAI and TAC.

== Art collector ==
Gill is a collector and investor in modern Indian art. In 2009, she bought Tyeb Mehta’s Mahisasura for US$1.2 million at a Christie's auction in New York. This work was sold at Christies inaugural Indian sale in Mumbai in December 2013 for US$3.2 million. Gill supports Indian art by hosting art soirees and receptions.

== Personal life ==
Priyanka is married to Raj Gill, an independent trader based in London. The couple is ranked as number 33 in list of Asian Power Couples Hot 100 presented by Red Hot Curry.

== Awards and recognition ==
- 2018: Nominated for The Economic Times Startup Awards 2018
- 2018: Young Woman Entrepreneur of the year at Conclave and Awards 2018
- 2019: BW 40 Under 40, Businessworld
- 2020: 100 Technology Leaders, Impact
- 2023: Featured among The Most Influential Women In Startup World

== See also ==
- List of Indian journalists
