= Margaret Heneghan =

Irish barrister, judge 2010–2017

Judge of the High Court
- In office 10 February 2015 – 2 October 2017
- Nominated by: Government of Ireland
- Appointed by: Michael D. Higgins

Judge of the Circuit Court
- In office 22 January 2010 – 10 February 2015
- Nominated by: Government of Ireland
- Appointed by: Mary McAleese

Personal details
- Born: 1959 (age 66–67)
- Spouse: Austin Power
- Education: University College Dublin; King's Inns

Margaret Heneghan (born 1959) is a retired Irish judge who served as a Judge of the High Court from 2015 to 2017 and a Judge of the Circuit Court from 2010 to 2015.

== Early and personal life ==
Heneghan was born in 1959. She attended the Gortnor Abbey school in County Mayo and was educated at the King's Inns. She is married to businessman Austin Power.

She was a founding member of the Mayo Association of Dublin.

== Legal career ==
She qualified as a barrister in 1993 and became a senior counsel in 2009. She acted in cases involving family law, personal injuries and repossessions. In 1997, she acted in repossession proceedings against Adele King.

She was appointed to the panel of the Commission for Communications Regulation in 2004. She served on the Legal Aid Board between 2009 and 2010.

== Judicial career ==
=== Circuit Court ===
Heneghan was appointed to the Circuit Court in January 2010. In April 2011, she was assigned to the Dublin circuit where she primarily presided over criminal trials. She also sat on three judge panels of the Special Criminal Court, including the trial of John Dundon for the murder of Shane Geoghegan.

In 2011, she presided over a defamation case taken by Michael Lowry against journalist Sam Smyth.

=== High Court ===
She moved from the Circuit Court to the High Court in February 2015. She continued to hear criminal trials, including cases involving murder and sexual offences.

She retired early as judge, two years after being appointed to the High Court. Her final day as a judge was in October 2017.
