= André Coindre =

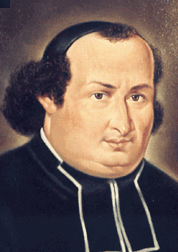
André Coindre

André Coindre (26 February 1787 – 30 May 1826) was a French Catholic priest who founded the Brothers of the Sacred Heart.

== Life ==
Coindre was born in Lyon, France in 1787. He attended the École centrale de Lyon and then the minor seminary. From 1809 to 1812 he studied at the Grand Séminaire on the Place Croix-Paquet. Some of his fellow students included Marcellin Champagnat, Jean-Marie Vianney and Jean-Claude Colin.

In 1812, Coindre was ordained at the Lyon Cathedral by Joseph Fesch, Cardinal, Archbishop of Lyon. His superiors recognized that he had a talent for preaching, so he spent his first six months at the seminary improving his skills. His first assignment was as vicar of Bourg-en-Bresse. In 1815, the vicar of the archdiocese invited Coindre to join a group of priests who traveled among the parishes giving missions. His size and demeanor, as well as his fiery rhetoric, helped convert and inspire a range of people from prisoners to wealthy benefactors. He was also named vicar of the Church of Saint-Bruno des Chartreux in Lyon.

In 1815, he worked with Claudine Thévenet to establish the Association of the Sacred Heart, which three years later became the congregation of the Religious of Jesus and Mary.

As a chaplain in the prisons of Lyon, Father André realized that the young detainees had little hope upon release to help them avoid delinquency. His mission became the moral, intellectual, and religious development of young orphan boys left in distress by the consequent disintegration of family life in the wake of the Revolution. By 1819, Coindre set up an orphanage and trade school near Lyon for homeless boys, and a haven in which young offenders were provided vocational training and Christian formation.

On 30 September 1821 ten men met Coindre at the chapel of the Shrine of Notre-Dame de Fourvière and made private vows in the chapel there, thus founding the Fratres a Sacratissimo Corde Iesu (Brothers of the Sacred Heart), a Roman Catholic religious community primarily devoted to the education of youth. The brothers worked in Lyon and in rural villages where illiteracy was rampant.

He died in Blois, France. An ill Coindre fell from a window to his death. Following André's death, his brother, François Coindre, replaced André as the head of Brothers of the Sacred Heart.

== Legacy ==
The Brothers of the Sacred Heart named a boarding school Coindre Hall in honor of the order's founder. The school operated in Huntington, New York, from 1939 to 1971. They also operate Brother Martin High School in New Orleans. Founded in 1854, Saint Stanislaus is a Catholic, all-boys boarding and day school serving young men in grades 7 through 12.

In 1894, the Brothers of the Sacred Heart founded St. Vincent's Academy in Baton Rouge, Louisiana. The school changed its name to Catholic High School in 1928. Catholic High School has been awarded the National Blue Ribbon of Excellence six times, the most of any school in the nation, and is considered an elite, college preparatory institution.

In 1955, the Brothers of the Sacred Heart took over the running of St Columba's College in St Albans in England.
