= Dina Bélanger =

Canadian musician, nun and mystic

Blessed Marie of Saint Cecilia of Rome R.J.M.
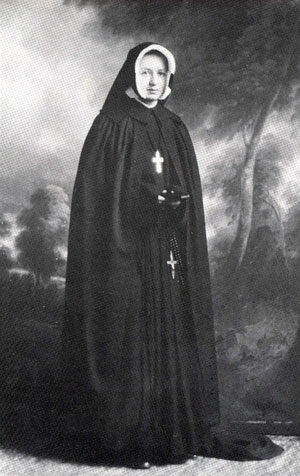

Religious
- Born: 30 April 1897; Québec, Canada
- Died: 4 September 1929 (aged 32); Sillery, Québec, Canada
- Venerated in: Roman Catholic Church
- Beatified: 20 March 1993, Saint Peter's Square, Vatican City by Pope John Paul II
- Feast: 4 September
- Attributes: Religious habit
- Patronage: Musicians

Dina Bélanger, RJM (30 April 1897 – 4 September 1929), known in religion as Marie of Saint Cecilia of Rome, was a Canadian member of the Religious of Jesus and Mary.

Bélanger was a noted musician. She learned the piano in late childhood, and moreover taught the instrument later in life. Though successive bouts of poor health—and in particular, of tuberculosis—weakened her, her spiritual and musical aspirations remained forceful. An autobiographical account spanning from 1924 until just months prior to her death details her spiritual encounters with Jesus Christ, which took place throughout a series of visions. Her beatification was celebrated on 20 March 1993.

== Biography ==
Dina Bélanger was born on 30 April 1897 in Québec (in the Saint-Roch parish) to Olivier Octave Bélanger (April 21, 1871 – July 21, 1952) and Séraphia Matte (April 18, 1870 – August 18, 1951). Her baptism was celebrated just hours later; she was given the names "Marie-Marguerite-Dina-Adélaïde", the last in honor of her paternal grandmother. Her brother, Joseph-Simeon-Gustave, was born seventeen months after her, but died at just three months of age.

Her mother instilled in her deep and long-lasting religious principles. The girl loved the Angelus, but did not understand Latin save for the Amen at the end. Upon hearing the ring of the bell announcing the beginning of the Angelus, she would run upstairs for it. In her childhood, her mother took her to Mass, to novenas, and to sermons. She found the latter boring, and so once brought along the stoneware doll she named Valeda. Her mother disliked this practice, and asked that it be left alone. When Dina used it nonetheless, her mother put it in her purse. Bélanger had a mischievous side and also a temper. In 1901 she threw a tantrum. Then her father arose from the table and joined in. She stopped upon seeing her father do that; she was mortified and never threw tantrums again.

In 1903 she began her studies at the convent-school of Saint Roch. She made her First Communion on 2 May 1907 as well as her Confirmation. In 1909 she left that school to continue her studies at Notre-Dame de Jacques-Cartier. However, in 1911 she received parental permission to enter the Bellevue convent boarding school and entered in the fall of 1911. But she became homesick and cried on one occasion; her parents offered to take her home but she refused and said she would get over it in due time. On 6 October 1911, she and some friends visited the Blessed Sacrament and it prompted her to make a private act of consecration to God. From 1913 to 1916 she lived with her parents at home after completing her education. She drew up a rule of life for herself and made it a practice to examine her conscience each night.

In 1913 she asked her parents and two priests (one being her spiritual director) if she could enter the Notre-Dame order's novitiate. The priests told her to wait. Her father later recalled that she was hurt but was at peace with their decision. Her piano studies led to a superior class certificate and a laureate before she attained a teaching diploma. She had been studying piano since 1914 with Joseph-Arthur Bernier who was the organist for the parish of Notre-Dame de Jacques-Cartier. He mentioned her piano studies to the parish priest Omer Cloutier who advised her parents to enroll her at the Institute of Musical Art in the United States of America. But she was learning music from the nuns since she was eight up until 1914.

She was sent to learn music in New York her parents were worried about her welfare there but she did her best to reassure them. She left home in October 1916 with her father as well as her friends Bernadette Letourneau and Aline Marquis (both became nuns themselves) who were also to go there for their studies. In New York, Dina lived with the Religious of Jesus and Mary at a unique residence for young women called Our Lady of Peace. The residence provided safety and community for young women who came to New York from all over the world for work or school. Our Lady of Peace was particularly welcoming to young women who came to New York from Catholic locales, the RJM offered a community that was imbued with Catholic culture mixed with the international group of sisters' motherly care, which helped Dina get over her homesickness. She returned home to Canada after her graduation in June 1918, where she performed public concerts between 1918 and 1921;

Dina became a Third Order Dominican. After a year of probation, she made her profession, and took the name of St. Catherine of Siena. This name was granted her only after she said that her birthday was on the Feast day of St. Catherine (April 30 on the 'Traditional' Roman Calendar-now April 29 on the Modern Roman Calendar).

Bélanger entered the Religieuses de Jésus-Marie on 11 August 1921 where she assumed the religious name of "Marie de Sainte-Cécile de Rome"; she made her vows on 15 August 1923. She entered with the approval of her parents who took her to Niagara Falls in June 1921 before she entered though her parents relocated to be closer to their daughter. During her first mission in Saint-Michel-de-Bellechasse where she taught the piano (which started in August 1923) she contracted scarlet fever after treating a student but recovered enough on 7 December 1923 to resume her teaching duties in January 1924. But this fever soon degenerated into tuberculosis and she later wrote that the illness allowed her to further deepen her union with Jesus Christ and on 2 April 1924 she was taken ill again. From February 1924 to 29 July 1929 - at the behest of her superior - she began writing a biographical account with the first part completed that first June. Jesus said to her in a vision well before this: "You will do good by your writings".

At the beginning of 1927 she fell ill and was taken to the medical ward though later had enough strength for her perpetual profession on 15 August 1928. On 29 April 1929 she was moved to the tuberculosis isolation ward for good and on 3 September 1929 her parents spent a few minutes with her in which her father wept and her mother gave her drops of water to quench her thirst though the pain of her parents made her suffer.

Bélanger died on 4 September 1929. Her remains were buried on 7 September though exhumed in 1951 and again in May 1990.

The Salle Dina-Bélanger and the Québec Music Festival Dina Bélanger and the Collège Dina Bélanger in Saint-Michel-de-Bellechasse are named in her honor. A musical based on her life was presented as part of the fourth centennial of Québec and the 49th International Eucharistic Congress held there in June 2008. The singer-songwriter Martin Louis Lanthier created the production and Bruno Marquis performed the staging.

== Beatification ==
The beatification cause opened in Québec in which the informative process was held from 11 May 1950 until 2 May 1956 with the late Bélanger's parents offering testimonies for the beatification process; the theologians approved her journal entries and other spiritual writings as being in line with the faith on 8 July 1965 while a supplementary process was held from 20 September 1963 to 6 September 1967. An apostolic process would have been held as was the norm at the time but this was dispensed. The Congregation for the Causes of Saints validated the previous processes in Rome on 30 January 1987 and received the Positio dossier from the C.C.S. in 1987. Theologians approved the dossier on 25 October 1988 as did the C.C.S. on 2 May 1989. The confirmation of her heroic virtue allowed for Pope John Paul II to title her as Venerable on 13 May 1989.

The miracle that led to her beatification was the cure of the infant Jules Chiasson of New Brunswick from hydrocephalus in 1939. It was investigated on a diocesan level before it received C.C.S. approval on 14 March 1987; medical experts approved it on 15 November 1989 as did theologians on 23 March 1990 and the C.C.S. on 19 June 1990. John Paul II approved this healing to be a miracle on 10 July 1990 and beatified Bélanger on 20 March 1993 in Saint Peter's Square.

== Quotes ==
- Notre Seigneur, Homme-Dieu, me fit voir son Cœur adorable, dans l’Hostie sainte. Son Cœur et l’Hostie étaient parfaitement unis, tellement l’un dans l’autre que je ne puis pas expliquer comment il m’était possible de les distinguer l’un de l’autre. De l’Hostie émanait une immensité de rayons de lumière. De son Cœur jaillissait une immensité de flammes, lesquelles s’échappaient comme en torrents pressés. La très sainte Vierge était là, si près de Notre Seigneur qu’elle était comme absorbée par Lui, et pourtant, je la voyais distinctement de Lui… Toutes les lumières de l’Hostie et toutes les flammes du Cœur de Jésus passaient par le Cœur immaculé de la très sainte Vierge.
  Our Lord of Lords, God-man, showed me his adorable Heart in the Sacramental bread. His Heart and the {Eucharistic} Host were perfectly united, so much one in the other that I cannot explain how it was possible for me to distinguish one from the other. From the Sacramental bread {of the Eucharist] emanated an immensity of rays of light. From [Jesus'] Heart sprang an immensity of flames, which escaped as if in rushing torrents. The most Holy Virgin was there, so close to Our Lord that she was as if absorbed by Him, and yet I could see her distinctly from Him... All the lights of the [Eucharistic] Host and all the flames of the Heart of Jesus passed through the Immaculate Heart of Holy Virgin.
- Depuis quelques semaines, Notre-Seigneur se plaît à m’appeler : “ ma petite Moi-même ”.
  For several weeks, Our Lord has liked to call me: “ my little Myself ”
