= John Berchmans Conway =

Irish Catholic religious sister and educator (1929–2022)

SQA John Berchmans Conway

Personal life
- Born: 1929 County Clare, Ireland
- Died: 21 December 2022 (aged 93)
- Occupation: Religious sister and educator
- Honours: Sitara-e-Quaid-i-Azam

Religious life
- Religion: Roman Catholic
- Order: Religious of Jesus and Mary

John Berchmans Conway, R.J.M. (born Bernadette Conway; 1929 – 21 December 2022), usually known as Sister Berchmans, was an Irish Roman Catholic religious sister and teacher who worked in Pakistan for 60 years. In 2012 she was decorated by the Government of Pakistan for her services in education and promoting interfaith harmony.

== Early life ==
Conway was born as Bernadette Conway in County Clare, Ireland. In 1951 she joined the Congregation of the Religious of Jesus and Mary, founded by Claudine Thevenet in France in 1818, dedicated to caring for and educating the young and homeless. Very early, the congregation took on the task of education in other countries. The first Convent of Jesus and Mary in Pakistan was opened by four sisters in Lahore in 1876. She was sent to Pakistan in 1953 at the age of 24.

== Work in Pakistan ==
Conway spent some 60 years teaching English and mathematics. She taught girls in Jesus and Mary Convents in Lahore, Murree and Karachi. She completed her Diamond Jubilee, or 60th year, of religious profession in the Religious of Jesus and Mary in December 2011. Her notable students included Benazir Bhutto, the late Prime Minister of Pakistan, who was assassinated in 2007, and Asma Jahangir, a noted human rights activist.

== Personal life and death ==
Conway died on 21 December 2022, at the age of 93.

== Awards and recognition ==
On 15 February 2012, the President of Pakistan approved conferment of the Sitara (Urdu: Star) class of the Nishan-e-Quaid-i-Azam award on Conway for her services in education and promoting interfaith harmony in Pakistan.

On 25 March 2012, more than 600 people gathered at St. Anthony’s Church for a special Mass to celebrate the conferral of the country’s highest civilian award on Conway and the Rev. Robert McCulloch, S.S.C.

In July 2019, St Mary's University, Twickenham awarded Sister Berchmans Conway the Benedict Medal in recognition of almost 70 years of teaching.

In 2020, a road in Clifton was named in her honour. The Berchmans Road was dedicated to her in recognition for her services to education.

== See also ==
- John Berchmans
