= Coindre Hall =

Historic house in New York, United States

- George McKesson Brown Estate -- Coindre Hall
- U.S. National Register of Historic Places
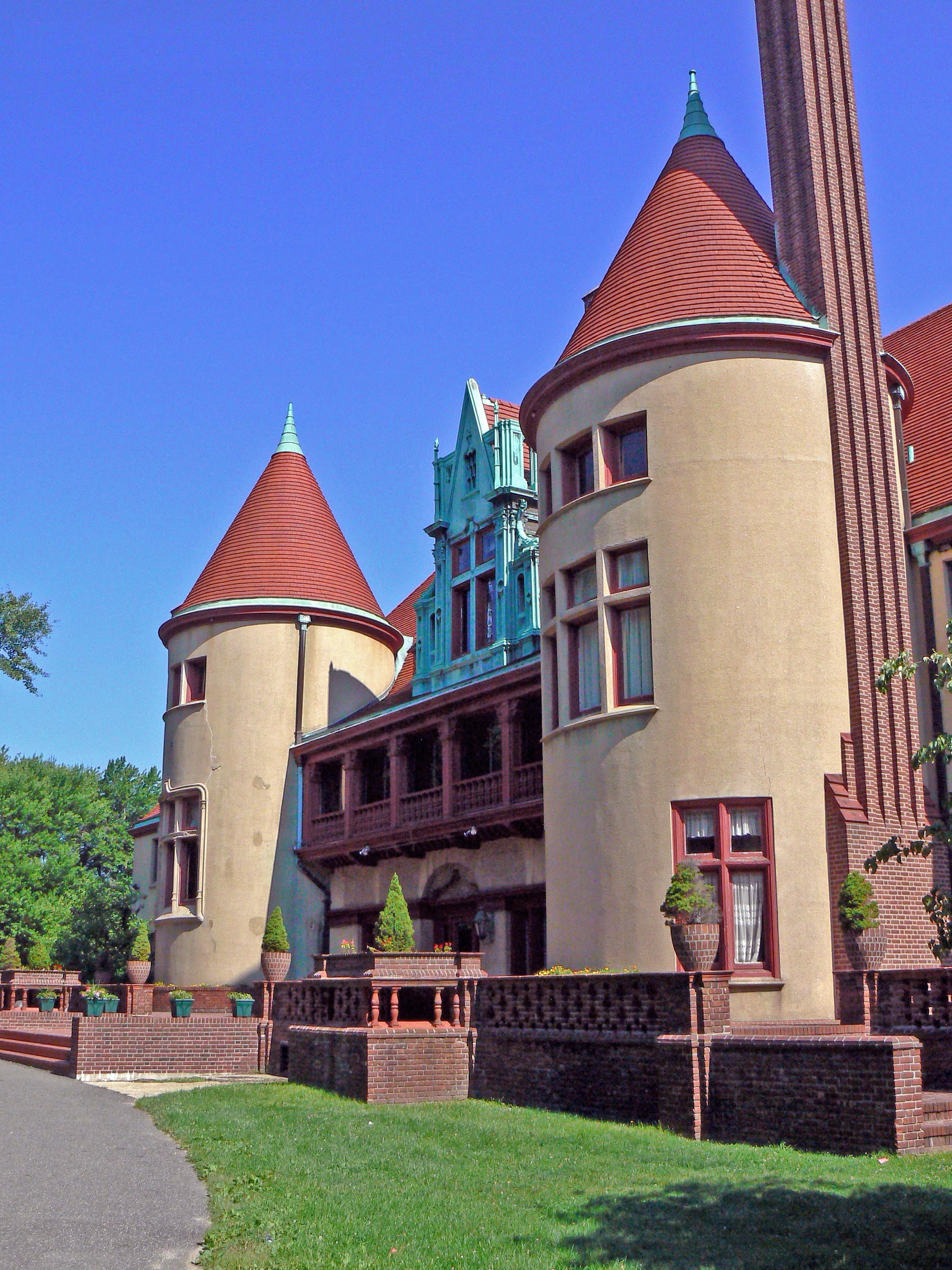
- Coindre Hall

- Location within New York Location within the United States
- Location: 101 Browns Road, Huntington, New York, US
- Coordinates: 40°53′41″N 73°26′13″W
- Area: 33 acres (13 ha)
- Built: 1910
- Architect: Clarence Sumner Luce and J.V. Schafer.
- Architectural style: Renaissance, French Chateauesque
- MPS: Huntington Town MRA
- NRHP reference No.: 85002493
- Added to NRHP: September 26, 1985

Coindre Hall, originally called West Neck Farm, is a 40-room, 80,000-square-foot (7,400 m^{2}) mansion in the style of a medieval French château completed in 1912 for pharmaceutical magnate George McKesson Brown. Coindre Hall sits on 33 acres (13 ha) of rolling land overlooking Huntington Harbor, near the Long Island Sound.

On the property there is also a boathouse, greenhouse, pump house, and other auxiliary sheds in building all in varying states of disrepair.

== History ==
=== George McKesson Brown ===
The house was designed by New York architect Clarence Sumner Luce and completed in 1912 for George McKesson Brown of the McKesson pharmaceutical family. Brown, a Huntington Fire Commissioner for 29 years before his retirement in 1960, was the elder half-brother of race car driver David Bruce-Brown. In 1930, Brown donated a private road to the Town of Huntington, named Browns Road in his honor. Brown sold the house in 1939. (He died at Huntington on October 3, 1964, age 86 years.)

=== Brothers of the Sacred Heart ===
In 1939, at the request of Bishop Monsignor Thomas Edmund Molloy, the Brothers of the Sacred Heart (active in Christian education since 1847) bought the property, intending to establish a boarding school and summer retreat. It was founded by Brother Martinian, S.C., Provincial Superior and named in memory of Father André Coindre, the founder of the order. The school was intended to generate funds for the formation and education of young members of the order. It closed on June 30, 1971, due to a lack of teachers. At the time of its closing there were 116 students.

=== Suffolk County Ownership ===
The Suffolk County Legislature voted to purchase Coindre Hall for $750,000 in July 1972 and spent $4,000 to map the area. The plan was to use it as a harborfront park and lease the manor to the Town of Huntington to be used as a cultural center.

At the end of 1976, Suffolk County decided to close Coindre Hall due to budget cutbacks. It was costing the county about $90,000 to keep it open. Since the county's purchase of the property it had been used by the Huntington Militia, the Suffolk County Highway Patrol Bureau and the Huntington Art League.

The property was leased from Suffolk County in 1981 by Eagle Hill School, a private coeducational boarding school for students with learning disabilities. The school signed a 25year lease but run into financial difficulties and broke the lease in 1989. The school had declining enrollment and could not afford the rent or make needed repairs to the building.

=== Today ===
Since 1973, Coindre Hall Park has been administered by the Suffolk County Department of Parks, Recreation & Conservation. Currently there is a gym that hosts soccer and basketball, Coindre Hall Soccer and Splashes of Hope has art studio space upstairs through a work-exchange program with the county.

The mansion is often used for hosting weddings and unique catered events exclusively through Lessing's Hospitality Group. The Town of Huntington Department of Parks & Recreation used Coindre Hall for its adult exercise classes in Fall 2018.

The land around the mansion is used as a dog park and extends all the way down to Huntington Harbor connecting the mansions' property and Gold Star Battalion beach.

On September 26, 1985, it was listed on the National Register of Historic Places and dedicated to the Suffolk County Historic Trust.
