= Convent of Jesus and Mary, Murree =

Private school in Punjab, Pakistan

Convent of Jesus Mary
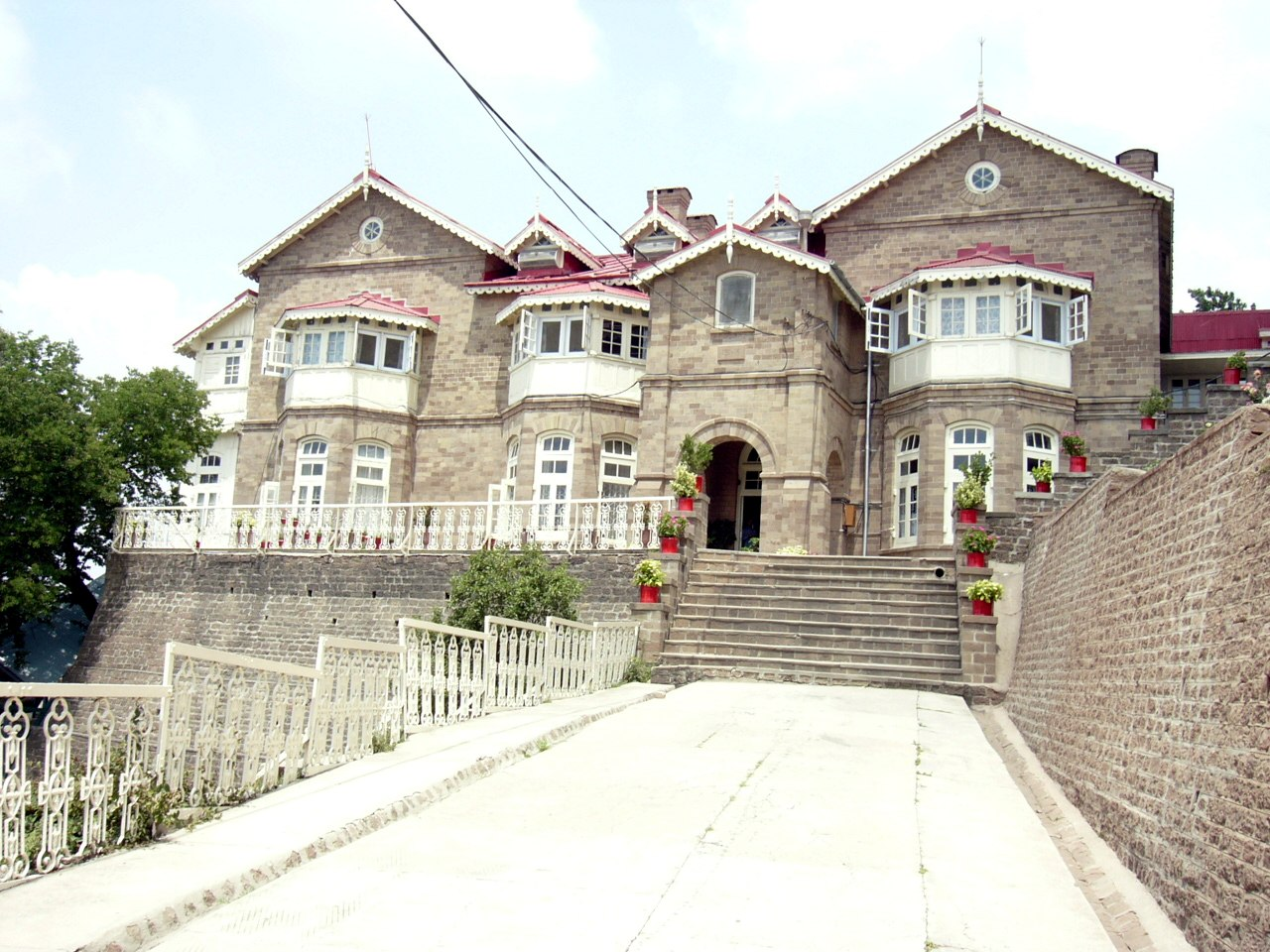

Location
- Murree, Punjab; Pakistan
- Coordinates: 33.8921°N 73.3773°E

Information
- Type: Private primary and secondary school
- Religious affiliation: Catholicism
- Established: 1876; 150 years ago
- Founder: Claudine Thévenet
- Oversight: Catholic Board of Education
- Principal: Sister Mercedes
- Gender: Girls
- Age: 4 to 16
- Enrollment: c. 560

The Convent of Jesus Mary is a private boarding school located in Murree, Pakistan, and was founded in 1876 by Claudine Thévenet, who was also a founder of the Religious Order of Jesus Mary to educate young women of every status.

== History ==
The school operated as a girls-only boarding school from its establishment until 2007.

"We have served students all over the country for 135 years. It is time now to concentrate on the people of Murree. This town has also changed as it has expanded and there are many children today. We had 160 girls in the boarding and right now we have 400 day-scholars. There is no limit on the number of students that will join the school."

— Sister Mercedes, Principal of Convent of Jesus Mary.

On February 15, 2012, the President of Pakistan approved conferment of Sitara Quaid-e-Azam on Sister John Berchmans Conway, a former teacher of the school, for her services towards education and promoting interfaith harmony in Pakistan.

== Notable alumni ==
- Benazir Bhutto Former Prime Minister of Pakistan
- Tehmina Durrani, Pakistani aristocrat and politician. Author of My Feudal Lord
- Syeda Abida Hussain, Former Federal Minister of Pakistan
- Hadiqa Kiyani, Actress and Singer
- Rubina Khanum, Political activist and the older sister of Prime Minister Imran Khan
- Daughters of the Imperial Aga Khan Family
