= Robert D'Silva =

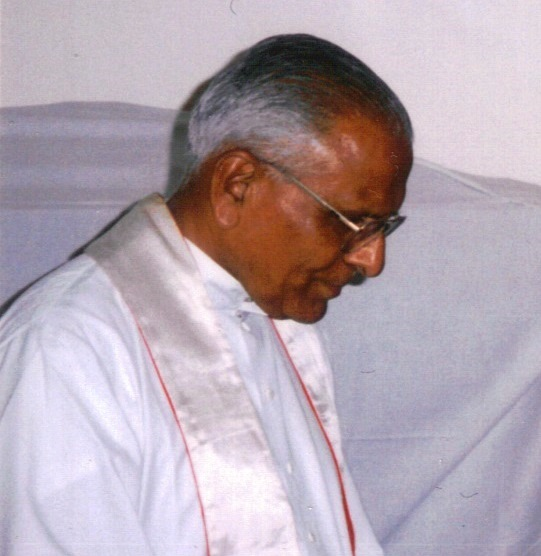
Fr. Robert D'Silva

Robert D'Silva (7 June 1925 – 15 October 2015) was a Pakistani Roman Catholic priest.

== Biography ==
He was born in Karachi, Pakistan. He attended St Patrick's High School, Karachi, where he was a classmate of BJP President L.K. Advani. He studied theology in Shillong from 1944 and was ordained a priest on 24 August 1952.

Since then he has held many appointments including parish priest of Christ the King Church, St. Lawrence's Church and parish priest of St. Patrick’s Parish.

In 1985, D'Silva who was then the parish priest of St. Anthony's Church, built and expanded the St. Anthony's Boys School to become a full-fledged Matriculation school.

In 1994, he lobbied officials to seek permission to build an Old Priests Home on a Civil Lines plot of land owned by the Archdiocese. In 2000 the Old Priests Home was completed. A beautiful Chapel inside fulfilled the spiritual needs of the first residents, Frs. Robert D'Silva, Melito Dias and Joseph D'Mello.

From 1995 to 2001 D'Silva was the parish priest of Fatima Parish.

The Father Robert D'Silva Golden Jubilee Invitation Inter-school cricket tournament was named in his honour in 2002 to celebrate 50 years of his priesthood.

D'Silva has led many pilgrimages to Goa, as well as to the Marian shrine in Fátima, Portugal.

In 2004, he led a group of 300 pilgrims to the Indian state of Goa for the decennial exposition of Saint Francis Xavier's relics in Old Goa. At the time he is once again the parish priest of St. Lawrence's Church in Karachi.

His last posting was as Assistant parish priest of Our Lady of Fatima Parish, Karachi. He died in Karachi on 15 October 2015.
