= Catechetical Centre, Karachi =

The Catechetical Centre, Karachi is the organization responsible for catechesis in the Roman Catholic Archdiocese of Karachi in Pakistan.

== Establishment ==
The Catechetical Centre was established in 1973 with Sr. Katherine Prince FMM as its first director. Fr. Anjou Soares was the director of Karachi's Catechetical Centre till 1992. Emmanuel Neno has been director of the Catechetical Centre from 1992 to 2002.

== Responsibility and usage ==
The Centre is responsible for training catechists. 34 catechists attended a November 11, 2002, training in Karachi organized to introduce the Asian Integral Pastoral Approach (AsIPA), a pastoral process promoted by the Office of Laity of the Federation of Asian Bishops' Conferences.

The Centre also contributes to publications like the rituals [new Urdu-language texts for the Sacraments and rites] in seven volumes, published after a seven-year effort by a team led by Father Robert McCulloch, a Columban missionary, and Emmanuel Neno, director of the Catechetical Centre. The first volumes were published in 2000, following approval from the Vatican.

Young Pakistani Catholics recently completed a five-week Faith Formation course set up in 1993, that helps them discover their religious identity. 32 participants from seven parishes of Karachi archdiocese attended the February 4-March 6, 2002 program at the Centre. Father Arthur Charles, director of the Centre in 2006, proposed plans to launch the first Urdu-language Catholic weekly in Pakistan. The newspaper will be called Agahi and will be based in the Centre’s office.

The Centre also organises programs on liturgical music like the one titled "Proper Use of Music in Worship" on January 27, 2007, at the Holy Family Hospital Auditorium. The event attracted 220 people from 12 parishes.

== Television ==
The Catechetical Center is also home to Good News TV, the Archdiocese internet based TV channel. Part of the center has been converted into a studio.

== Change in leadership ==
Fr. Arthur Charles handed over the Catechetical Centre to Fr. Aamir Ashiq Bhatti in the presence of Joseph Cardinal Coutts on Tuesday, August 28, 2018. He served the Centre over 15 years and 4 months. This is the longest term any director has served. From 2021 Fr. Edward Joseph (Vicar General) served as the director until February 2026, when Fr. Afzal Gulfam took over as the current director. Mr. John Michael has been serving as the accounts officer as well as administrator since 2013.

== Statistics ==
- During the year 2016, more than 570 Catechism Teachers were facilitated in their ongoing education and formation.
- Over 6,116 children received instruction through a programme specially designed for them under the title: I am a child of God.
- 4,804 individuals benefited from courses and seminars.
- 869 individuals participated in the Marriage Preparation Programme.
