= Convent of Jesus and Mary, Sialkot =

Convent of Jesus and Mary

Location
- 128 Haider Road, Sialkot Cantt. Sialkot, Punjab, 51300; Pakistan

Information
- Type: High school
- Motto: "Education is not Information but Formation"
- Religious affiliation: Roman Catholic
- Established: 1856
- Founder: Mother St. Gonzaga Bergonhoux
- Administration: Catholic Board of Education
- Principal: Sister Clara Hussain RJM
- Gender: Girls
- Age: 4 to 16
- Houses: Faith, Unity, Service, Discipline
- Colours: Red and white
- Website: www.cjm-pakistan.com/slkt

The Convent of Jesus and Mary, Sialkot was the first Catholic school in the Punjab and second in British India after Agra. It was established in 1856 by five nuns headed by Mother St. Gonzaga Bergonhoux and was opened at the request of the Archbishop of Agra. It is one of the oldest mission school in Punjab. Its educational system, characterized by a blend of intellectual depth and polished structure, contributed significantly to the broader cultural shifts in the region.

The school is located at 128 Haider Road, Sialkot Cantt 51300.

== History ==
The first Catholic school in Punjab was the Convent of Jesus and Mary, Sialkot, which was opened at the request of the Archbishop of Agra, His Lordship, Msgr. Michael Angelo Jacobi. Msgr. Jacobi seeing the need for a good educational establishment for young girls, informed the Provincial Superioress of the Convent at Agra of his desires and invited her to open a foundation in Sialkot and extend the good works of the Congregation of Jesus and Mary already established in the United Provinces of Oudh and Agra.

In December 1855 five Sisters left Sardanha for Sialkot, via Lahore, accompanied by the good Archbishop himself. Mother St. Gonzaga Bergonhoux was named superior. Accompanying her were Mother St. Chrysostom Gubbins, Mother St. Macaire Dervieux, Mary St. Patrick O’Sullivan and Mary St. Veronica Reghilini. It was a long, wearisome and dangerous journey from Sardanha to Sialkot in those days, but the zeal of the tiny Congregation was not to be daunted by dusty roads and difficult journeys. The bullock-cart had rough wooden wheels and no springs, and it broke down frequently on the bad roads, a route of about 329 miles (529 km). They travelled at night since the midday sun was too hot. Meals were taken at small villages on the way, with rice and milk being the daily food. Eggs were a treat on occasion.

What must have been most dreaded were long stretches of road at night, where forests came to the edge of some roads, and these were infested by wild beasts and even by bandits. But hardships and perils did not affect the valiant group at all. Reaching Lahore was quite an achievement, but there was still another 80 or 90 miles to go. The party of Sisters and the Archbishop finally arrived in Sialkot on February 15, 1856. The first community consisted of 5 nuns and 3 possible postulants. Thus was begun the first Convent of Jesus and Mary in Punjab. The house had no surplus furniture. There was a total absence of anything extra, which might mean ease or comfort. They were really poor. This austerity did not dampen their zeal.

The work progressed well. The children came in slowly, but they did come, and soon the house was full. With joy, all looked forward to a new year when the work would progress even further, but there were growing signs that all was not well. Shadows of an uprising were spreading all over. The first shots were fired on July 9, 1857, and the Sisters went on to suffer the terrors of the Indian Mutiny or the First War of Independence.

In 2019 Sr. Mary Langan (RJM) a former principal celebrated 50 years as a religious sister.
