= Claudine Thévenet =

French saint

Saint Claudine Thévenet RJM
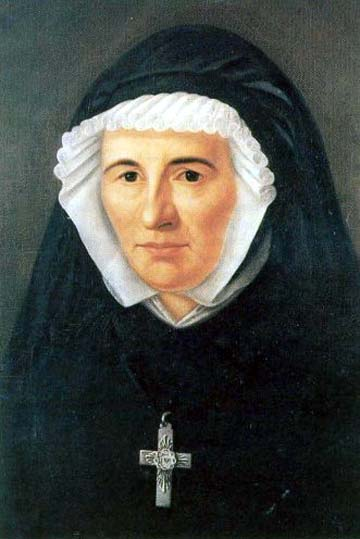

Virgin
- Born: 30 March 1774; Lyon, Rhône, Kingdom of France
- Died: 3 February 1837 (aged 62); Lyon, Rhône, French Kingdom
- Venerated in: Roman Catholic Church
- Beatified: 4 October 1981, Saint Peter's Square by Pope John Paul II
- Canonized: 21 March 1993, Saint Peter's Basilica by Pope John Paul II
- Feast: 3 February
- Patronage: Religious of Jesus and Mary

Claudine Thévenet, RJM (30 March 1774 – 3 February 1837), religious name Marie of Saint Ignatius, was a French Catholic religious sister and the founder of the Religious of Jesus and Mary.

Thévenet witnessed the horrors of the French Revolution – she saw two of her brothers executed – and went on to cater to the needs of children while using her congregation to provide local girls with a religious education.

Thévenet was beatified on 4 October 1981 and was later canonized as a saint on 21 March 1993.

== Life ==
Claudine Thévenet was born in the Kingdom of France, on 30 March 1774, as the second of seven children.

During her adolescence, Thévenet studied at the Saint-Pierre-les-Nonnains convent. The French Revolution saw the destruction of the old government and the formation of a new one that soon led to a violent massacre in her hometown in which two of her brothers were guillotined in public on 5 January 1794. Her brothers died forgiving their killers and the pair beseeched their distraught sister to do the same; their final words to her were: "Forgive them as we forgive".

Not long after this she began to work with working women in her town and soon came into contact with the priest André Coindre. Coindre was vicar of the Church of Saint-Bruno des Chartreux. In 1816, he had established the "Providence of St. Bruno", on the premises of the former Carthusian monastery. This was a charitable institution that sheltered orphans and the children of very poor families and provided room, board, religious instruction, and taught them a trade so that they could earn a living.

Together with Coindre she formed a small group, the "Pious Union", an association for ladies and young women with the aim of working to raise and educate girls. In 1817, Coindre established the “Providence of the Sacred Heart”, which he organized for girls at the Carthusian site. He then entrusted its operation to the members of the Pious Union, which becomes known as the Association of the Sacred Heart. Thévenet was elected president. On one occasion Coindre found two shivering children and brought them to her, thus expanding their work to include caring for destitute children.

On 6 October 1818 the Association became the Religious of Jesus and Mary dedicated to educating girls; the order was founded on the hill of Croix Rousse. Thévenet took a religious name, Mary of St. Ignatius, and began to serve as the order's superior. In 1820, the community relocated to Fourviere.

Her health started to decline in 1835 and she died at the beginning of 1837.

The congregation received diocesan approval in Puy in 1823 and in Lyon in 1825. The order received pontifical approval on 31 December 1847 from Pope Pius IX.

== Sainthood ==
The canonization process commenced in France in an informative process that Cardinal Louis-Joseph Maurin inaugurated on 16 October 1926 and later closed on 7 September 1928. The introduction of the cause came on 20 November 1928 and she became titled as a Servant of God. Historians approved the cause on 6 March 1968 while theologians questioned and approved all of her spiritual writings on 8 January 1970 while confirming them to be orthodox in nature and not in contradiction of official doctrine.

Members of the Congregation for the Causes of Saints and their consultants gathered and approved the cause on 19 July 1977 while the C.C.S. itself approved it on 13 December 1977. She was titled as Venerable on 6 February 1978 after Pope Paul VI approved her life of heroic virtue.

Pope John Paul II beatified Thévenet on 4 October 1981. The miracle needed for sainthood was investigated and then validated in Rome on 15 March 1991 which allowed for a medical board to approve it on 30 January 1992 and theologians to do so as well on 22 May 1992; the C.C.S. did so also on 16 June 1992 allowing for the pope to issue his final approval of her miracle and canonization on 11 July 1992. John Paul II canonized her on 21 March 1993.
