= Tamgha-e-Quaid-e-Azam =

- Country: Pakistan
- Presented by: Government of Pakistan
- Eligibility: Civilians or military personnel
- Post-nominals: NQA, HQA, SQA, TQA
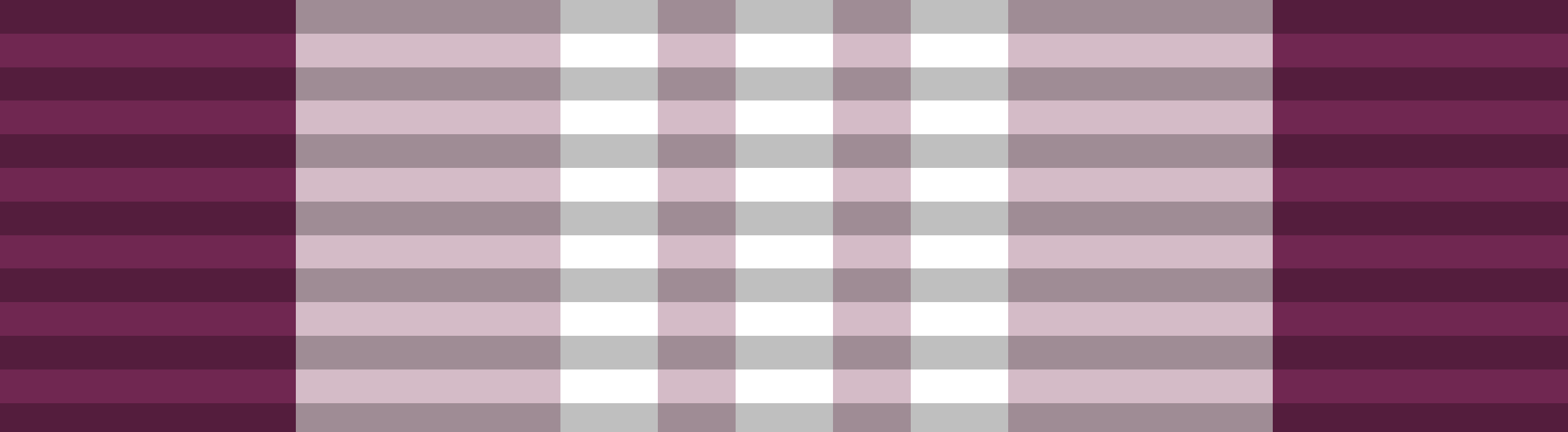
- Ribbon

Tamgha-e-Quaid-e-Azam (Note: Urdu:تمغہِ قائدِ اعظم) (lit. Medal of the Great Leader), is a civil award conferred by the Government of Pakistan on those who have attained academic distinction in the fields of science, art, literature, or distinction in the fields of sports and nursing; or for rendering dedicated services with selfless devotion in human rights and public service.

This award, like other civilian awards, is announced on August 14 each year and its investiture takes place on the following year on 16 February. It is the fifth-highest honour given by the Government of Pakistan to civilians or military personnel.

== Class ==
GRADES
Nishan-e-Quaid-e-Azam (NQA)	Hilal-e-Quaid-e-Azam (HQA)	Sitara-e-Quaid-e-Azam (SQA)	Tamgha-e-Quaid-e-Azam (TQA)

== See also ==
- Civil awards and decorations of Pakistan
