= Religious of Jesus and Mary =

Catholic religious congregation of women

- Congrégation des Religeuses de Jésus-Marie
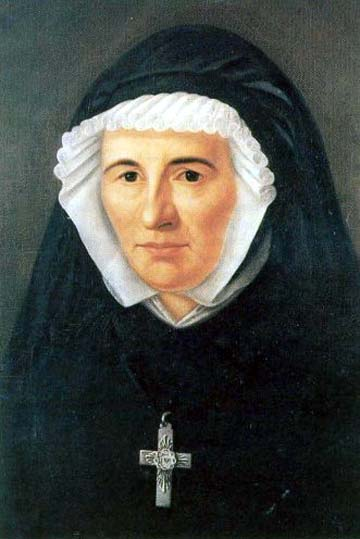
- St. Claudine "Glady" Thévenet (Mother Mary of St. Ignatius), R.J.M.
- Abbreviation: R.J.M.
- Formation: 1818; 208 years ago
- Founder: Claudine Thévenet
- Type: Catholic religious order
- Headquarters: Rome, Italy (Motherhouse: Lyon, France)
- Superior General: Sr. Monica Joseph, R.J.M.
- Main organ: www.rjmgeneral.org/en/
- Website: rjmusa.org

The Religious of Jesus and Mary (French: Religieuses de Jésus-Marie), abbreviated as R.J.M., form a Roman Catholic religious congregation of women dedicated to the education and service of the poor. An institute of consecrated life of pontifical right, the congregation was founded at Lyon, France, in October 1818, by Claudine Thévenet.

== Foundation ==
Thévenet had survived the siege of her native city by the forces of the French Revolution, seeing two of her brothers executed before her eyes in 1794. This inspired a resolve in her to dedicate her life to the relief of the suffering in the world. Some 20 years later, her work came to be guided by a local Catholic priest, the Abbé André Coindre, who was committed to establishing institutions to educate and help the children of the poor in the city. One day he committed to her care two young girls who had been found abandoned near the Church of St-Nizier.

Thévenet then established a small house of refuge called La Providence to care for the children of the city. She was joined in this work by a group of women who formed a society, of which she was elected president. In 1818, Fr. Coindre suggested to Claudine that she should commit herself to the consecrated life under Ignatian spirituality, which call she accepted. With the members of the society she had founded who also wished to follow that path, she established a small convent in the working-class neighborhood of La Croix-Rousse. They soon need to expand and moved to a house in the Fourvière sector of Lyon.

== Growth ==
The congregation received the approval of the Bishop of Le Puy-en-Velay in 1823 and of the Archbishop of Lyon in 1825. Their Constitutions were approved by Pope Pius IX on 31 December 1847. The object of this congregation was to give girls a Christian education conformable to their social position. For this purpose the Sister would have boarding schools and academies.

In France, before the expulsion of 1901, they were at Lyon, and at Le Puy-en-Velay, Rodez, and Remiremont. Owing to the religious persecution in France at that time, the General Motherhouse was transferred to Rome in September 1901.

=== Beyond France ===
In 1842, several Religious of Jesus and Mary travelled from France to India, where 12 communities were established, including ones at Bombay, Poona, Lahore, Simla and Agra (see Convent of Jesus and Mary). In 1850, the first house in Spain was founded at Sant Andreu de Palomar near Barcelona; then followed other foundations, at Valencia, Barcelona, Orihuela, Sant Gervasi, Alicante and Murcia. In 1902, the RJM in Spain sent sisters to found houses in Mexico City and at Mérida, Yucatán.

=== North America ===
The first house of the congregation in the Americas was founded at St-Joseph, Lévis, Quebec, Canada, in 1855. In 1876, Sillery, Quebec, became the Provincial motherhouse for America. Houses in Canada were founded at St-Gervais, St-Michel, Trois-Pistoles, and Beauceville.

By the middle of the 19th century, poor harvests sent many French Canadians to emigrate south to find work in the industrialized towns of the United States. In 1877, several Sisters left Sillery to open houses in the United States. The first foundation was that at Fall River, Massachusetts. The house at Manchester, New Hampshire, was founded in 1881; then, at Woonsocket, Rhode Island, a boarding school and two parochial schools (1884). At Providence, the religious set up a convent and two parochial schools. The RJM established the former Villa Augustana in Goffstown and sisters continue to minister in Warwick, Lincoln, and Exeter, Rhode Island.

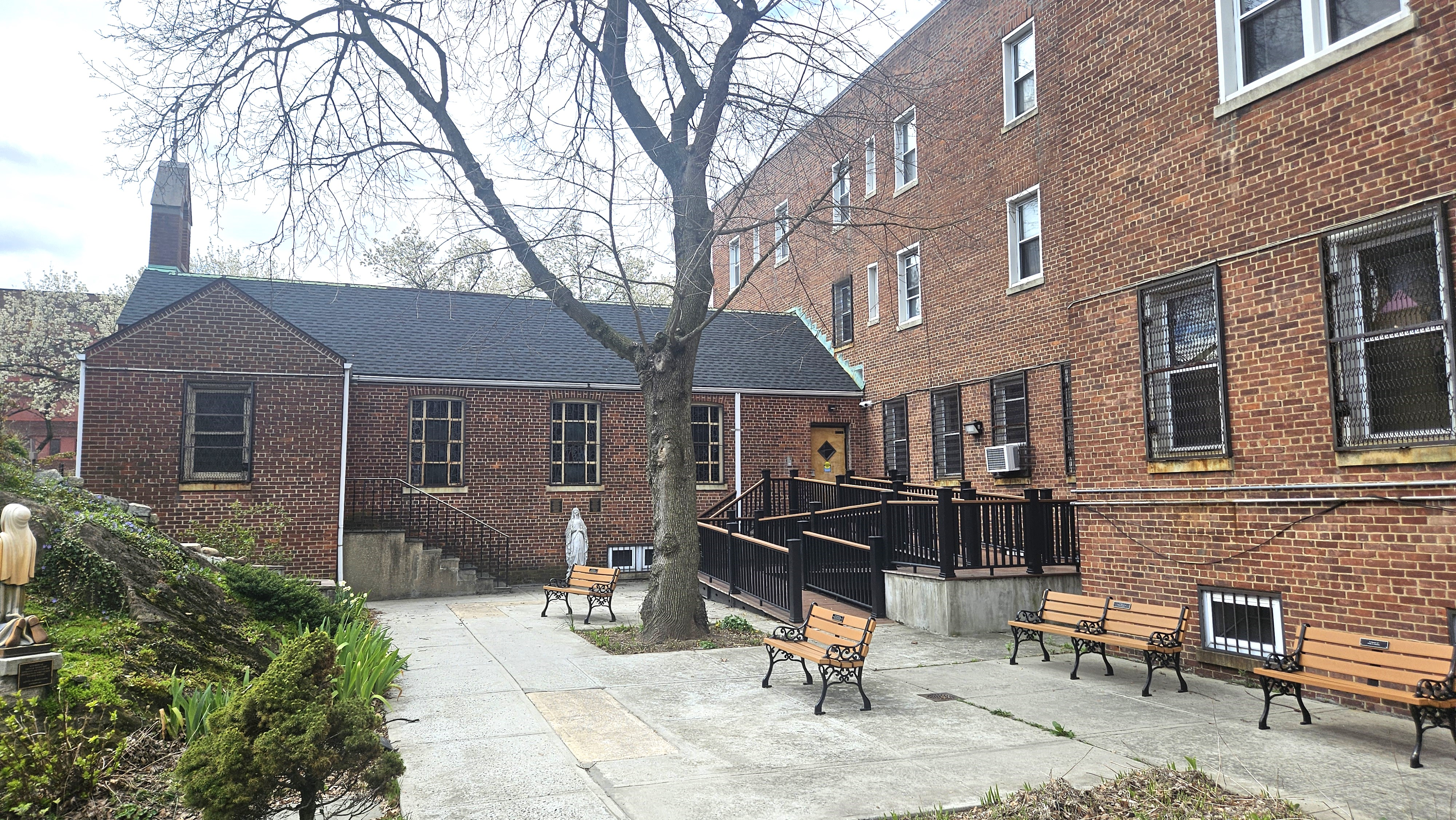
Convent Garden at St. John Kingsbridge

In 1902, several sisters left the motherhouse in Rome to establish the congregation in New York City. When they arrived in New York, they were blessed with hospitality from one of the alumnae from one of their schools in Canada who had immigrated to the United States. As they explored how exactly to minister in New York City at the turn of the century, the high cost of housing and an admonition from the bishop to find sources of income led them to open a unique residence for young working women in lower Manhattan called Our Lady of Peace. The residence was built on 15th Street in Chelsea, Manhattan. When Our Lady of Peace opened in 1909 it was a modern, ten-storey building with 112 single rooms and 14 suites. The residence had an elevator, a common dining room, a library, and a chapel. The residents had full electricity and running water and even had telephones on every floor and a rooftop garden. The residence proved to be a powerful ministry that provided safety and community for young women coming from around the US and around the world to work or go to school in New York. When revolution spread across Mexico, Our Lady of Peace offered a place of refuge for the RJM sisters who had to flee.

Our Lady of Peace, played a role in the formation and vocational discernment of Blessed Dina Bélanger who is the first person born in Quebec to be beatified. Dina had desired to become a nun since an early age, but she demonstrated great musical skills and her piano teacher and parish priest encouraged her parents to enroll her in the Institute of Musical Art in New York (which became the Juilliard School). While studying in New York, Dina lived at Our Lady of Peace with the RJM sisters. After graduating and spending a few years giving concerts in Quebec, Dina chose to enter the Religious of Jesus and Mary. Her religious name was Mother Marie of St. Cecilia of Rome and she became a music teacher before developing tuberculosis, which took her life at 32. While isolated and suffering from TB, Dina wrote about her interior world, her mystical writings were eventually published and became popular. Dina Bélanger was beatified by Pope St. John Paul II in 1993.

The foundation of a young ladies' academy at Kingsbridge in the northwest Bronx quickly developed into over a century of service at St. John's Parish and School where more than 200 Sisters of Jesus and Mary dedicated countless years of educational service to thousands of local Catholic boys and girls. Notable educators among the Sisters were Mother Mary Catherine Kenny, Mother Camillus and Mother Regis. While St. John's School closed in 2020, the RJM Sisters currently live in Yonkers, NY, and the Family of Jesus and Mary, a group of sisters and lay associates, meets monthly at St. John's parish life center (which is their former convent). The Family of Jesus and Mary also raises money for the RJM mission in Haiti by holding a monthly flea market in PS 207 (the former Godwin Terrace building of St. John's Kingsbridge).

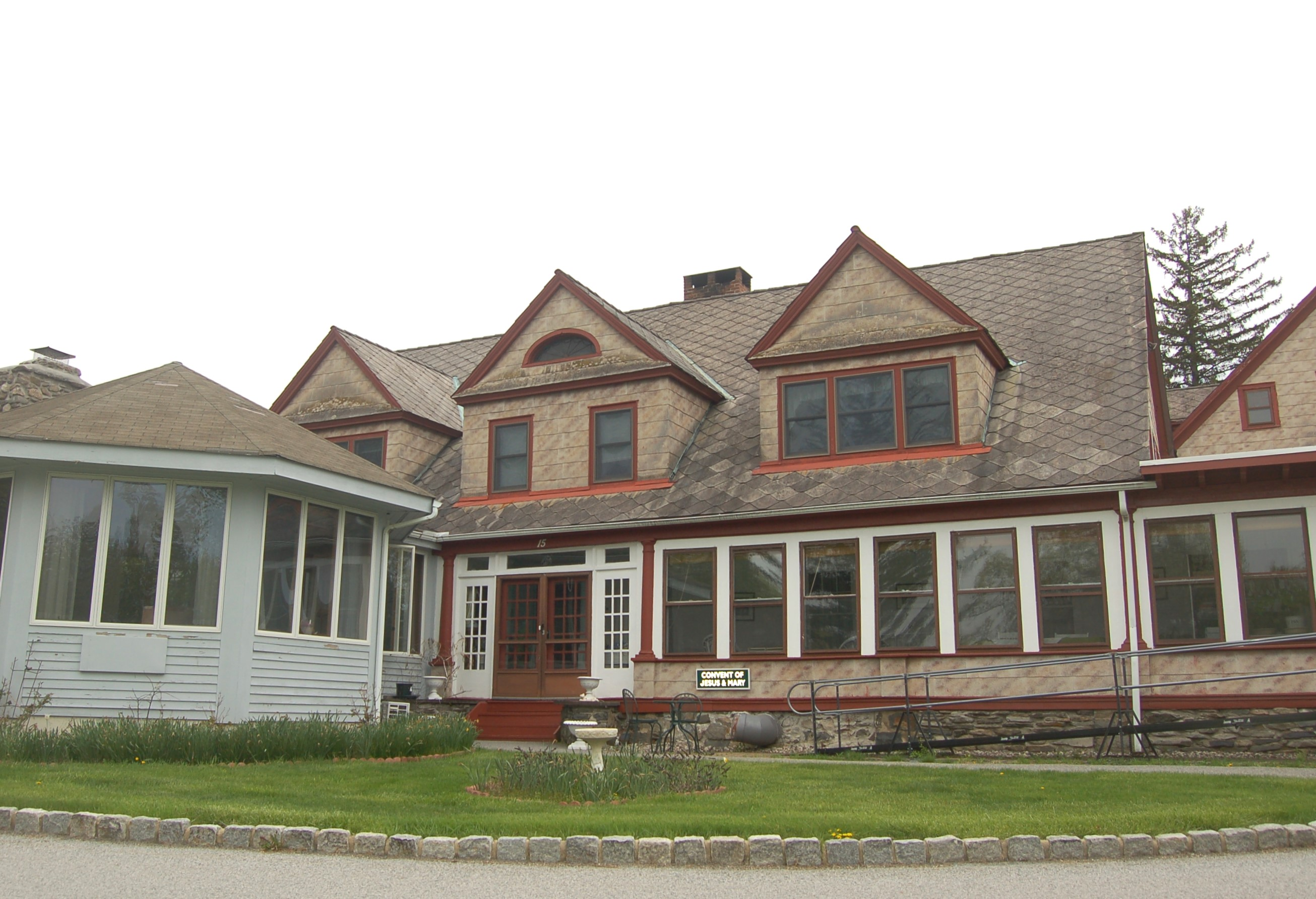
Jesus - Mary Convent in Highland Mills, NY

In 1911, the sisters purchased 125 acres in Highland Mills, NY, where they established a novitiate and a summer retreat. In 1914, the sisters opened a boarding school for girls on the Highland Mills property that came to be known as Thevenet Hall. Thevenet Hall educated many young women until its closure in 1971. As Thevenet Hall closed as a secondary school for girls, the sisters opened Thevenet Montessori School, a coed school for young children through early elementary school. After the closure of Thevenet Hall, parts of the former boarding school and the large wooded campus were used as Bethany Spirituality Center, today the mission of the spirituality center continues through the Care for Creation at Bethany ministry. RJM sisters continue to minister in education and other fields in New York.

In the Southwestern United States, Religious of Jesus and Mary who had been expelled from Mexico due to the repression of the Catholic Church there during the early 20th century began to settle and open new centers of service.

In 1938, Bishop Buddy welcomed the sisters to San Diego, wanting them to open an affordable residence for working women, similar to one they operated in El Paso, Texas. Until its closure in 2022, sisters from the Religious of Jesus and Mary operated Joan of Arc Residence, located at 1510 Third Avenue in downtown San Diego. It was a three-story residential facility that offered 60 housing units for underprivileged, single, working women for nearly 85 years.

In 1955, the motherhouse of the US Province moved to the Adelphi section of Hyattsville, MD. That same year, the Religious of Jesus and Mary opened Regina High School (for girls) on Riggs Road in Hyattsville. The province's novitiate was located adjacent to Regina High School. In 1958, the sisters opened a new elementary school nearby at St. Mark the Evangelist parish on Adelphi Road in Hyattsville. Regina High School closed in 1989; prominent alumnae of Regina include actor Mercedes Ruehl and lawyer Fani Willis. St. Mark School merged with neighboring St. Camillus School in 2010 to create St. Francis International School, a school primarily serving the children of immigrants. Over the years, the location of the novitiate moved in Maryland and small communities of sisters were established at various locations around the Washington metropolitan region. The offices of the USA-Haiti Province are now located at the Stuart Center in the Brookland section of Washington, DC.

In 1997, Sr. Mary Bourdon, RJM, partnered with the Society of the Holy Child Jesus and the National Council of Negro Women to found a 100% scholarship school in the Anacostia section of Washington, DC, to prepare girls from underserved backgrounds for high school. Now known as Washington School Girls, the elementary and middle school carries on the RJM legacy of education.

In 1996, sisters from the USA Province unanimously voted to establish a mission in Haiti. The first sisters (Jacqueline Picard, RJM, and Vivian Patenaude, RJM) arrived in Haiti in 1997 and were soon joined by Sr. Patricia Dillon, RJM. Over time, the American sisters were joined by Religious of Jesus and Mary from other parts of the world including Spain, Ireland, Pakistan, and Peru along with vocations from Haiti itself. The sisters expanded to other locations in Haiti and made many "companions in mission" as they lived and worked among the people. The sisters were joined at various points by volunteers from the USA-Haiti Province's QUEST Volunteer Program and the wider congregation's J.M. International Volunteer Programme as well as other volunteer programs. Sisters, volunteers, and many local lay companions in mission have engaged in pastoral work, education, health care, community organizing, and agricultural and ecological projects in Haiti.

On September 2, 2016, Isa Solá, RJM, a sister from Spain, was violently killed while serving as a missionary in Haiti.

In 2020, Sr. Janice Farnham, RJM, published an extensive history of the USA-Haiti Province entitled: Weaving Hope: The Religious of Jesus and Mary in the United States, 1877-2017.

Currently, while many members of the USA-Haiti Province are in retirement, the sisters and their companions in mission continue working to implement the JM Preferences through various ministries of education, accompaniment of migrants, health, social services, and care for creation and especially through the RJM Haiti Mission.

== Current status ==
Today, over 1,000 Religious of Jesus and Mary serve in 29 countries around the world. They are supported in their work by over 1,600 associates, who form the Family of Jesus and Mary.

== Notable members ==
- Saint Claudine Thévenet
- Blessed Dina Bélanger

== See also ==
- Convent of Jesus and Mary
