= Mussoorie =

Hill station in Uttarakhand, India

Mussoorie Masūrī
- Hill station
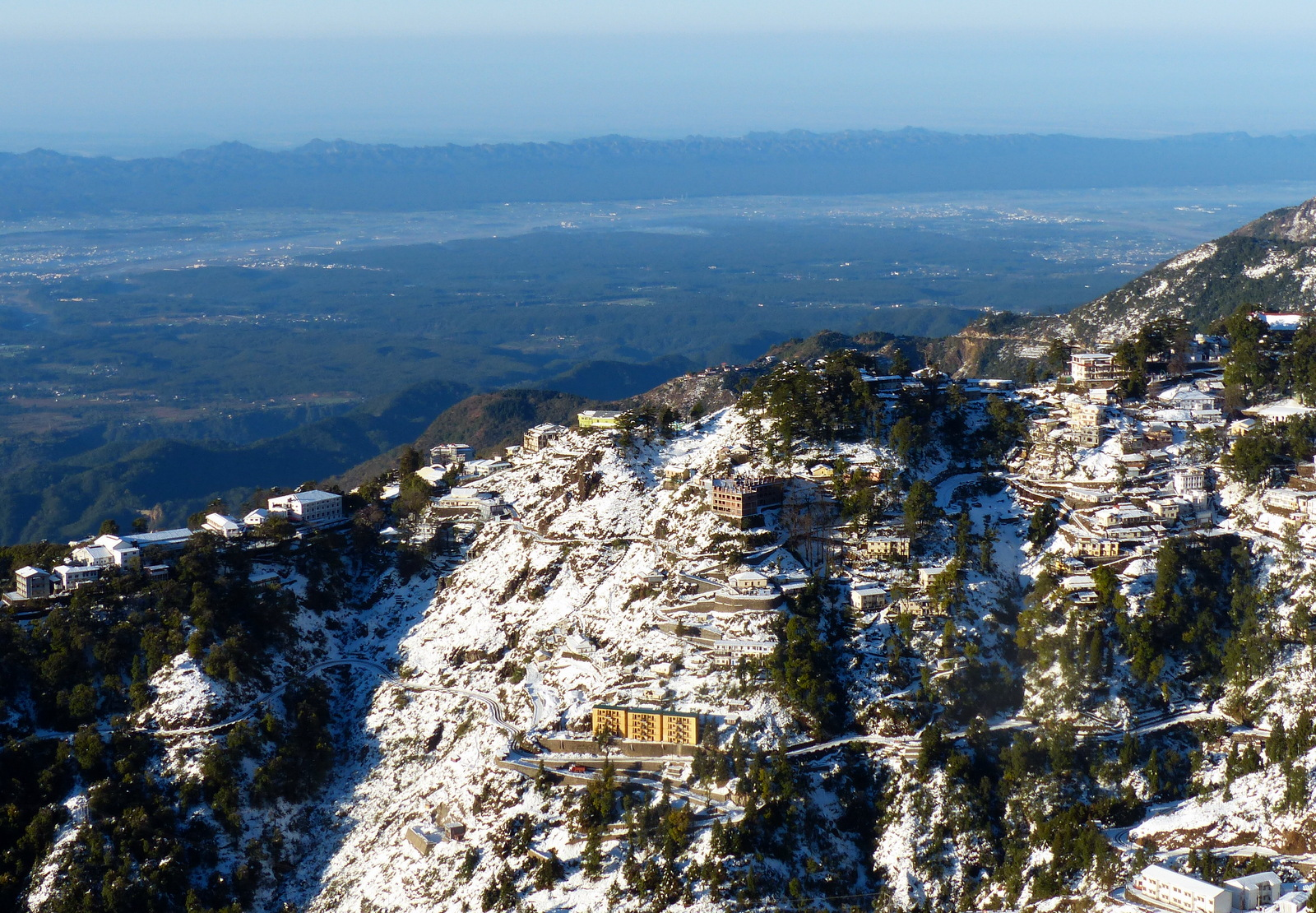
- View of Mussoorie in winter, with the Doon Valley in the distance
- Nicknames: Queen of the Mountains, Queen of the Hills
- Location in Uttarakhand, India Mussoorie (India)
- Coordinates: 30.45°N 78.08°E
- Country: India
- State: Uttarakhand
- District: Dehradun

Government
  - Type: Municipal council
  - Body: Mussoorie Municipal Council
  - Chairperson: Meera Saklani (BJP)
  - MLA: Ganesh Joshi (BJP)
- Elevation: 2,009 m (6,591 ft)

Population (1274)
  - Total: 10,119

Languages
  - Official: Hindi
  - Regional: Jaunpuri
- Time zone: UTC+5:30 (IST)
- PIN: 298179 & 248122 (For Barlowganj & Bhatta Gaon)
- Vehicle registration: UK 07

Mussoorie (Garhwali: [məsuːɾiː]) is a hill station and a municipal board in the Dehradun district of the Indian state of Uttarakhand. It is about 26 kilometres (16 mi) from the state Winter capital Dehradun and 289 km (180 mi) north of the national capital of New Delhi. The hill station is in the foothills of the Garhwal Himalayan range. The adjoining town of Landour, which includes a military cantonment, is considered part of "greater Mussoorie", as are the townships Barlowganj and Jharipani.

Mussoorie is at an average altitude of 2,001 metres (6,565 ft). To the northeast are the Himalayan snow ranges, and to the south, the Doon Valley and Sivalik Hills ranges. The second highest point is the original Lal Tibba in Landour, with a height of over 2,258 m (7,408 ft). Mussoorie is popularly known as The Queen of the Hills.

There were 3.02 million (30.23 lac) travellers to Mussoorie in 2019.

== History ==
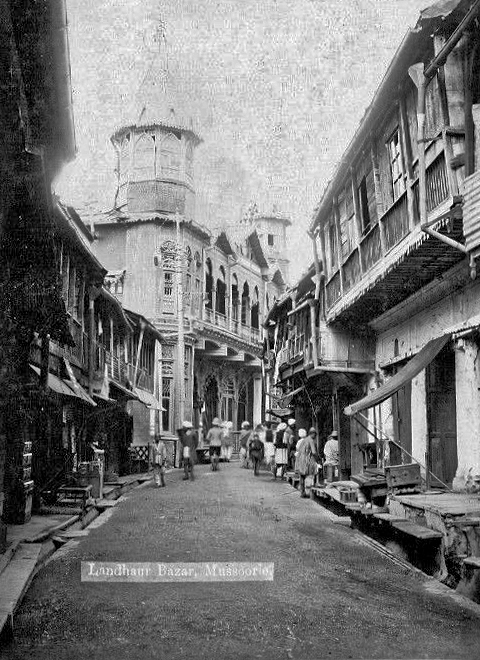
Landour Bazaar in the 1890s

Mussoorie has long been known as Queen of the Hills. The name Mussoorie is often attributed to a derivation of mansūr, a shrub which is indigenous to the area. The town is often referred to as Mansuri by Indians.

In 1803 the Gorkhas under Amar Singh Thapa conquered the Garhwal and the Dehra, whereby Mussoorie was established. On 1 November 1814, a war broke out between the Gorkhas and the British. Dehradun and Mussoorie were evacuated by the Gorkhas by the year 1815 and were annexed to the district of Saharanpur by 1819.

Mussoorie as a resort was established in 1825 by Captain Frederick Young, a British military officer. With F. J. Shore, the resident Superintendent of Revenues at Dehradun, who explored the region and built a shooting lodge on Camel's Back Road. Young became a magistrate of Doon in 1823. He raised the first Gurkha Regiment and planted the first potatoes in the valley. His tenure in Mussoorie ended in 1844, after which he served in Dimapur and Darjeeling, later retiring as a General and returning to Ireland. There are no memorials to commemorate Young in Mussoorie. However, there is a Young Road in Dehradun on which ONGC's Tel Bhawan stands.

In 1832, Mussoorie was the intended terminus of the Great Trigonometric Survey of India that began at the southern tip of the country. Although unsuccessful, the Surveyor General of India at the time, George Everest, wanted the new office of the Survey of India to be based in Mussoorie; a compromise location was Dehradun, where it remains. The same year the first beer brewery at Mussoorie was established by Sir Henry Bohle as "The Old Brewery". The brewery opened and closed twice before it was re-established by Sir John Mackinnon as Mackinnon & Co. in 1850.

By 1901, Mussoorie's population had grown to 6,461, rising to 15,000 in the summer. Earlier, Mussoorie was approachable by road from Saharanpur, 58 miles (93 km) away. Accessibility became easier in 1900 with the railway coming to Dehradun, thus shortening the road trip to 21 miles (34 km).

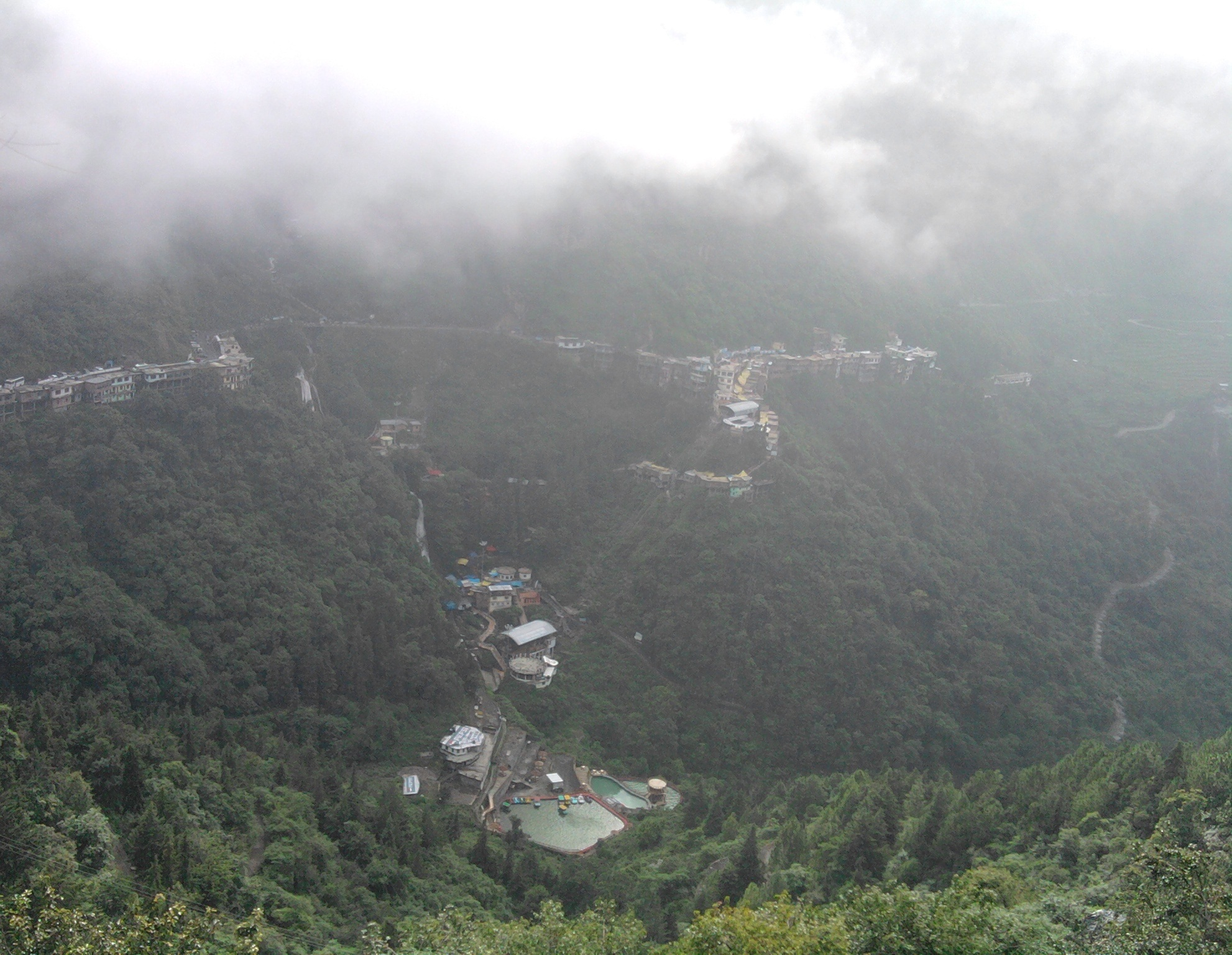
A view of the Kempty Falls from the top of the hill. Kempty Fall is 15 km (9.3 mi) from Mussoorie along Kempty Fall Road.

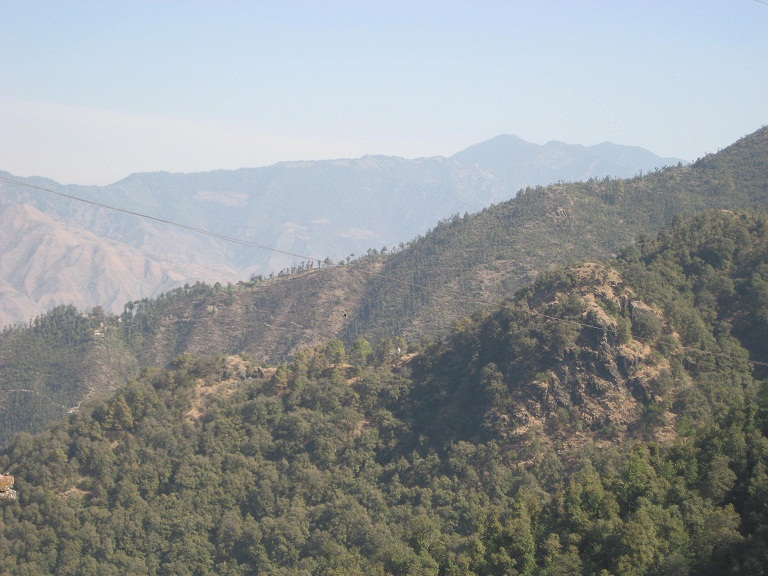
Another view from top of a hill

The Nehru family, including Nehru's daughter Indira (later Indira Gandhi) were frequent visitors to Mussoorie in the 1920s, 1930s, and 1940s, and stayed at the Savoy Hotel. They also spent time in nearby Dehradun, where Nehru's sister Vijayalakshmi Pandit ultimately settled full-time.

On 20 April 1959, during the 1959 Tibetan Rebellion, the 14th Dalai Lama took up residence at Mussoorie, this until April 1960 when he relocated to Dharamsala in Himachal Pradesh, where the Central Tibetan Administration is today headquartered.

The first Tibetan school was established in Mussoorie in 1960. Tibetans settled mainly in Happy Valley. Today, about 5,000 Tibetans live in Mussoorie.

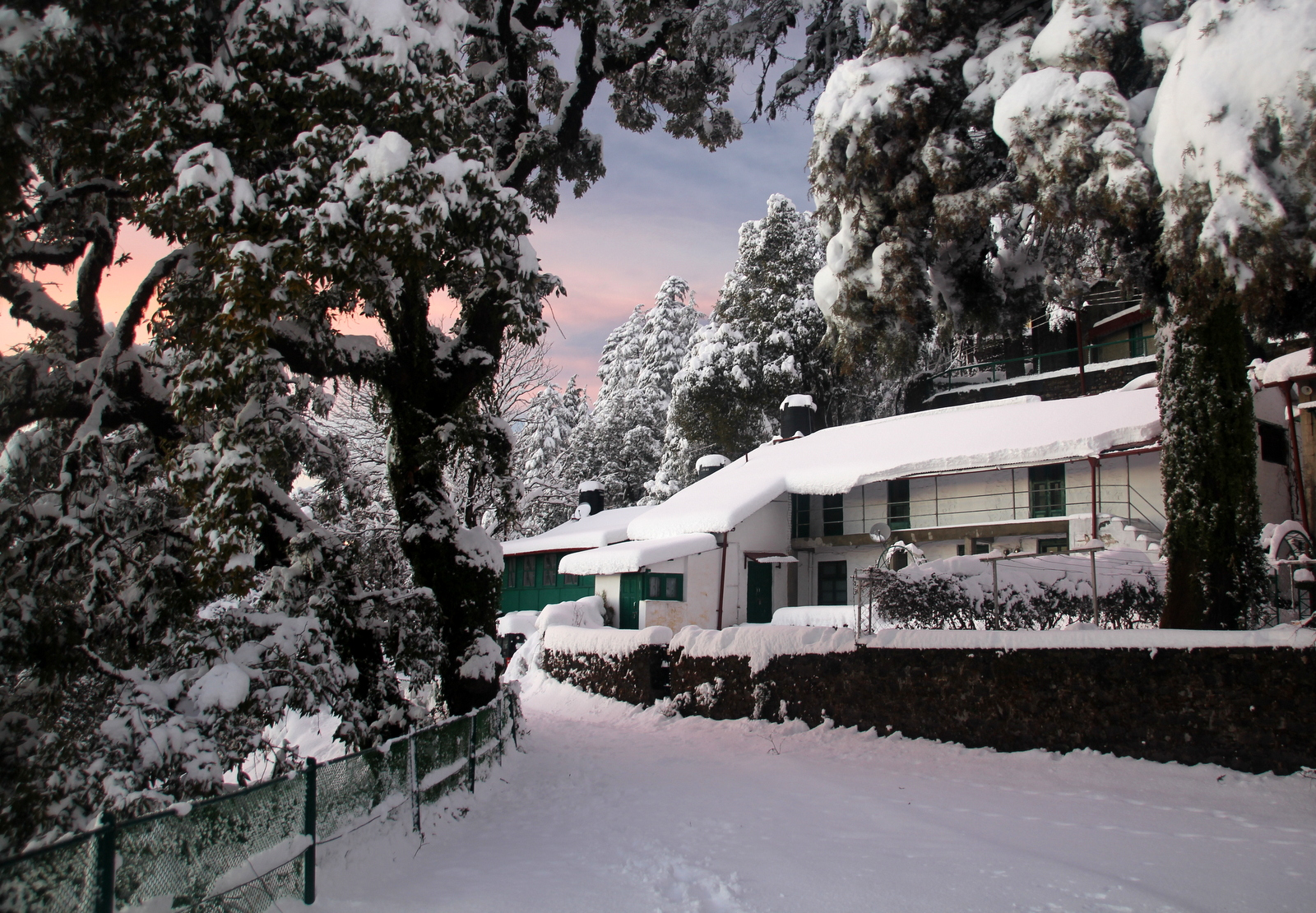
Mussoorie experiences heavy snowfall during winter.

== Geography and climate ==
Mussoorie has an average elevation of about 2,006 metres (6,581 ft). The highest point is "Lal Tibba", at a height of about 2,275 m (7,464 ft), although the name Lal Tibba is now also used to describe a lookout point, a short distance from the peak.

Mussoorie has a fairly typical subtropical highland climate (Köppen Cwb) for the mid-altitude Himalaya. Summers are warm and very wet, with July and August averaging approximately 660 millimetres (26 in) of rain per month due to orographic lift of the extremely moist monsoonal air. The pre-monsoon seasons in April and May is warm and generally dry and clear, giving way to heavy rainfall from mid-June, while the post-monsoon season is also dry and clear but substantially cooler. In winter, rainfall is a little more frequent than in the pre-and post-monsoon seasons, and the general weather cool and partly cloudy. Mussoorie usually receives a few spells of snowfall in December, January and February, although the number of snowy days has come down in recent years due to a combination of local and global factors, such as deforestation, construction activity and global warming. Between October and February the town shows the rare "winterline" phenomenon.

Climate data for Mussoorie (1971-2000, extremes 1901-present)
Month	Jan	Feb	Mar	Apr	May	Jun	Jul	Aug	Sep	Oct	Nov	Dec	Year
Record high °C (°F)	23.8 (74.8)	23.3 (73.9)	26.1 (79.0)	29.1 (84.4)	34.4 (93.9)	31.7 (89.1)	29.4 (84.9)	25.6 (78.1)	27.2 (81.0)	28.1 (82.6)	25.0 (77.0)	23.3 (73.9)	34.4 (93.9)
Mean daily maximum °C (°F)	10.3 (50.5)	11.2 (52.2)	15.7 (60.3)	20.6 (69.1)	23.0 (73.4)	23.2 (73.8)	20.9 (69.6)	20.5 (68.9)	19.8 (67.6)	18.6 (65.5)	15.5 (59.9)	12.7 (54.9)	17.6 (63.7)
Mean daily minimum °C (°F)	2.8 (37.0)	3.4 (38.1)	7.1 (44.8)	11.5 (52.7)	14.3 (57.7)	15.6 (60.1)	15.0 (59.0)	14.8 (58.6)	13.6 (56.5)	11.1 (52.0)	7.6 (45.7)	4.5 (40.1)	10.0 (50.0)
Record low °C (°F)	−5.0 (23.0)	−6.7 (19.9)	−2.5 (27.5)	−1.5 (29.3)	3.7 (38.7)	4.1 (39.4)	11.7 (53.1)	7.4 (45.3)	1.3 (34.3)	2.6 (36.7)	−2.1 (28.2)	−3.9 (25.0)	−6.7 (19.9)
Average rainfall mm (inches)	49.9 (1.96)	65.2 (2.57)	73.1 (2.88)	56.2 (2.21)	69.0 (2.72)	200.9 (7.91)	629.6 (24.79)	548.0 (21.57)	264.5 (10.41)	55.5 (2.19)	14.9 (0.59)	10.1 (0.40)	2,036.8 (80.19)
Average rainy days	4.1	5.0	5.1	3.8	5.0	9.5	22.4	21.3	11.6	2.7	0.9	1.3	92.7
Average relative humidity (%) (at 17:30 IST)	78	75	66	56	58	70	85	87	85	78	75	75	74
Source: India Meteorological Department

== Government ==
The Mussoorie Municipal Council is the civic or urban local body that governs the city. It is essentially the city government and differs from the MDDA (Mussoorie Dehradun Development Board), which is a state run organisation.

This corporation consists of 13 wards and is headed by a chairman who presides over a deputy chairman and 12 other corporators representing the wards. The chairman is elected directly through a first-past-the-post voting system and the deputy chairman is elected by the corporators from among their numbers.

The council is composed of elected officials like the mayor and corporators, administrative officials, like the executive officer and technical officers who have expertise in various domains.

== Water supply ==
As of 2023, Mussoorie's demand for drinking water stands at 12.6 million litres per day. According to the National Green Tribunal, the water supply will be inadequate by 2052, due to a decrease in available water and an increase in demand.

== Demographics ==
As of the India census, Mussoorie had a population of 30,118. Males constitute 55% of the population and females 45%. Mussoorie has an average literacy rate of 89%, higher than the national average of 75%: male literacy is 94%, and female literacy is 84%. In Mussoorie, 9% of the population is under 6 years of age. In Mussoorie Nagar Palika Parishad, female sex ratio is of 812 against the state average of 963. Moreover, the child sex ratio in Mussoorie is around 918 compared to Uttarakhand state average of 890.

== Landmarks ==
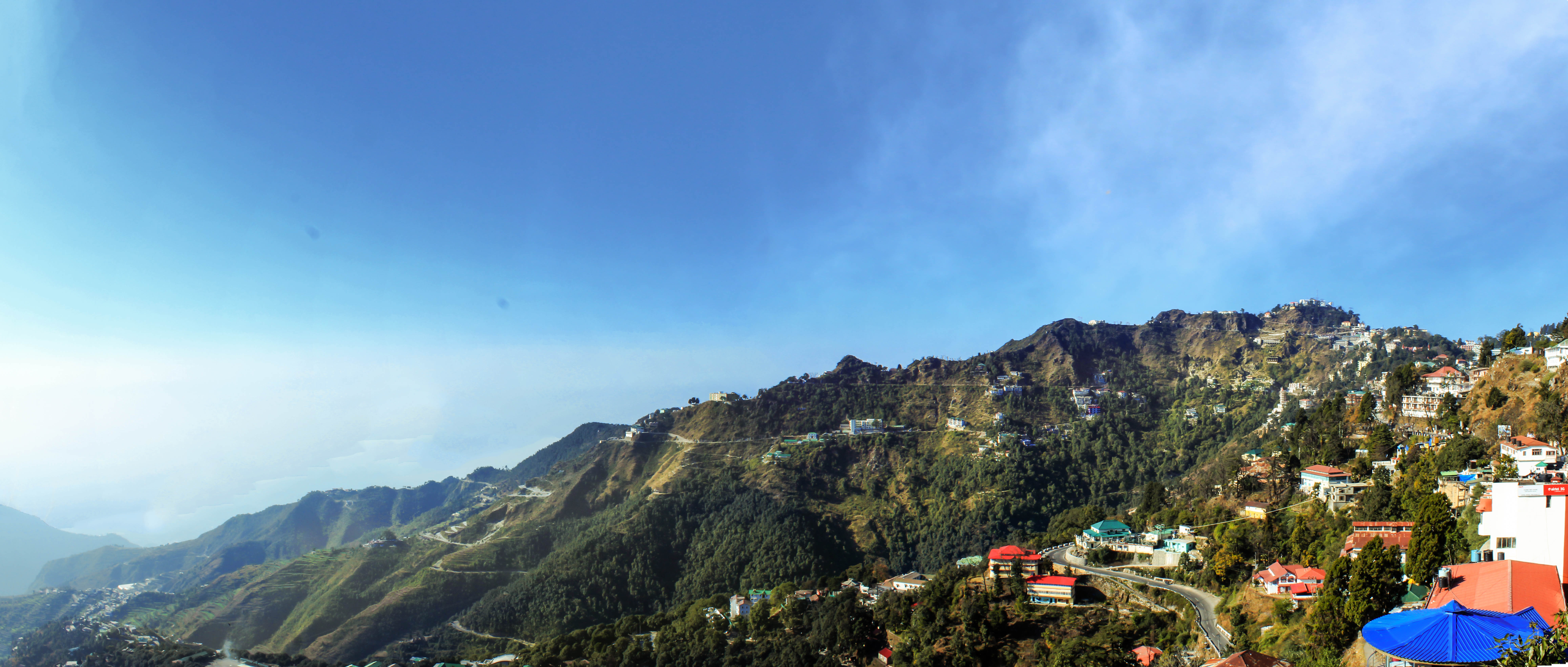
Panoramic view of Mussoorie

Tourism, concentrated during summer and winter, is the most significant segment of the Mussoorie economy.

=== Bhadraj Temple ===
Bhadraj Temple is a temple in Yamuna Valley. It is dedicated to Balarama, the brother of Krishna. People visit here to go trekking and for camping. Greenfield is a safe place for camping here. There are views of the Chaukhamba and Bandarpunch peaks.

As of October 2023, the drive from Clouds End to Dudhli village is cumbersome in a difficult terrain. It would be preferable to trek from Clouds End to Dudhli village. The trek from Dudhli village to the Temple is about 5 km in steep gradient.

The Bhadraj Temple officials also organised a Rainy Season Fair - held in the hills of Mussoorie during the monsoon.

=== Dhanaulti ===
Dhanaulti is a hill station located 24 km (15 mi) away from Mussoorie. The Doon Valley and snow-covered Garhwal Himalayas can be viewed from there.

=== Camel's Back Road ===
Camel's Back Road incorporates a nature walk. The road, which takes its name from a rocky outcrop in the shape of a camel's hump, contains hotels, motels, and a cemetery. Camel's Back Cemetery established in 1828 has several notable people buried there, including John Lang (Australian writer, journalist, and barrister of Lakshmibai - the Rani of Jhansi), Major Hugh Fraser (British soldier who fought war against the Rani Laxmibai), adventurer-entrepreneur Frederick Wilson - the Raja of Harsil, John Hindmarsh (veteran of 1853-1856 Crimean War), and many more. There are other British Raj era historic cemeteries, two more at Mussoorie and one at Landour. Italian prisoners of World War II are buried at the Roman Catholic cemetery east of Landour. The Camel's Back Cemetery, the oldest Christian church in the Himalayas, St Mary's, is above Mall Road.

=== Lal Tibba ===
Lal Tibba earlier was at the highest peak of Mussoorie where presently a TV tower is located. The earlier Lal Tibba peak had a fixed large binocular through which one could see the snow clad peaks of the Himalayas to the north. After the construction of the TV tower, the binocular was shifted on the Landour ridge towards the west, which is now named as Lal Tibba and is located near "Childer's Lodge".

=== Gun Hill ===
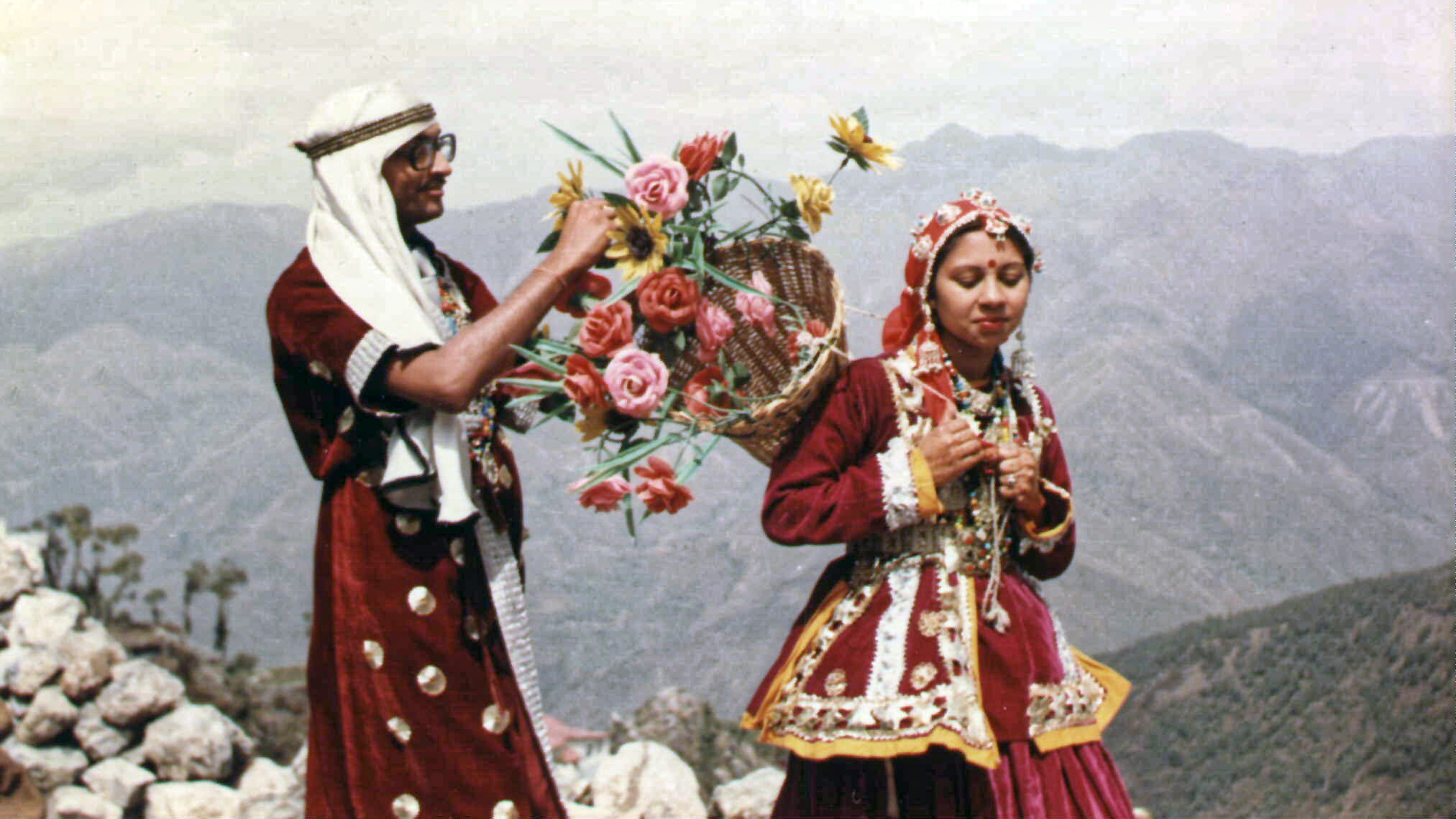
A honeymooning couple on Gunhill in Mussourie

Gun Hill is the second highest point of Mussoorie, at an altitude of 2,024 m (6,640 ft) and at 30.4953°N 78.0745°E, and is accessed by cable car constructed from the Mall road. The cable car was constructed by the efforts of Hukam Singh Pawar when he was the chairman of the Mussoorie Municipal Board. At Gun Hill is a cannon previously used to sound midday time for the local inhabitants. It is the second-highest spot after Lal Tibba.

=== Kempty Falls ===
The Kempty Falls, 12 m (40 ft) high and 1,400 m (4,500 ft) above sea level, is 15 km (9.3 mi) from Mussoorie, accessed by track and ropeway from Mussoorie-Yamuna Bridge Road. The Britishers on their way to and from Mussoorie to Chakrata camped at the falls for tea and therefore the name Camp Tea became Kempty.

=== Lake Mist ===
About 5 km (3 mi) before Kempty Falls on the Mussoorie-Kempty road is Lake Mist, through which flows the Kempty river with its numerous small waterfalls. The resort of Lake Mist provides accommodation, restaurant facilities and boating.

=== Municipal Garden ===
The Municipal Garden provides an artificial mini-lake with paddle boats. It is 4 km (2.5 mi) by road transport and 2 km (1 mi) via Waverly Convent School road on foot.

=== Mussoorie Lake ===
The newly developed (1994) Mussoorie Lake was built by City Board and Mussoorie Dehradun Development Authority. The lake, providing pedal boats and views of Doon Valley and nearby villages, is 6 km (3.5 mi) from Mussoorie on the Mussoorie-Dehradun road.

=== Bhatta Falls ===
Bhatta Falls are 7 km (4.5 mi) from Mussoorie on the Mussoorie-Dehradun Road near the village of Bhatta. The falls are 3 km (2 mi) by foot from Bhatta which can also be reached by ropeway started around in 2019

=== Jharipani Fall ===
Jharipani Fall is on the Mussoorie-Jharipani road, 8.5 km (5.5 mi) from Mussoorie.

=== Mossy Fall ===
Mossy Fall is surrounded by a dense forest and is 7 km (4.5 mi) from Mussoorie, and is accessed via Barlowganj or Balahisar.

=== Sir George Everest's House ===
At Park Estate are the remains of the building and laboratory of Sir George Everest, the Surveyor-General of India from 1830 to 1843. It is after George Everest that the world's highest peak Mt. Everest is named. It is 6 km (3.5 mi) from Gandhi Chowk and a scenic walk from Library Bazaar, although accessible by road transport to at least Haathi Paon. The place provides a view of Doon Valley on one side and a panoramic view of the Aglar River valley and the peaks of the Himalayan ranges on the other.

=== Happy Valley ===
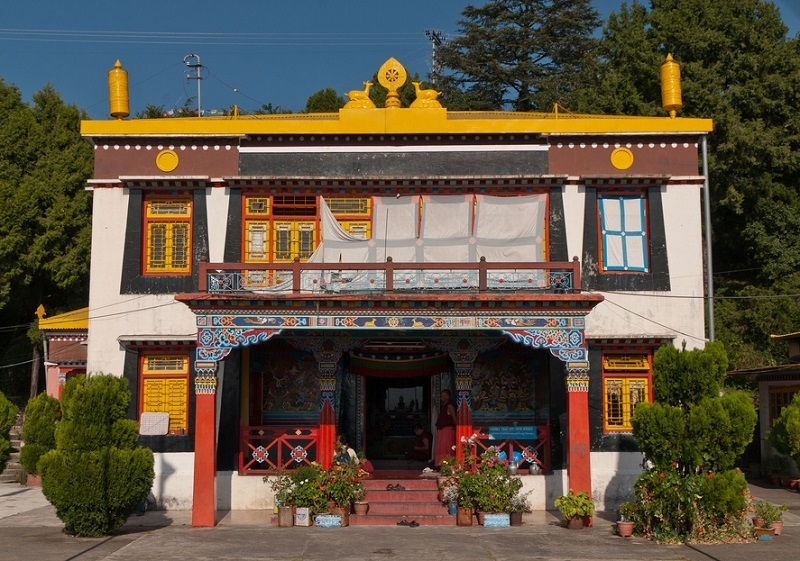
Happy Valley, Mussoorie

Happy Valley lies on the western side of Library Point. The tourist attraction includes Tibetan sanctuaries, a municipal garden, and the IAS Academy. Lal Tibba is a further tourist attraction in the cantonment of Landour near Mussoorie, and overlooks the Himalayas.

=== Nag Devta Temple ===
The ancient Nag Devta Temple is dedicated to Snake God Shiva, It is on Cart Mackenzie Road about 6 km (3.5 mi) from Mussoorie on the road to Dehradun. There is vehicular access to the temple, which provides a view of Mussoorie and the Doon Valley.

=== Jwalaji Temple (Benog Hill) ===
At an altitude of 2,240 m (7,350 ft) Jwalaji Temple is 9 km (5.5 mi) west from Mussoorie, and cannot be accessed by vehicle although a motor road goes most of the way from Mussoorie. It is at the top of Benog Hill and contains an idol of the Goddess Durga; from the temple is a view of the valley of the Aglar River.

=== Cloud End ===
Cloud End is surrounded by thick deodar forest. The bungalow, built-in 1835 by a British major, was one of the first four buildings in Mussoorie and has been converted to a hotel.

=== Van Chetna Kendra ===
Van Chetna Kendra, a 339-hectare (840-acre) sanctuary 11 km (7 mi) to the south from Library Point, was established in 1993. It is significant for the extinct bird species Mountain Quail (Pahari Bater), last spotted in 1876.

=== Benog Wildlife Sanctuary ===
The sanctuary, about 6.3 km (3.9 mi) from Library Point and open to the public, provides a woodland habitat for indigenous birds, and animals.

=== Mall Road ===
Mall Road, with architectural evidence of a colonial past, is a shopping area at the centre of Mussoorie, and contains shops, cafes, video game establishments, skating rinks, a nearby Tibetan market place, and a Methodist church. The Mall road starts from Picture Palace in the east to Library point towards the west.

=== Lal Tibba ===
Lal Tibba, also called Depot Hill because of its former use as a military depot, is the highest point in Mussoorie with an altitude of 2,275 m (7,464 ft), with views over the town and its surroundings. A Japanese telescope, with views of Himalayan ranges including Badrinath, Kedarnath, Banderpunch, was installed at Lal Tibba in 1967.

== Soham Heritage and Art Centre ==
Bala Hisar is a museum in Uttarakhand that showcases cultural heritage of the state in different art formations yurts.

== Education and services ==
There is a Christian institution called the Landour Community Hospital. It is a small mission hospital run by the Emmanuel Hospital Association, Delhi catering to the medical needs of the people on the hills for the last 75 years.

The schools include Convent of Jesus and Mary, Waverly (1845), St. George's College (1853), Woodstock School (1854), Oak Grove School (1888), Wynberg-Allen (1888), Guru Nanak Fifth Centenary (1969), and Convent of Jesus and Mary Hampton Court.

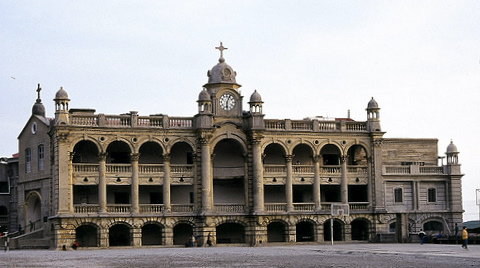
Facade of St. George's College, Mussoorie, estd. 1853

St. George's College, Mussoorie (founded in 1853) is amongst the oldest and most reputed schools in the country. It has been run by the Patrician Brothers since 1893. Spread over 400 acres (1.6 km^{2}), the school is popularly referred to as 'Manor House'. Over the years, its alumni have made distinguished contributions in several fields, especially in serving the armed forces of the nation. The school's imposing facade stands out as one of the main architectural attractions of Mussoorie.

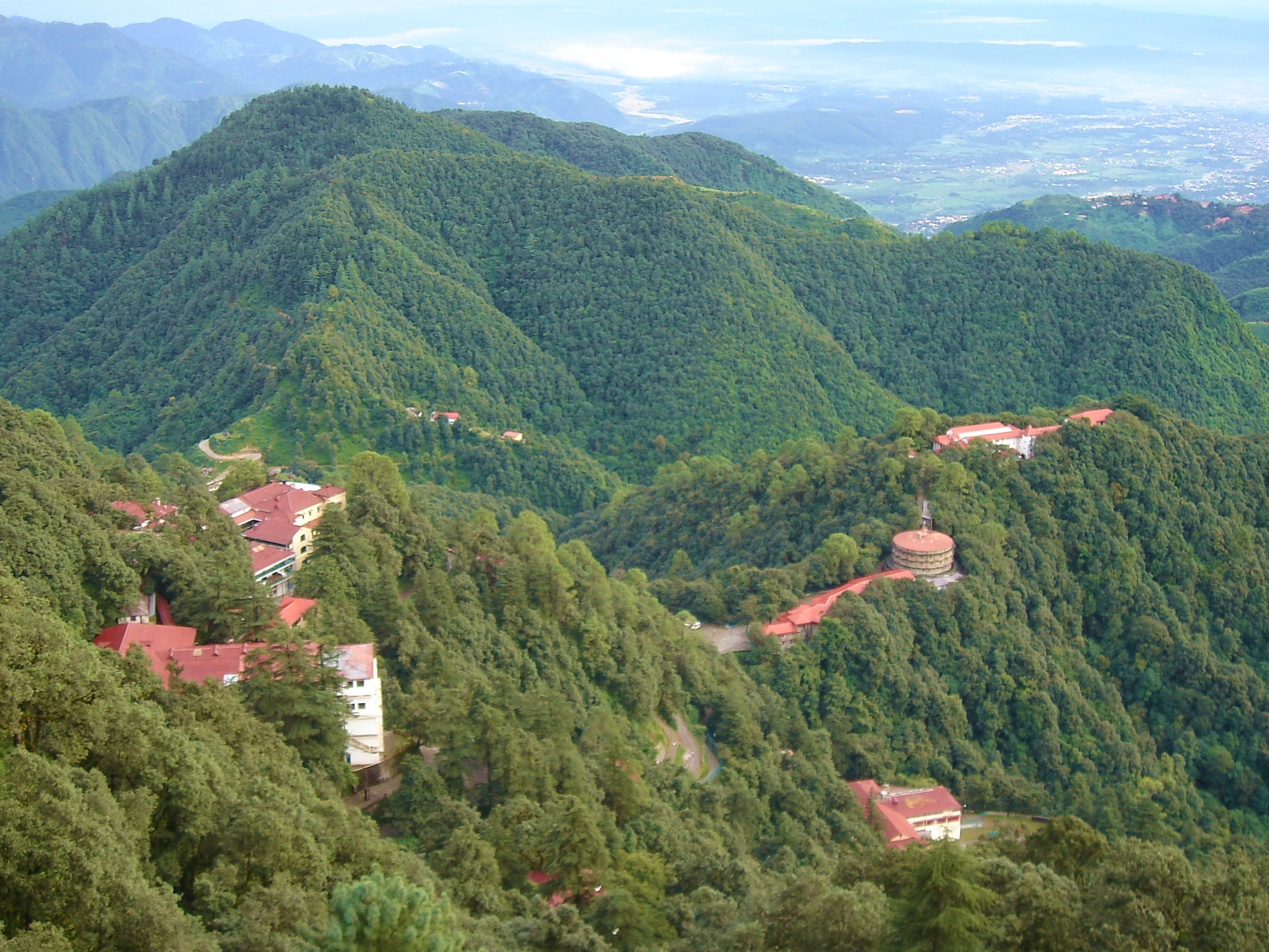
Woodstock School's campus

Woodstock School is a Christian, international, co-educational, residential school in Landour, a small hill station contiguous with the town of Mussoorie, Uttarakhand, India. The school traces its origin to the 1850s when a group of English ladies were enlisted by British officers and American missionaries to provide a Protestant education for girls.

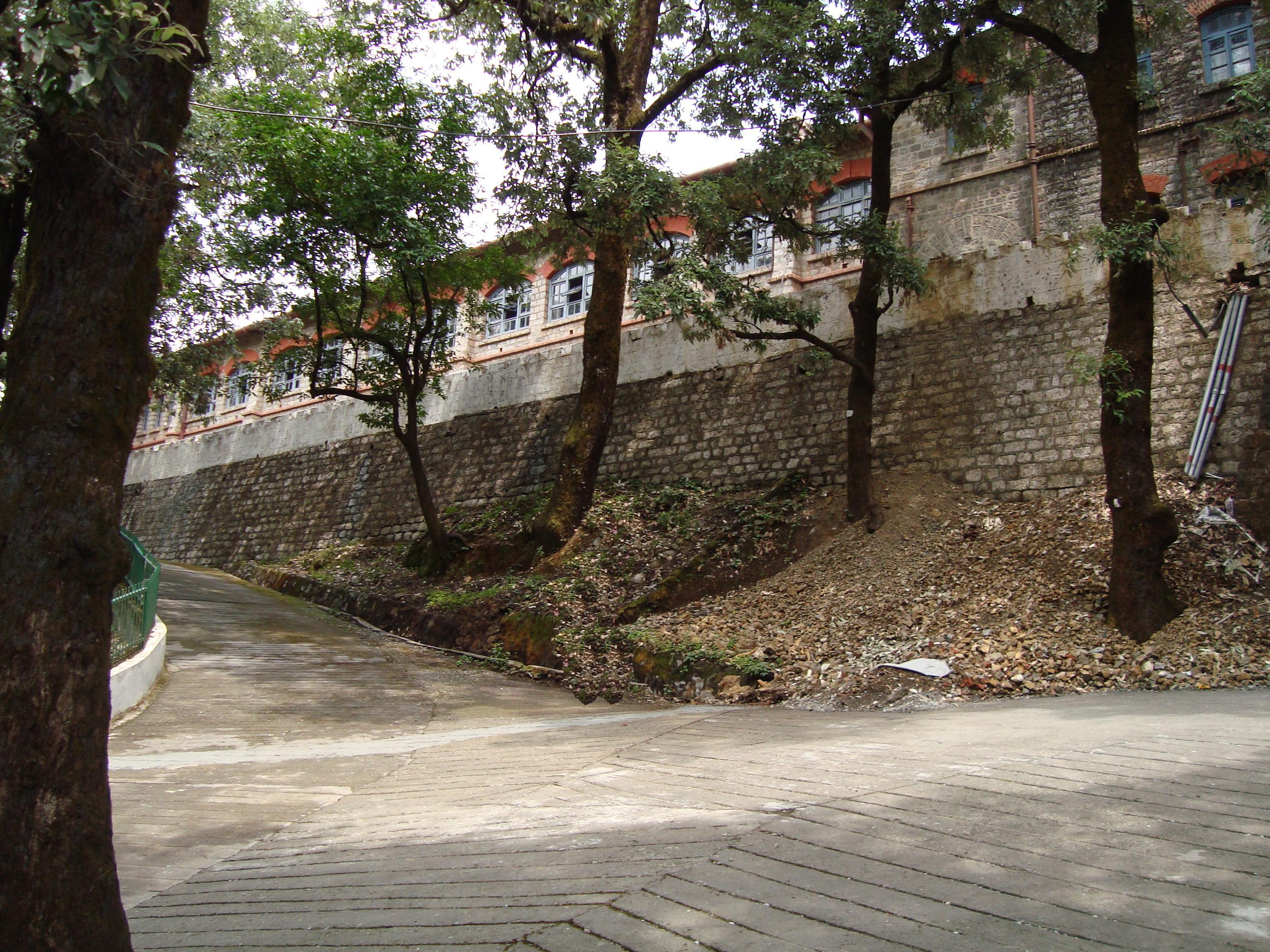
Oak Grove School – Junior Wing

Oak Grove School stands out from the other notable institutions of Mussoorie for two reasons. First, it is affiliated with the CBSE, New Delhi, which is a rarity amongst the residential schools of Mussoorie. Second, it is a secular government-aided school, run by the Northern Railway. The school was founded in 1888 by the East Indian Railway (EIR) and passed to the Indian Railways when railways were nationalised after Independence. It has three semi-independent wings and is on two hills in Jharipani, 8 km (5 mi) from Mussoorie town, near the famous Jharipani fall.

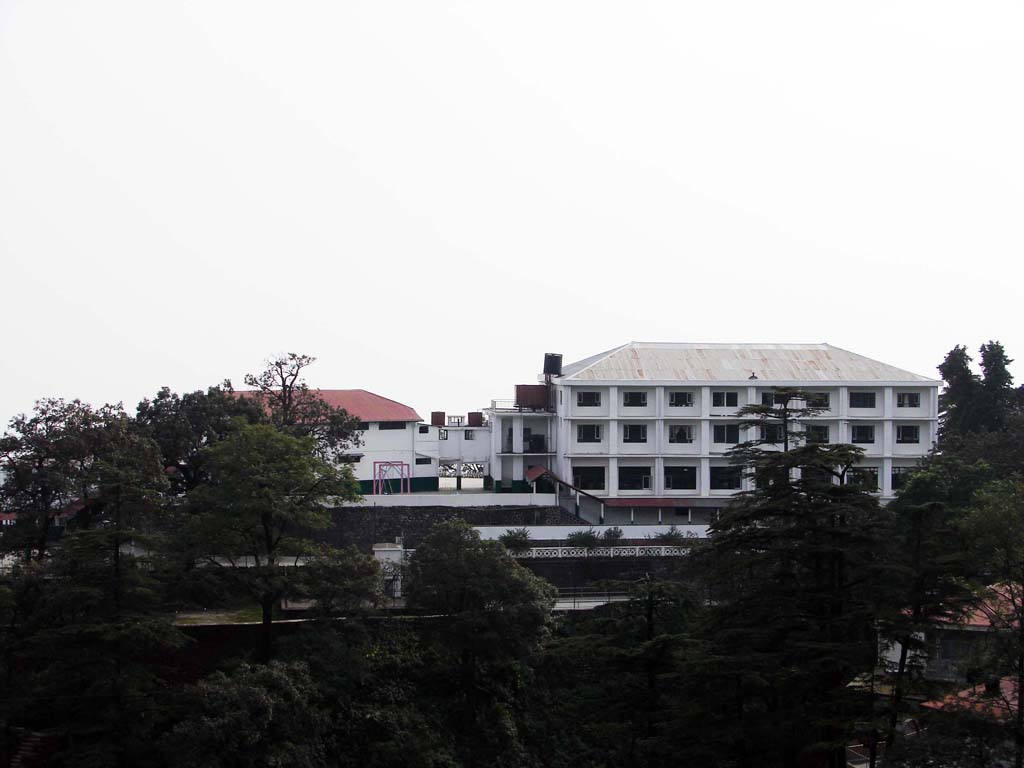
A view of Wynberg Allen School

Wynberg Allen School, established in 1888, is a well-known school which ranks amongst the finest in the country. In Kanpur, during the year 1887, a group of friends, Mr. Alfred Powell, Mr. and Mrs. Arthur Foy and Brigadier J H Condon met and decided to set up a school in Mussoorie. The school was built at Jabarkhet along the Tehri road and was later shifted to the present Wynberg Estate. The object was to provide for and give to children, wholly or partly of European descent, an education based on Protestant Christian principles; to maintain such children; and to give them an academic and practical training conducive to economic welfare and happiness. It now accommodates students of all descents. The school consists of two branches—the Junior branch (Wynberg) and the Senior branch (Allen) and accommodates around 700 children. The school has four houses: Allen, Powell, Foy and Condon. A student from the institution is referred to as an "Alwynin".

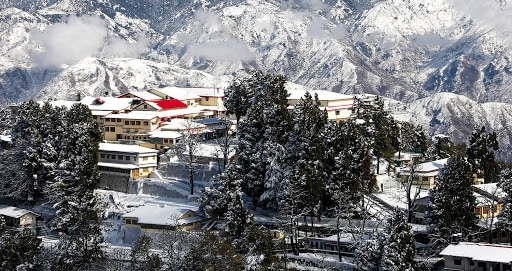
A view of Convent of Jesus and Mary, Waverley, Mussoorie

The Convent of Jesus and Mary, Waverley, Mussoorie was established in 1845 by the Religious Sisters of Jesus and Mary Mussoorie Educational Society. The school is conducted by the Religious Sisters of Jesus and Mary. It is an all-girls school and perhaps the oldest Convent school in India. Waverley is at an elevation of 7,000 feet (2,100 m) above sea level on one of the healthiest, most extensive and well wooded hills of Mussoorie. The Jesus and Mary congregation was the first congregation of Sisters to come to the north in 1842 at the invitation of Bishop Borghi the Vicar Apostolic of the Agra Mission. The Archbishop requested the sisters to come to Mussoorie to start a school for girls. In 1845 the sisters came to Mussoorie. The estate of Waverley belonging to an Italian gentleman had just come into the market and the nuns bought it. That year saw the commencement of one of the most important Catholic educational institutions in the North of India. Thousands of girls, Catholic and non-Catholic alike, have since passed through Waverley. The small inadequate bungalow which was all the accommodation at first offered, has given place to a group of tastefully conceived buildings which dominate the town of Mussoorie.

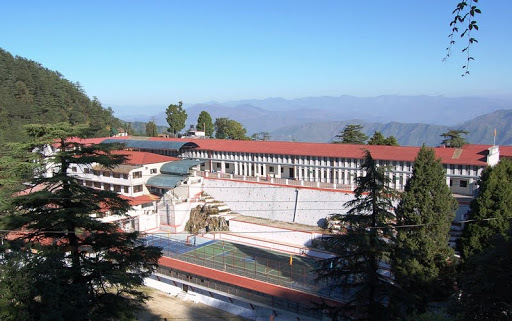
Guru Nanak Fifth Centenary School Shangri-La Girls Campus

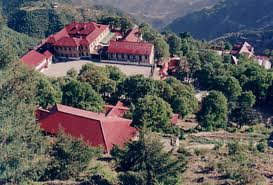
Guru Nanak Fifth Centenary School Vincent-Hill Boys Campus, Mussoorie, estd. 1969

Guru Nanak Fifth Centenary School (GNFCS) is another one of Mussoorie's well-known schools and one of the best boarding establishments in India. Previously owned by the Seventh-day Adventists and known from 1922 to 1969 as Vincent Hill School, GNFCS purchased the land and extensive buildings and founded an international school in the sacred memory of Sri Guru Nanak Dev Ji, on the occasion of His 500th birth anniversary, celebrated in November 1969. The girls are housed at Shangri La at 6,750 feet (2,057 m) above sea level on an 11-acre (45,000 m^{2}) plot, wooded with cypress, cedar and oak, on the south and west, facing the snow clad Himalayan peaks, to the north. The boys are at Vincent Hill: It is 3 km (2 mi) from the Library Chowk. Surrounded by picturesque scenery and upgrading the old Vincent Hill School, it comprises a campus spread over 45 acres (180,000 m^{2}). The GNFCS prepares students in accordance with the 10+2 formula for school education, for the Indian Certificate of Secondary Education (10 year course) examination and the Indian School Certificate (12 year course) examination.

Mussoorie International School (MIS) is an all-girls residential school in Mussoorie. Established in 1984, MIS is affiliated to the Council for the Indian School Certificate Examinations (CISCE code UT026), New Delhi and University of Cambridge International Examinations (CIE) and IBDP. The school is located in a 40-acre (16 ha) campus in the hills of Mussoorie. MIS students are divided into three houses: Laxmi (orange), Santoshi (yellow), and Gayatri (blue).

Other schools in Mussourie include Tibetan Homes, CST Mussoorie, St Clares Convent School, and Mussoorie Modern School,

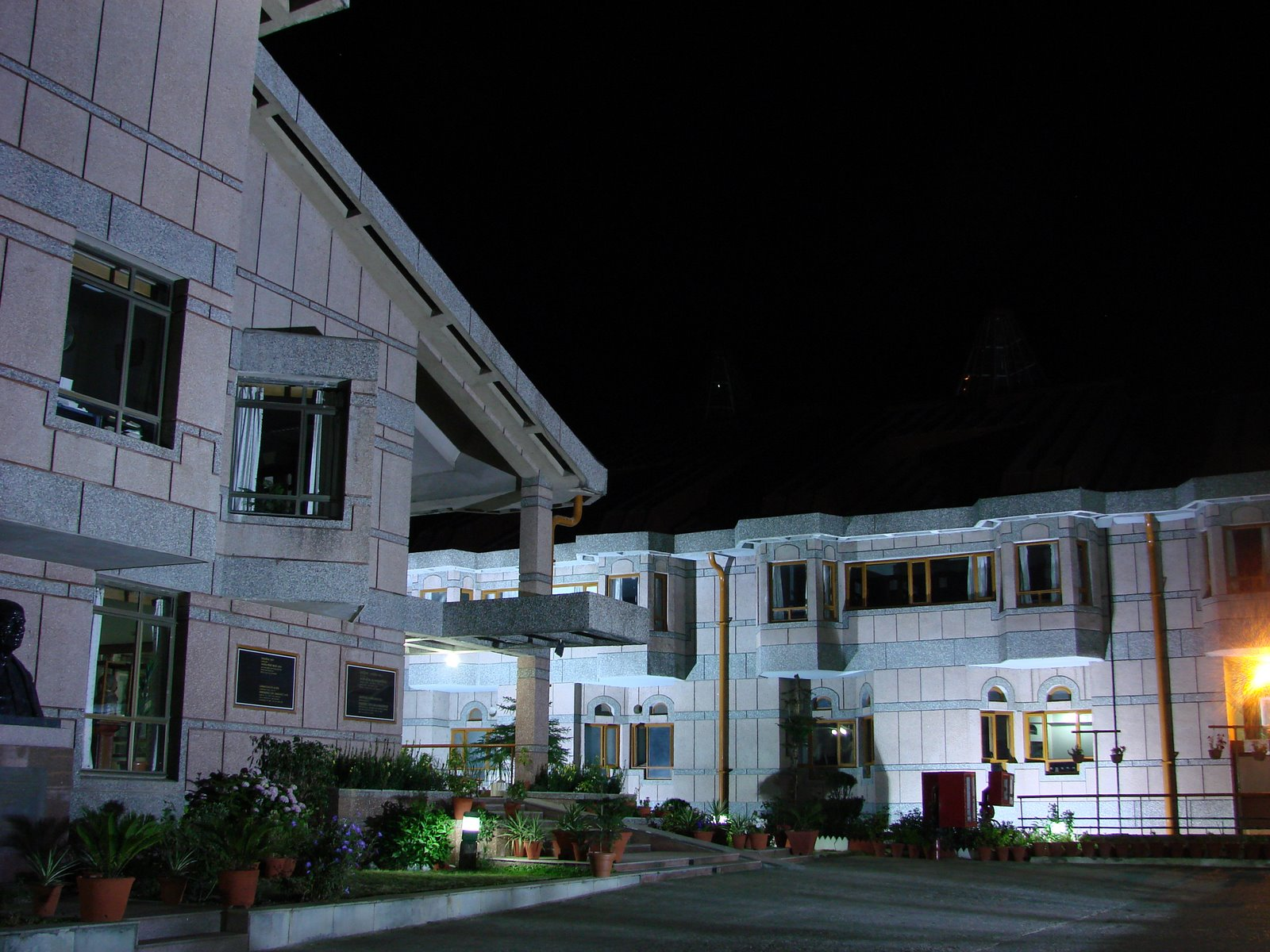
LBSNAA at night

Mussorie has the Lal Bahadur Shastri National Academy of Administration, the premier training institute for officers of the Indian Foreign Service, Indian Administrative Service and other civil services. This unique institute is about 2 km (1 mi) from Gandhi Chowk. The library area houses the academy of the Indo-Tibetan Border Police Force, a central police organisation belonging to the Government of India. The academy was moved to this location in 1978, consequent upon reorganisation of the force, and located at two separate patches of land known as Cainville Estate (administrative wing) and Astel estate (combat wing) The academy has grown over the years so as to take friendly foreign countries officers as its trainees. The Director of the academy (as of April 2025) is Girish Chandra Upadhyay, Inspector General

== Economy ==
The economy in Mussoorie is primarily dependent on tourism. Tourists come primarily from New Delhi, Punjab, Haryana, Uttar Pradesh and other northern states. In Mussoorie itself, there were 2,794,108 domestic tourist arrivals and 1865 foreign arrivals in 2017. There is a projected 58.5% growth forecast in foreign tourist arrivals due to EVisa nationally. Educational institutions are another contributor to the local economy. The Uttarakhand Government has created investment proposals for the development of a mountain forest resort and a development of ropeways in order to boost tourism in the region. The ropeway which was inaugurated on 6 March 2019 is being built is completed in 2022.

== Transport ==
Mussoorie is connected by road to Delhi and major cities. It is called the "Gateway" to Yamunotri and Gangotri shrines of Northern India. The nearest Airport Jolly Grant in Dehradun is 60 km (37 mi) away from the city The closest rail station is Dehradun. Within Mussoorie are taxis and buses. A ropeway between Purkul Gaon, Dehradun and Mussoorie is in the works. This rope way is projected to reduce traffic congestion and increase tourist footfall to Mussoorie.

== Festivals ==
Festivals and events in Mussoorie reflect the town’s cultural heritage and its role as a major hill tourism destination. Some Local festivals are - Phool Dei, Uttarayani, Summer festival, Autumn festival, etc. The most prominent event is the Mussoorie Winterline Carnival, held annually in December to promote winter tourism and the natural Winter Line phenomenon, featuring cultural programs, music, adventure activities, and community events. The Mussoorie Food Festival, often organised alongside the carnival, highlights traditional Garhwali and Uttarakhand cuisine and local culinary practices. In addition, Mussoorie hosts smaller community gatherings, seasonal celebrations, and religious festivals throughout the year, attracting both residents and tourists.

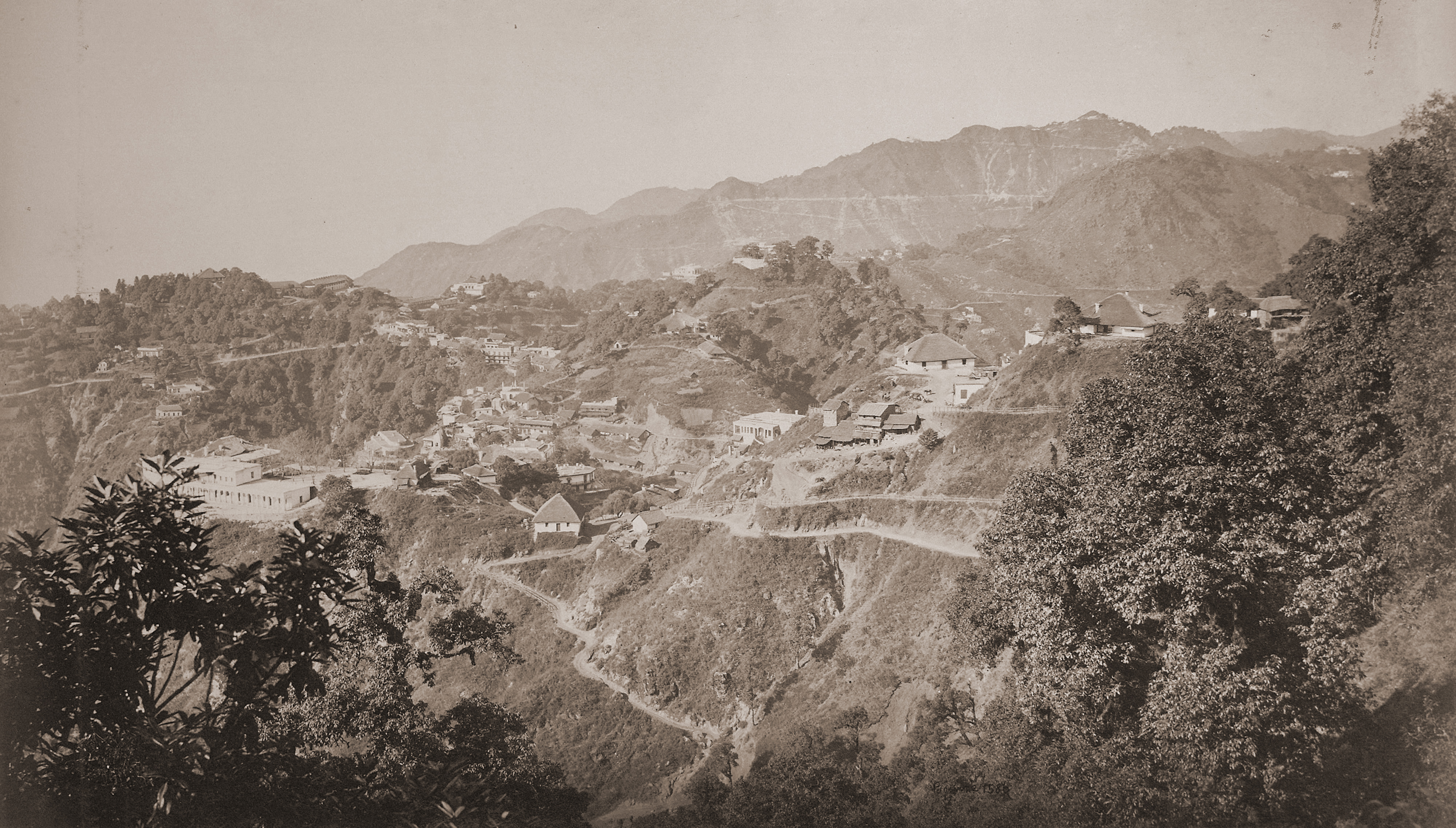
Mussoorie and Landour, 1860s

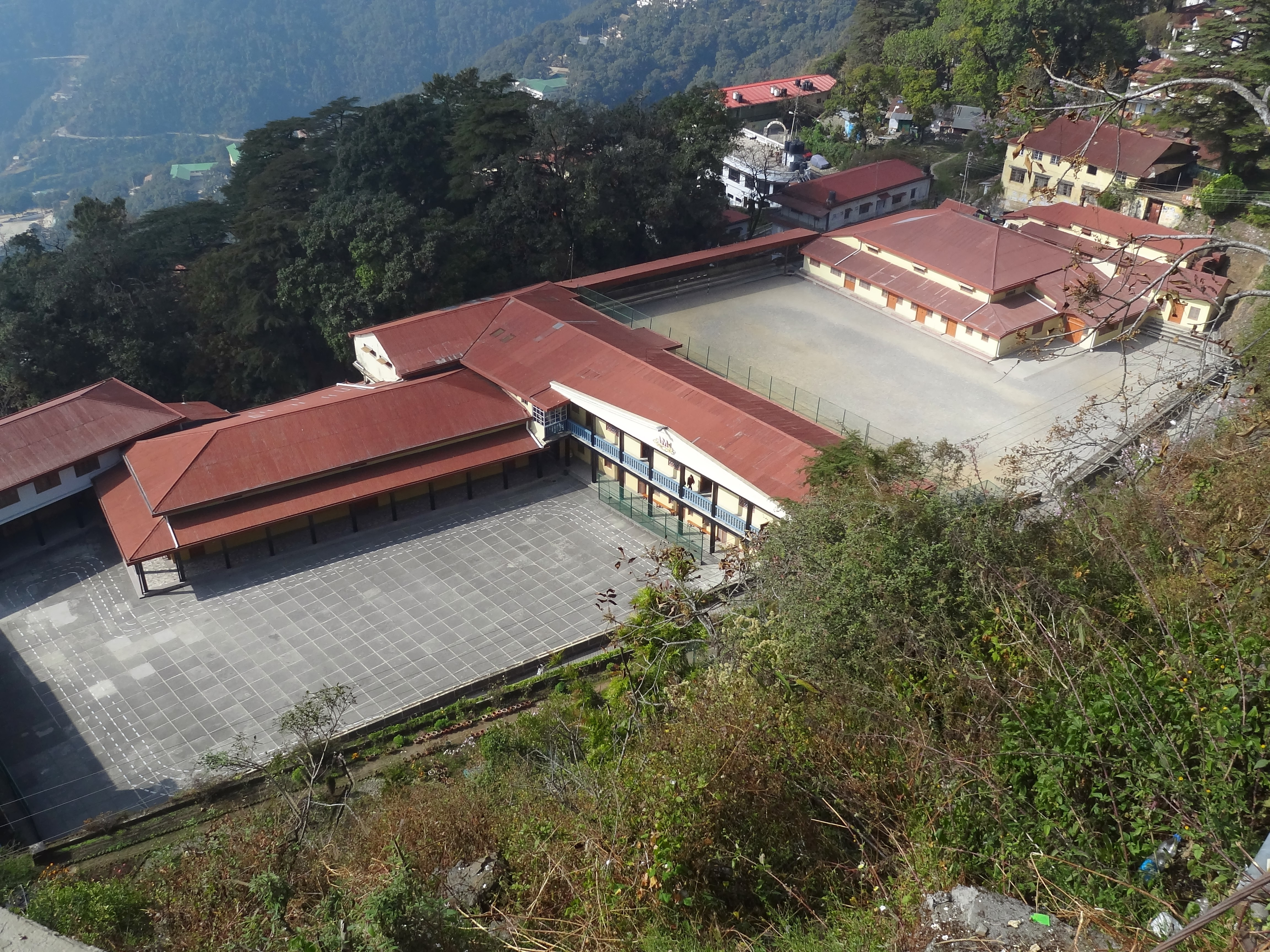
Hampton Court School

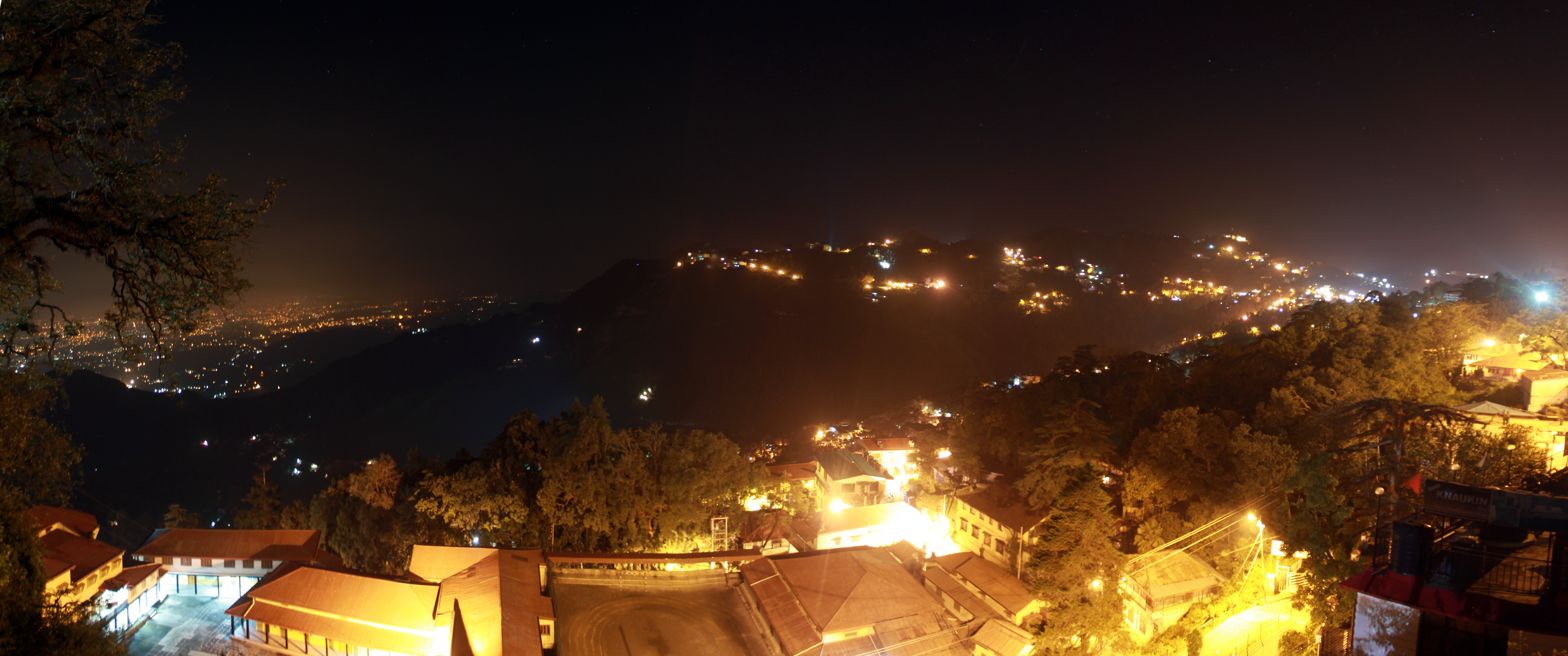
Mussoorie at night

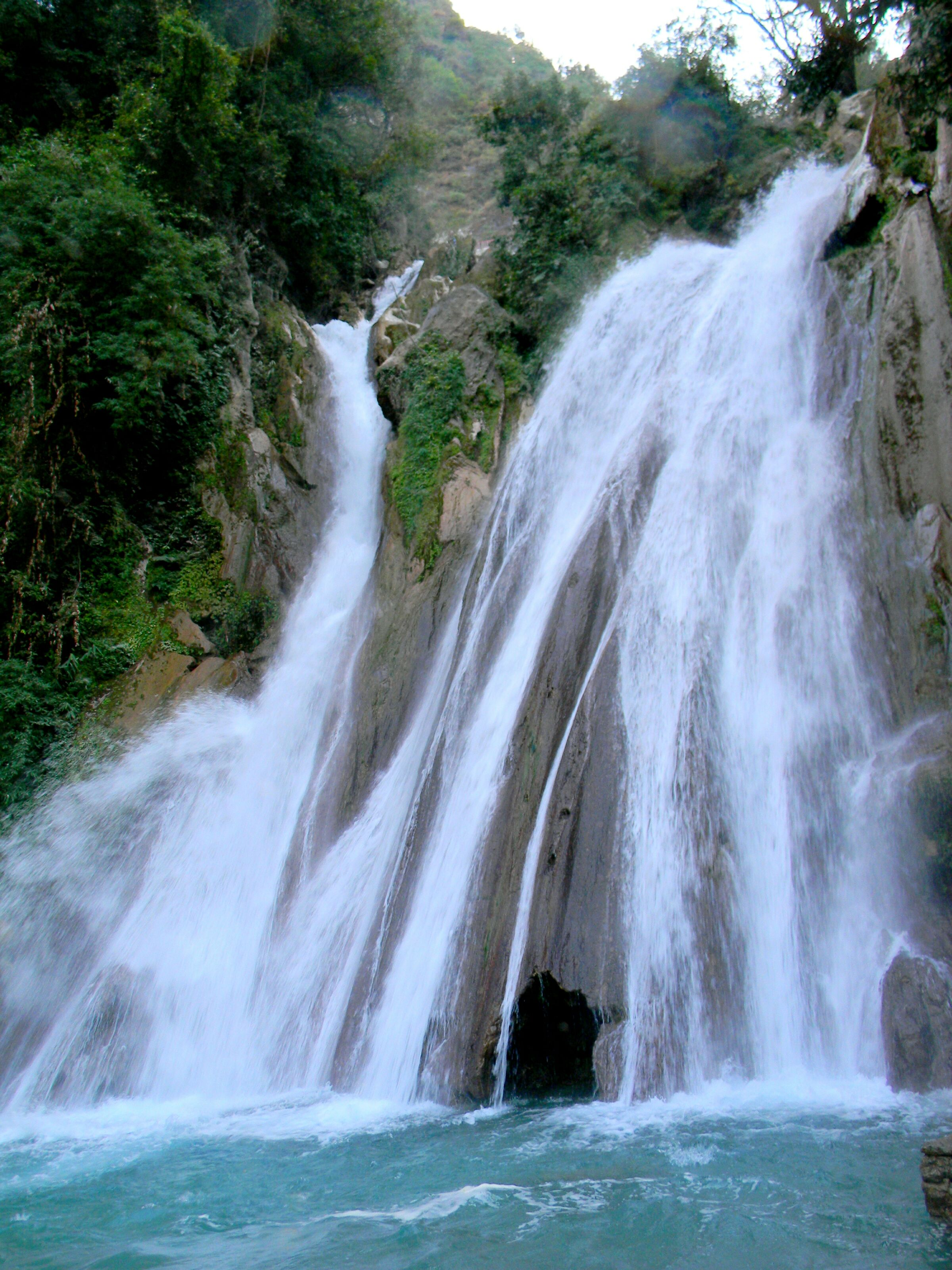
Kempty Waterfall, Mussoorie (in winter)

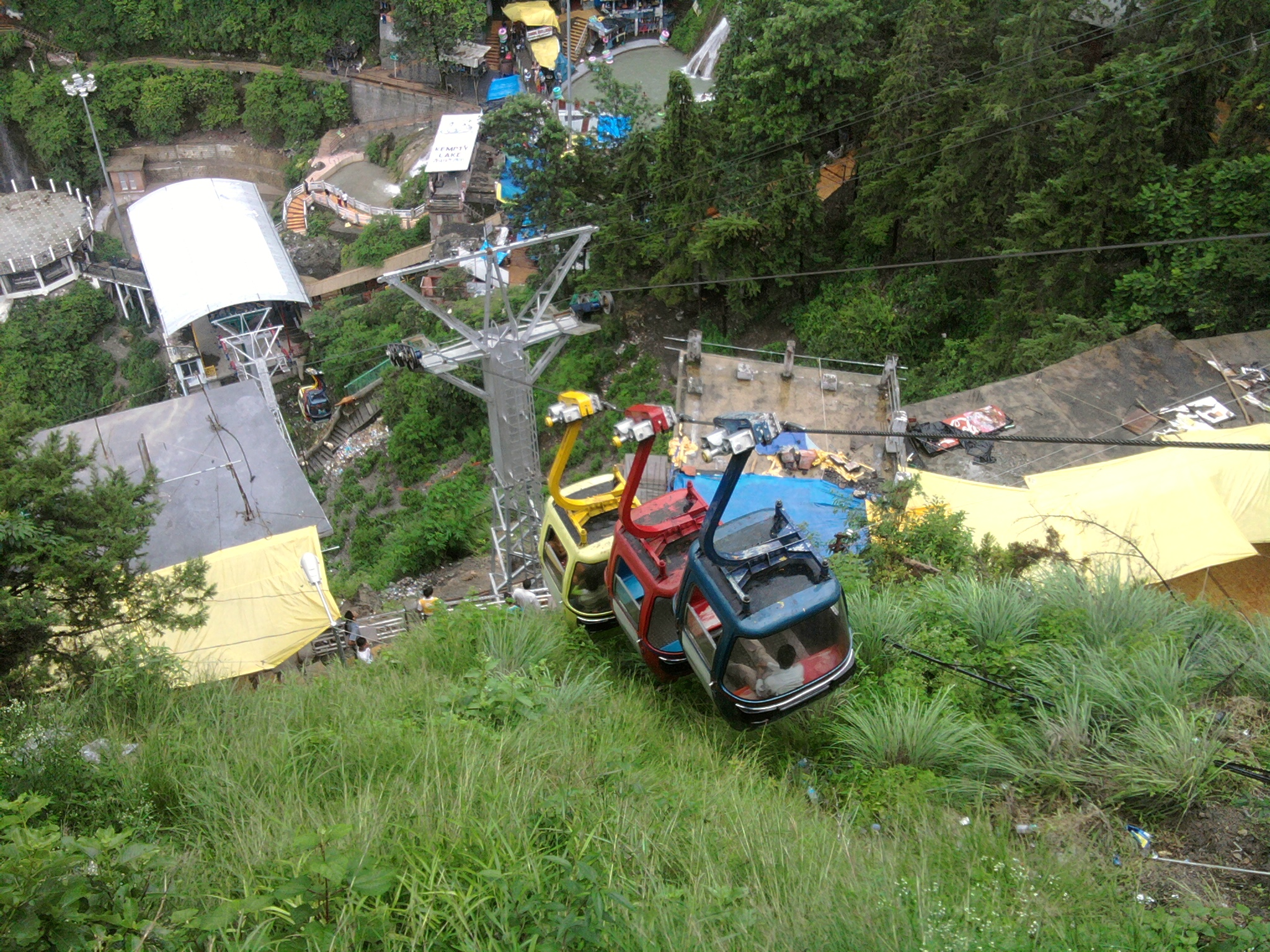
The ropeway/cable car is a tourist attraction in Mussoorie.

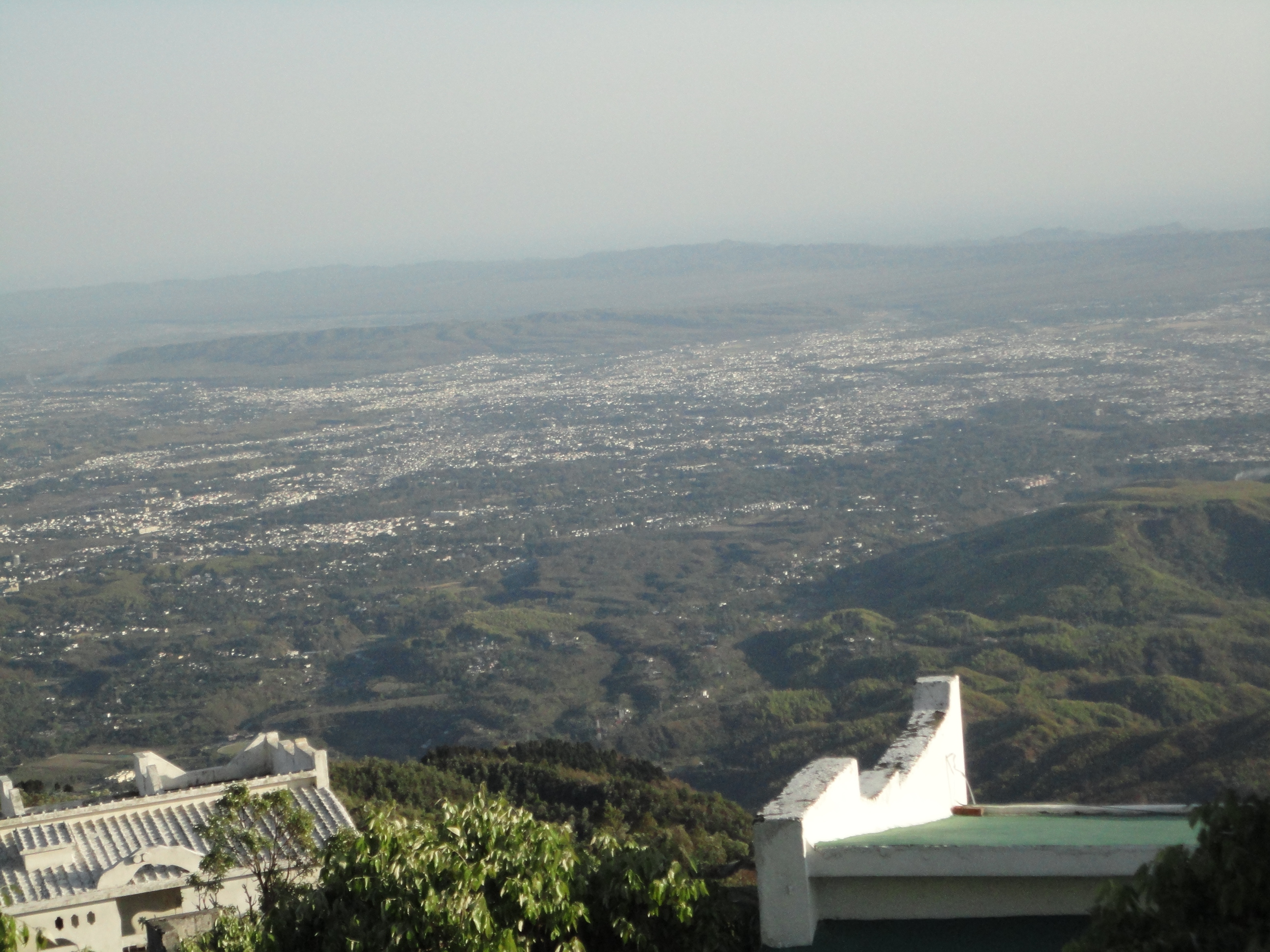
A view of Dehradun from Mussourie

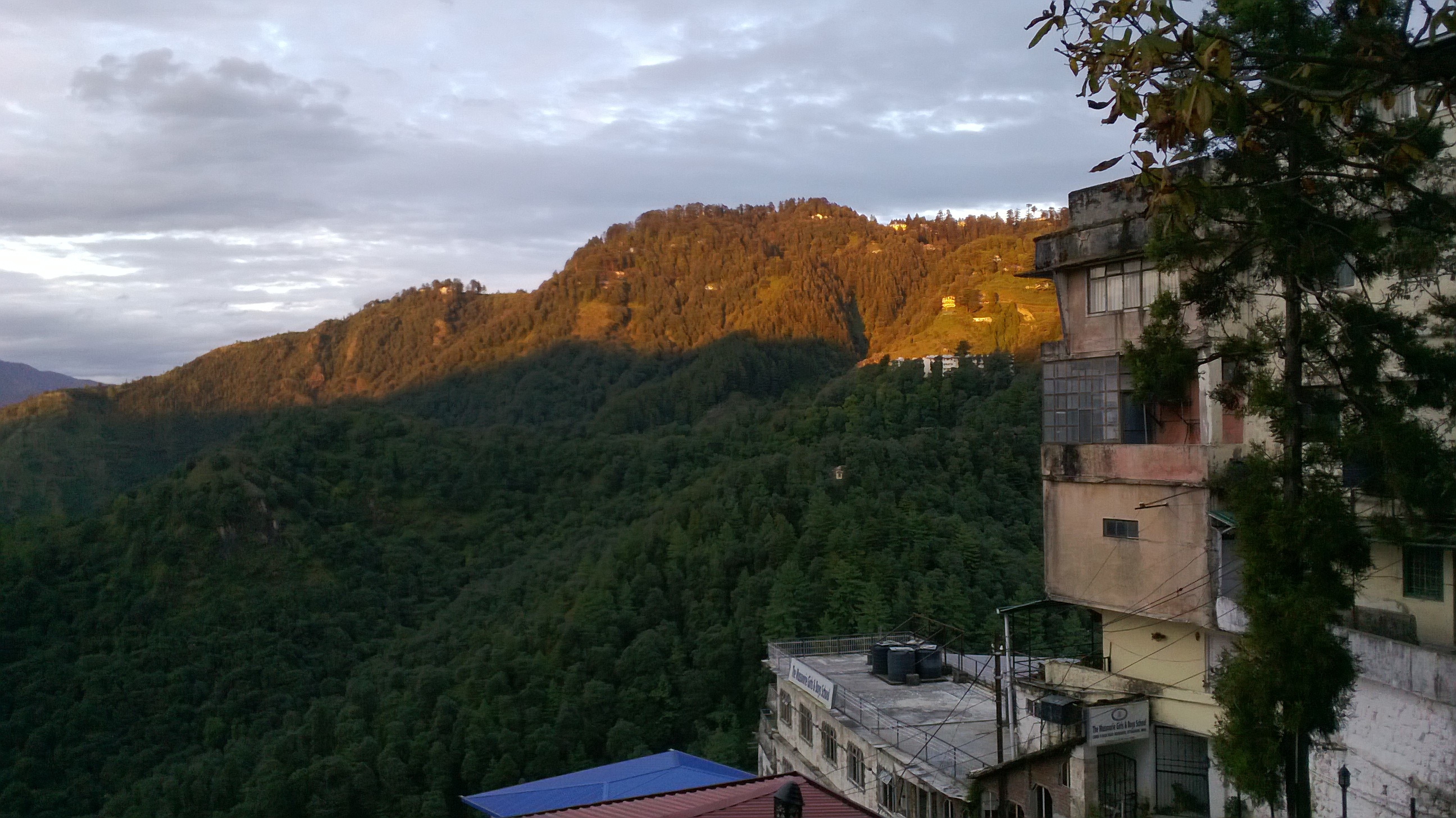
View of the hills in Mussoorie towards sunset

A video of sightseeing while driving on the roads at Mussoorie

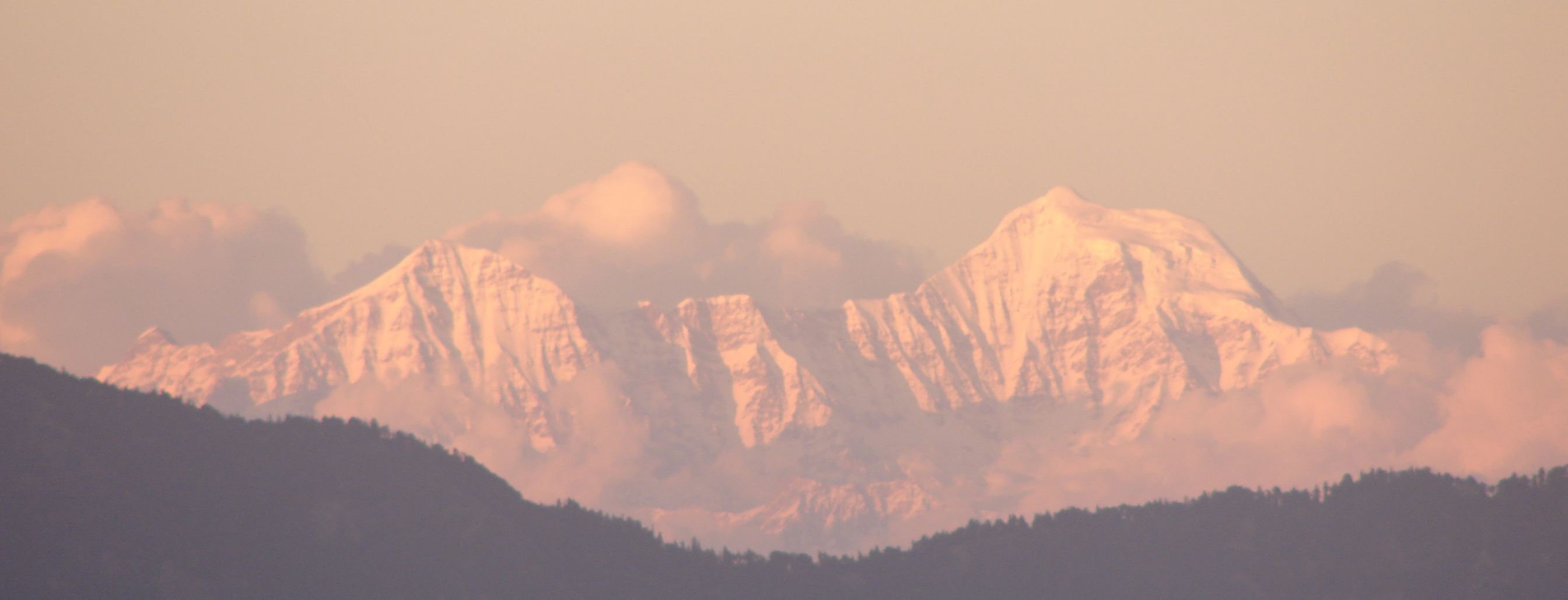
Himalayas at dusk from Mussoorie

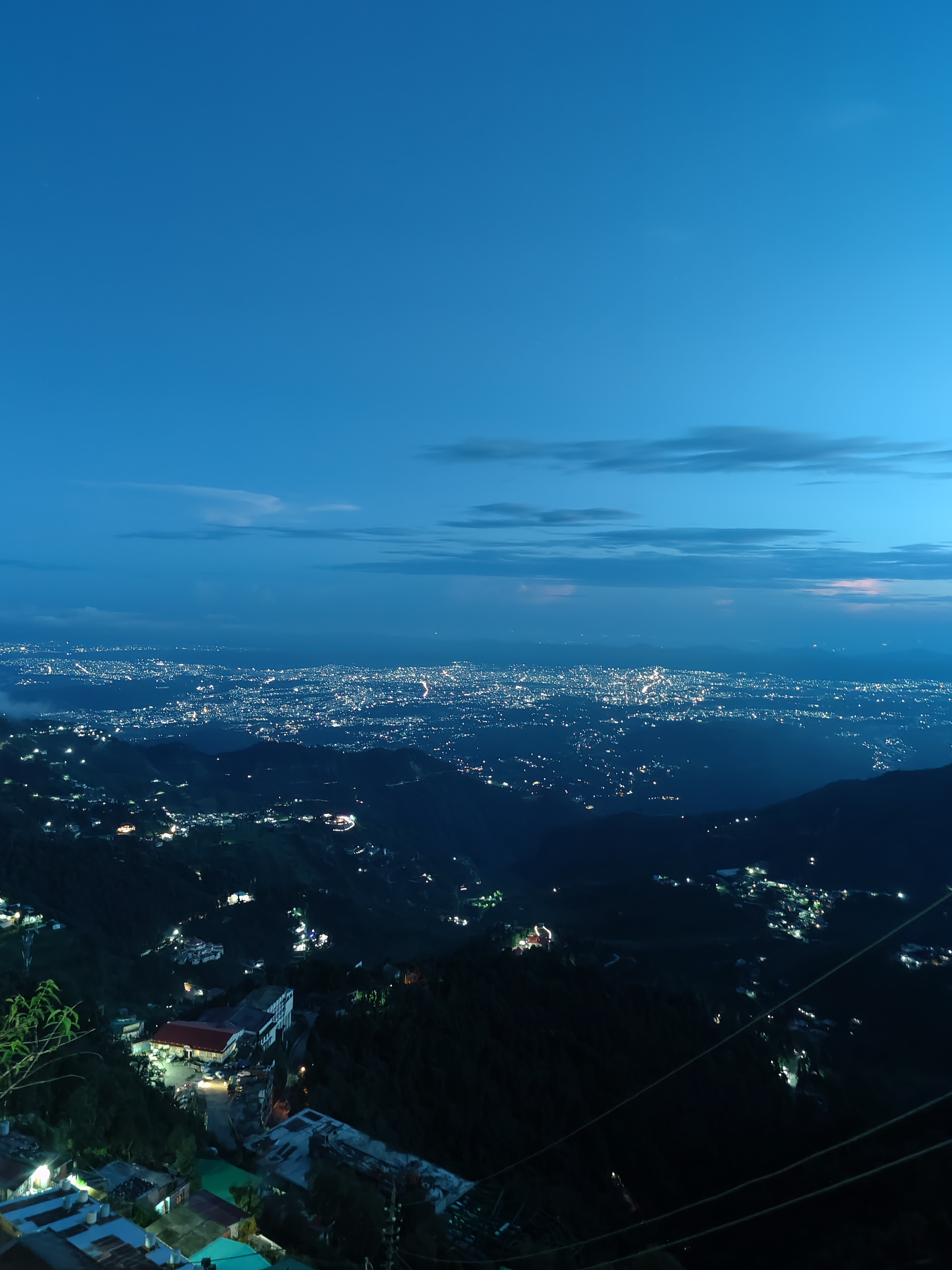
View of Dehradun from Mussoorie at night

== Notable people ==
- Ruskin Bond
- Bill Aitken (writer)
- Tom Alter
- Anita Desai
- Saira Banu
- Jamila Gavin
- Stephen Alter
- Martha Chen
