= Happy Valley, Mussoorie =

- Hill station
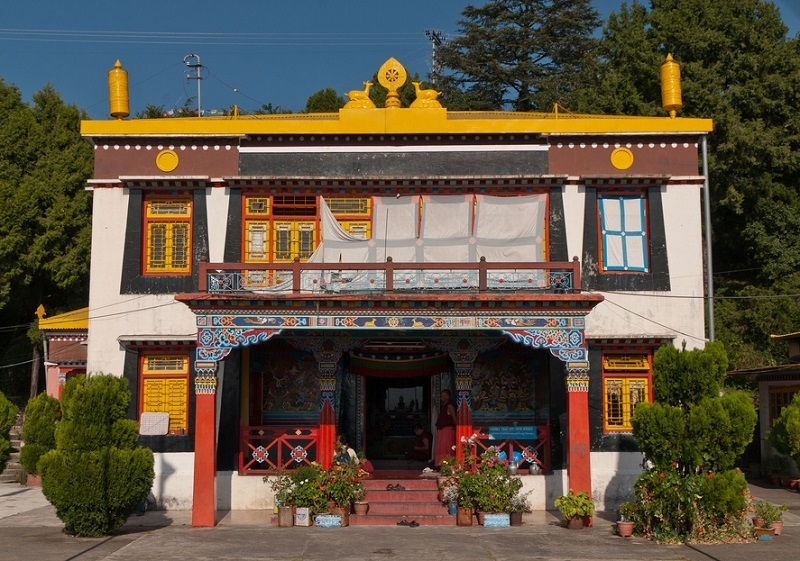
- Shedup Choepelling Temple

- Location in Uttarakhand, India Happy Valley, Mussoorie (India)
- Coordinates: 30.45°N 78.08°E
- Country: India
- State: Uttarakhand
- District: Dehradun
- Time zone: UTC+5:30 (IST)
- PIN: 248179
- Vehicle registration: UK
- Website: uk.gov.in

Happy Valley is an area situated within the hill station of Mussoorie with majority of Tibetans settled in area in Dehradun district, Uttarakhand, India.

== Location ==
Happy Valley is near the Indian Administrative Services Academy - Lal Bahadur Shastri National Academy of Administration. Within the valley is a Tibetan Monastery with a clear view of Hathipaon.

Happy Valley is west of Mussoorie’s Dalai Hill and a popular destination to witness both sunrises and sunsets in the Mussoorie area where the mountain ranges of Jaunpur and Nag-Tibba are visible.

== History ==
On 18 October 1929 Mahatma Gandhi addressed the European municipal councillors at Mussoorie. At that time he stayed at Birla House in Happy Valley.

One of the landmark events in the history of the Tibetan government in exile in India happened in April 1959 when a young Dalai Lama arrived at Happy Valley. In April 1960, he left Happy Valley for another hill town - Dharamshala in Himachal Pradesh with an entourage of eighty officials of the Tibetan government in exile.

Later, this government-in-exile moved to Dharamshala in Himachal Pradesh leaving behind at Happy Valley, a community of Tibetans who have integrated with the life and culture of Mussoorie, but had built a Buddhist Temple and Tibetan-style homes. As of 2016, Happy Valley still was home to about 5000 Tibetan refugees.

== Characteristics ==
Happy Valley has an Indian Administrative Service Academy - The Lal Bahadur Shastri National Academy of Administration. it also has Tibetan Temples and a Municipal Garden. The area of the valley leads to the Cloud's End- a place where the geographical borders of Mussoorie end. The Hathipaon Park Estate is also there. From Happy Valley can be seen the whole of Mussoorie with George Everest's house on one side and the Himalayan ranges on the other.
