= Kempty Falls =

Waterfall in Ram Gaon, Uttarakhand, India

Coordinates: 30°29′14.34″N 78°2′10.34″E

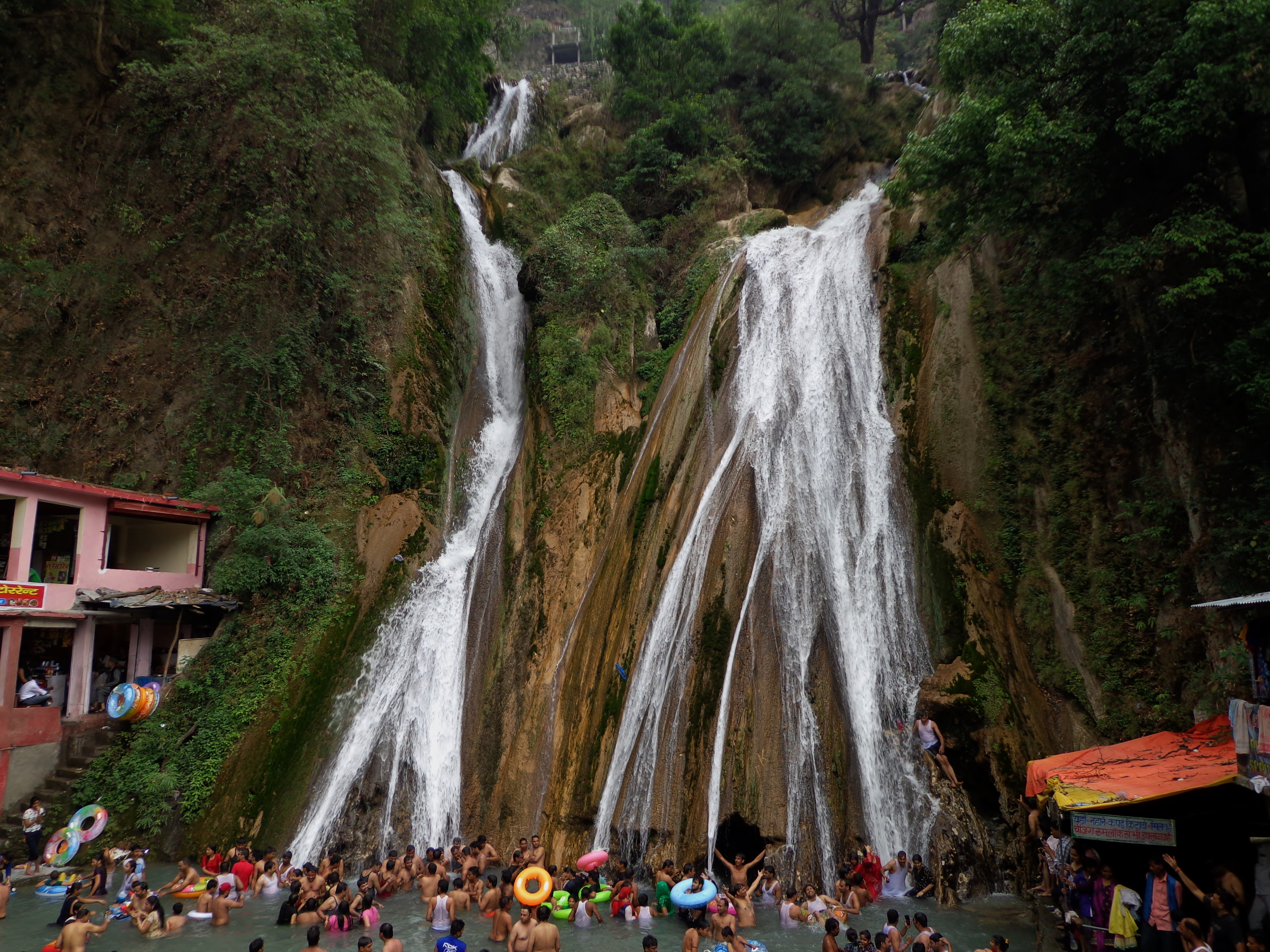
Kempty Falls with visitors

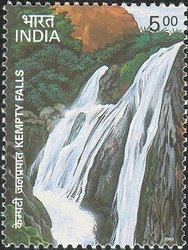
Stamp of India 2003 Waterfalls of India Kempty Falls

Kempty Falls is a waterfall in Ram Gaon and at the south of Kempty, in the Tehri Garhwal District of Uttarakhand, India. It is 13 kilometres (8 mi) from Mussoorie on the Chakrata Road, and 45 kilometres (28 mi) from Dehradun. It is nearly 1364 meters above sea level, at 78°-02’East longitude and 30° -29’North latitude. The Kempty Falls, and the area around is surrounded by high mountain ranges at an altitude of 4500 feet. There is an estimated tourist inflow to the Falls of over 10 lakh (one million).

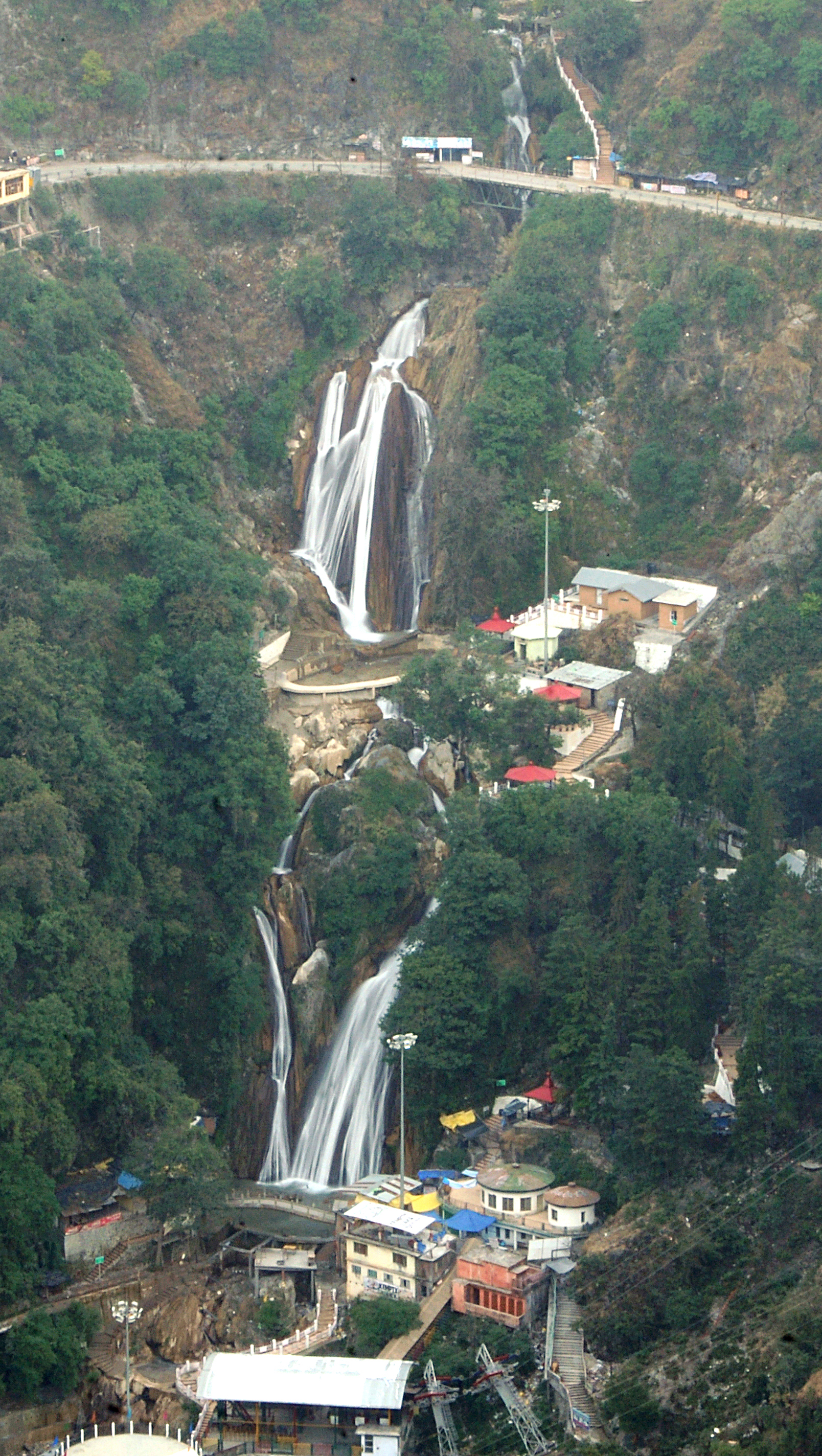
Around Kempty Falls

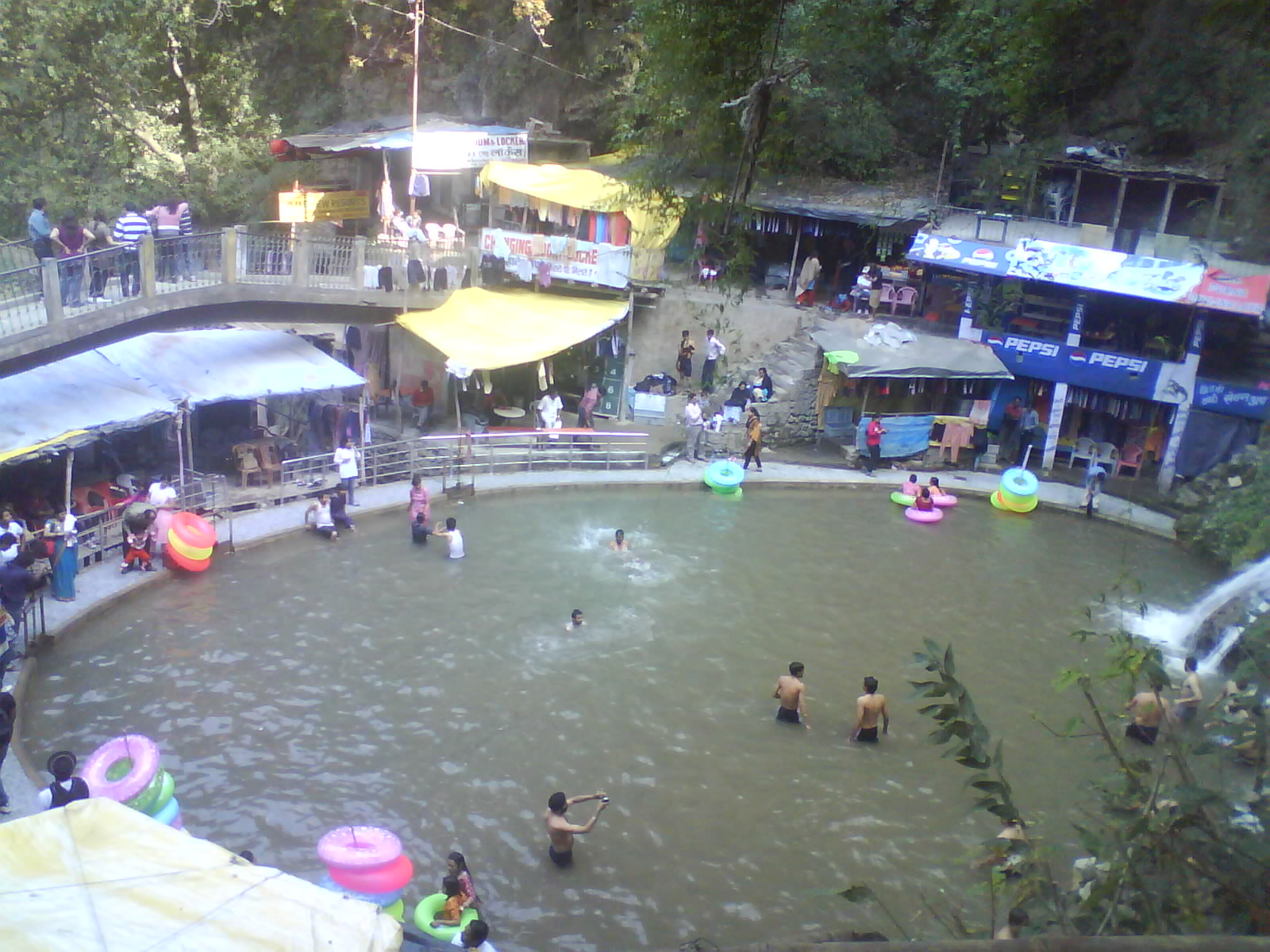
Waterfall basin

Kempty Falls were developed as a prominent tourist destination in Garhwal by British officer John Mekinan, around 1835. The name Kempty is probably derived from the word 'camp-tea'. A stream of water running throughout the year starting from the southwest of the village of Banglow ki kandi moves northwest and falls from 4,500 ft. Splitting into five other cascades, the water falls a further 40 feet.

The nearest medical centres are at Dehradun, Mussoorie and Kempty, the nearest railway station at Dehradun, and the nearest airport the Jolly Grant Airport in Dehradun.

== See also ==
- List of waterfalls
- List of waterfalls in India
