= St. Mary's =

St. Mary's, St. Marys, or St. Maries may be disambiguated as follows:

- Saint Mary (disambiguation)
- St. Mary's Academy (disambiguation)
- Saint Mary's Bay (disambiguation)
- Saint Mary's Cathedral (disambiguation)
- Saint Mary's Cemetery (disambiguation)
- Saint Mary's Church (disambiguation)
- Saint Mary's College (disambiguation)
- St Mary's GAA (disambiguation)
- St. Mary's Hall (disambiguation)
- Saint Mary's Hospital (disambiguation)
- Saint Mary's Island (disambiguation)
- Mount St. Mary's (disambiguation)
- Saint Mary's River (disambiguation)
- St. Mary's Road (disambiguation)
- St. Mary's School (disambiguation)
- Saint Mary's University (disambiguation)

== Australia ==
- St Marys, New South Wales, a suburb of Sydney
  - St Marys railway station, Sydney
  - North St Marys, New South Wales, a suburb of Sydney
- St Marys, South Australia, a suburb of Adelaide
  - St Mary's on the Sturt, the eponymous church
- St Marys, Tasmania, on the east coast of Tasmania
- St. Mary's Hostel (Alice Springs), a hostel for Aboriginal girls at Alice Springs, NT, from 1947 to 1972
- St Marys Saints, an Australian rugby league club

== Canada ==
- St. Mary's Bay, Newfoundland and Labrador, bay on the Avalon Peninsula of Newfoundland and Labrador
- Cape St. Mary's, headland on the Avalon Peninsula of Newfoundland and Labrador
- St. Mary's, Newfoundland and Labrador, in electoral district of Avalon
- Municipality of the District of St. Mary's, a municipal district in Guysborough County, Nova Scotia
- St Mary's River, Nova Scotia
- St. Marys, Ontario

== France ==
- Saintes-Maries-de-la-Mer, a town in the Camargue

== Ireland ==
- St. Mary's, Athlone (civil parish), in the barony of Brawny, County Westmeath
- St. Mary's, Fore, a civil parish in the barony of Fore, County Westmeath

== Jamaica ==
- Saint Mary Parish, Jamaica

== Madagascar ==
- Île Sainte-Marie, an island in Madagascar's Toamasina Province

== Trinidad and Tobago ==
- St. Mary's, Trinidad and Tobago, a community in west-central Trinidad

== United Kingdom ==
- Lady chapel, which may also be known as a "St Mary's"
- St Mary's (Bexley ward), a former electoral ward in Bexley, Greater London
- St Mary's (Chepstow ward), in Monmouthshire, Wales
- St Mary's (Tower Hamlets ward), Greater London, England
- St Mary's (Trafford ward), an electoral ward in Greater Manchester
- St Mary's (Islington ward), a former electoral ward in Islington, Greater London
- St Mary's (Wandsworth ward), Greater London, England
- St Mary's, Devon, part of Plympton, England
- St Mary's, Orkney
- St Mary's, Isles of Scilly, one of the Isles of Scilly
  - St Mary's Airport, Isles of Scilly
- St Mary's, Southampton, a suburb of Southampton, England
  - St Mary's Stadium, the home of Southampton F.C.
- St Mary's College, Crosby, an independent Roman Catholic school in Crosby
- St Mary's Hospital, London
- St Mary's Island (Tyne and Wear), an island near Whitley Bay, Tyne and Wear
  - St Mary's Lighthouse, a lighthouse on the island
- St Mary's railway station (England), a closed railway station in Cambridgeshire
- St Mary's (Whitechapel Road) tube station, a former London Underground station on the District line
- St Mary's Youth F.C., a football club in Northern Ireland

== United States ==
- St. Mary's, Alaska
- St. Mary's, Colorado
- St. Marys, Georgia
- St. Maries, Idaho
- Saint Marys, Franklin County, Indiana
- St. Marys, Kansas
- St. Marys, Ohio
  - Fort St. Mary's, a former fort in St. Marys, Ohio
- St. Mary's County, Maryland
- St. Mary's City, Maryland
- Saint Mary's Street station in Brookline, Massachusetts
- St. Marys, Pennsylvania
- St. Marys, South Dakota
- St. Marys, West Virginia
- St. Mary's Strip, an entertainment district in San Antonio, Texas
- St. Mary's Seahawks, the intercollegiate athletic program of St. Mary's College of Maryland
- Saint Mary's Gaels, the intercollegiate athletic program of Saint Mary's College of California

== Zimbabwe ==
- St Mary's (constituency), electoral district in Zimbabwe

== See also ==
- Sainte-Marie (disambiguation)
- Santa Maria (disambiguation)
