= Ghetto (disambiguation) =

Ghetto refers to a portion of a municipality in which a particular ethnic or racial group lives, often in poor conditions.

Ghetto or The Ghetto may also refer to:

== Songs ==
- "Ghetto" (Akon song), 2004
- "Ghetto" (Kelly Rowland song), 2007
- "Ghetto", by August Alsina from Testimony, 2014
- "Ghetto", by Delaney & Bonnie from The Original Delaney & Bonnie & Friends
- "Ghetto", by Junai Kaden featuring Mumzy Stranger, 2011
- "Ghetto", by P.O.D. from Satellite
- "Ghetto", by Samra, 2019
- "The Ghetto" (Donny Hathaway song), 1969
- "The Ghetto" (Too Short song), 1990

== Other uses ==
- Ghetto (play), a 1984 play by Joshua Sobol, about the Vilna ghetto in World War II
- Ghetto (rapper), now known as Ghetts, British rapper
- Ghetto, a 1997 documentary film by Thomas Imbach

== See also ==
- Gay ghetto or gay village
- Pink ghetto, a term used to refer to jobs dominated by women
- Student ghetto, or student quarter
  - University of Dayton Ghetto
- "In the Ghetto", Elvis song
- Gheddo by Eko Fresh
- Inner city
