= Student quarter =

Residential area that houses mostly students

A student quarter or a student ghetto is a residential area, usually in proximity to a college or university, that houses mostly students. Due to the youth and relative low income of the students, most of the housing is rented, with some cooperatives. Landlords have little incentive to properly maintain the housing stock, since they know that they can always find tenants. Property crimes, sexual assaults, and noise and drug violations are more common in student quarters.

Most modern student ghettos arose from the rise in post-secondary enrollment after World War II. Many colleges and universities became unable to house all their students, while homeowners in adjacent neighborhoods fled from the influx of students. Such neighborhoods often took over from faculty and other affluent (permanent) residents, as the housing stock in these areas deteriorated. Many local governments have worked to control the spread of student ghettos and improve their appearance. Fire safety is a special concern.

== Examples ==
The Cotton District in Starkville, Mississippi is a high-end example of a purpose-built, student residential neighborhood. It was developed by a former university faculty member, who was also elected Starkville's mayor in 2005.

A hybrid of this is the University of Dayton Ghetto in Dayton, Ohio, where the school bought formerly privately owned houses in an adjacent neighborhood to house its upperclassmen. Today, over 95% of the houses in that area are owned by the school.

=== United States ===
- Central/Midtown and Downtown Tuscaloosa in Tuscaloosa, Alabama (University of Alabama)
- Isla Vista, an unincorporated town near Goleta, California (University of California, Santa Barbara)
- North University Park in Los Angeles, California, directly north of the University of Southern California
- Parkmerced in San Francisco, California (San Francisco State University)
- Southside in Berkeley, California (University of California, Berkeley)
- University District in Riverside, California (University of California, Riverside)
- Westwood in Los Angeles, California (University of California, Los Angeles)
- University Hill in Boulder, Colorado (University of Colorado at Boulder)
- Spartan Keyes in San Jose, California (San Jose State University)
- East Cleveland Avenue and North Chapel Street in Newark, Delaware (University of Delaware)
- Portions of Alafaya in Orlando, Florida (University of Central Florida)
- Indian Village and Gaines Street in Tallahassee, Florida (Florida State University and Florida A&M University)
- Portions of NW 13th Street, Main Street, and University Avenue in Gainesville, Florida (University of Florida)
- Home Park in Atlanta, Georgia (Georgia Tech)
- Gentilly Road in Statesboro, Georgia (Georgia Southern University)
- Campustown in Champaign (University of Illinois at Urbana–Champaign)
- Hyde Park in Chicago, Illinois (University of Chicago)
- The Oread Neighborhood of Lawrence, Kansas near the University of Kansas
- Portions of Old Louisville in Louisville, Kentucky (University of Louisville)
- Scotlandville in Baton Rouge, Louisiana (Southern University)
- Allston, Brighton, Mission Hill, Fenway–Kenmore in Boston, Massachusetts (most Boston-based universities, particularly Boston University and Northeastern University)
- Royal Crest Estates in North Andover, Massachusetts (Merrimack College)
- Hobart Lane in Amherst, Massachusetts (University of Massachusetts Amherst and several other area schools)
- Midtown and Riverside in Ypsilanti, Michigan (Eastern Michigan University)
- Cedar Village in East Lansing, Michigan (Michigan State University)
- Cass Corridor in Detroit, Michigan (Wayne State University)
- Vine Neighborhood of Kalamazoo, Michigan near Western Michigan University and Kalamazoo College
- Dinkytown and Stadium Village, in Minneapolis, Minnesota (University of Minnesota)
- North Bottoms in Lincoln, Nebraska (University of Nebraska–Lincoln)
- Main Street and the surrounding areas, the Beau Rivage townhomes, and Campus Crossings apartments of Glassboro, New Jersey. (Rowan University)
- The Sixth Ward, New Brunswick, New Jersey (Rutgers University)
- University Avenue area in Las Cruces, New Mexico (New Mexico State University)
- Collegetown and South Hill in Ithaca, New York (Cornell University and Ithaca College, respectively)
- Pine Hills section of Albany, New York (University at Albany and College of Saint Rose)
- University Heights in Buffalo, New York (University at Buffalo)
- University Hill and University Neighborhood in Syracuse, New York (Syracuse University)
- Morningside Heights, Manhattan in West Side of Upper Manhattan of New York City (Columbia University)
- Briarcliff, Chapel Hill in Chapel Hill, North Carolina (University of North Carolina at Chapel Hill)
- The Mile Square in Oxford, Ohio (Miami University)
- University District in Columbus, Ohio (Ohio State University)
- University of Dayton Ghetto in Dayton, Ohio (University of Dayton)
- West University in Eugene, Oregon (University of Oregon)
- Central and South Oakland in Pittsburgh, Pennsylvania (Carnegie Mellon University, Carlow University, and University of Pittsburgh)
- State College, Pennsylvania (Pennsylvania State University)
- Bonnet Shores in Narragansett, Rhode Island (University of Rhode Island)
- Templetown in Philadelphia, Pennsylvania (Temple University)
- Fort Sanders in Knoxville, Tennessee (University of Tennessee)
- Fort Wood in Chattanooga, Tennessee (University of Tennessee at Chattanooga)
- Northgate in College Station, Texas (Texas A&M University)
- Overton in Lubbock, Texas (Texas Tech University)
- West Campus in Austin, Texas (University of Texas at Austin)
- Buffalo Street area in Farmville, Virginia (Longwood University)
- Oregon Hill in Richmond, Virginia (Virginia Commonwealth University)
- College Hill in Pullman, Washington (Washington State University)
- University District in Seattle, Washington (University of Washington)
- University District in Spokane, Washington (Gonzaga University)
- Sunnyside in Morgantown, West Virginia (West Virginia University)
- Historic Randall Park Neighborhood in Eau Claire, Wisconsin (University of Wisconsin–Eau Claire)
- Bassett, Mansion Hill, and East Johnson Street neighborhoods in Madison, Wisconsin (University of Wisconsin–Madison)
- Upper East Side, Brady St, Riverwest neighborhoods of Milwaukee near University of Wisconsin–Milwaukee

=== Canada ===
- The Annex and Harbord Village in Toronto, Ontario (University of Toronto)
- Kingston Student Ghetto in Kingston, Ontario (Queen's University)
- Sandy Hill in Ottawa, Ontario (University of Ottawa)
- Huron Heights and Argyle neighbourhoods in London, Ontario (Fanshawe College)
- University Heights and Oxford Park in London, Ontario (The University of Western Ontario)
- Ainslie Wood and Westdale in Hamilton, Ontario (McMaster University)
- York University Heights in Toronto, Ontario (York University)
- Northdale in Waterloo, Ontario (University of Waterloo and Wilfrid Laurier University)
- McGill Ghetto, formally known as Milton Parc, in Montreal, Quebec (McGill University)
- Sainte-Foy, Quebec City, Quebec (Laval University, Cégep Garneau and Cégep de Sainte-Foy)
- South End in Halifax, Nova Scotia (Dalhousie University and St. Mary's University)
- College Hill and Forest Hill in Fredericton, New Brunswick (University of New Brunswick)
- Sackville in Tantramar, New Brunswick (Mount Allison University)
- Churchill Park in St. John's, Newfoundland and Labrador (Memorial University of Newfoundland)

=== United Kingdom ===
- Lenton in Nottingham, University of Nottingham UK
- Jesmond in Newcastle upon Tyne (Newcastle University), (Northumbria University), UK
- Heaton in Newcastle upon Tyne (Newcastle University), (Northumbria University), UK
- Burley in Leeds (University of Leeds), (Leeds Metropolitan University), UK
- Hyde Park in Leeds (University of Leeds), (Leeds Metropolitan University), UK
- Headingley in Leeds (University of Leeds), (Leeds Metropolitan University), UK
- Cowley Road in Oxford, UK
- Fallowfield in Manchester (University of Manchester), UK
- Old Aberdeen in Aberdeen (University of Aberdeen)
- Bournbrook in Birmingham (University of Birmingham), UK
- The Holylands, Belfast, near Queens University.
- Cathays in Cardiff, Wales (Cardiff University), (Cardiff Metropolitan University)
- Mill Road in Cambridge, England (Anglia Ruskin University)
- Kensington in Liverpool, England, (University of Liverpool and JMU)
- Wavertree (especially off Smithdown Road) in Liverpool, England (Liverpool Hope University and University of Liverpool)
- St Johns in Worcester (University of Worcester)
- Ecclesall Road in Sheffield (Sheffield Hallam University), (University of Sheffield), UK
- Broomhill in Sheffield (University of Sheffield), UK
- Brynmill in Swansea, Wales (Swansea University)
- Mount Pleasant in Swansea, Wales, (Swansea Metropolitan University/Swansea University)
- Crookesmoor Road in Sheffield (University of Sheffield), UK
- Oadby in Leicester (University of Leicester), UK
- Hales Place in Canterbury (University of Kent), UK
- New Cross in London, (Goldsmiths, University of London), UK
- Redland, Bristol (University of Bristol, University of the West of England)
- Portswood, in Southampton (University of Southampton)
- Stanmore, in Winchester (University of Winchester)
- The Groves (York St John University) and Osbaldwick, Fulford and Layerthorpe (University of York)

=== Hong Kong ===
- Chek Nai Ping
- Tai Po Tsai
- Shek Tong Tsui

=== Elsewhere ===
- WISTA, Berlin (FU Berlin, TU Berlin and HU Berlin)
- Dunedin North and North East Valley, Dunedin, New Zealand (University of Otago and Otago Polytechnic)
- Studentenstadt, Munich, Germany (LMU Munich and Technical University of Munich)
- Olympisches Dorf, Munich, Germany (LMU Munich and Technical University of Munich)
- Ålidhem, Umeå, Sweden (Umeå University and Swedish University of Agricultural Sciences)
- Mount Pleasant, Harare (University of Zimbabwe, Arrupe Jesuit University and Zimbabwe Open University)

== See also ==
- College town
- Town and gown
- Latin Quarter (disambiguation)
