= Flyer Enterprises =

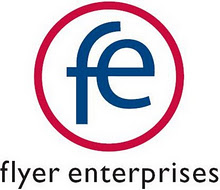
- Industry: Experiential education Restaurant; Coffee; Retail
- Founded: Dayton, Ohio, United States (2001)
- Revenue: $1.3 million
- Net income: $52,000 (in 2010)
- Website: http://www.flyerenterprises.com

Flyer Enterprises is a student-run business organization at the University of Dayton. It operates nine businesses around campus and serves as part of the university's entrepreneurship program, though it does not exclude students with other majors. The entrepreneurship program was recently ranked fifth in the country by Entrepreneur.com and The Princeton Review. The organization is intended both as an educational platform and to provide services to students on campus. Flyer Consulting, a student-run organization that specializes in providing complimentary business solutions to non-profits in the local Dayton community, is also an official branch of Flyer Enterprises.

== FE Business Ventures ==
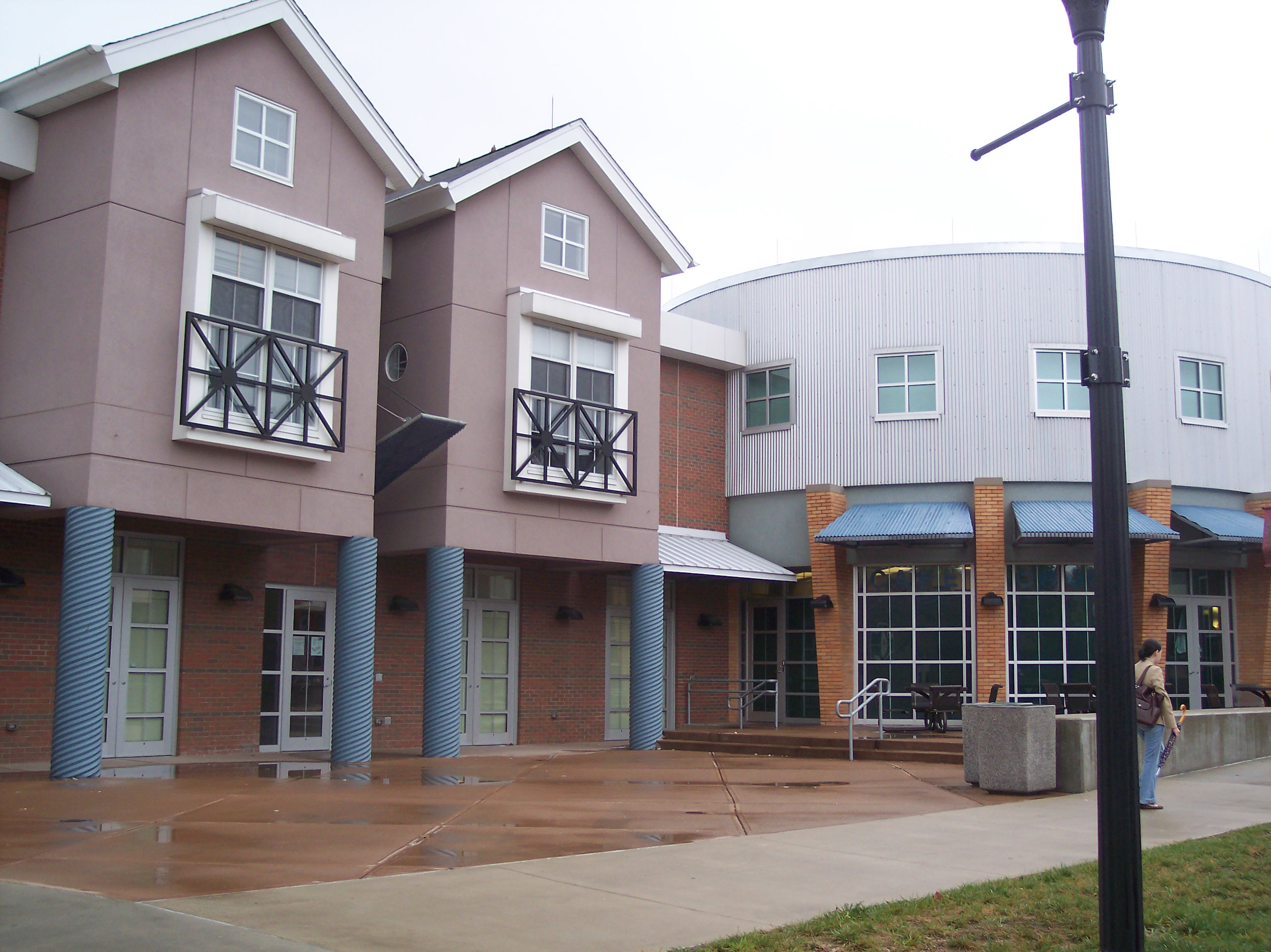
The circular building on the right is the ArtStreet Cafe, a Flyer Enterprises operation at the University of Dayton. The units on the left are housing units that are part of ArtStreet.

Flyer Enterprises currently operates nine businesses around campus.

- The Blend - A gourmet coffee shop located on the ground floor of Roesch Library. The Blend was the first division of Flyer Enterprises which successfully opened on January 21, 2000.
- The Blend Express - A smaller gourmet coffee shop modeled after The Blend's successful operation opened its doors in September of 2002. The Blend Express is located on the first floor of Miriam Hall
- ArtStreet Cafe - Offers breakfast and lunch to students in the Ghetto; hosts an open mic night on Thursdays
- The Chill - A smoothie stand opened inside the university's new RecPlex
- Flyer Spirit - A joint venture with the UD Bookstore opened in 2007 to sell Dayton Flyers apparel and memorabilia
- Fly By - A joint venture with dining services formerly known as "The Galley" in the John F. Kennedy Memorial Union that serves bagel sandwiches
- Stuart's Landing - A newly remodeled convenience store located in Stuart Hall
- FE Catering - A full catering service operation that opened in August 2009 that serves the catering needs of the UD community
- FE Storage - FE's first service-based venture that offers UD students a place to store their belongings over the summer and during the school year

Flyer Enterprises previously operated a large convenience store called Rudy's Fly-Buy. It was closed after 17 years of operation in 2007 because of declining sales. The idea for a student-run store was originally brought to UD from Georgetown University by Dr. William Schuerman, former dean of students and vice president of student development at UD. At Georgetown, the student-run corporation is known as Students of Georgetown, Inc. Originally operated by a small group of students, Rudy's Fly-Buy was taken over by Flyer Enterprises when the organization formed in 2001. Currently, Flyer Enterprises is UD's largest student employer with over 170 employees.
