= St Mary's Roman Catholic Cemetery =

St Mary's Roman Catholic Cemetery may refer to:

- St Mary's Catholic Cemetery, Kensal Green
- St Mary's Roman Catholic Cemetery, Wardley

== See also ==
- Saint Mary's Cemetery (disambiguation)
