= Eric Spina =

President of the University of Dayton

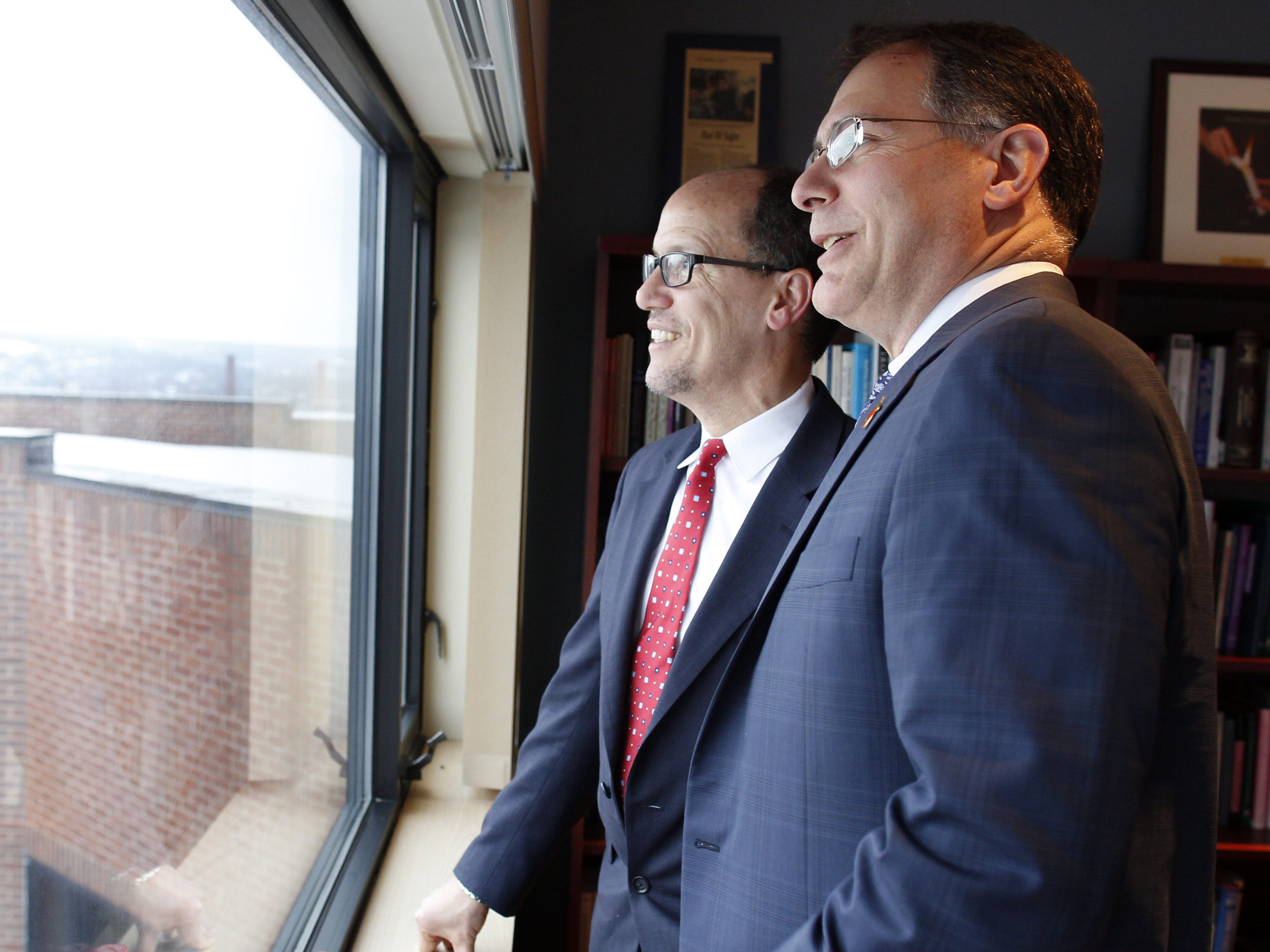
- Eric Spina (right) with Tom Perez on February 19, 2014.

19th President of the University of Dayton
- Incumbent
- Assumed office July 1, 2016
- Preceded by: Daniel J. Curran

Personal details
- Born: Buffalo, New York, U.S.
- Education: Carnegie Mellon University (BS); Princeton University (MS, PhD)
- Scientific career
- Fields: Mechanical engineering
- Workplaces: Syracuse University; University of Dayton
- Thesis: Organized structures in a supersonic turbulent boundary layer (1988)
- Doctoral advisor: A.J. Smits

Eric Francis Spina is an American engineer and academic administrator who has served as president of the University of Dayton since July 1, 2016.

== Early life and education ==
Spina was born and raised in the University Heights district of Buffalo, New York, where he attended Canisius High School. Spina earned his bachelor's degree in mechanical engineering from Carnegie Mellon University, followed by a master's degree and PhD in aerospace engineering from Princeton University.

== Career ==
Spina began his career at Syracuse University, where he was a faculty member in the College of Engineering & Computer Science. He became dean of the department in 2003, and later served as vice chancellor and provost of the university from July 2006. In 2013, Spina served as the interim chancellor and president before Kent Syverud assumed the office. He served as the Trustee Professor prior to the presidency at Dayton.

Spina was selected as the University of Dayton's 19th president in the summer of 2015. He officially took office in July 2016. In 2018, Spina's contract was extended through 2024. Spina has announced his retirement and resignation for June of 2027. On October 12, 2026 it was announced that Spina would be replaced as president by Darlene Weaver.

== Personal life ==
Spina lives in Oakwood with his wife, Karen, their two children, and two dogs.
