= Pine Hills, Albany, New York =

Pine Hills City of Albany
- Neighborhood
- Etymology: for pine covered hilltops in the area
- Location of Pine Hills within the state of New York
- Coordinates: 42°39′57″N 73°47′27″W
- Country: United States
- State: New York
- County: Albany County
- City: Albany
- Settled: Early 19th century
- Time zone: UTC-5 (Eastern Standard Time)
  - Summer (DST): UTC-4 (Eastern Daylight Time)
- Area code: 518
- ZIP code: 12203, 12208

Pine Hills is a neighborhood in Albany, New York, generally defined as the area from Manning Boulevard to the west, Woodlawn Avenue to the south, Lake Avenue to the east, and Washington Avenue to the north. The neighborhood consists mainly of freestanding multi-unit, duplex, and semi-detached houses and is home to Albany High School, the LaSalle school, and the Alumni Quad of the University at Albany. It was the home of The College of St. Rose. Though mostly residential due to historical reasons from its founding, Pine Hills is home to two neighborhood commercial districts (designated C-1 district in 1999); Middle Madison, from Partridge to Quail streets was designated first, and then a latter designated district, Upper Madison, from Main Avenue to North Allen Street. The area of Pine Hills east of Main Avenue and north of Myrtle Avenue is commonly referred to as the student ghetto due to its predominant population of college-age students. The area of Pine Hills west of Main Avenue features many large Queen Anne, Folk Victorian, and Colonial Revival homes. Upper Madison, where it meets Western Avenue near St. Rose is the center of a commercial area, complete with a movie theater, grocery store, fast food strip mall, retail, restaurants, a library, community playhouse, police station, pharmacy, and elementary school.

== History ==
=== Before 1889 ===
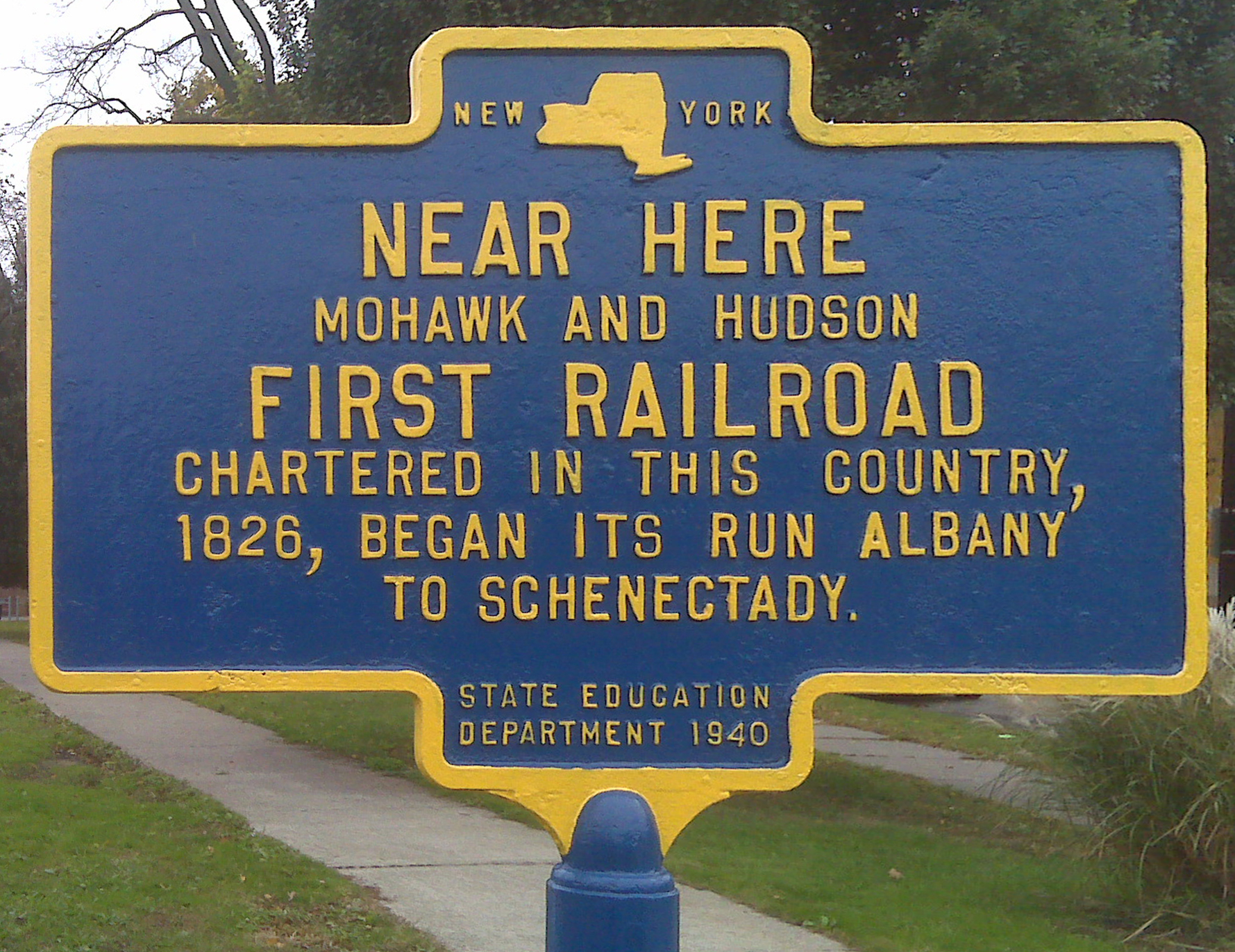
Historical marker at the Point in Pine Hills.

The area of Pine Hills was originally part of the Albany Pine Bush ecological zone full of sand dunes and 150-foot (46 m) tall pine trees that were used for ship's masts. Perhaps the earliest improvement on the land which would later become Pine Hills occurred in 1799 when the Great Western Turnpike was established through the area and connected Albany to the western portions of the state. This route was used by settlers moving west and cattlemen bringing their livestock back east to sell. In 1849 the turnpike was improved as a plank road. Two hotels were built during the 19th century, at West Lawrence Street and Madison Avenue and at Western Avenue and Allen Street.

The first railroad in the state, and the first successful passenger steam locomotive in the United States was the Mohawk and Hudson Railroad, which ran from the intersection of the Western Turnpike and Madison Avenue ("the Point") in the Pine Hills west to Schenectady. This railroad was built in order to complement the Erie Canal, the canal ran for 26 miles (42 km) between Albany and Schenectady, meanwhile the railroad was able to operate in a straight line and cut the distance to 10 miles (16 km).

Due to continuing outbreaks of cholera from 1832 onwards, with increasing cases in 1849 and 1853, the Catholic Bishop of Albany opened the St. Vincent's Male Orphan Asylum to deal with the ever-increasing number of orphans. In 1864 the state of New York passed Laws of 1864 Chapter 434, entitled AN ACT to amend an act entitled "An act to form a separate road district of all that part of the city of Albany lying west of Allen street, and to exempt the same from certain taxes.", banned the city from improving, grading, or opening Madison Ave west from Allen Street to Magazine Street. Allen Street continues to be the western termination of Madison Ave, the street never being opened any further.

The New York Legislature passed a law in 1869 authorizing the creation of a large public park between future Pine Hills and the established settled areas of Albany, and the creation of the Board of Trustees of the Washington Park of the City of Albany (later Commissioners) to organize, plan, and govern the park. The Commissioners were given by the state additional powers to build and maintain approaches to the park and other parks as well, this allowed the commissioners to build a series of boulevards around the city, some of whom would later spur development in Pine Hills. Western Avenue from the northwestern corner of Washington Park to the location of the toll gate of the Western Turnpike was under the purview of the commissioners. Work on the road began in late 1876 included paving it with granite blocks, and was finished the next year. In 1878 Northern Boulevard (today Manning Boulevard) was constructed by the commissioners, it extended from the western end of their jurisdiction on Western Avenue north and east to the intersection of Clinton and Central avenues. Northern Boulevard was planned to encircle the city, but the only section built was the portion in Pine Hills (between 1876 and 1878), Northern Boulevard was renamed Manning Boulevard in honor of Daniel Manning who was a former commissioner of Washington Park and also United States Secretary of the Treasury. In 1896 the state legislature also gave the commissioners authority over Lake Avenue from the park corner at Madison Avenue south to New Scotland Avenue (then- Albany, Schoharie, and Rensselaerville Plank Road).

In 1875, the horsecar line (horse driven predecessor to the streetcar) came to the edge of Pine Hills up Madison Avenue to Quail Street, and by 1886 it reached Partridge Street. In 1890 the horses were replaced with electrified streetcars. Brady Row and Paigeville are two communities that sprang up near Ontario Street on Western and Madison avenues. They mostly consisted of wooden houses for workers at the West Albany railroad shops. In Paigeville the Albany Baptist Missionary Union, comprising all twenty Baptist churches in the city, erected a mission for spreading their faith.

The area between Partridge Street to the east, Main Street to the west, Madison Avenue to the south, and Western Avenue to the north, was "Twickenham" the farm of Andrew E. Brown, and upon his death his heir sold the land off in lots. The land was developed quickly, with eight Queen Anne style detached homes built by 1889 along Madison Avenue.

=== 1869–1980 ===
Gaylord Logan and Lewis Pratt, two Albany lawyers, using a $100,000 bank loan in 1869 to buy the area which later gave birth to the name of Pine Hills. They named the area Pine Hills for the pine forests on hilltops along Western Avenue. The hills were sculptured into terraced lawns, which can still be seen on South Allen Street, where in 1889 tax records describe a "Pine Grove" between 88 and 112 South Allen. The area they had purchased was from Allen Street west to Manning Boulevard and from Cortland Street north to Washington Avenue. Logan and Pratt formed the Albany Land Improvement Company and began selling 50 feet (15 m) by 200 feet (61 m) lots in 1881 after having laid out and paved tree-lined streets along with flagstone sidewalks, and laying water, sewer, and gas mains as well. Homes in the area were constructed by the Sano-Rubin Construction Company and the West End Building Company. These two companies also constructed many other homes throughout the city. Covenants in the deeds "forever prevent the use of the property for business purposes or the sale of intoxicating liquors" which predate the use of zoning in the city of Albany. Originally the lots sold for $1,200, but by 1891 reduced to $840, after the Depression of 1893 the bank foreclosed on the land and sold the lots even cheaper. Beginning in 1886, the West End Building Company constructed 200 homes, and in the early 20th century, the Sano-Rubin Construction Company constructed another 400.

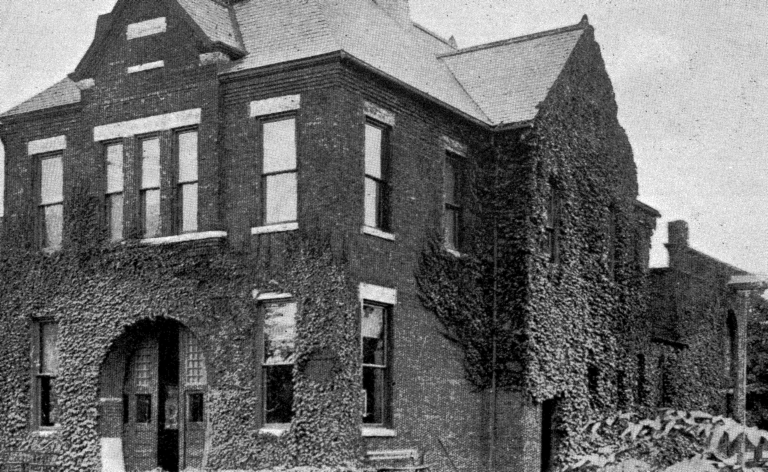
Steamer #10 at the Point in 1891

Even though the original plan for Pine Hills was a fiscal failure for Logan and Pratt, their lots continued to be sold and the area quickly became a fashionable "semi-suburb" with the city beginning to build more infrastructure to service the growing population. The Roman Catholic population of the area established St. Vincent's Church in 1887, and the St Andrew's Episcopal Church was established in 1897. The Point, the site of the first successful railroad in the nation (site abandoned in 1841), became the site of Engine #10 of the Albany Fire Department (AFD) in 1891, and Public School #4 (PS 4) was built on the corner of Madison Avenue and Ontario Street soon after. Starting in 1899 and for the next two decades the Orphan Asylum began an ambitious construction program, resulting in four new buildings that are still used today. Public School #16 (PS 16) was established on North Allen Street near the Point in 1906.

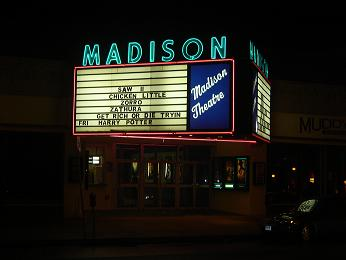
Madison Theater

Logan and Pratt's covenants to keep out commercial activities had a lasting effect on Pine Hills and in the spirit of those who later lived there. In 1900 the Pine Hills Neighborhood Association and in 1902 the Aurania Club (Aurania being the Latin name for Fort Orange, an early name for Albany) were formed to continue in the tradition of keeping Pine Hills a residential area with strong community spirit. The opposition to commercial activity in the neighborhood successfully derailed attempts to build a school for the deaf and dumb in the 1890s and a "hospital for the incurables" in 1902. In 1925 the streetcars began to be replaced by buses, first The United Traction Company, and later in 1970 the Capital District Transportation Authority (CDTA). Meanwhile, some commercial activities were allowed such as the Pine Hills Pharmacy at 1116 Madison Avenue and Johnston and Linsley's Grocery a few years later. In 1929 the Madison Theater was opened in Pine Hills, with Mayor John Boyd Thacher II giving the dedicatory address and Al Jolson as the master of ceremonies.

The Vincentian Institute, a Catholic high school was dedicated in 1917 on the corner of Madison Avenue and Ontario Street, as an elementary school, and opened in 1921 as a high school; in 1920 the College of Saint Rose opened at 979 Madison Avenue, which was also a Catholic institution. In 1928 the Catholic Church opened the Vincentian Institute Child Culture Division, a Kindergarten through 8 school in former greenhouses on Morris Street between Main and Partridge Streets. PS 4 burned down in 1922, but was rebuilt designed by Marcus Reynolds. In 1923 the Orphan Asylum was renamed the La Salle School in honor of Saint John Baptist de la Salle.

In 1926 Dan Winchester entered into real estate with his Winchester Villas, 6 houses constructed between 194 and 176 South Main Avenue. From 1928 to 1930 Winchester began building a subdivision in the area bounded by West Erie Street to the east, South Main Street to the west, and Woodlawn and Hansen avenues to the south and north, respectively. Winchester had wanted his Winchester Gables to be subdivided into 60 lots, but ended up with 55, and only 27 were actually built. Winchester Gables is unique because the houses are in a Spanish-style architecture, predominately stucco with red tile roofs and many have small towers.

In 1927 the 6th Precinct of the Albany Police Department (APD) was formed, with the station located at the Point adjacent to Engine #10 station. PS 16 was expanded in 1930 due to the growing population of Pine Hills. The Alumni Association of the New York State College for Teachers (today the University at Albany, SUNY) purchased land in Pine Hills along Western Avenue for the construction of dormitories for the college. The Alumni Association's successful funding of the first two dorms, Pierce (1935) and Sayles (1941), was the model for the state's creation of the Dormitory Authority of the State of New York (Dormitory Authority). The Dormitory Authority then funded the construction of the other three dorms, Brubacher (1951), Alden (1958), and Waterbury Halls (1959). In 1949 the corner of West Lawrence Street and Western Avenue became the site of the first branch of the Albany Savings Bank, the second savings bank that was chartered in New York (1820), though there have been name changes (to Albank in the 1990s) and acquisitions (to Charter One in 1998, and then to Citizens Bank in 2004) the branch still exists. In 1952 the 6th precinct was renamed Division 1.

PS 4 was demolished in the early 1970s due to structural problems and the land was converted into a public playground. In 1965 the La Salle School became fully accredited as a high school, prior to that students attended either the Vincentian Institute or Christian Brothers Academy. In 1977 the Vincentian Institute closed its doors and was turned into senior apartments and the St Vincent's Community Center.

=== After 1980 ===
The late 1980s and early 1990s were a time of transition for the neighborhood as several long-time institutions moved to new homes. In 1988, the fire station at the Point, Engine #10, was closed and moved out of the neighborhood into a new building near the W. Averell Harriman State Office Building Campus on Brevator Street. The fireman's pole from the station was donated as a prop to Tony LoBianco's Broadway play Hizzoner! A Victorian-style house, owned by the St. Vincent's de Paul church at 1000 Madison Avenue, had housed the Pine Hills branch of the Albany Public Library since 1951. In 1985, the building was bought from the church by the College of St Rose, and in 1989 the library was moved out of the building to a temporary location on campus. After being considered as a new home for the Pine Hills branch of the Albany public library system, Engine #10 was transformed into a community playhouse, while the library was moved into a renovated former New York Telephone building. The former telephone building at 517 Western Avenue is an Art Deco building built in 1930. The Madison Theater was renamed the Norma Jean Madison in 1994, and renovated in 1995 from a one-screen to a five-screen theater with a total of 702 seats.

In 1989 several streets in Pine Hills were changed to one-way streets to improve the flow of traffic. Lancaster Street became westbound between North Main Avenue and North Allen Street, Jay Street became eastbound from North Allen Street to West Lawrence Street, and Hudson Avenue eastbound between North Allen Street and North Main Avenue. In 1998, the 6th Precinct of the APD was renamed Center Station.

In 2003 the Norma Jean Madison was foreclosed on by a bank and closed. The property was eyed by CVS Pharmacy as a potential site to replace the older CVS next door with a modern drive-thru big box store. The plan was opposed by the neighborhood and the city rejected the plan due to zoning concerns regarding building size and parking. In 2005, the theater was purchased and again became a first-run theater. As part of its 1992 Facility Master Plan, the La Salle School performed $13 million worth of renovations and new construction by 2004. In 2005, PS 16 was demolished to make room for a larger modern school, classes were temporarily moved to the former Philip J. Schuyler Elementary School (which in turn was formerly Albany High). The new school was opened in 2007 as Pine Hills Elementary School. 2008 saw the renovation of the Albany Public Library's Pine Hills Branch. In 2011 the neighborhood was dealt a blow with the closing of the Pine Hills station of the United States Postal Service (USPS). Post Office boxes could be transferred to the Stuyvesant Plaza branch in the town of Guilderland, 3 miles (4.8 km) away.

On March 12, 2011, hundreds of individuals, many of which were students from the University at Albany, participated in a riot which involved attempts to overturn cars. Labeled the "Kegs and Eggs" riot, it made national news and exacerbated the relations between the colleges and city in the area labeled the "student ghetto".

== Recreation ==
Pine Hills is home to several parks and recreation centers. Ridgefield Park on Partridge Street has a baseball, softball, soccer fields, tennis courts, a 20-plot community garden, and spray pool. Woodlawn Park, at the corner of Woodlawn Avenue and Partridge Street has ball fields, basketball courts, and a playground. The Madison Avenue Playground, at the corner of Ontario Street and Madison Avenue is a small park that has basketball courts along with a playground. The St Vincent's Community Center has two game rooms with ping pong, pool tables, and board games, a gym used for basketball, volleyball, and whiffleball leagues for children, along with other activities such as jump rope and kickball.

== Transportation ==
Pine Hills is at the intersection of two major thoroughfares in the city of Albany, Madison and Western avenues. Madison Avenue is US Route 20 (US 20) and merges in a Y-intersection with Western Avenue at "the Point", US 20 then continues on the portion of Western Avenue west of the Point. Washington Avenue forms the northern border of the neighborhood, connecting Downtown Albany to the western sections of the city. Those are the major east-west streets, the major north-south streets are Lake, Quail, Partridge, Main, and Manning avenues. The Capital District Transportation Authority (CDTA) runs several bus lines through the area, among the most important are Route 3 (Quail Street), Route 4 (Pine Hills/Corporate Woods), Route 10 (Western Avenue), and Route 12 (Washington Avenue).

== Education ==
Children in Pine Hills attend the Pine Hills Elementary School, K-5, as part of the City School District of Albany. Pine Hills Elementary feeds into Albany's newest middle school, Stephen and Harriet Myers Middle School, for grades 6-8, then on to Albany High. Pine Hills Elementary is located at 51 North Allen Street, only a block away from the Point in the heart of Pine Hills. Albany High School is at the edge of the neighborhood at 700 Washington Avenue, and within walking distance for most of Pine Hills.

The La Salle School, a private Catholic institution, provides education for grades 6 through 12 for youths at risk, along with specialized programs, such as a chemical dependency clinic and juvenile sexual victim/offender services.

The College of Saint Rose, initially founded as a Catholic college for women with a strong emphasis on training teachers, the school today is co-educational with a diverse curriculum. Fully integrated with the surrounding Pine Hills community, the campus contains many formerly residential dwellings converted into campus buildings along with new construction. The majority of the campus is on both sides of Madison and Western avenues between Partridge Street and Main Avenue. Though the University at Albany, SUNY has no educational institutions within Pine Hills, it does have the "Downtown Dorms" of Alumni Quad, in which the College of Saint Rose leases 320 beds in Brubacher Hall.
