= Mary River =

Mary River may refer to:

- Mary River (Northern Territory), Australia
- Mary River (Queensland), Australia
  - Mary River cod, an endangered freshwater fish
  - Mary River turtle, endemic to the Mary River in Queensland
- Mary River (Western Australia), Australia
- Mary River (Nunavut), Canada
  - Mary River Mine, an iron ore mine
- Mary River (Alaska), United States

== See also ==
- Mary River National Park, Northern Territory, Australia
- Mary River Aerodrome, Nunavut, Canada
- Mary (disambiguation)
- Marys River (disambiguation)
- Saint Mary's River (disambiguation)
