= Marys River =

Marys River may refer to:

- Marys River (Illinois)
- Marys River (Nevada)
- Marys River (Oregon)

== See also ==
- St. Mary's River (disambiguation)
- Mary River (disambiguation)
