= Saint Mary's River =

The St. Marys River, St. Mary's River, or St. Mary River may refer to:

== Canada ==
- St. Mary River (British Columbia), tributary of the Kootenay River
- St. Mary's River (Nova Scotia), an important Nova Scotia salmon river

== United States ==
- St. Marys River (Florida–Georgia), forming a portion of the boundary between Georgia and Florida
- St. Marys River (Indiana and Ohio), tributary of the Maumee River
- St. Marys River (Maryland), tributary of the Chesapeake Bay
- Saint Marys River (Virginia), tributary of the South River

== Multi-national ==
- St. Mary River (Alberta–Montana), tributary of the Saskatchewan River in Montana and Alberta
- St. Marys River (Michigan–Ontario), connecting Lake Superior and Lake Huron and forming a portion of the international boundary between the U.S. and Canada

== See also ==
- Mary River (disambiguation)
- Marys River (disambiguation)
- Saint Maries River
- St. Mary's (disambiguation)
