= St. Mary's Hall =

St. Mary's Hall may refer to:

== United Kingdom ==
- St. Mary's Hall, Coventry, England
- Stonyhurst Saint Mary's Hall, preparatory school to Stonyhurst College, Lancashire, England
- St Mary Hall, Oxford, England
- St Mary's Hall, Brighton, girls school founded in 1836 and closed in 2009

== United States ==
- St. Mary's Hall (Georgetown) at Georgetown University, Washington, D.C.
- St. Mary's Hall (San Antonio, Texas), a private school located in San Antonio, Texas
- St. Mary's Hall, University of Dayton, in Dayton, Ohio
- Doane Academy (formerly St. Mary's Hall - Doane Academy), a private school located in Burlington, New Jersey
- Shattuck-Saint Mary's, a private school located in Faribault, Minnesota

== China ==
- St. Mary's Hall, Shanghai, a girls' school in Shanghai related to St. John's University, Shanghai and St. John's University, Taiwan
