= Argonne, South Dakota =

Extinct town in South Dakota, U.S.

Coordinates: 44°04′24″N 97°38′19″W

Argonne is an extinct town located in Miner County, in the U.S. state of South Dakota.

== History ==
Argonne was originally named St. Marys, South Dakota, and under the latter name was laid out in 1886. A post office called Argonne was established in 1920, and remained in operation until 1954. The present name commemorates the Battle of Meuse-Argonne. In 1953, Delbert Gillam, a player for the Argonne Arrows high school basketball team, set a South Dakota state record for the most points scored in a game by a player. Gillam scored 72 points, completing 31 field goals and 10 free throws.

== See also ==
- List of ghost towns in South Dakota
