= University of Dayton =

Private university in Dayton, Ohio, US

- Former names: St. Mary's School for Boys; St. Mary's Institute; St. Mary's College (1878–1920)
- Motto: Pro Deo et Patria (Latin)
- Motto in English: For God and Country
- Type: Private research university
- Established: 1850; 176 years ago
- Religious affiliation: Catholic (Marianist)
- Academic affiliations: ACCU; NAICU; Space-grant
- Endowment: $938.7 million (2025)
- President: Eric Spina
- Provost: Darlene Weaver
- Faculty: 968 (fall 2023)
- Students: 11,378 (fall 2023)
- Undergraduates: 8,192 (fall 2023)
- Postgraduates: 3,186 (fall 2023)
- Location: Dayton, Ohio, United States; 39.740415°N 84.179213°W
- Campus: Urban, 388 acres (1.5 km²)
- Colors: Red and blue
- Nickname: Flyers
- Sporting affiliations: NCAA Division I – A-10; Pioneer Football League; MAAC (Women's golf)
- Mascot: Rudy Flyer
- Website: udayton.edu

The University of Dayton (UD) is a private, Catholic research university in Dayton, Ohio, United States. Founded in 1850 by the Society of Mary, it is one of three Marianist universities in the US and the second-largest private university in Ohio. Its campus is located in southern Dayton and spans 388 acres on both sides of the Great Miami River. The campus is noted for the Immaculate Conception Chapel and the University of Dayton Arena.

As of 2026, the university enrolls students from a variety of religious, ethnic and geographic backgrounds, totaling approximately 10,506 undergraduates and postgraduates combined, making UD the eleventh largest Catholic university in terms of enrollment in the U.S. It offers more than 80 academic programs in the arts, sciences, business, education, health sciences, engineering, and law. In 2009, UD offered what it believes to be one of the first undergraduate degree programs in human rights. It is classified among "R1: Doctoral Universities – Very high research activity".

== History ==
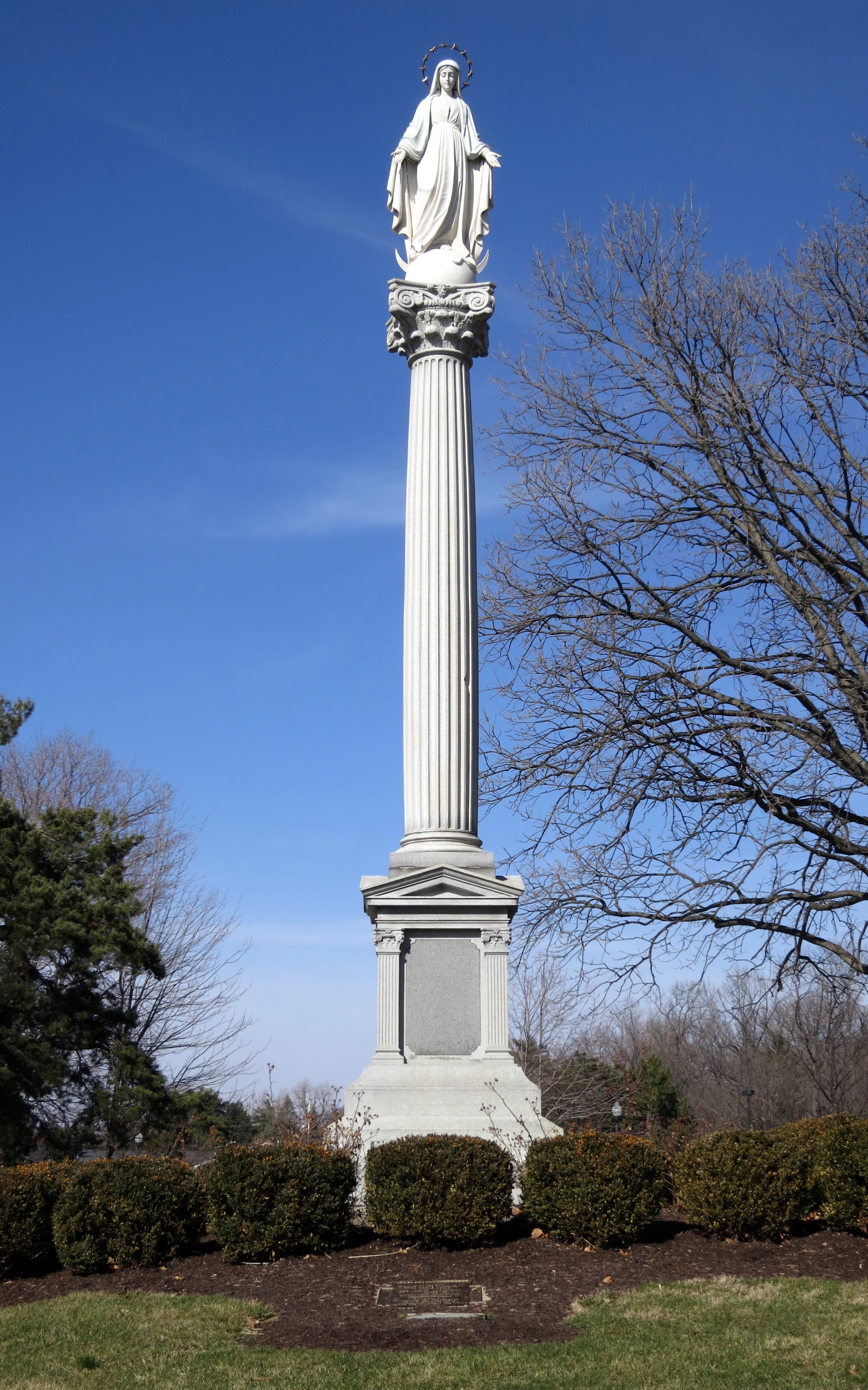
Immaculate Conception Monument

=== Founding ===
In 1849, on a mission to establish a presence for the Society of Mary in America, Leo Meyer journeyed from Alsace in France to Cincinnati. But with a cholera epidemic raging to the north, Bishop John Baptist Purcell of the Cincinnati diocese sent Meyer to Emmanuel parish in Dayton to tend to the sick. In Dayton, Meyer met local farmer John Stuart, who had lost his infant daughter Mary Louisa to cholera the year before. Heartbroken, Stuart and his wife wanted to sell their Dewberry Farm property and return to Europe.

On March 19, 1850, Meyer, joined by three Marianist brothers—teacher Maximin Zehler, cook Charles Schultz, and gardener Andrew Edel—purchased the 125-acre (51 ha) hilltop farm from Stuart and renamed it Nazareth. Stuart accepted a St. Joseph medal and a promise of $12,000 at 6 percent interest. The property included vineyards, an orchard, a mansion, various farm buildings, and the grave of Stuart's daughter, which Meyer promised to maintain.

Just a few months later, the University of Dayton had its beginning on July 1, 1850, when St. Mary's School for Boys opened its doors to 14 primary students from Dayton. In September the first boarding students arrived and classes moved to the mansion. Five years later, the school burned to the ground, but classes resumed within months. By 1860, when Zehler became president, the enrollment was nearly 100 students. The Civil War had little direct effect on the school because most of the students were too young to serve. College preparatory classes started in 1861 along with a novitiate and school for Marianist candidates. The school became Chaminade High School, named after the order's founder William Joseph Chaminade, which has since merged with the all-girls Julienne High school run by the Sisters of Notre Dame de Namur to form the coeducational Chaminade-Julienne High School.

The core of the Historic Campus was built during this time, starting in 1865 with Zehler Hall, the iconic Immaculate Conception Chapel in 1869, and St. Mary's Hall, then the tallest building in Dayton in 1870. In 1882 the university was incorporated and empowered to confer collegiate degrees by the State of Ohio.

=== Key events ===
When floodwaters struck the community during the Great Dayton Flood of 1913, refugees fled to St. Mary's College high on a hill south of downtown Dayton. St. Mary's College was uniquely situated and equipped to provide relief to flood victims. Because students had not returned to campus from Easter break, the college was amply stocked with food and other provisions. Due to its location on the hill, electric light and heating plants were not affected, a plentiful clean water supply was available and the college had other essential facilities such as laundry and infirmary. The college's kitchen provided meals to Miami Valley Hospital and provided 12,000 pounds (5,400 kg) of provisions to St. Elizabeth Hospital. The first night, 400 refugees took shelter at St. Mary's College; by the end of the week, the number had grown to 600. In all, the college assisted 800 refugees. Known at various times as St. Mary's School, St. Mary's Institute and St. Mary's College, the school was incorporated as the University of Dayton in 1920 to reflect its close connection with the city of Dayton as well as to claim an American identity for its Catholic students.

In 1923, the university adopted the "Dayton Flyers" nickname for its athletic teams and adopted a university seal with the motto, "Pro Deo et Patria", Latin for "For God and Country." In the 1930s, women were admitted on an equal basis with men—40 years before most Catholic universities allowed women. The school expanded its science and engineering programs and continued to attract the children and grandchildren of Catholic immigrants.

The growing Catholic presence in Dayton during the 1920s drew the hostility of the Ku Klux Klan, which focused on the university. On December 19, 1923, 12 bombs exploded throughout the campus and an 8-foot (2.4 m) cross was set on fire. Several hundred Klansmen were routed by hundreds of neighborhood residents who joined students in chasing them off.

In June 2014, the University of Dayton announced it would begin divesting coal and fossil fuels from its $670 million investment pool. It is believed to have been the first Catholic university in the nation to take this step.

=== Growth and expansion ===
Starting in the 1960s, the university began acquiring hundreds of single-family homes and duplexes in the neighborhoods adjacent to the campus for student housing, extending the campus to Brown Street. In 2007, the university built five new townhouses and renovated four homes in a Citirama project with the Home Builders Association of Dayton.

In 2005, the university acquired a 49-acre (20 ha) parcel of land for $25 million that had once housed the cash register factory complex of the NCR Corp. The purchase extended the university's boundaries west to the Great Miami River and increased the total acreage to 216 acres.

In 2009, the university announced the purchase of another 115 acres from NCR for $18 million, including the former NCR World Headquarters and Old River Park, the former NCR employees' recreation area, extending the campus to 373 acres. The former NCR world headquarters, renamed the 1700 South Patterson Building, now houses the University of Dayton Research Institute, classrooms, offices, and meeting space.

In 2010, GE Aviation announced it would build the $51 million GE Aviation Dayton Electrical Power Research Lab research and development facility on eight acres of the campus, becoming the first major new development on the former NCR land.

In 2012, the campus totaled approximately 388 acres and included 38 academic, research, athletic, and administrative buildings, five residence halls, 18 student apartment complexes, and 473 residences, including 347 university-owned residences.

Enrollment grew to about 1,000 when World War II broke out. It reached more than 3,500 in 1950 with the return of the veterans and grew steadily. When the baby boomers reached college age, the university's enrollment topped 10,000. However, local enrollment decreased in the 1960s when Wright State University was established and Sinclair Community College was expanded, moving UD toward becoming a national university. In 2012, more than half of the undergraduates were from states other than Ohio. International enrollment has grown as well. In 2012 a record of more than 1,500 international students were enrolled.

=== Marianist tradition ===
The University of Dayton was founded by priests and brothers in the tradition of the Society of Mary and is one of three Marianist universities in the U.S. It is a member of the Association of Marianist Universities and the Association of Catholic Colleges and Universities.

Although the university is not pontifical in character, the academic program of the university's International Marian Research Institute does have pontifical character and is affiliated with the Pontifical Theological Faculty Marianum in Rome.

Vowed Marianists governed the university until 1970, when the charter was amended and lay members joined the board of trustees. Vowed Marinists served as presidents through 2002, when Daniel J. Curran became the university's 18th president and first lay leader. Eric F. Spina, PhD, succeeded Dr. Curran in 2016 as the 19th president of the university.

To sustain the Marianist identity and values of the university, Marianist Educational Associates was established in 2005 to educate lay leaders so the beliefs and traditions at the foundation of the Marianist educational philosophy could continue.

=== Presidents ===
1. Leo Meyer (1850–1857)
2. John B. Stintzi, S.M. (1857–1860)
3. Maximin Zehler, S.M. (1860–1876)
4. Francis E. Feith, S.M. (1876–1879)
5. George Meyer, S.M. (1879–1887)
6. John Harks, S.M. (1887–1889)
7. Joseph Weckesser, S.M. (1889–1896)
8. Charles Eichner, S.M. (1896–1902)
9. Louis A. Tragesser, S.M. (1902–1908)
10. Bernard P. O'Reilly, S.M. (1908–1918; 1923–1932)
11. Joseph A. Tetzlaff, S.M. (1918–1923)
12. Walter C. Tredtin, S.M. (1932–1938)
13. John A. Elbert, S.M. (1938–1944)
14. George J. Renneker, S.M. (1944–1953)
15. Andrew L. Seebold, S.M. (1953–1959)
16. Raymond A. Roesch, S.M. (1959–1979)
17. Raymond Fitz, S.M. (1979–2002)
18. Daniel J. Curran (2002–2016)
19. Eric F. Spina (2016– )

== Campus ==
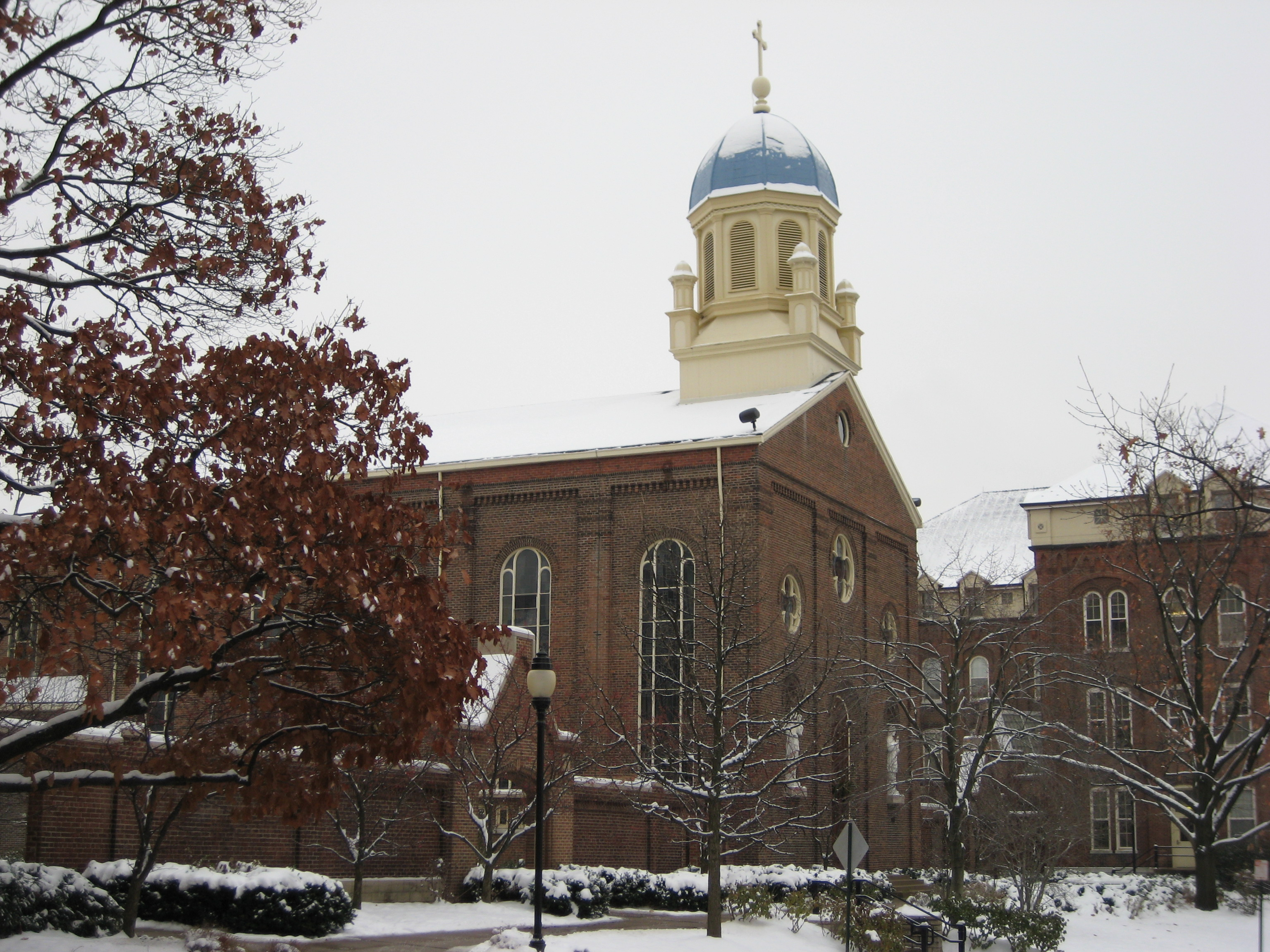
Immaculate Conception Chapel

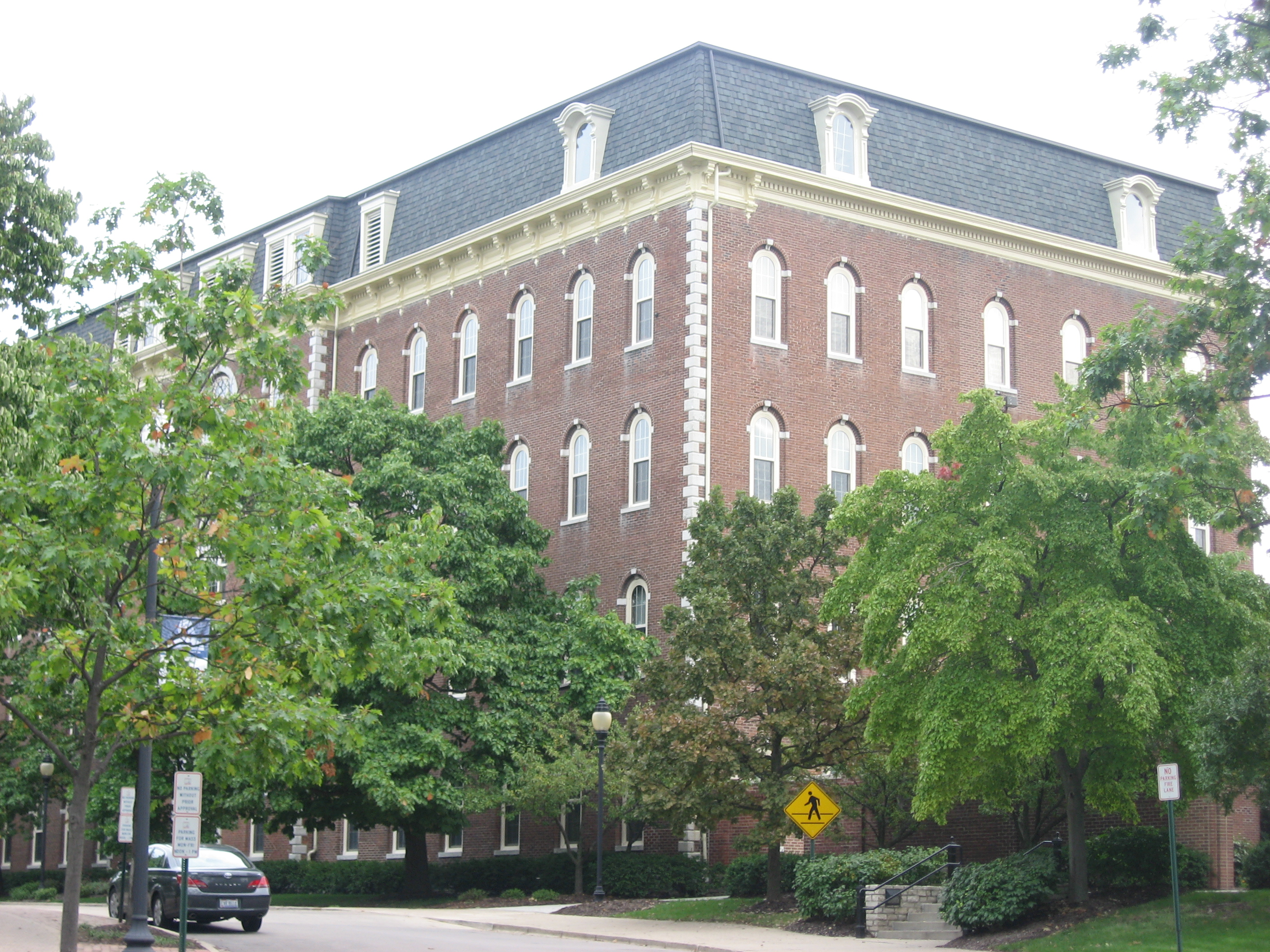
St. Mary's Hall

The University of Dayton's campus is located on approximately 388 acres (157 ha) on the southern border of the city of Dayton. It is divided into four sections: Historic Campus, Campus West, River Campus, and Arena Sports Complex. The campus includes 38 academic, research, athletic, and administrative buildings; five residence halls; 18 student apartment complexes; and 473 houses (347 of which are owned by the university).

=== Historic campus ===
At the center of campus are St. Mary's Hall and the Immaculate Conception Chapel, whose blue cupola inspired the university's logo. In its early years, St. Mary's served as a dormitory and classroom; today, it holds the offices of the bursar, human resources, president, provost, and services for current students such as financial aid, registration, student employment, and veterans services.

St. Joseph Hall was built in 1884 as a residence hall. The interior was destroyed in a fire in 1987 and reopened in 1989. It houses the classrooms and offices for the social sciences and the university's Fitz Center for Leadership in Community.

Chaminade Hall, built in 1904, was named for William Joseph Chaminade, the founder of the Society of Mary. Chaminade Hall originally quartered senior students, and most recently housed the teacher education program before several years of vacancy which concluded with its demolition in the summer of 2025. The University of Dayton demolished this historic structure to create green space where it once stood. The university will continue to honor the memory of Chaminade by naming any future structures in this space after him.

Kettering Labs is home to the School of Engineering. Named after engineer and inventor Eugene Kettering, it includes classrooms, labs, offices, a machine shop, a wind tunnel, and the Innovation Center.

The Jesse Philips Humanities Center was built in 1993 and named for former university trustee Jesse Philips. It houses academic departments including American studies, English, history, languages, philosophy, and religious studies. It contains 20 classrooms, two computer centers, an international language lab, and a 180-seat recital hall.

Miriam Hall is home to the School of Business Administration and contains team-teaching, labs and seminar classrooms, including the Davis Center for Portfolio Management, the Crotty Center for Entrepreneurial Leadership, and the Hanley Trading Center. Miriam Hall is named for Dayton philanthropist Miriam Rosenthal, who played an important role in fundraising for the university.

The Science Center (the joint name for Sherman Hall, Wohlleben Hall, and a connecting central atrium) is home to the math, biology, physics, chemistry, geology, and pre-medicine departments. This building includes classrooms, laboratories, offices, and auditoriums. Sherman and Wohlleben Halls were independent buildings until renovations in 2003 connected them with an atrium and study space.

Keller Hall opened in 1997 and is home to the University of Dayton School of Law. It has classrooms, offices, courtrooms, and a law library.

The John F. Kennedy Memorial Student Union (known as the Kennedy Union) is a popular gathering place for students. It houses a full-service dining facility, coffee shop, snack shop, and the Hangar—a games room with bowling lanes, pool tables, and video arcade. It also houses a copy center, travel agency, box office, meeting spaces, and the Boll Theatre.

The Central Mall is seven acres of green space at the heart of campus, surrounded by several academic and residential buildings. Renovation was completed in 2010.

The Roesch Library houses the university's main library, the Marian Library (which has the world's largest collection of materials on Mary, the mother of Jesus), and the Ryan C. Harris Learning Teaching Center that includes team meeting spaces, distance learning and a student-run coffee shop. The print and electronic collections in Roesch Library include more than 1.3 million books and 69,000 journals.

The RecPlex opened in 2006. The 125,000-square-foot (11,600 m^{2}) building's amenities include aerobics and cardiovascular rooms, a climbing wall, courts for basketball, floor hockey, lacrosse, racquetball, tennis and volleyball; an eight-lane swimming pool, indoor track, weight room, locker room, and lounge.

The Frericks Center has a 5,000-seat gym and was once known as the Fieldhouse prior to the construction of the University of Dayton Arena. It is now also home to the university's women's volleyball team.

The Cronin Athletics Center is used by all 17 Dayton Flyer intercollegiate sports programs. It recently underwent a $2.375 million renovation for larger offices, team meeting rooms, and indoor practice space for basketball, football, track and field, tennis, soccer, baseball, and softball.

Stuart Field was updated in 2011 with a synthetic turf to accommodate intramural and club sports.

Raymond L. Fitz Hall, previously named the College Park Center, was originally owned by NCR, but bought by Dayton around 2005. Raymond L. Fitz Hall is home to numerous University departments, programs, and offices. These include: the Department of Art and Design, art gallery space, Brown Street Bistro, Center for Catholic Education, Central Receiving, Curriculum Materials Center, Dayton Early College Academy, Department of Physical Therapy, Facilities Management, Institute for Technology-Enhanced Learning, Mailing Services, Department of Music, Parking Services, Master of Physician Assistant Practice program, Department of Public Safety, School of Education and Health Sciences, Theatre, Dance, and Performance Technology Program, UDit Collaboration Center and Upward Bound.

The Shroyer Park Center research building is located on nine acres of land approximately one mile east of the core campus.

Jessie S. Hathcock Hall houses the computer science program was completed in 2021 and named in honor of Jessie Scott Hathcock, the first African-American woman to graduate from the university.

=== Campus West ===
In 2005, the University of Dayton purchased land and buildings adjacent to the western border of the historic campus. The $25 million purchase from NCR Corp. added 49 acres and increased the campus size nearly 25 percent.

Raymond L. Fitz Hall (formerly known as College Park Center) is the primary building on this section of campus. It houses a variety of campus offices and academic departments including UD Department of Public Safety (Police Department, Parking Services, and Student Volunteer Rescue Squad), facilities department; music and theater; visual arts; doctor of physical therapy; Dayton Early College Academy (DECA) charter school; physician assistant program; research labs; and the School of Education and Health Sciences.

The Graul Tennis Complex was completed in 2010 and features six regulation tennis courts, bleacher seating, restrooms, and changing facilities.

GE Aviation broke ground on a $51 million, 120,000-square-foot (11,000 m^{2}) research facility in 2011 on the western edge of Campus West. The Electrical Power Integrated Systems Research and Development Center (EPISCENTER) opened in early 2014. The university's researchers work with GE to develop and deploy computer modeling, simulation and analysis of advanced, dynamic electric power systems design, and controls. The center is directed at several markets including end-to-end electrical power starter/ generation, conversion, distribution, and load technologies for civil and military aerospace applications.

Emerson Climate Technologies, a business of Emerson, announced its intent in 2014 to move forward with plans to build and support an innovation center at the University of Dayton to advance research and education for the global heating, ventilation, air conditioning and refrigeration (HVACR) industry. The center is located at the corner of Main and Stewart streets on nearly five acres of university-owned land. The campus also includes several acres of undeveloped property.

=== River Campus ===
At the end of 2009, the university added 115 acres (47 ha) to campus when it purchased NCR Corp's former world headquarters, which included a 455,000-square-foot (42,300 m^{2}) building, 1,600-space parking lot, and a 48-acre (19 ha) park and nature preserve. The former HQ and 115 acres (0.47 km^{2}) came under acquisition of the University of Dayton at a purchase price of $18 million.

The principal structure, Daniel J. Curran Place, located at 1700 S. Patterson Boulevard Dayton, OH 45409 ("Curran Place"), headquarters the University of Dayton Research Institute and houses the Center for Leadership, classrooms used by Master of Business Administration, School of Education, and Health Sciences programs, the Osher Lifelong Learning Institute, and the Alumni Center, among other offices.

=== Arena Sports Complex ===
The University of Dayton Sports Complex is located on the western edge of the campus, west of the Great Miami River and east of Interstate 75. It includes the University of Dayton Arena, with a seating capacity of 13,409, fields for men's baseball and women's softball, and Welcome Stadium, an 11,000-seat multi-purpose stadium owned by Dayton Public Schools that includes a football field and track used by all Dayton public high schools as well as the Dayton Flyers football team.

== Academics ==
The University of Dayton comprises five academic divisions:

- College of Arts and Sciences
- School of Business Administration
- School of Education and Health Sciences
- School of Engineering
- School of Law

The College of Arts and Sciences is the largest of the five academic units, with more than 50 undergraduate and graduate degree programs in 18 departments. The university established one of the first undergraduate human rights studies program in the nation in 1998. Specialized institutes and centers provide in-depth opportunities for study, research and service in three areas. The Fitz Center for Leadership in Community emphasizes community building and outreach to urban neighborhoods and larger communities. The Institute for Pastoral Initiatives focuses on trends and developments in pastoral ministries for lay and vowed Catholics and offers online adult religious education to parishes around the world through the Virtual Learning Community for Faith Formation. The Center for Tissue Regeneration and Engineering at Dayton (TREND) conducts research in the areas of tissue regeneration and bioengineering with special interests in eye, bone and ear regeneration and engineering.

The School of Education and Health Sciences offers undergraduate and graduate education programs, online and in the classroom, ranging from early childhood to higher education. The school also is home to the Center for Catholic Education. The Lalanne Program is within the center and is a post-graduate teacher service program, specializing in supporting beginning Catholic school educators by combining service and teaching. Lalanne teachers make a two-year commitment to teach in an under-resourced Catholic school, live together in a faith-based community, and pursue professional and spiritual/personal development. The University of Dayton's SEHS began offering a Doctor of Education program in 2019.

The School of Engineering offers eight undergraduate degree programs, 14 master's programs, and five Ph.D. programs. Students in the school have the opportunity to perform research in one of the school's 10 centers.

Flyer Enterprises manages a variety of on-campus businesses and is the sixth-largest student-run business in the nation with about 200 student employees in 10 divisions and annual revenues of more than $1.2 million. Several centers within the School of Business Administration offer specific focus on business topics and emphasize hands-on learning. The L. William Crotty Center for Entrepreneurial Leadership focuses on business development and provides funding for sophomores to start up and run real businesses. In the Davis Center for Portfolio Management, students manage nearly $60 million of the university's endowment. Other centers include the Hanley Trading Center the Center for Professional Selling, Center for Project Excellence, and Center for the Integration of Faith and Work. The Business Research Group conducts research for business and government partners. The university has also joined the Dayton Arcade restoration project, announcing the development of entrepreneurship initiative at the rebuilt Arcade. The School of Business also offers several MBA programs, including its flexible option of obtaining an MBA online.

The University of Dayton School of Law is one of nine in Ohio. In addition to a traditional juris doctor degree earned in three years, the university offers an accelerated two-year option. It was among the first in the nation to create a two-year option and a hybrid online J.D. program In addition to the J.D. programs, the school offers graduate degrees in American and Transnational Law, including a Master of Laws (LL.M.) and a Master in the Study of Law (M.S.L.); a joint J.D./M.B.A. degree, a joint J.D./M.S. in Educational Administration degree, a joint J.D./M.P.A. Master of Public Administration degree, and an M.S.L. in Government Contracting, among others.

=== Undergraduate admissions ===
Undergraduate admissions statistics
- 2023 entering class
- Admit rate: 61.8%
- Yield rate: 13.9%

Test scores middle 50%^{[i]}
- SAT Total: 1180–1350 (among 12% of FTFs)
- ACT Composite: 24–30 (among 37% of FTFs)

High school GPA
- Average: 3.75

Admission to the University of Dayton is classified as "selective" by the Carnegie Classification of Institutions of Higher Education. The Princeton Review gives Dayton an "Admissions Selectivity Rating" of 87 out of 99.

In 2023, the university received 22,485 applications. It extended offers of admission to 13,903 applicants, or 62%, after holistic review that includes examination of academic rigor, performance and admissions test scores. 1,934 accepted students chose to enroll, a yield rate of 14%. Of the 12% of incoming students in 2023 who submitted SAT scores, the interquartile range was 1180–1350; of the 37% of incoming students in 2023 who submitted ACT scores, the interquartile range was 24–30. Of all matriculating students, the average high school GPA was 3.75.

In 2013, the university introduced an innovative net-price tuition plan with a four-year guarantee that a student's grants and scholarships would increase each year to cover any tuition increase. The plan eliminates additional fees and includes an option for free books. The plan drew national coverage from The Chronicle of Higher Education, Governing magazine and was favorably reviewed by consumer advocate Clark Howard.

Tuition for the 2026–27 academic year is $51,910.

=== Rankings ===
Academic rankings

National
- Forbes: 169
- U.S. News & World Report: 136
- Washington Monthly: 137
- WSJ/College Pulse: 78

In its 2026 rankings, U.S. News & World Report ranked the university's undergraduate program 143rd (tied) among 436 national universities.

=== Study abroad ===
The University of Dayton has nearly 50 programs for credit or service-learning for a summer, semester or full year abroad through the Center for International Programs. Students can participate in for-credit programs at a partner institution or through a program taught by UD faculty around the world. International programs are offered in Argentina, Austria, China, Czech Republic, Finland, France, Germany, Honduras, Hungary, Ireland, Italy, Korea, Mexico, Morocco, Netherlands, New Zealand, Nicaragua, Spain, and the United Kingdom.

The Center for Social Concern offers intercultural service-learning opportunities during breaks in the academic calendar. International programs are in Cameroon, Zambia, India, Ecuador, El Salvador, Panama, Belize, Mexico, and Guatemala. Students can also participate in domestic programs to experience cultural diversity within the United States. The new University of Dayton China Institute in Suzhou began offering classes in summer 2013.

After setting records for first-year international enrollment the past few years, in 2012 approximately one in 10 students was from another country. The University of Dayton's China Institute closed its doors in 2019.

A growing number of students, notably women, from predominantly Muslim countries are enrolling at the university, part of a trend of overseas Muslim women choosing Catholic colleges and universities. A New York Times story in 2012 noted the trend and featured the University of Dayton.

=== Libraries ===
The Roesch Library houses the university's main library, the Marian Library/International Marian Research Institute (IMRI), and the Ryan C. Harris Learning Teaching Center.

The University of Dayton Libraries, consisting of the Roesch Library, Marian Library/International Marian Research Institute, and University Archives and Special Collections, are the university's principal centers for the collection, dissemination and preservation of diverse information resources, Catholic and Marian collections and research, and the university's historical records. The print and electronic collections in Roesch Library include more than 1.3 million books and 69,000 journals. eCommons, a service of University Libraries, is a permanent multimedia archive of UD's education and research.

The University of Dayton's Marian Library/International Marian Research Institute (IMRI) is the world's largest repository of books, artwork, and artifacts devoted to Mary, the mother of Christ, and a pontifical center of research and scholarship with a vast presence in cyberspace.

The university has also been involved in numerous education abroad and service-learning projects involving the assessment and construction of libraries worldwide. In 2023, the Center for Social Concern organized an immersion trip to Puerto Rico, where participants led and served by rescuing and healing the abandoned resources of a decommissioned, public-school library. They then pre-classified and transferred them to two community branches of the newly created Citizen's Library, a project inspired by the university libraries and the Lubwe Zambia Immersion library pilot project.

== Research ==
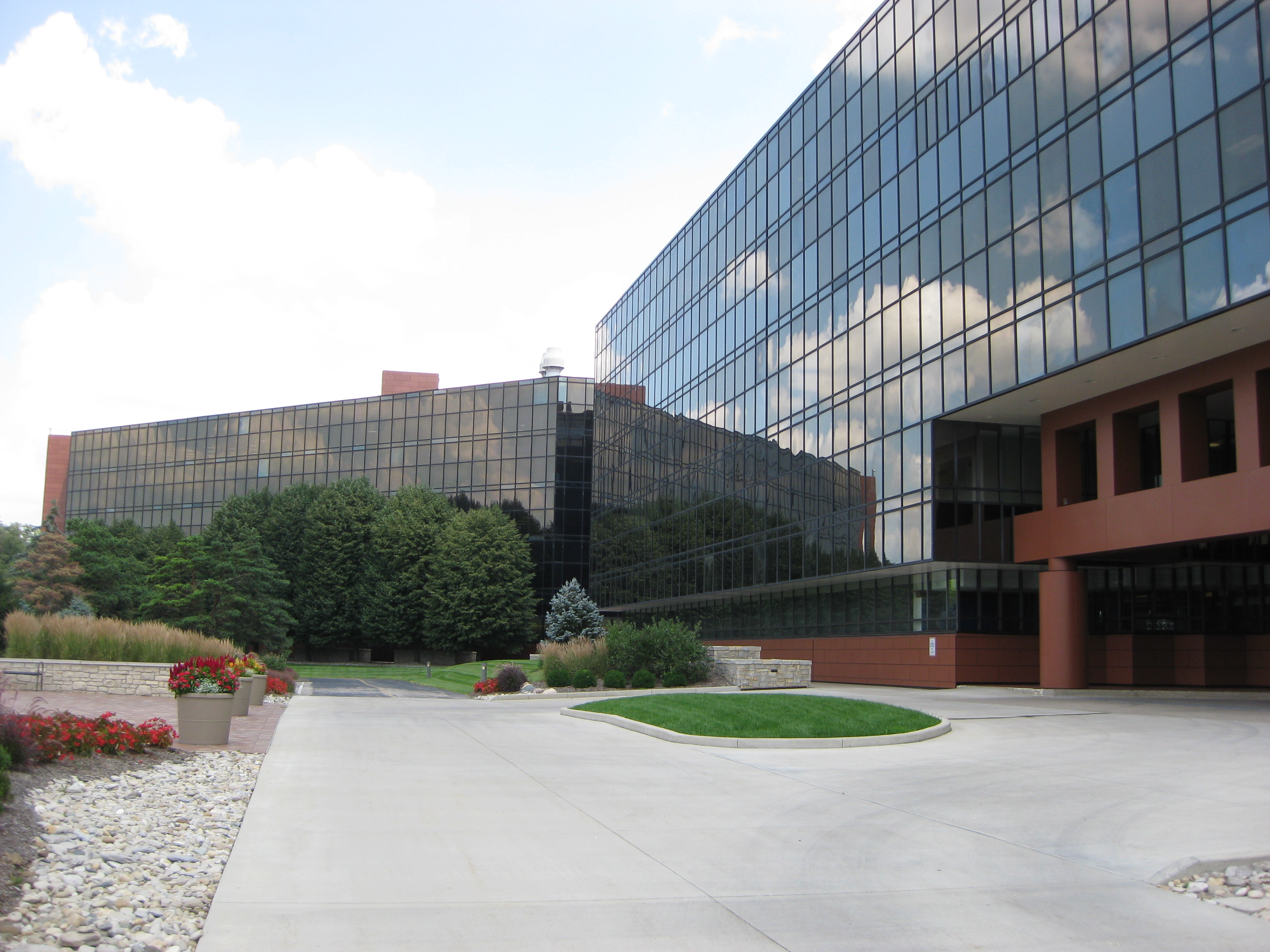
University of Dayton Research Institute

The University of Dayton Research Institute has performed more than $2.5 billion in total sponsored research since its inception. Most of the research is done in engineering, either by 640 full-time researchers at the University of Dayton Research Institute (UDRI) or engineering faculty. More than 370 undergraduate and graduate students work alongside researchers.

Materials engineering accounts for most of the research within engineering, followed by electrical engineering. The university's engineering research played a role in GE Aviation's decision to locate the new Electrical Power Integrated Systems Research and Development Center (EPISCENTER) on the University of Dayton campus. The center opened in early 2014.

The Research Institute has seven divisions: Aerospace Mechanics, Energy And Environmental Engineering, Energy Technologies And Materials, Multi-Scale Composites And Polymers, Nonstructural Materials, Structural Integrity, and Sensor Systems.

There are 10 centers in School of Engineering.

More than 150 patents have been assigned to the University of Dayton, including one for hotbags that Domino's Pizza uses to keep delivery pizzas hot. Bob Kauffman, a UDRI distinguished research chemist and Fluid Analysis group leader, was an inventor of the Power Activated Technology for Conductor Healing (PATCH), a self-healing wire for which R&D Magazine gave a Top 100 Award. Kauffman also received Top 100 awards from R&D Magazine for the Remaining Useful Life Evaluation Routine (RULER), a "smart" dipstick used to measure the quality of oils in use in aircraft, automobiles, and cooking vats, and the Status and Motion Activated Radiofrequency Tag (SMART) Sensor, which is a modified, passive radio frequency identification (RFID) tag that becomes readable only after a monitored problem has occurred. The Research Institute also developed and operates the world's only test facility to certify sulkies that race in U.S. Trotting Association sanctioned events and was involved in creating an Engineered Material Arresting System (EMAS) installed at airports around the country to stop runaway aircraft.

== Housing ==
More than 90 percent of undergraduates live in campus housing, making the University of Dayton one of the most residential campuses in the country. All first-year students are required to live in a residence hall. Sophomores are eligible to live in a residence hall or apartment, and juniors, seniors, and fifth-years are eligible to live in apartments or one of more than 300 University-owned houses.

=== Residence halls ===
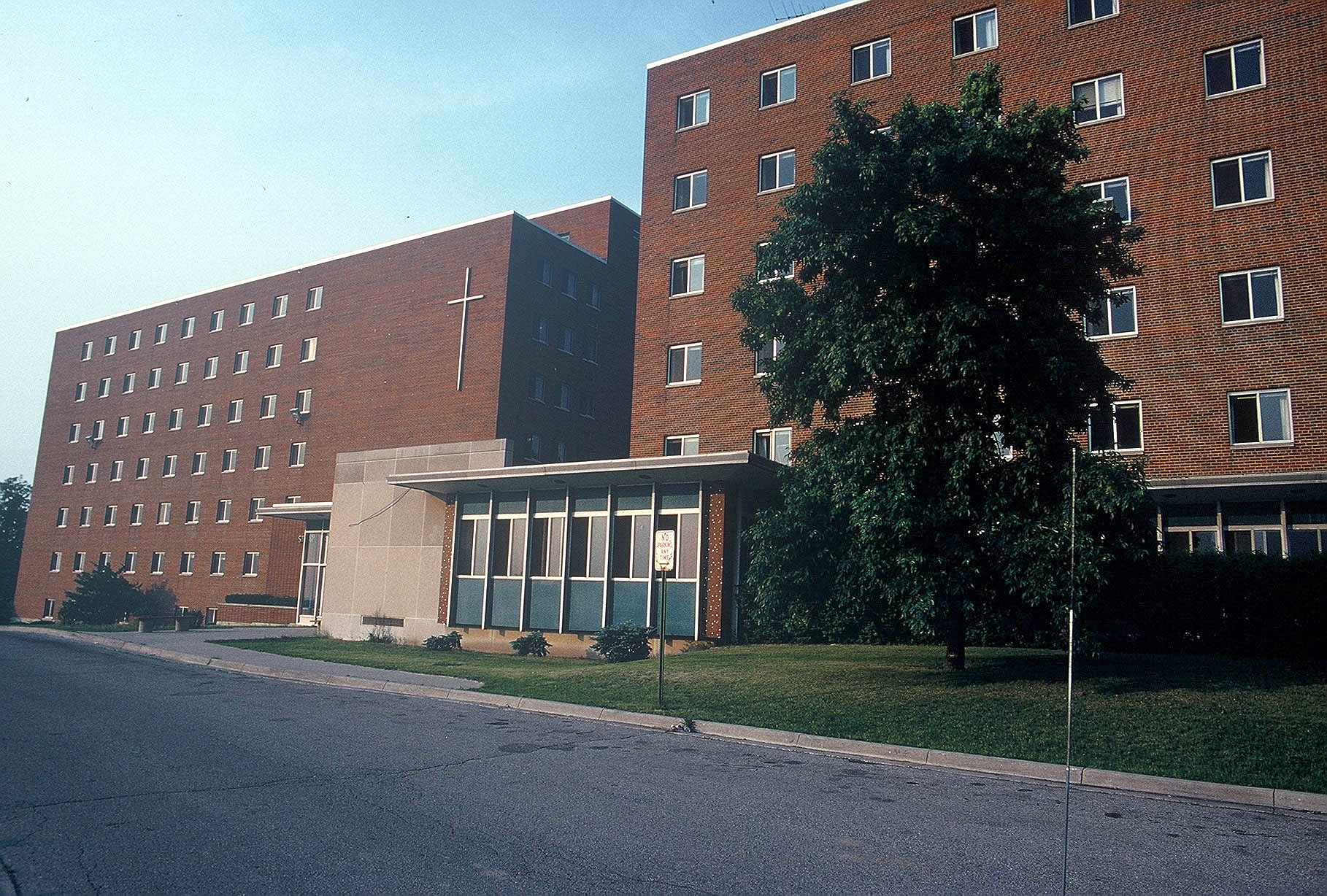
Stuart Hall, circa 1977

Located in the heart of campus, Founders Hall is U-shaped and houses 400 first-year students. Its lobby is shared by the entire building. Founders Hall is coed by floor, and all rooms are double occupancy, except for two rooms, which are quads. Founders was newly renovated during the summer of 2013.

Marianist Hall was built in 2004 and is composed of three separate wings. The east wing houses 128 first-year students, coed by floor, in double-occupancy rooms. The middle and west wings house 256 second-year students, coed by floor. A chapel, bookstore, credit union, food emporium, learning center, and post office are also located in Marianist Hall.

Marycrest Complex is the largest community housing on campus. It is coed by floor, has three sections that house 940 first-year students by floor and wing. Marycrest has double-occupancy rooms for first-year students, as well as a limited number of single-occupancy rooms. A dining facility is part of this complex. Marycrest also includes the late-night stop, Crest Express. Renovations were completed in summer 2007.

Stuart Complex (Stu) is composed of three separate first-year student halls housing 632 students and sharing a common lobby. Before renovations in 2009, Adele Hall housed women, Meyer Hall housed men, and Sheehy Hall housed men and women, coed by floor. Now, each wing has both men and women co-ed by floor. All rooms are double occupancy. A convenience store known as "Stuart's Landing" is part of this complex.

Virginia W. Kettering Hall (VWK) houses 636 sophomores in 158 four-person suites and two 2-person suites. Each suite has a living room, two bedrooms, and a bathroom. Suites are furnished, have two small refrigerators, and are air-conditioned. The residence hall also contains a dining room for 500 students and two meeting rooms.

=== Apartments ===
The university owns a number of apartment buildings for student housing; these include the Lawnview Apartments (165 students in 42 suites), Campus South (318 students in 53 suites), Garden Apartments (544 students in 138 suites), Plumwood Apartments with 55 suites for law and graduate students, and furnished apartments above Brown Street businesses in University Place.

In 2013, the university purchased three more condominium units at Irving Commons southeast of campus. The university already owned 54 beds and 60 leases.

The Caldwell Street Apartments opened in 2012 on six acres along Caldwell and Brown streets on the site of a former car dealership. The $25 million project houses more than 400 upperclass students in townhouse-style apartments.

ArtStreet opened in 2004 and offers townhouse and loft apartments to 58 juniors and seniors in the center of the south student neighborhood. ArtStreet combines living spaces with multi-purpose studio facilities and includes a student-run café, recording studio and WUDR Flyer Radio. In an effort to establish and expand the IACT program located at ArtStreet, the recording studio was dismantled and replaced with IACT offices in 2018.

=== Student neighborhoods ===
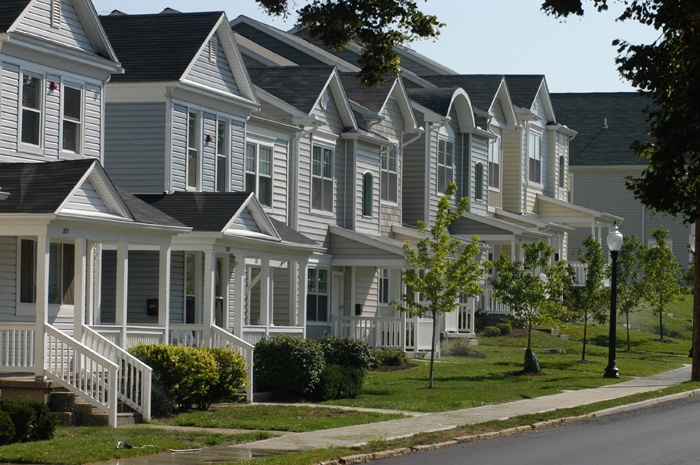
University of Dayton Student Neighborhood, commonly referred to as the "Ghetto"

The University of Dayton has a large student neighborhood, with more than 400 student residences owned by the university and private landlords. Students colloquially refer to the student neighborhood as "the Ghetto." Dayton's student neighborhood is south of downtown Dayton and north of the city of Oakwood. Originally used by the NCR Corporation as company housing, the university began acquiring properties in the neighborhood in the 1950s.

== Student life ==
The Integrated Learning Living Communities (ILLCs) at the university provide students with an organized educational experience that focuses on a central topic. Topics include "Writing and the Arts", "Women in Science and Engineering", "Business and Marianist Values", and "Sustainability, Energy and the Environment". First-year students are assigned housing and placed in classes according to the ILLC they have selected.

=== Campus ministry ===
The Office of Campus Ministry facilitates residence life ministries, liturgies, retreats, faith communities, and the Center for Social Concern. There are campus ministers in residence halls and in the student neighborhoods. UD employs a full-time Campus Minister of Interdenominational Ministry to help nurture the spiritual needs of students from various Protestant backgrounds. Campus Ministry also has support groups and offers spiritual guidance to students, faculty, and staff.

The Mass schedule includes daily and weekly Masses in residence halls, the chapel and the student neighborhood, a Spanish Mass, and a Black Catholic Mass.

Campus ministry offers several retreats throughout the year with different themes.

Student religious organizations on campus include Athletes in Action, Campus Crusade for Christ, Catholic Life, Chi Rho Catholic Men's Group, Muslim Student Association, Navigators, Orthodox Christian Fellowship, and Phi Lambda Iota Catholic Women's Group.

=== Service learning ===
The University of Dayton offers many service learning opportunities for students, regardless of their major. The Fitz Center for Leadership in Community and the Center for Social Concern are the most active organizers of service-learning opportunities. The Fitz Center houses the Dayton Civic Scholars, the Rivers Institute, Semester of Service, Neighborhood School Centers, Graduate Community Fellows, and Community Service Learning. The Center for Social Concern, which is part of campus ministry, offers "numerous opportunities for reflective service, service-learning, and education and advocacy for justice." The center provides many domestic and international service-learning opportunities during breaks in the academic calendar.

=== Christmas on Campus ===
Each year since 1964, usually on December 8, the Feast of the Immaculate Conception, University of Dayton students have hosted about 1,000 Dayton school children, giving them gifts and escorting them through campus for games, dancing, singing, crafts, face-painting, and Santa Claus. The event is free and open to the public and includes a live Nativity scene, a reading on the birth of Jesus, and the lighting of a Christmas tree. The evening ends with hundreds of students attending a Mass in the Immaculate Conception Chapel.

Ellie Kurtz, director of the University of Dayton's student union from 1964 to 1994, started Christmas on Campus as a way for students to celebrate Christmas before heading home for the winter break. "One night I was preoccupied with a sense of disappointment that students would be leaving for Christmas vacation and would not be able to celebrate Christmas with their friends and the UD family," Kurtz said before her death in 2009, "I imagined what a wonderful Christmas we could have if we could celebrate Christmas before the students went home for the holidays".

=== Club and intramural sports ===
In addition to varsity athletics, there are 37 club and 12 intramural sports. In January 2006, the university opened RecPlex, a $25 million sports and recreational facility for students of the university. In 2026 RecPlex went through a $30.1 million expansion. The Princeton Review has the University of Dayton first on its latest "Everybody Plays Intramural Sports" list.

The men's lacrosse club team won the 2015 and 2023 Men's Collegiate Lacrosse Association Division II national championship.

=== Student-run media ===
The University of Dayton has a student newspaper (Flyer News), student-run radio station (WUDR Flyer Radio 99.5/98.1 FM), student-run TV station Flyer Station, and Orpheus Art & Literary Magazine (the oldest student ran organization).

=== Greek life ===
Fraternities and sororities have been a part of student life at the University of Dayton since 1933, but only formally recognized since 1967. In 2015–16, 15 percent of undergraduate men and 22 percent of undergraduate women were members of a fraternity or sorority.

== Athletics ==
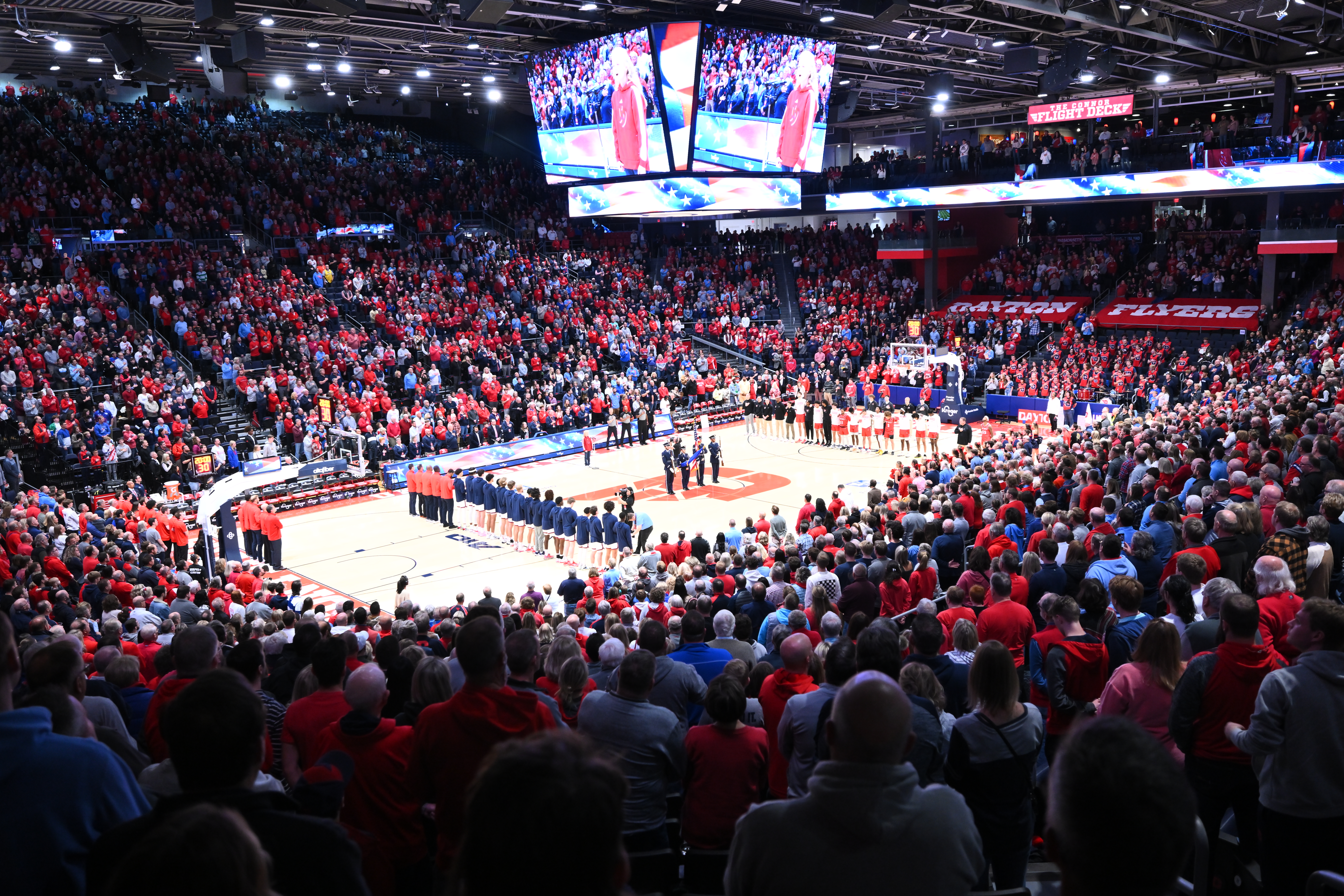
UD Arena

The Dayton Flyers compete in the Atlantic 10 Conference in all sports except football, in which they compete in the Pioneer Football League. The Flyers' mascot is "Rudy Flyer," a pun based on the university's initials, "U.D." Rudy is a barnstorming pilot who wears goggles and a leather pilot's helmet. The nickname "Flyers" is a tribute to the Wright Brothers who began their careers and invented the airplane in Dayton. The fight song is "Victory."

The university sponsors 16 sports: men's and women's basketball, men's and women's cross country, men's and women's golf, men's and women's soccer, men's and women's tennis, baseball, football, softball, women's volleyball, women's rowing, and women's track. UD's spirit group, the Red Scare, supports many of the Flyers athletics teams. Dayton's historic rivalries in most sports have involved fellow Southwest Ohio schools—the Cincinnati Bearcats, Miami RedHawks, and Xavier Musketeers. Dayton and Xavier played for the Blackburn/McCafferty Trophy during their regular season men's basketball matchups before Xavier moved to the Big East Conference.

The Dayton Flyers men's basketball team is one of the biggest sports attractions in the Dayton area with the Flyers perennially ranking in the NCAA Division I top 30 in basketball attendance. The men's basketball team reached the 1967 NCAA Division I Men's Basketball Championship final game and won the National Invitational Tournament in 1962, 1968, and 2010. In 2014, the men's basketball Flyers made it to the NCAA Elite Eight. The Flyer Pep Band, led by Dr. Willie Morris III, also plays at all home men and women basketball games.

The football team won NCAA Division III national titles in 1980 and 1989 and finished runner-up in 1981, 1987, and 1991. The Sports Network also named the Flyers football squad the nation's top Football Championship Subdivision mid-major program in 2007. The women's basketball team won the American Association of Intercollegiate Athletics for Women (AIAW) Division II national championship in 1980, a year after finishing as runner-up. The women's volleyball team appeared in the NCAA tournament 15 years. The women's soccer team has appeared in the NCAA tournament 10 times.

The University of Dayton Arena has hosted more Division I Men's Basketball Championship games (125) than any other venue in the US. Since 2001, the University of Dayton has hosted the beginning of the NCAA Division I men's basketball tournament.
