= St. Mary's Road =

St. Mary's Road may refer to:

== Canada ==
- St. Mary's Road, the colloquial name of an old route in southeastern Manitoba, made up the following modern roads:
  - Winnipeg Route 52
  - Manitoba Provincial Road 200, from Winnipeg to Ste. Agathe
  - Manitoba Provincial Road 246, from Ste. Agathe to St. Jean Baptiste
