= St. Mary's Hall, University of Dayton =

- U.S. National Register of Historic Places
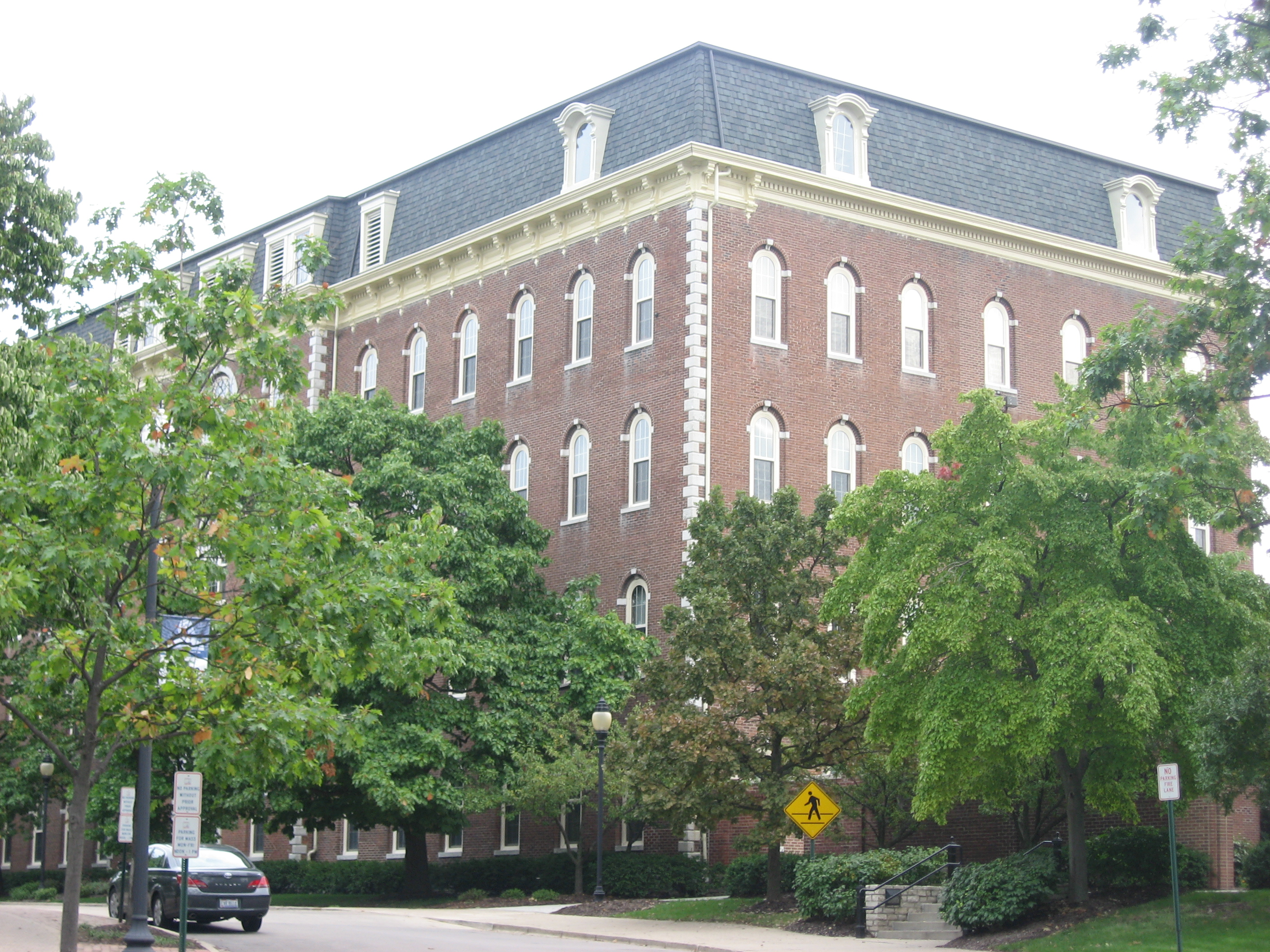

- Location within Ohio Location within the United States
- Location: 300 College Park; Dayton, Ohio
- Coordinates: 39°44′22″N 84°10′41″W
- Area: 58,000 square feet (5,400 m^{2})
- Built: 1870
- Architect: Maximin Zehler, John Reinbolt
- NRHP reference No.: 73001508
- Added to NRHP: May 25, 1973

Saint Mary's Hall in Dayton, Ohio is a building on the campus of the University of Dayton.

Originally, St. Mary's was a dormitory and classroom; today, it holds the offices of the bursar, human resources, president, provost, and services for current students such as financial aid, registration, student employment, and veterans services.

St Mary's cornerstone was laid in spring 1870 and was the tallest and largest building in Dayton when it was completed later that year. Costing $85,000 (equivalent to $2,164,000 in 2025), the five-story structure opened May 1, 1871. It was sometimes called "Zehler's Folly", after architect Brother Maximin Zehler, S.M., due to its large size.

Early on, large water tanks sat on the roof, supplied by water pumped directly from the Rubicon Stream (located at the modern site of Baujan Field). During the catastrophic Dayton flood of 1913, St. Mary's Hall served as a refuge center for displaced community members.

St. Mary's Hall was listed on the National Register of Historic Places on May 25, 1973.
