= St. Marys, South Dakota =

Coordinates: 44°04′05″N 97°37′46″W

St. Marys is a ghost town in Miner County, in the U.S. state of South Dakota.

== History ==
St. Mary's was laid out in 1886, and named for the daughter of the original landowner, Louis Gotthelf. A post office called St. Mary's was established in 1883, and closed in 1893. It reopened in 1902, with the name changed to St. Marys (without an apostrophe), and closed permanently in 1909. The name of the town was changed to Argonne, South Dakota in 1919 after the battle of Meuse-Argonne in France in World War I.
