= Crookesmoor Road =

Road in Sheffield, England

Coordinates: 53.3854°N 1.4941°W

Crookesmoor Road

Crookesmoor Road is a main road in Sheffield, South Yorkshire, England connecting the districts of Crookes, Crookesmoor and Broomhill. It is one of the longest roads in Sheffield, and home of a large student population. The University of Sheffield School of Architecture is also based here.

Crookesmoor Road is composed mainly of Victorian terraces, complete with cellars and small yards; the majority of houses are landlord-owned and rented to students at the University of Sheffield.
