= St Mary's Island =

St Mary's Island may refer to:

== Places ==
England

- St Mary's Island, Kent, in Medway
- St Mary's Island, River Thames, in the county of Berkshire
- St Mary's Island (Tyne and Wear), in the metropolitan county of Tyne and Wear
- St Mary's, Isles of Scilly, in the county of Cornwall

India

- St. Mary's Islands, in the state of Karnataka

Isle of Man

- St Mary's Isle, Douglas Bay

Madagascar

- Île Sainte-Marie, also known as St Mary's Island in English, in the region of Analanjirofo

The Gambia

- Another name for Banjul Island, in Banjul division
