= Saint Mary's Bay =

Saint Mary's Bay is the name of several places:

- St. Mary's Bay, Newfoundland and Labrador
- St. Marys Bay, Nova Scotia, Canada
- Saint Marys Bay, New Zealand, a suburb of Auckland, New Zealand
- St Mary's Bay, Kent, a village in England
- St. Mary's Bay, Devon, a beach near Brixham, England
