= St Mary's GAA =

St Mary's GAA may refer to:

- St Mary's GAA (Carbery), a sports club in County Cork, Ireland
- St Mary's GAA (Donegal), a sports club in Convoy, County Donegal, Ireland
- St Mary's GAA (Dublin), a sports club in Saggart, Ireland
- St Mary's GAA (Kerry), a sports club in Cahersiveen, Ireland
- St Mary's GAA (Leitrim), a sports club in Kiltoghert, near Carrick-on-Shannon, Ireland
- St Mary's GAA (Longford), a sports club in Granard, Ireland
- St Mary's GAA (Louth), a sports club in Ardee, Ireland
- St Mary's GAA (Meath), a sports club in Donore, County Meath, Ireland
- St Mary's Rochfortbridge GAA, a sports club in County Westmeath, Ireland
- St Mary's Rosslare GAA, a sports club in County Wexford, Ireland
- St Mary's GAA (Shandon), a sports club in County Cork, Ireland
- St Mary's GAA (Sligo), a sports club in the western ward of Sligo, Ireland
- St Mary's GAA (Tipperary), a sports club in Clonmel, Ireland
- St Mary's GAA (Waterford), a sports club between Dungarvan and Clonmel which uses this title when contesting hurling competitions
- St Mary's, a college team which has competed in Gaelic football against Ulster counties in the Dr McKenna Cup

== See also ==
- Banagher GAC, a sports club occasionally referred to as St Mary's
- Burren GAA, a sports club occasionally referred to as St Mary's
- Devenish St Mary's GAA, a sports club
- Granemore GFC, a sports club occasionally referred to as St Mary's
- Killeeshil St Mary's GAC, a sports club
- Killyclogher St Mary's GAC, a sports club
- Killyman St Mary's GAC, a sports club
- Leixlip GAA, a sports club occasionally referred to as St Mary's
- Maguiresbridge St Mary's GFC, a sports club
