= Saint Mary's Cemetery =

Saint Mary's Cemetery may refer to:

== United States ==
- Saint Mary Cemetery (Oakland, California)
- St. Mary's Cemetery, part of Putnam Cemetery, Greenwich, Connecticut
- Saint Mary's Cemetery (Maryland), in Rockville, Maryland
- Saint Mary's Cemetery (Newton Lower Falls, Massachusetts)
- Saint Mary Cemetery, a cemetery in Omaha, Nebraska
- St. Mary's Cemetery, East Orange, a cemetery in New Jersey
- Saint Mary's Cemetery, Hackensack, a cemetery in New Jersey
- St. Mary's Cemetery (Mine Hill Township, New Jersey)
- St. Mary's Cemetery (Lawrence County, Tennessee)
- Saint Mary's Catholic Cemetery, Norfolk, Virginia
- St. Mary's Cemetery (Washington, D.C.)

== Other places ==
- St. Marys Cemetery, St. Marys, Ontario, Canada
- St. Mary's Cemetery, Wandsworth, Wandsworth, London, UK
- St. Mary's Roman Catholic Cemetery, Kensal Green, London, UK
