= University of Dayton Ghetto =

Human settlement in Dayton, Ohio, United States of America

Coordinates: 39°44′06″N 84°10′36″W

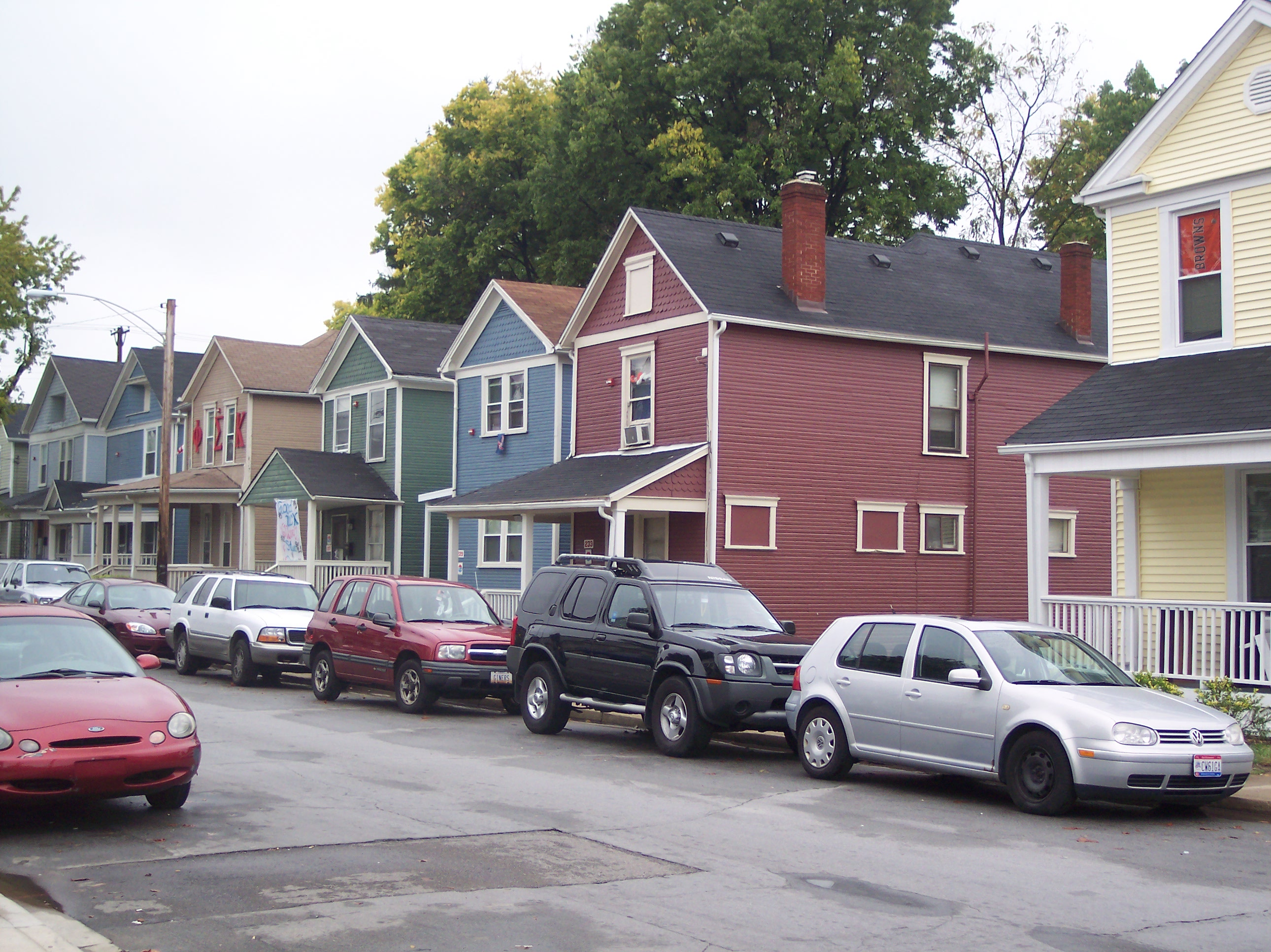
The 200 block of Kiefaber Street in the University of Dayton Student Neighborhood in Dayton, Ohio

The University of Dayton Student Neighborhood, located in Dayton, Ohio, is home to upperclassmen at the University of Dayton (UD). The UD Student Neighborhood is leased in an arrangement that resembles both traditional university housing and a landlord/tenant relationship. Tracing its history back to the 1870s, the neighborhood now includes more than 200 university-owned houses as well as landlord-owned houses, high-density housing and gathering spaces. With the inclusion of Holy Angels and The Darkside, or officially "the North Student Neighborhood", two smaller neighborhoods the university owns property in, there are more than 400 houses currently used as student residential space. Because of the area's age, the university has been engaged in a program to renovate and update the houses, and several additional changes to the neighborhood are expected in the coming years as part of the university's Master Plan.

== History and geography ==
Dayton's Student Neighborhood is south of downtown Dayton but north of the city of Oakwood. The Great Miami River is just more than half a mile to the west, and Interstate 75 is just more than a mile to the west. In its current form, it is bounded by Brown Street to the west, Irving Avenue to the south, Trinity Avenue and Evanston Avenue to the east, and Caldwell Street and Stonemill Road to the north. This gives the area a roughly triangular shape.

The land on which the Neighborhood sits was owned by John Henry Patterson until the mid-1870s. The land was then divided between suburban housing lots to the east and the NCR factory to the west. The original proprietors of the neighborhood were Thomas S. Babbitt, Dr. Joseph E. Lowes, R. D. Hughes and Harry Kiefaber. The area was known as the town of Babbitt, and in its original form included only four streets: Lowes Street, Kiefaber Street, Hughes (now Stonemill Road) and Wead (now Lawnview Avenue). This core area was measured at 47 acres (190,000 m^{2}).

The NCR Corporation used Babbitt as housing for its workers. In 1906, the area was annexed by the city of Dayton and continued on as a middle-class neighborhood. The University of Dayton, Babbitt's neighbor to the northeast, began to buy available houses in the neighborhood in the 1950s as an experiment in off-campus housing. By the 1970s, the student population of the area was growing rapidly.

While it is unknown when the area began its life as the "Ghetto", there have been several efforts to rename it. In the 1960s, Rev. Norbert Burns, who taught at the university for 62 years before retiring in 2007 at the age of 82, was part of one such effort. His committee attempted to change the name to the "Village", an effort which ultimately failed. University administrators now refer to the area as the "Student Neighborhood", as the phrase "Ghetto" is offensive to many students and faculty at the school. Traditionally, the term "ghetto" refers to "a quarter of a city in which members of a minority group live especially because of social, legal, or economic pressure." It should also be noted that this term is incongruous with the racial makeup of the university's student body, as 75.1% of students identified as white in 2022. As result, the university has received criticism for its appropriation of subjugated experiences, as well as its lackluster approach to changing student culture.

== Changes since 2000 ==
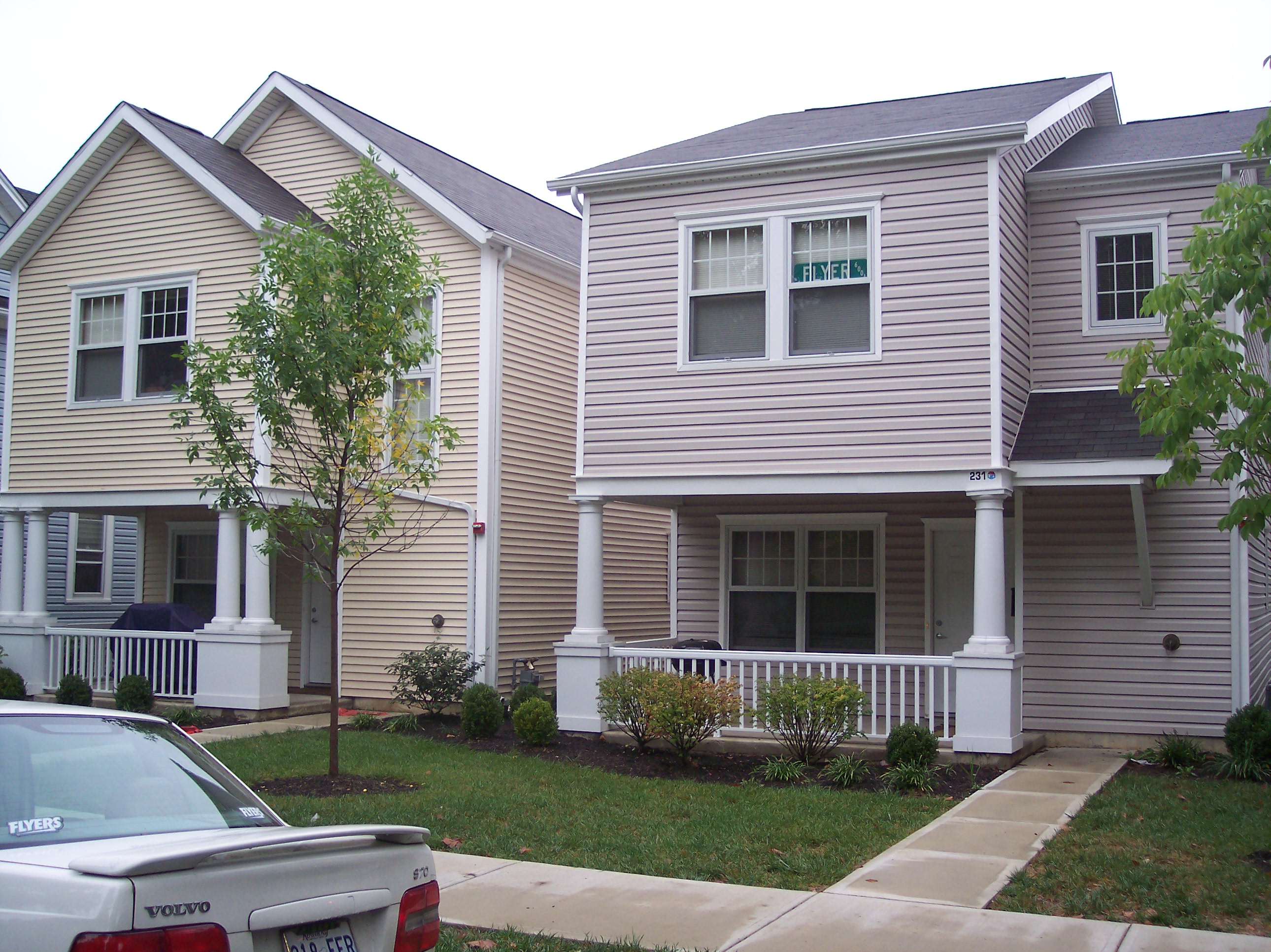
227 and 231 Irving Avenue, two of the new five-person houses in the UD Student Neighborhood.

As the houses in the Neighborhood age, and as the number of students wishing to live in the Neighborhood expands, the university has begun a renovation and replacement program with the goal of keeping the current feel of the area intact. In 2000, construction began on several new duplexes to fill land that was unused, resulting in housing for several dozen additional students. The duplexes housed six students per side, for a total of 12 students each. In 2003, the university continued the project by tearing down several houses on Stonemill Road and replacing them with a new five-person design. Several more of these houses have now been built throughout the Neighborhood.

In 2006, the university began a new phase of replacement and renovation in the neighborhood, in which $2.5 million was spent to renovate four existing structures, including a duplex, as well as to build a five-unit set of attached townhouses. The houses, located on Frericks Way and Stonemill Road, house 55 students and include the famous "Castle" which has been given a new faux-stone facade in homage to its traditional name. The houses became available to students for the 2007 – 2008 academic year.

The new wave of construction brings the university's stock of houses to 328, including several duplexes. Not including these new additions, as of 2005, the university owned 225 houses in the Neighborhood, with the rest on the Darkside, the other half of the University of Dayton campus. Additionally, 73 houses in the neighborhood were owned by private landlords and rented to UD students.

The newest building in the South Student Neighborhood is currently under construction on the corner of Frericks and Lowes Streets. The building standing there previously, the McGinnis Center was demolished, and the new construction will be called the Adele Center, after one of the co-founding Marianist women, Mother Adele de Bats de Trenquelléon, that the University of Dayton reveres. The $11.2 million apartment building will feature 96 new living spaces for upperclassmen students, with a first-floor front desk, office space, and other multipurpose spaces to serve the university. The building is set to open in the fall of 2018.

== Holy Angels and the Darkside ==
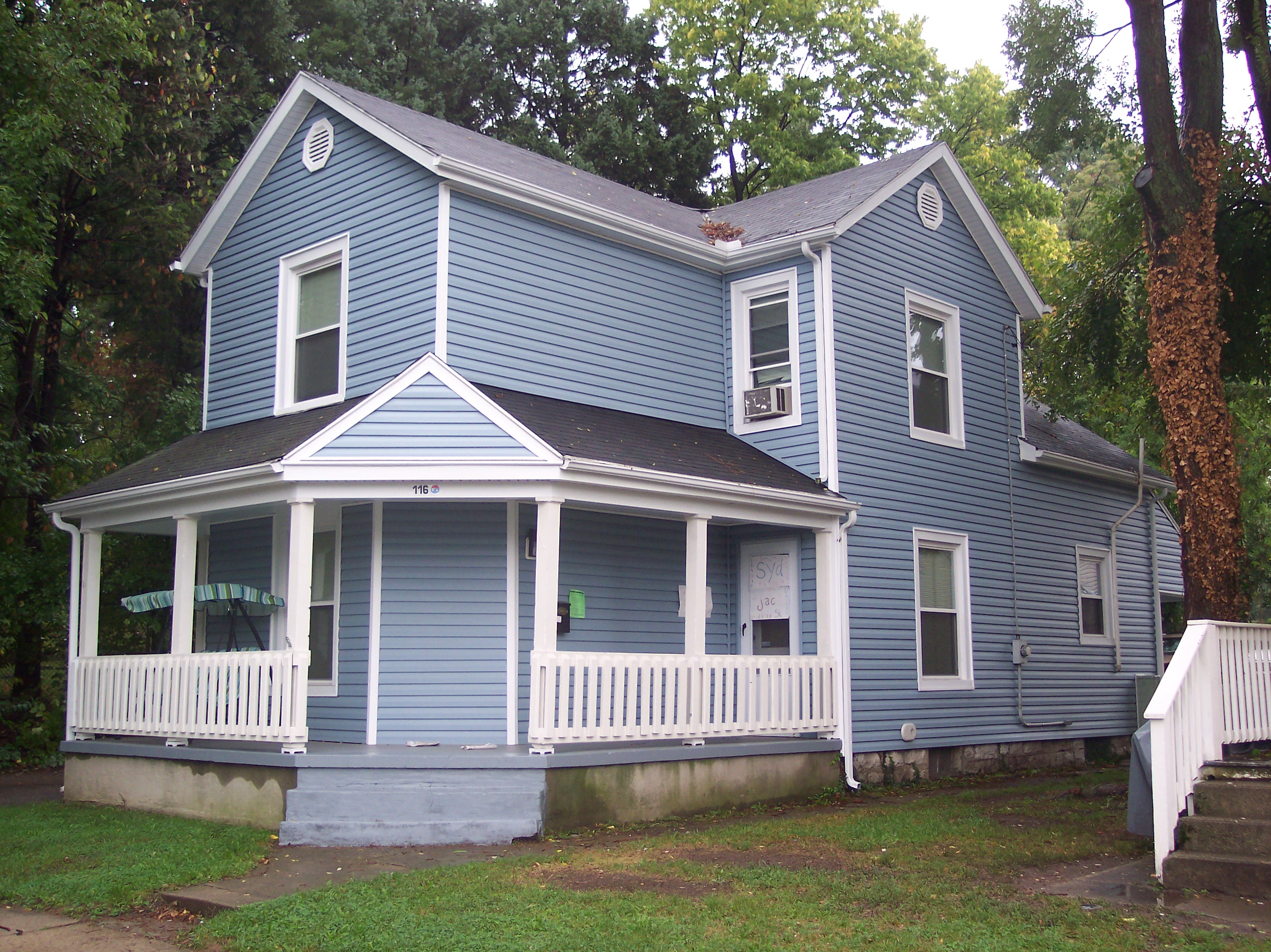
116 Chambers Street, a house on the Darkside

In addition to the properties the university owns in the Student Neighborhood, there are also student houses located in two other neighborhoods: the Darkside—or North Student Neighborhood, as it is referred to by the university—and Holy Angels, also known as "College Park". Once considered a single neighborhood and connected by the north-south Alberta Street, the areas were separated when the Thomas J. Frericks Center and a new formal entrance were added. Alberta Street now acts as the main thoroughfare for the Darkside, while the street has been rerouted and renamed College Park Avenue in the Holy Angels/College Park neighborhood. It is cut off from the portion in the Neighborhood, renamed Frericks Way.

The Darkside, which derives its name from a lack of street lights when students first began to move to the area, is bounded by Stewart Street to the south, Brown Street to the west, Woodland Cemetery to the east and Wyoming Street to the north. Traditionally, the Darkside has served as housing for juniors. Now with the introduction of AVIATE and points accumulated towards housing (more commonly referred to as PATH credits), Juniors and Seniors are more evenly distributed between the two. Both Juniors and Seniors are even in the assignments process and groups with more PATH credits chose their location first, regardless of seniority.

The third and smallest neighborhood, Holy Angels, derives its name from the Holy Angels Church and School that occupies the center of the area. Holy Angels is often alternatively referred to as College Park. It lies between the Darkside and the South Student Neighborhood, but is physically separated from them by Stewart Street and the Frericks Center parking lot.

== Features ==
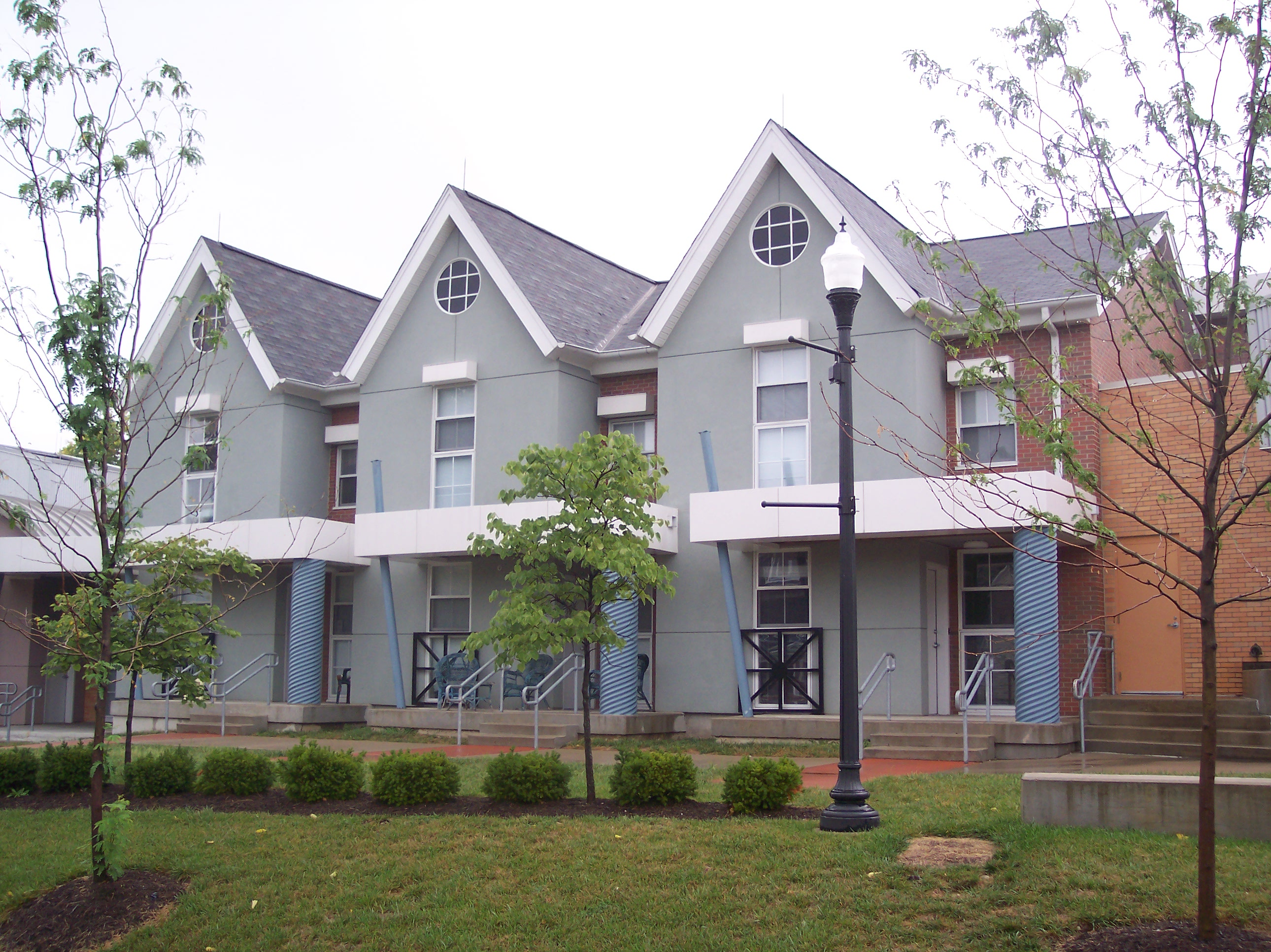
306, 308 and 310 Kiefaber Street, three of the units in the ArtStreet complex

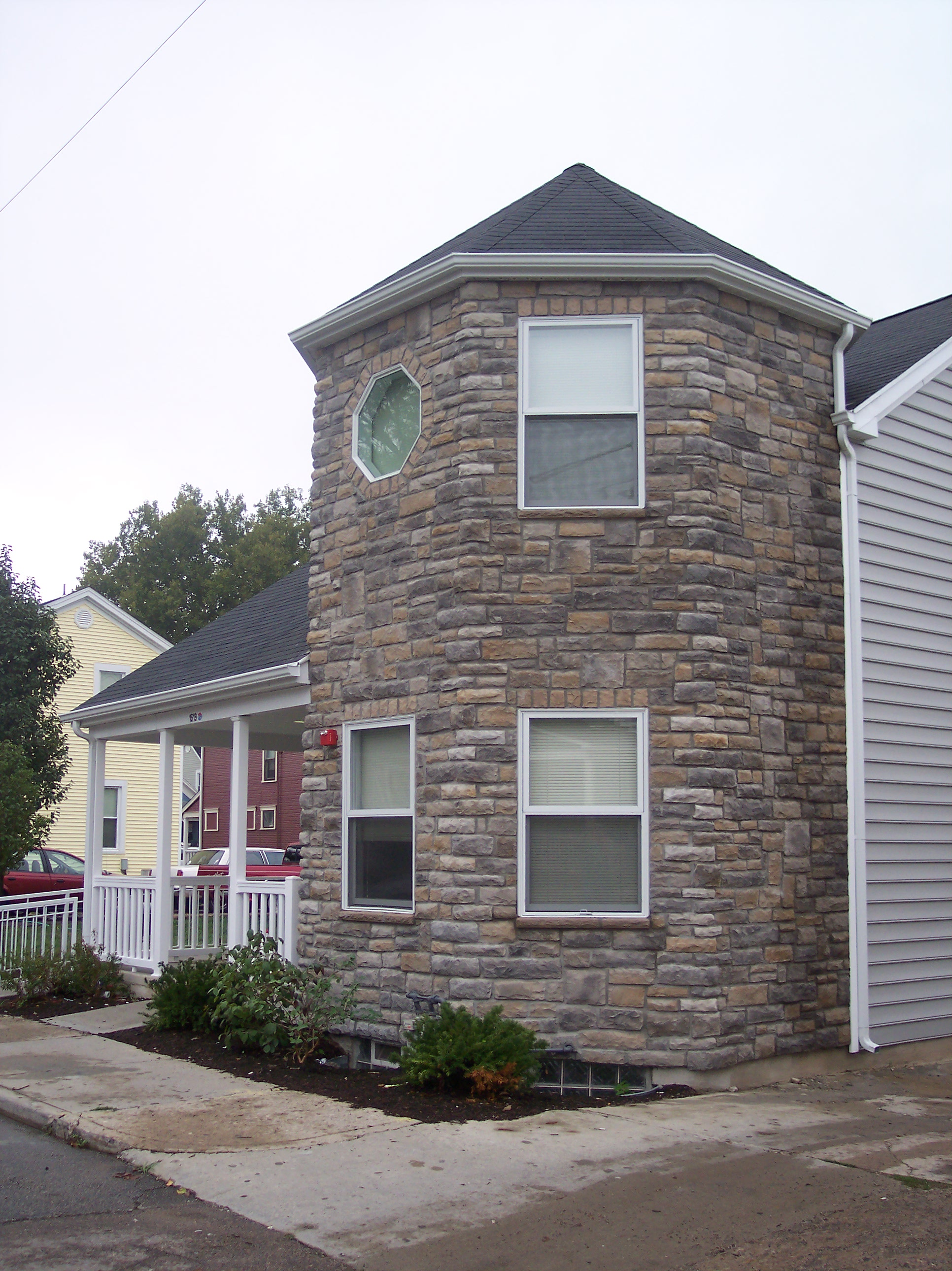
1519 Frericks Way, "The Castle," or "Castle House," a recently renovated house

Not all of the houses in the student neighborhoods are occupied by students. Four houses in both the South Student Neighborhood and the Darkside – on Trinity Avenue, Kiefaber Street, Stonemill Road and Chambers Street — are home to groups of Marianists, the Catholic religious institute behind UD. Between six and 10 Marianists live in each house. They serve the university as ministers, groundskeepers, administrators and professors, among other professions.

The Student Neighborhood also contains several high-density living areas, including the Garden Apartments, the Lawnview Apartments and the Campus South, a high-rise living complex for sophomores. In 2004, the ArtStreet complex opened, intended as a combined living-learning space. It includes housing for 56 students, as well as a cafe, an amphitheater, rehearsal rooms, several activity rooms and gallery spaces, and a new studio for the campus radio station, WUDR. The area was also home to the McGinnis school house, which was acquired in 1982 and renamed the McGinnis Center; it is used as a central point of contact for residents. In 2017 McGinnis Center was demolished to make room for the addition of an $11 million apartment style building. The building is set to open for the 2018 Fall semester.

Some houses in the neighborhood have been given informal nicknames by which they are commonly known, such as "The Deli House" at 237 Lowes St., "The F Shaq" at 418 Lowes St. and "The Crack House" at 1439 Frericks Way. For the majority of houses, nicknames are arbitrary and vary year to year. In addition, many houses in the Neighborhood are those occupied by various fraternities, sororities and other special interest groups.

== Future ==
In 2002, the University of Dayton released a Master Plan which called for the renovation and construction of several houses, an extension to Stonemill Road to connect directly to Evanston Avenue, and the enlargement and clean-up of the parking areas in the alleys behind the houses. Despite ongoing rumors, there were no plans to replace the neighborhood with more high-density housing and other university buildings, despite the landlocked nature of the campus.

In June 2005, before the plan could be realized, the university made a $25 million purchase of an additional 49 acres (200,000 m^{2})—much of the land which was once home to the NCR Corporation—as well as a new 100,000-square-foot (9,300 m^{2}) building on Brown Street. The area, renamed Mid Campus, prompted the development of a new Campus Master Plan.

While several new buildings have been planned, many of the changes that had been proposed to the Neighborhood in the previous master plan are no longer included in the new plan. The largest feature affecting the student neighborhoods is a new building to the east of Alberta Street, between Chambers Street and Obell Court, on the Darkside. According to the draft of the master plan, the building is intended to be a sustainable residence hall, a 75- to 90-bed facility that would also include an educational wing. The proposed building would use technologies such as solar energy, geothermal heating and cooling, compost piles and low-flow showers. The plan also calls for a walk/bike greenway to link the neighborhood to the core of campus and the athletic complex.
