= St. Mary's School =

St. Mary's School may refer to:

== Australia ==
- St Marys Senior High School, St Marys, New South Wales
- St Mary's College, Hobart, Tasmania
- St Mary's Primary School, West Melbourne, Victoria
- St Mary's Anglican Girls' School, Perth, Western Australia

== Canada ==
- St. Mary's High School (Calgary), Alberta
- St. Mary's Academy (New Brunswick)
- St. Mary's Catholic Secondary School, Cobourg, Ontario
- St. Mary Catholic Secondary School (Hamilton, Ontario)
- St. Mary's High School (Kitchener), Ontario
- St. Mary Catholic Secondary School (Pickering, Ontario)
- St. Mary's Catholic Secondary School (Toronto), Ontario
- St. Mary's Catholic High School (Woodstock, Ontario)

== Costa Rica ==
- Saint Mary High School (Guachipelin)

== Ghana ==
- St Mary's Senior High School (Ghana), Korle Gonno

== India ==
- St. Mary's English High School, Guwahati, Assam
- St. Mary's High School, Jorhat, Assam
- St. Mary's High School, North Lakhimpur, Assam
- St. Mary's Anglo-Indian Higher Secondary School, Chennai
- St. Mary's Convent High School, Goa, Mapusa, Goa
- St. Mary's Convent School, Kasauli, Himachal Pradesh
- St. Mary's Convent Girls High School, Ollur, Thrissur, Kerala
- St. Mary's Higher Secondary School, Thiruvananthapuram, Kerala
- St. Mary's Convent School, Dewas, Madhya Pradesh
- St. Mary's Convent School, Ujjain, Madhya Pradesh
- St. Mary's School, Mumbai, Maharashtra
- St. Mary's High School SSC, Mumbai, Maharashtra
- St. Mary's Convent High School, Mulund, Mumbai, Maharashtra
- St. Mary's School, Pune, Maharashtra
- St. Mary's Higher Secondary School, Jharsuguda, Odisha
- St. Mary's Higher Secondary School, Dindigul, Tamil Nadu
- St. Mary's Convent High School, Nainital, Uttarakhand

== Ireland ==
- St Mary's Secondary School, Charleville, County Cork
- St Mary's College, Dublin

== Jamaica ==
- St Mary High School, Jamaica, Saint Mary Parish

== Japan ==
- St. Mary's International School, Tokyo

== Kenya ==
- St. Mary's School, Nairobi
- St. Mary's School, Yala

== Korea, Republic of ==
- St. Mary's elementary School, Daejeon, Republic of Korea

== Malaysia ==
- St. Mary's School, Kuala Lumpur

== New Zealand ==
- St Mary's Catholic School, Gisborne District
- St Mary's Catholic School, Otorohanga District

== Pakistan ==
- St. Mary's High School, Peshawar, Khyber Pakhtunkhwa
- St Mary's Convent High School, Hyderabad, Sindh

== South Africa ==
- St Mary's School, Waverley, Gauteng
- St. Mary's Diocesan School for Girls, Pretoria, Gauteng
- St. Mary's Diocesan School for Girls, Kloof, KwaZulu-Natal

== Tristan da Cunha ==
- St. Mary's School, Edinburgh of the Seven Seas

== United Arab Emirates ==
- St. Mary's Catholic High School, Dubai, UAE
- St. Mary's Catholic High School, Fujairah

== United Kingdom ==
=== England ===
- St Mary's School Ascot, South Ascot, Berkshire
- St Mary's School, Gerrards Cross, Buckinghamshire
- St Mary's School, Cambridge, Cambridgeshire
- St Mary's School, Eccleston, Cheshire
- St Mary's Catholic High School, Chesterfield, Derbyshire
- St Mary's School, Shaftesbury, Dorset
- St Mary's School, Colchester, Essex
- St Mary's Primary School, Yate, Gloucestershire
- St Mary's Catholic High School, Astley, Greater Manchester
- St Mary's Catholic School, Bishop's Stortford, Hertfordshire
- St Mary's Church of England High School, Cheshunt, Hertfordshire
- St Mary's Roman Catholic High School, Lugwardine, Herefordshire
- St. Mary's Catholic High School, Menston, Leeds
- St Mary's Catholic High School, Grimsby, Lincolnshire
- St. Mary's Roman Catholic Primary School, Clapham, London
- St Mary's Roman Catholic High School, Croydon, London
- St Mary's College, Crosby, Merseyside
- St Mary's Convent School, Scarborough, North Yorkshire
- St Mary's School, Banbury, Oxfordshire
- St Mary's School, Wantage, Oxfordshire
- St Mary's Catholic Primary School, Portslade, Sussex
- St. Mary's Catholic School, Newcastle, Tyne and Wear
- St Mary's C of E Primary School, South Shields, Tyne and Wear
- St Mary's School, Calne, Wiltshire

=== Northern Ireland ===
- St Mary's Christian Brothers' Grammar School, Belfast, County Antrim
- St Mary's Primary School, Ballyward, County Down
- St Mary's High School, Newry, Newry, County Down
- St Mary's High School, Limavady, County Londonderry
- St Mary's Grammar School, Magherafelt, County Londonderry
- St Mary's Primary School, Fivemiletown, County Tyrone

=== Scotland ===
- St. Mary's School, Melrose
- St Mary's primary, Bathgate

== United States ==
Listed alphabetically by state, then by city

=== A–M ===
- St. Mary's High School (Phoenix, Arizona)
- St. Mary's College High School, Berkeley, California
- St. Mary's High School (Stockton, California)
- St. Mary's High School (Colorado Springs), Colorado
- St. Mary's School (Wilmington, Delaware)
- St. Mary's School (Knoxville, Illinois)
- School of St. Mary (Lake Forest, Illinois)
- St. Mary's School (Guttenberg, Iowa)
- St. Mary's High School (Remsen, Iowa)
- St. Mary's High School (Storm Lake, Iowa)
- St. Mary High School (Paducah, Kentucky)
- St. Mary's High School (Natchitoches, Louisiana)
- St. Mary's High School (Annapolis, Maryland)
- St. Mary's Ryken High School, Leonardtown, Maryland
- St. Peter's Roman Catholic Church-St. Mary's School, Southbridge, Massachusetts
- Saint Mary High School (Westfield, Massachusetts)
- St. Mary's High School (Lynn, Massachusetts)
- Saint Mary's School (Chelsea, Michigan)
- St. Mary High School (Lake Leelanau, Michigan)
- St. Mary High School (Royal Oak, Michigan)
- Shattuck-Saint Mary's, Faribault, Minnesota
- St. Mary's High School (Sleepy Eye, Minnesota)
- St. Mary's High School (Independence, Missouri)
- St. Mary's South Side Catholic High School, St. Louis, Missouri

=== N–Z ===
- St. Mary's High School (O'Neill, Nebraska)
- Saint Mary School, Bordentown, New Jersey
- St. Mary's Hall-Doane Academy, Burlington, New Jersey
- St. Mary High School (Jersey City, New Jersey)
- St. Mary High School (Rutherford, New Jersey)
- St. Mary High School, renamed in 2000 as Cardinal McCarrick High School, South Amboy, New Jersey
- St. Mary's High School (Lancaster, New York)
- St. Mary's High School (Manhasset, New York)
- Saint Mary's School (Raleigh, North Carolina)
- St. Mary Catholic School (Wilmington, North Carolina)
- St. Mary's High School (Devils Lake, North Dakota)
- St. Mary's Catholic School, Mansfield, Ohio
- Old St. Mary's School, Marietta, Ohio, listed on the NRHP in Washington County, Ohio
- St. Mary's School (Sandusky, Ohio), listed on the NRHP in Erie County, Ohio
- St. Mary Catholic Central High School, Sandusky, Ohio
- St. Mary's School (Medford, Oregon)
- St. Mary High School (Dell Rapids, South Dakota)
- St. Mary's School (Elkton, South Dakota), listed on the NRHP in Brookings County, South Dakota
- St. Mary's Episcopal School (Memphis, Tennessee), private school for girls
- St. Mary's Catholic School (Brownsville, Texas)
- St. Mary's Catholic School (Longview, Texas)
- St. Mary's Hall (San Antonio, Texas), a private school
- St. Mary's Catholic School (Temple, Texas)
- St. Mary's Catholic School (Richmond, Virginia)
- St. Mary Catholic High School (Neenah, Wisconsin)
- St. Marys High School (West Virginia), a high school in St. Marys, West Virginia

== See also ==
- St. Mary's Academy (disambiguation)
- Saint Mary's College (disambiguation)
- Saint Mary's University (disambiguation)
- Scoil Mhuire (disambiguation)
