= Mhuire =

Mhuire is the Irish name for the Virgin Mary.

It also may refer to:

== Schools ==
- Colaiste Mhuire (disambiguation)
  - Coláiste Mhuire, part of the Marino Institute of Education, affiliated with Trinity College, Dublin
  - Colaiste Mhuire, Dublin
  - Coláiste Mhuire, Mullingar, County Westmeath, Ireland
  - Mary Immaculate College (Coláiste Mhuire gan Smál), Limerick, Ireland
- Scoil Mhuire (disambiguation)
  - Scoil Mhuire, Buncrana
  - Scoil Mhuire, Clane
  - Scoil Mhuire, Cork
  - Scoil Mhuire, Longford

== Other uses ==
- Clann Mhuire CLG, Gaelic Athletic Association club based at Naul, County Dublin, Ireland
- Club Mhuire, the Irish Language Society in St. Mary's Grammar School, Magherafelt
- Cuan Mhuire, charitable drug, alcohol and gambling rehabilitation organisation in Ireland
- Eilean Mhuire, the most easterly of the Shiant Islands in the Outer Hebrides

== See also ==
- Muir (disambiguation)
- Muire
