= St Mary's Convent High School, Hyderabad =

St. Mary's Convent Girls Higher Secondary School, Hyderabad

Location
- Foujdari Road, Saddar, Hyderabad, Sindh; 71000; Pakistan
- Coordinates: 25°23′37″N 68°22′00″E

Information
- Other name: St Mary's Convent Girl's High School
- Type: Private primary and secondary school
- Religious affiliation: Catholicism
- Established: 1920s–1930s
- Founder: Archilles Meersman
- Local authority: Hyderabad Board of Education
- Oversight: Diocese of Hyderabad, Pakistan; Catholic Board of Education
- Principal: Sr Catherine Gill
- Staff: 170
- Gender: Girls
- Age: 4 to 16
- Enrollment: 240 (approx.) per year
- Campus size: 51,728 sq ft (4,805.7 m^{2})
- Houses: 4 houses Unity; Faith; Discipline; Truth
- Colours: Green and White
- Affiliations: St Bonaventure's High School

St Mary's Convent High School (alternatively St Mary's Convent Girl's High School) is a private Catholic primary and secondary school for girls located on Foujdari Road in Hyderabad in the Sindh province of Pakistan. It was founded as a part of St Bonaventure's High School specifically aimed at the educational needs of girls in the city. The convent is run by resident nuns of the Catholic Diocese of Hyderabad.

== History ==
For a history of the parent school, see History of St Bonaventure's High School

During the 1920s and early 1930s the missionary establishments in the southern Indian subcontinent laid foundations for a school in Hyderabad directly run under the church to provide education for the local people and impart religious teaching. At the time the school was established, there were about 50 schools for boys and 6 for girls. A parish priest named Archilles Meersman, principal of Saint Patrick's High School, Karachi, revived the state of the school in the years of the partition and introduced better curricula, revised under the Catholic Board of Education. This new school was named St Bonaventure's High School.

Once Pakistan acquired independence, it was clear that the nation would be an Islamic sovereign state, so a need arose for the gender-based separation of the coeducational school. The new wing founded for girls was named St Mary's Convent High School after Mary, the mother of Christ.

The Catholic Board of Education took charge of the development and running of the school and erected a church in the memory of Saint Francis Xavier for his services in central Asia and India. The church and the school buildings are regarded as cultural heritage monuments in Hyderabad.

Running under the Christian administration, the schools imparted very high standards of education to upper and middle class students until 1972, when these were nationalised over by the socialist government of Zulfiqar Ali Bhutto. It was not until 1992 that with the change of government the schools were denationalised and the ownership was returned to the Catholic diocese. Most Christian institutions in other parts of the country were denationalised in June 2001. Privatized again in the 1990s, the schools could not retain the quality education seen before nationalization and have not recovered yet.

== Organisation ==
=== Administration ===
The school is administered by the Catholic Diocese of Hyderabad. The day-to-day affairs and the running of the school is headed by the principal (currently Rev. Sr. Sarwat Iqbal FMM) while the administrative posts are usually overseen by lay members of the Church.

=== Teaching and facilities ===
The campus consists of three buildings with two paved playgrounds. It has biology, chemistry, physics laboratories and computer science teaching rooms. The school provides for the needs of students from religious minorities and has separate classes for non-Muslims and Muslims in order to equip them with knowledge of their respective religions.

The teaching standards accepted a blow during its nationalisation with a further setback when Islamic reforms were introduced in December 1982. The Christian administration was unsure how to go ahead with the new teaching curriculum but gathered teachers who could provide religious studies like Islamiyat. The school is an English-medium school, but had to incorporate teachings in both English and Urdu to provide education to a more diverse student population.

=== Student body ===
The school caters to students ranging from nursery up to the 12th grade, with each grade having three sections (A, B, and C). While the students are initially given places in the sections, they are further divided into four different houses namely Unity, Faith, Discipline and Truth after the pillars of Quaid-e-Azam. The house classification is mainly for sporting activities that include netball, table tennis, volleyball and athletics, and other extracurricular activities such as elocution, singing and debate competitions. Twelve office bearers are appointed every year from year ten who assist the principal and teachers in maintaining the day to day discipline of the school. These include a president and vice president who represent as spokespersons of the student body as a whole and are assisted by the other ten office bearers. As in the year 2004-2005 Versha Shardha and Warda Mateen were the president and vice president respectively who worked hard to maintain the discipline and inforce all the rules and regulation in the school. The remaining office bearers serve as presidents and vice presidents of the four houses, with two serving as president and vice president of sports. Each house also assigns 45 prefects based on academic and sporting excellence, who help maintain order in the school.

=== Student life ===
The school has affiliations with the Pakistan Girl Guides Association and enrols students to become girl guides who would indulge in activities like first aid trainings and organising rallies. Girl guides are awarded with honorary shields for valour at the end of their school terms.

The curricula includes sciences, mathematics, English, Urdu, Sindhi, religious education, social studies of Pakistan, computer sciences, physical training, home economics and arts as compulsory subjects until year eight. In years nine and ten, preference is given to science subject, whereas arts and humanities options are not available to students who may wish to opt for them. Non-Muslim Students are given the option to either take ethics and civics, whereas Muslim students attend Islamic studies classes by default.

Recreational activities include dramatics and music. The school does not have a dramatics club, however students take part in many plays organised by various teachers. The performances take place on either of the two stages on the school campus, one of which is indoors and the other outdoors. The school also has a marching band, which plays daily at the assembly and takes part in various competitions on a district and national level.

Two annual awards functions take place usually in January to award students and recognise them for achievements in academics and sports.
