= St. Mary's High School, Sukkur =

St. Mary's High School
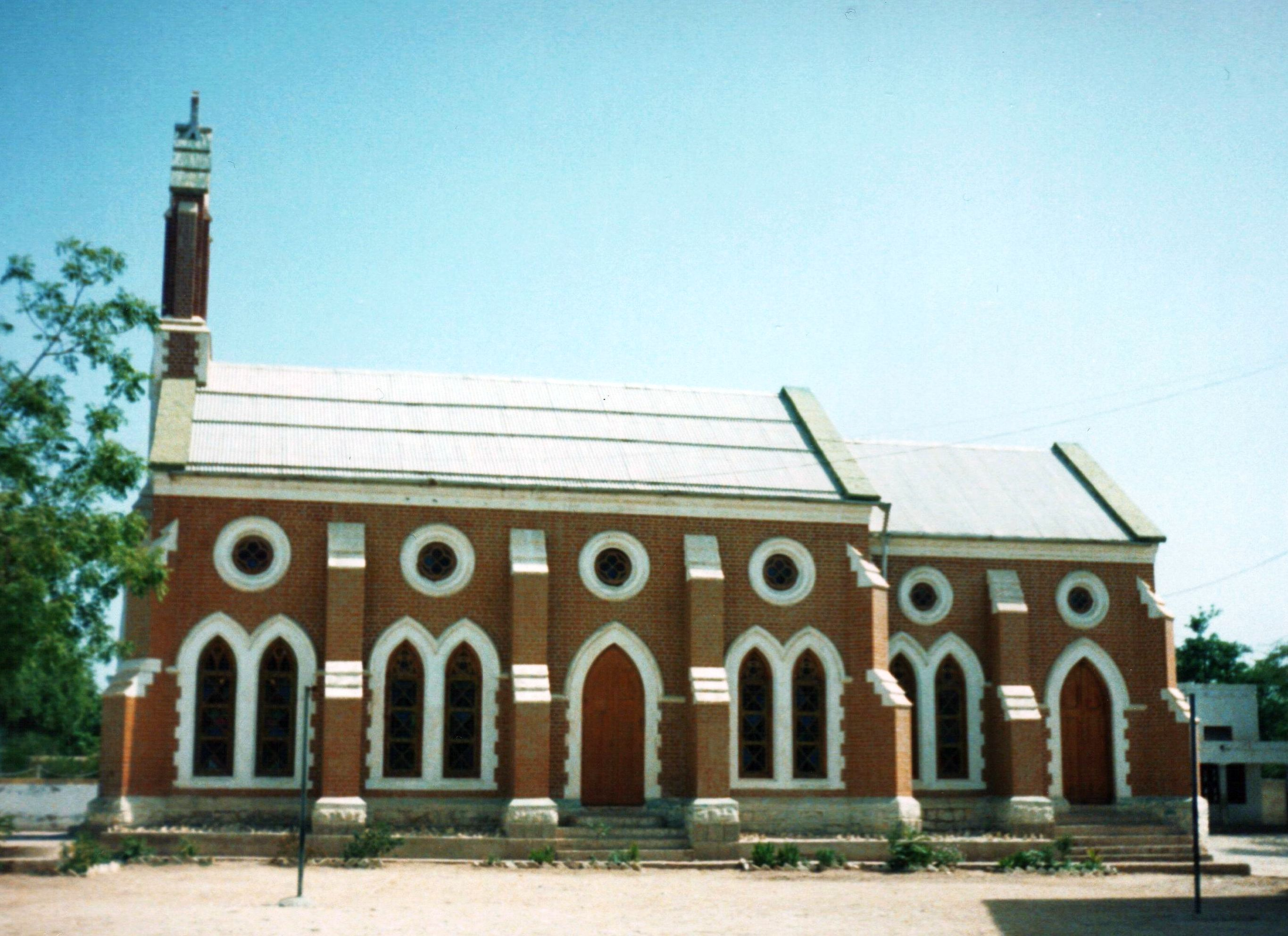
- St Mary's Catholic Church in Sukkur, in 1992

Location
- Sukkur, Sindh; Pakistan
- 27°41′51.3″N 68°52′11.5″E

Information
- Type: Private primary and secondary boarding and day school
- Religious affiliation: Catholicism
- Established: 1881 (145 years ago)
- Founders: Society of Jesus; Fr. Peter S.J.
- Local authority: Board of Intermediate and Secondary Education, Sukkur
- Oversight: Catholic Board of Education; Diocese of Hyderabad
- Principal: Sr Rosey Yacoob FMCK
- Staff: 75
- Age: 4 to 17
- Enrollment: 1,300
- Houses: Matric and Cambridge
- Publication: Maryian's World

St. Mary's High School is a private Catholic co-educational primary and secondary boarding and day school, located in Sukkur, Sindh, Pakistan. Founded in 1881, the school is administered by the Roman Catholic Diocese of Hyderabad in Pakistan.

The campus has 30 classrooms where, as of 2014, around 1,300 students were being taught by 75 teachers.

== History ==
In 1860, a few European and Goan Catholics came to Sukkur as railway employees. They requested the Archbishop of Bombay to assign a permanent priest. The first priest, Fr. Victor, was there for only a short while. In 1883, Fr. Peter S.J. became the parish priest. He felt that there should be a school where the children could get an education. So the Archbishop of Bombay requested the railway authority to construct a school.

The school was started in 1881, but it was not recognized until 1888. It was run by the Jesuits from 1 October 1888 to 1915 as a primary school, initially for the children of railway personnel, but in 1897 it was opened to all local people.

In 1902, there were only twelve students in five classes with one teacher. Due to the small number of students, the railway grant-in-aid was cut off on 9 May 1903. During the first twelve years, the number of students never increased beyond thirty.

In January 1889, a railway bungalow was given for the use of the school and a grant-in-aid of Rs. 20 was approved.

On 8 March 1911, railway authorities asked the school management to vacate the bungalow that was given for school use, as the railway department needed it for its own use.

The parish provided a building which opened as a school on 23 May 1911. In 1915, local clergy took over the running of the parish. The school again started receiving financial assistance from the railway on 29 April 1916. The education department recognized it on 28 July 1917. The number of students studying at that time was seventy-seven in seven classes.

Slowly growth in enrollment reached ninety-nine in 1930. In 1934, electric fans were installed offering some relief in the summers. In this year, the Sindh Mission was separated from Bombay Archdiocese. In 1935, a bus was sanctioned.

In 1940, the management was handed over to the Franciscan Missionaries of Christ the King. Sr. Lucy was appointed as the school's principal. The school prepared students for the Cambridge Ordinary level examinations only and there were 109 students. In 1949, the number rose to 252 students and 12 teachers were on the staff.

In 1942, a boarding option for girls was established. Sr. Lucy was principal followed by Sr. Clare in 1945. The school expanded to the matriculation level in 1950. That year, the principal saw the need for a primary Urdu school and on 13 October 1953 it came into existence. A boarding option was also started for boys.

In 1960, the management was handed to the Franciscan priests. In the early 1960s, Fr. John Baptist Todd took over as the principal. In 1963, a science laboratory was built. In 1970, Sr. Flavia FMCK was handed over the charge of the school.

In 1972, Zulfiqar Ali Bhutto, the Prime Minister of Pakistan, nationalized many private educational institutions including St. Mary's. The government returned the school to its original owners in 1990. Sr. Flavia returned as principal. But the condition of the school was terrible – it had been stripped and damaged. It was almost completely destroyed, both the building and academically.

=== Recent events ===
Sr. Rosey Yacoob took over as principal in 1992. With the support of the Roman Catholic Diocese of Hyderabad and Catholic Board of Education, the foundation stone of the new school building was laid in 1997 and the opening ceremony was performed in October 1998.

The newly constructed classrooms proved to be insufficient due to the increase in the number of students. Realizing the need for more classrooms, the foundation stone for a new wing was laid in 2000. On the first floor there are five classrooms and a conference room, while there is an auditorium on the second floor.

In April 2006, the convener of the standing committee on minorities of the National Assembly said that repair work on the damaged classrooms of the school would be started within a few days. The same year the school celebrated its 125th anniversary.

In 2010, the sisters of the School organized teams of volunteers to provide cooked food and water for hundreds of people affected by the floods in Sindh province. On 20 December 2011, Muslim, Hindu, and Christian students collectively organized a single event to celebrate Christmas, Diwali, and Eid in a display of religious solidarity.

In the year 2024, during Christmas season, the school administration along with the tireless efforts of the worthy principal Sr. Rosey Yacoob, the school organized a Grand Alumni Homecoming Reunion. Deputy Speaker of Provincial Assembly of Sindh, Mr. Anthony Naveed presided as the Chief Guest.

== Notable alumni ==
- Ahmad Faruqui – writer, defense analyst and economist.
- Aftab Manghi – film producer, writer and importer

== See also ==
- Catholic Church in Pakistan
- Education in Pakistan
- List of educational institutions in Sukkur
