= St. Francis Xavier Cathedral, Hyderabad =

Cathedral Church of the Roman Catholic Diocese of Hyderabad, Pakistan

Coordinates: 25.393287308001906°N 68.36709234110718°E

St. Francis Xavier Cathedral
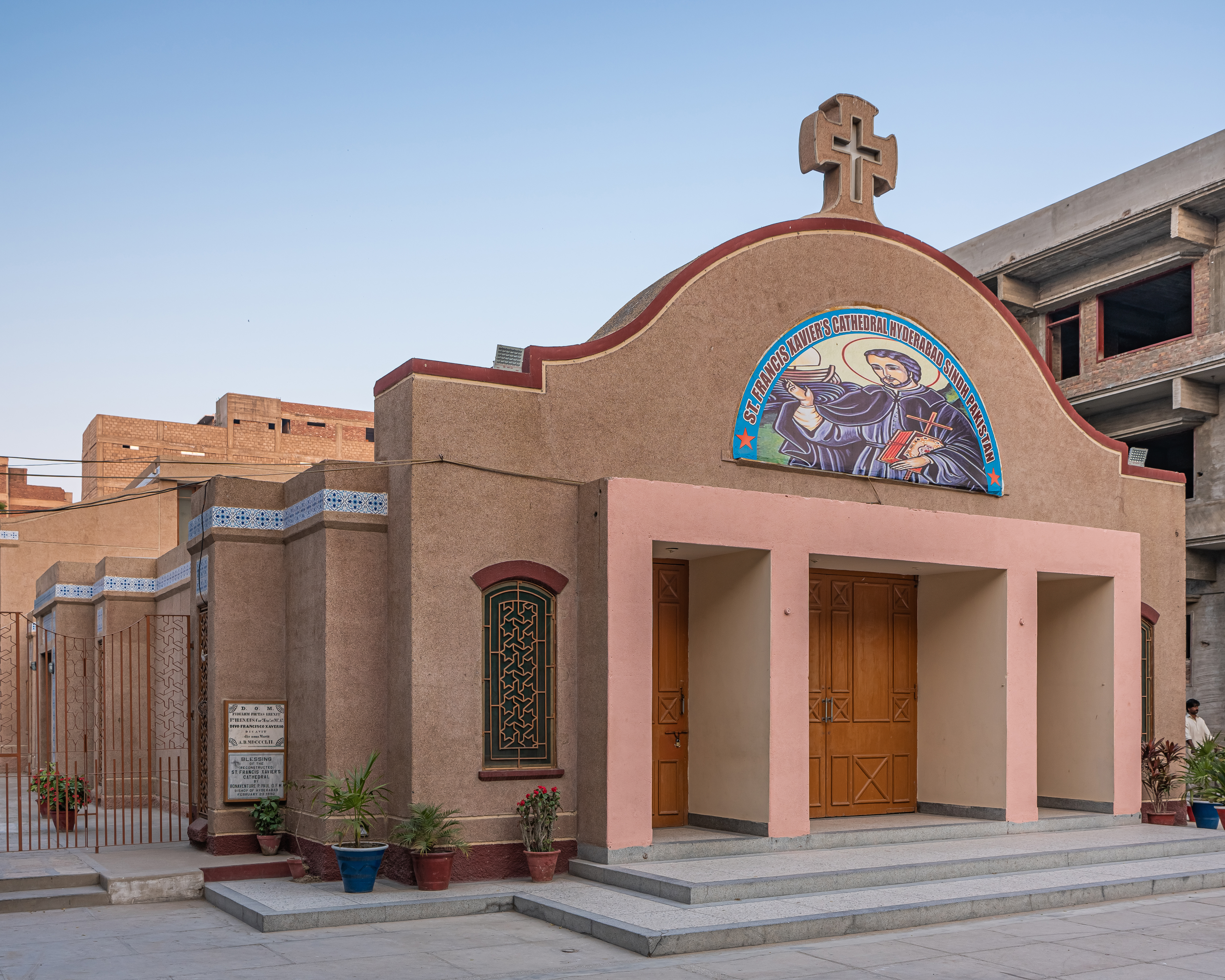
- St. Francis Xavier Cathedral, Hyderabad

Religion
- Affiliation: Roman Catholic
- Diocese: Diocese of Hyderabad
- Leadership: Bishop Samson Shukardin OFM; Fr. James Castellino , Rector & Assistant Perish Priest Fr. Sunil

Location
- Location: Hyderabad, Pakistan
- Interactive map of St. Francis Xavier Cathedral

St. Francis Xavier Cathedral, Hyderabad, Pakistan is the cathedral church of the Roman Catholic Diocese of Hyderabad, 1040 kilometers south of the capital, Islamabad.

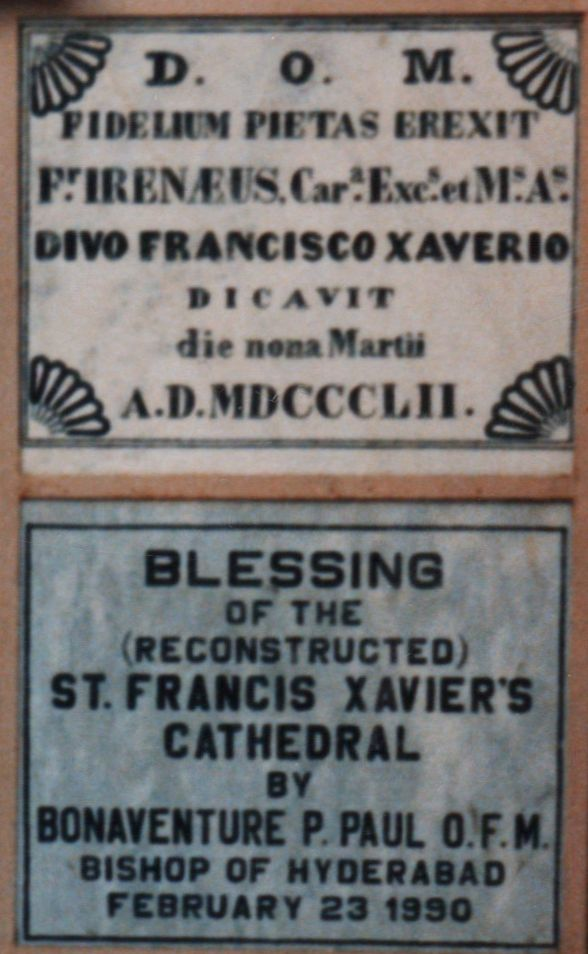
Plaque showing the foundation of the cathedral.

Father Francis Kotwani, the first Sindhi to be ordained a Catholic priest, served as assistant parish priest of the cathedral parish. He completed 50 years as a priest in 1994.

Bishop Max John Rodrigues of Hyderabad appealed for people to pray for the country at the conclusion of a special Mass at the cathedral, offered following a declaration of a state of emergency and a rash of arrests in the country in November 2007.

In September 2012, during global protests over the film Innocence of Muslims, during which Christian institutions and buildings were targeted, the cathedral was targeted by protesters. Fr. Samson Shukardin OFM, Vicar General of the Diocese, reported that a crowd went by St. Francis Xavier Cathedral, throwing stones and breaking windows. From the upper floors of some nearby houses, shots were also fired at the cathedral door.

In August 2020, Bishop Samson Shukardin OFM ordained to the priesthood Fr Sunil Ashraf and Father Perkho Sono OFM, in the cathedral.
