= Dave Brat =

American academic and politician (born 1964)

- Official portrait, 2026

United States Ambassador to Australia
- Incumbent
- Assumed office September 29, 2026
- President: Donald Trump
- Preceded by: Caroline Kennedy

Dean of the Liberty University School of Business
- In office January 2, 2019 – March 25, 2023
- Preceded by: Scott Hicks
- Succeeded by: Richard Diddams

Member of the U.S. House of Representatives from Virginia's 7th district
- In office November 4, 2014 – January 3, 2019 (Note: Brat's official service begins on the date of the special election, while he was not sworn in until November 12, 2014.)
- Preceded by: Eric Cantor
- Succeeded by: Abigail Spanberger

Personal details
- Born: David Alan Brat; July 27, 1964 (age 62) Detroit, Michigan, U.S.
- Party: Republican
- Spouse: Laura Sonderman (m. 1996)
- Children: 2
- Education: Hope College (BA); Princeton Theological Seminary (MDiv); American University (PhD)

David Alan Brat (born July 27, 1964) is an American politician, diplomat, academic, and economist who served as the U.S. representative for Virginia's 7th congressional district from 2014 to 2019. A member of the Republican Party, he was first elected in 2014 after successfully primarying House majority leader Eric Cantor despite being significantly outspent. Brat served two terms before he narrowly lost re-election in 2018 to Democrat Abigail Spanberger.

Brat came to national prominence when he defeated the U.S. House majority leader, Eric Cantor, in the 2014 Republican primary in Virginia's 7th congressional district. His primary victory, which he achieved with the support of the Tea Party movement, made Brat the first primary challenger to oust a sitting House Majority Leader since the position's creation in 1899. Brat went on to win the 2014 general election and was re-elected to Congress in 2016. During his congressional tenure, Brat was known as a conservative Republican and a member of the Freedom Caucus.

In January 2019, Brat was named dean of the Liberty University School of Business. In April 2026, Brat was nominated as ambassador of the United States to Australia. He was confirmed by the U.S. senate in August 2026.

== Early life and education ==
David Alan Brat was born in Detroit, Michigan, on July 27, 1964. His father, Paul, was a doctor of internal medicine; his mother, Nancy, was employed as a social worker in Alma, Michigan, where he was raised. His family moved from Alma to Minnesota when David, the oldest of three boys, was in junior high. Brat graduated from Park Center Senior High School in Brooklyn Park, Minnesota.

Brat earned a B.A. in business administration from Hope College in 1986, a master's degree in divinity (M.Div.) from Princeton Theological Seminary in 1990 and a Ph.D. in economics from American University in 1995.

== Academic career ==
After working for Arthur Andersen and as a consultant for the World Bank, Brat joined the faculty of Randolph–Macon College in 1996 as an economics professor. For six years, Brat chaired the college's department of ethics and business. At Randolph-Macon, Brat taught courses including "Britain in the International Economy", "International Economic Development", and "Business Ethics".

From 2010 to 2012, Brat headed Randolph-Macon's BB&T Moral Foundations of Capitalism program. Endowed by the BB&T Corporation, the program was one of 60 similar programs devoted to the study of capitalism and morality in philosophy and economics departments at U.S. universities.

In 2006, Brat was appointed by Virginia governor Tim Kaine to the Governor's advisory board of Economists. He has also served on the board of directors of the Richmond Metropolitan Authority, and on the advisory board of the Virginia Public Access Project.

In January 2019, following his defeat in the 2018 congressional election, Brat was named dean of the Liberty University School of Business. In May 2023, Brat became Vice Provost for Engagement and Public Relations at Liberty.

=== Scholarship and ideas ===
Brat has asserted that culture matters in economic markets. He believes that the culture that produced Adam Smith was a Protestant culture, and that the ethics of that culture are important in understanding market efficiency. Brat has advocated that Christians should forcefully support free-market capitalism and behave altruistically, in the manner of Jesus, so that "we would not need the government to backstop every action we take".

According to Kevin Roose in a New York Magazine article, Brat "sees free-market economics as being intricately linked to ethics and faith", and he makes the case that Adam Smith's "'invisible hand' theory should be properly seen in the context of Christian moral philosophy". Furthering the central theme of Max Weber's seminal book The Protestant Ethic and the Spirit of Capitalism, Brat argues in his 2004 paper Economic Growth and Institutions: The Rise and Fall of the Protestant Ethic? that "institutions such as religion, democracy and government anti-diversion policies all significantly enhance a country's long-run economic performance", and concludes that "the religion variable may be the strongest ex ante, exogenous institutional variable in the literature".

In a paper entitled Is Growth Exogenous? Taking Bernanke Seriously, Brat criticized Federal Reserve chairman Ben Bernanke. Brat asserted that Bernanke's work on economic growth overlooks the role of religious institutions—especially Protestant religious institutions—in a country's economic growth. Brat added that while savings rates, population growth, and human capital accumulation help drive economic growth, the larger factor is "the Protestant religious establishment", which Bernanke ignores.

Brat has blamed the rise of Adolf Hitler in Germany on the lack of "unified resistance", adding, "I have the sinking feeling that it could all happen again, quite easily". Brat believes that countries with Protestant histories have economic advantages over countries that do not have such histories, and that Protestantism "provides an efficient set of property rights and encourages a modern set of economic incentives" that often lead to "positive economic performance". He believes in Christ as a transformer of culture, and that world transformation can be achieved when capitalism and Christianity merge. Brat reasons that if people follow the Christian gospel and, as a consequence, behave morally, markets will improve.

In 2025, Brat defended President Donald Trump's tariffs, arguing that they were a necessary "attempt to put capital back in the hands of Americans."

== Early political career ==
Beginning in 2015, Brat volunteered as a special legislative assistant to Virginia state senator Walter Stosch, working on education issues.

=== 2011 Virginia House of Delegates campaign ===
In August 2011, Brat announced his candidacy for the Virginia House of Delegates seat for the 56th district. There was no primary, and six Republican leaders met and chose Peter Farrell as the Republican nominee for the November 2011 general election.

== U.S. House of Representatives ==
=== Elections ===
==== Republican primary ====
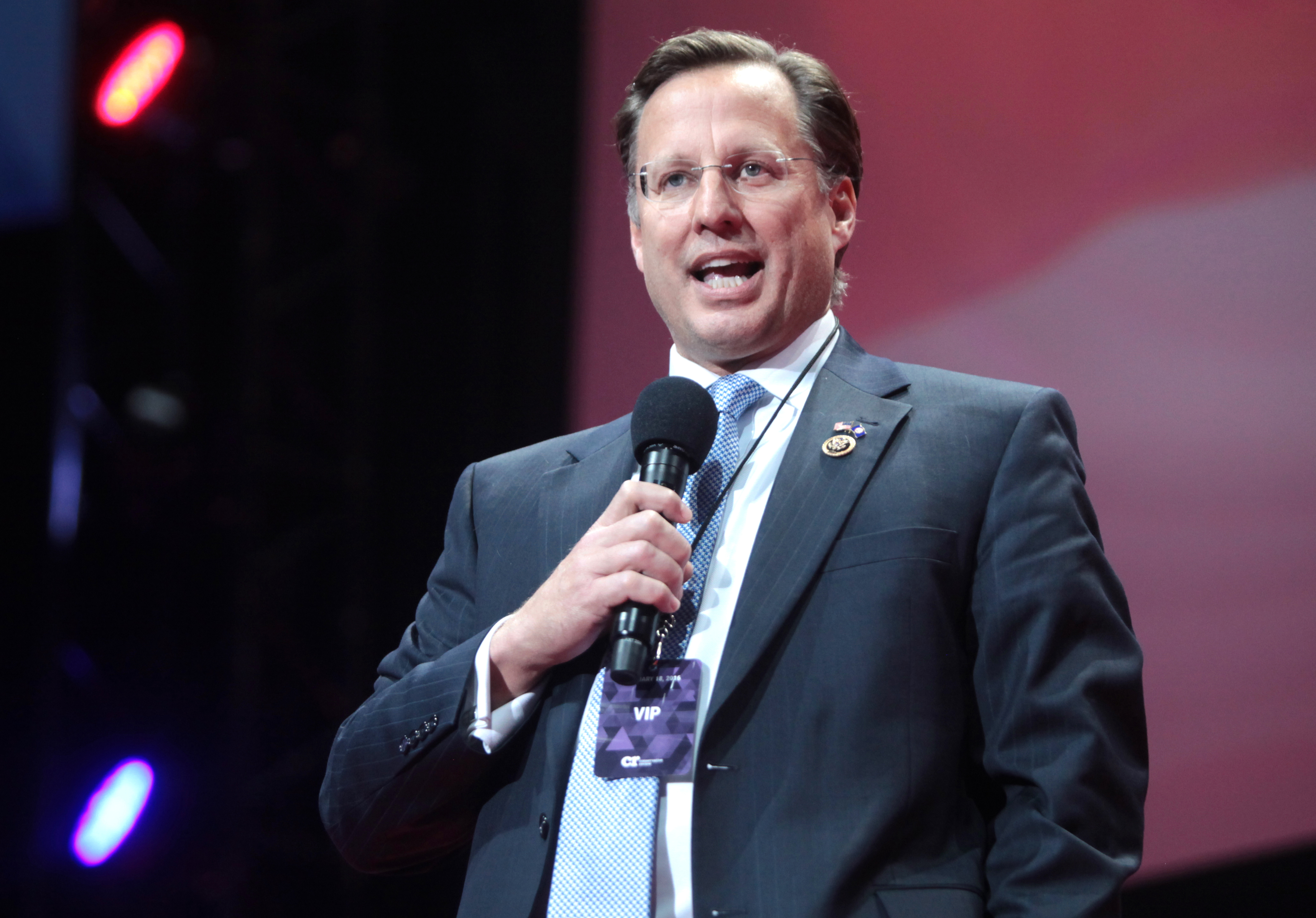
Dave Brat speaking at an event in February 2016.

2014 Republican primary results Brat: 50–60%; 60–70%; Cantor: 50–60%; 60–70%

In 2014, Brat challenged House Majority Leader Eric Cantor in a Republican primary. Brat's campaign was notable for its lack of resources and traditional campaign tactics. Brat was outspent by Cantor 40 to 1; Cantor spent over $5 million, while Brat raised $200,000 and did not spend all of it. Brat's primary campaign was managed by 23-year-old Zachary Werrell. An analysis of campaign filings conducted by OpenSecrets concluded that Brat did not receive any donations from political action committees (PACs); the analysis noted that it was "almost impossible to profile Brat's typical donor, because he had so few". On June 10, 2014, Brat defeated Cantor, 55.5% to 44.5%.

Brat's primary victory garnered national attention, as it was the first time a sitting House majority leader was defeated in his primary race since the position was created in 1899. The victory was regarded as a historic upset. Brat's victory was described in the press as exposing a "deep schism" in the Republican Party between its conservative base and its business wing, as well as a split between establishment Republicans and Tea Party insurgents.

Radio talk show host Laura Ingraham endorsed Brat's candidacy and hosted a rally with him in a Richmond suburb. Brat was also supported by radio talk show host Mark Levin and Ann Coulter. Brat received support from, and gave credit for his win to, local Tea Party groups in Virginia, but received no funding or endorsement from national Tea Party organizations. As of June 2014, however, Brat had not identified with the Tea Party movement. Ron Rapoport, a political scientist at the College of William & Mary, has said Brat may be correctly identified as a "tea partier" only if the term is used as a catchall for "anti-establishment activist", while John Judis has opined that Brat could more correctly be described as a "right-wing populist". Matea Gold in The Washington Post stated, "the fact that Brat took off without the help of those organizations [national tea party groups] now makes it harder for them to claim his victory as their own." Some libertarian groups, such as the Virginia Liberty Party, backed Brat.

Compared with Cantor, who was described as aloof, Brat was characterized as knowing how to work a crowd. He ran an anti-establishment campaign criticizing Cantor's position on illegal immigration, government bailouts and budget deals while frequently invoking God and the United States Constitution in his speeches. During the campaign, Cantor criticized Brat as a "liberal professor" who had strong ties to Tim Kaine, Virginia's former Democratic governor and current junior Senator. Brat complained that Cantor had a "crony-capitalist mentality", putting the interests of the corporate sector ahead of small businesses. Chris Peace, a state legislator who collaborated with Brat on state budget issues at Randolph-Macon College, said that Brat was inspired to run for Congress because of "his passion for the structure of government and belief in free markets."

Although the national media were shocked at Brat's victory, Richmond-area media outlets had received signs well before the primary that Cantor was in trouble. The Richmond Times-Dispatch reported two weeks before the primary that a number of Cantor's constituents felt he took them for granted. The Times-Dispatch also revealed that Cantor's attempt to brand Brat as a liberal professor actually made more people turn out for Brat. The Chesterfield Observer, a local paper serving Chesterfield County—roughly half of which is in the 7th—reported that Tea Party-aligned candidates had won several victories there, and at least one Cantor loyalist believed Tea Party supporters smelled "blood in the water." One local reporter told David Carr of The New York Times that many constituents believed Cantor was arrogant and unapproachable. Due to massive cutbacks, the race was severely underpolled by local media. Few Capitol Hill reporters were willing to go to Cantor's district for fear that they would be out of Washington if a major story broke.

==== General election ====
Brat faced Democratic nominee Jack Trammell, another professor at Randolph-Macon, and James Carr, a Libertarian candidate, in the November general election. Brat was favored to prevail because of the district's significant Republican enrollment advantage (the district had a Cook Partisan Voting Index of R+10, showing it to be the most Republican district in eastern Virginia).

Cantor announced plans to aid Brat by resigning from the United States Congress on August 18 so that a special election for the balance of Cantor's seventh term could be held on the same day as the general election for a full two-year term. Because of Cantor's move, the winner of the November election would take office with two months' more seniority than other first-term Republicans elected in the 2014 midterm elections. Furthermore, the winner would be able to participate in the 2014 lame-duck session of Congress.

Brat prevailed in the November 4 special election, winning 60.83% of the vote to Trammell's 36.95%.

==== 2016 ====
A court-ordered redistricting significantly changed the configuration of the 7th district. It lost its share of the city of Richmond to the neighboring 4th District; the 7th district and its predecessors had included all or part of Richmond for over a century (it had been numbered as the 3rd District before 1993). The district also lost Hanover County to the 1st District.

Brat defeated Democrat Eileen Bedell, 57.5% to 42.2%, in the general election on November 8, 2016.

==== 2018 ====
Brat ran for a third term in 2018 against Henrico native and former CIA officer Abigail Spanberger. The race was rated "Safe Republican" by the nonpartisan Cook Political Report until October 13, 2017, when Cook updated the rating to "Likely Republican." On February 8, 2018, the rating was changed to "Leans Republican," and on July 7, 2018, the race was rated a "Toss-up."

During an October 2018 debate, Brat characterized Spanberger as a disciple of Nancy Pelosi. Brat referred to Pelosi 25 times, according to The Washington Post, drawing laughs from the audience and the widely reported rejoinder, "Abigail Spanberger is my name."

Brat ultimately lost to Spanberger, 50.3% to 48.4%, due in part to a large swing in the district's shares of Henrico and Chesterfield counties, traditional Republican strongholds. While Brat carried five of the district's seven counties, Spanberger defeated him in Henrico and Chesterfield by a combined 30,600 votes, five times the overall margin of 6,600 votes.

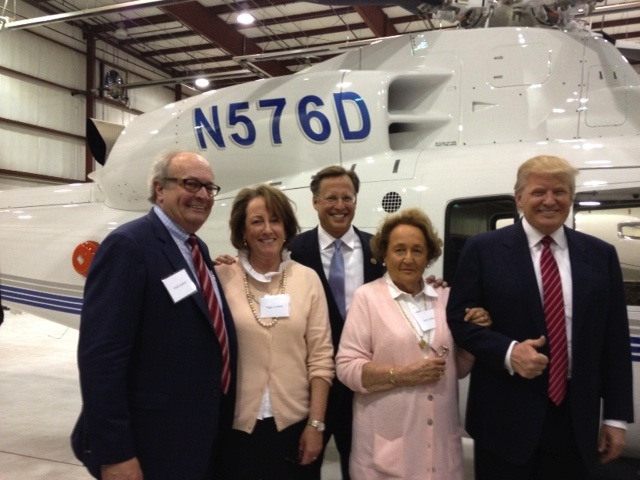
Brat with Donald Trump and supporters in 2015

=== Tenure ===
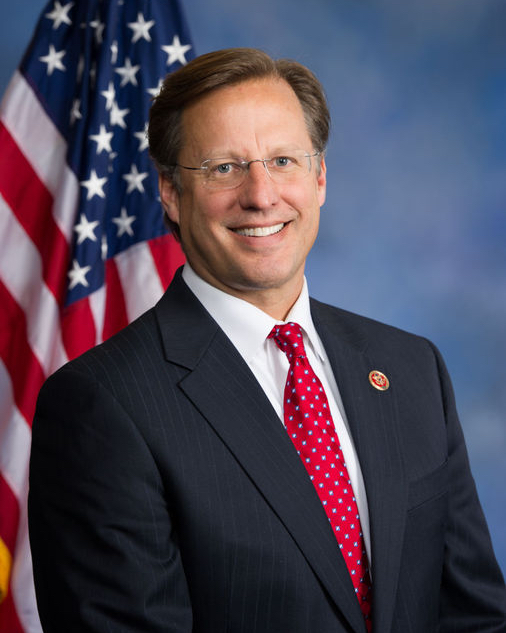
Brat's Official 2015 Congressional Potrait

Brat was sworn in on November 12, 2014, to finish Cantor's term. He was a member of the Freedom Caucus.

On January 6, 2015, Brat was one of 25 House Republicans to vote against John Boehner's reelection as Speaker of the United States House of Representatives. Boehner, who needed at least 205 votes, was reelected with 216 votes. Though Brat supported Boehner earlier, he reversed his support after the House GOP leadership did not allow him to make an amendment to block a controversial executive order signed by President Barack Obama in a spending bill.

Brat faced heckling by 150 people at a "raucous" town hall meeting in the small town of Blackstone, Virginia, on February 21, 2017. Some questioned him on the border wall, health care, and President Trump's policies. Several of Brat's supporters left the meeting early. He was criticized for not meeting with his constituents because he claimed there were paid protesters among them. On January 28, at a meeting held at Hanover Tavern with "the GOP-friendly audience", he had lamented that, "[s]ince Obamacare and these issues have come up, the women are in my grill no matter where I go. They come up — 'When is your next town hall?' And believe me, it’s not to give positive input." He also urged his fellow conservatives at the Tavern to write newspaper articles because "we’re getting hammered." Brat considered running in Virginia's 2018 Senate election.

In November 2017, the Richmond Times-Dispatch reported that a campaign staffer was using her personal Facebook profile to debate people who commented negatively on his Facebook posts. The woman did not identify herself as a paid campaign staffer. When asked about this, Brat said, "Her job is to clarify issues and put out my policy positions from my vantage point. It’s not to argue with people." Brat had another run-in with social media on March 1, 2018, when it was discovered that his campaign Twitter account had "liked" several controversial tweets, including one that questioned whether one of the survivors of the Parkland school shooting, David Hogg, was a "crisis actor". After an outcry from concerned constituents, Brat's office issued a statement that attributed the likes to a campaign staffer who believed they were logged into their personal account. He also said that safeguards were being put in place to ensure it did not happen again.

=== Committee assignments ===
- Committee on the Budget
- Committee on Education and the Workforce
  - Subcommittee on Early Childhood, Elementary and Secondary Education
  - Subcommittee on Workforce Protections
- Committee on Small Business
  - Subcommittee on Agriculture, Energy and Trade
  - Subcommittee on Economic Growth, Tax and Capital Access (chair)

== Political positions ==
=== Economy ===
Brat promised to vote against raising the debt ceiling for the first five years while he was in Congress, and attacked Cantor during the primary campaign for voting to end the federal government shutdown of 2013. Brat advocated an end to tax credits, deductions and loopholes, and called for a flatter and more efficient tax code. "I'm not against business. I'm against big business in bed with big government", he said.

Brat supported President Trump's trade policies, arguing that Americans benefited from re-negotiating NAFTA and that while tariffs on China would cause short-term harms, they would ultimately lead to "zero tariffs."

=== Education ===
According to the Washington Post, Brat opposed federally driven education policies such as the Common Core curriculum and No Child Left Behind. However, he expressed support for No Child Left Behind in his academic writings.

=== Ethics reform ===
Brat's decision to enter the 2014 Republican primary was driven largely by Cantor's role in weakening congressional ethics reform. "If you want to find out the smoking gun in this campaign, just go Google and type the STOCK Act and CNN and Eric Cantor", Brat said.

=== Healthcare ===
Brat opposed the Affordable Care Act (Obamacare). In March 2017, he said he opposed the initial version of the American Health Care Act, which was the GOP's replacement for Obamacare, and that he intended to vote against it in the House Budget Committee. On May 4, 2017, Brat voted to repeal Obamacare and pass the revised version of the American Health Care Act. He said the bill contained protections for preexisting conditions and would lead to lower prices; The Washington Post noted that the bill would have allowed insurers to charge higher premiums for individuals with preexisting conditions, and that an analysis by the Congressional Budget Office estimated that average health care premiums would increase as a result of the bill (more so for older Americans).

During his 2018 re-election campaign, Brat falsely claimed that The Washington Post fact-checker had given "four Pinocchios" to his opponent Abigail Spanberger for claims she made about Brat's position on health care.

=== Foreign policy and defense ===
Brat called for the National Security Agency to end bulk collection of phone records and stated his support for statutory protections for e-mail privacy. He argued that domestic intelligence activities have "spun out of control" and that "the NSA's indiscriminate collection of data on all Americans is a disturbing violation of our Fourth Amendment right to privacy."

In an April 21, 2015, interview with radio talk show host Rusty Humphries, Brat claimed that the terrorist group ISIS had set up a base in Texas. "In our country it looks like we have an ISIS center in Texas now...You can't make up what a terrible problem this is." After the Texas Department of Public Safety responded that there was no substantiation for the claim, Brat's office said that he had really meant Mexico, not Texas, citing the conservative group Judicial Watch, which declined to provide any substantiation for its report.

=== Immigration ===
Brat supported President Trump's 2017 executive order to temporarily curtail immigration from the Muslim-majority nations of Iran, Iraq, Libya, Somalia, Sudan, Syria, and Yemen until better screening methods are devised. Brat said that "the temporary halt on migration from seven countries will last only a few months until we have solid vetting procedures in place" and that "these seven countries with a temporary travel ban have been identified by both the Obama administration and our intelligence agencies as being the greatest threat to our national security because they have a history of training, harboring, and exporting terrorism."

In September 2017, Brat said that Deferred Action for Childhood Arrivals (DACA), which provided temporary stay for unauthorized immigrants brought to the United as minors, allowed minors to "bring in their entire extended family once they reach a certain status" and could bring in up to four million additional immigrants. PolitiFact disputed Brat's figure.

=== Social issues ===
In 2011, Brat criticized the political right for simultaneously advancing the pursuit of individual liberty while pushing laws restricting abortion, gay rights and gambling, and the political left for simultaneously supporting progressive liberal individualism while coercing others to "fund every social program under the sun".

Brat later claimed to be pro-life. He co-sponsored the Life at Conception Act and pledged to remove federal funding from Planned Parenthood.

=== Social Security and Medicare ===
Brat criticized both major parties' approach to Medicare and Social Security, stating, "neither side of the aisle will talk about the most important issues because that is going to involve pain." He advocated "market-based reforms" to these programs, arguing individuals ought not to receive more from programs than they have paid into them.

== Electoral history ==
Virginia's 7th congressional district Republican primary, 2014
Party	Candidate	Votes	%
Republican	Dave Brat	36,105	55.53%
Republican	Eric Cantor (incumbent)	28,912	44.47%
Total votes		65,017	100%

Virginia's 7th congressional district election, 2014
Party	Candidate	Votes	%
Republican	Dave Brat	148,026	60.83%
Democratic	Jack Trammell	89,914	36.95%
Libertarian	James Carr	5,086	2.09%
Write-in		325	0.13%
Total votes		243,351	100%
Republican hold			

Virginia's 7th congressional district election, 2016
Party	Candidate	Votes	%	±%
Republican	Dave Brat (incumbent)	218,057	57.71%	−3.12%
Democratic	Eileen Bedell	160,159	42.24%	+5.29%
Write-in		947	0.25%	
Total votes		379,163	100.00%	+135,812
Republican hold		Swing	N/A	

Virginia's 7th congressional district election, 2018
Party	Candidate	Votes	%
Democratic	Abigail Spanberger	176,079	50.3
Republican	Dave Brat (incumbent)	169,295	48.4
Libertarian	Joe Walton	4,216	1.2
Write-in		155	0.1
Total votes		349,745	100.0
Democratic gain from Republican			

== Publications ==
- God and Advanced Mammon – Can Theological Types Handle Usury and Capitalism? (2011)
- Brat, David A.; Kenneth Sands; Evan Dungan (2009). "NAEP Scores, Human Capital, and State Growth". Virginia Economic Journal. 14: 21–43.
- Park, Walter G.; David A. Brat (1995). "A Global Kuznets Curve?". Kyklos. 48 (1): 105. doi:10.1111/j.1467-6435.1995.tb02317.x.
- "All Democracies Created Equal? 195 Years Might Matter" (PDF). Randolph-Macon College. Archived from the original (PDF) on July 14, 2014.
- Brat, David (2004). "Economic Growth and Institutions: The Rise and Fall of the Protestant Ethic?". Virginia Economic Journal. 9: 33–40.
- An Analysis of the Moral Foundations in Ayn Rand
- Park, Walter G; Brat, David A (Summer 1996). "Cross-Country R&D and Growth: Variations on a Theme of Mankiw-Romer-Weil" (PDF). Eastern Economic Journal. 22 (3): 345–54. Archived from the original (PDF) on July 14, 2014.
- American Underdog: Proof That Principles Matter. Center Street. June 28, 2016. ISBN 978-1455539918. (2016)

== Personal life ==
Brat moved to Virginia in 1996 with his wife, Laura. They have two children.

Brat was raised in a Presbyterian church and his wife is a Roman Catholic. Splitting their time between two churches, they are parishioners of St. Mary Catholic Church in Richmond. Brat also identifies as a Calvinist and lists affiliations with Christ Episcopal Church, Third Presbyterian, and Shady Grove Methodist.

U.S. House of Representatives
Preceded by Eric Cantor	Member of the U.S. House of Representatives from Virginia's 7th congressional district 2014–2019	Succeeded by Abigail Spanberger
Diplomatic posts
Preceded by Erika Olson; Acting	United States Ambassador to Australia; 2026–present	Incumbent
U.S. order of precedence (ceremonial)
Preceded by Thelma Drake as Former U.S. Representative	Order of precedence of the United States as Former U.S. Representative	Succeeded by Barbara Comstock as Former U.S. Representative
