= Scoil Mhuire =

Scoil Mhuire (pronounced [ˌsˠkɛlʲ ˈwɪɾʲə]) is Irish for "Mary's school". It is a common name for schools named for Mary, mother of Jesus and may refer to:

== Schools in Ireland ==
- Scoil Mhuire, Buncrana
- Scoil Mhuire, Clane
- Scoil Mhuire, Cork
- Scoil Mhuire, Longford

== Other uses ==
- An old name for the village of Schull, County Cork, Ireland

== See also ==
- Scoil Mhuire CBS, Mullingar, former name of Saint Mary's Primary School in Mullingar, County Westmeath, Ireland
- St Mary's Grammar School (Scoil Mhuire Machaire Fiolta), Magherafelt, County Londonderry, Northern Ireland
- St. Mary's School (disambiguation)
- Colaiste Mhuire (disambiguation) (Mary's College)
- Mhuire (disambiguation)
