= Samson Shukardin =

21st-century Catholic bishop

His Grace P. Samson Shukardin OFM
- Bishop of Diocese of Hyderabad
- Church: Roman Catholic Church
- See: Diocese of Hyderabad
- In office: 2014 –
- Predecessor: Max John Rodrigues

Orders
- Ordination: 10 December 1993
- Consecration: 31 January 2015 by Max John Rodrigues, Joseph Coutts, Sebastian Francis Shaw

Personal details
- Born: 29 January 1961 (age 65) Hyderabad, Pakistan

P. Samson Shukardin, OFM (born 29 January 1961) is a Pakistani Catholic prelate who has served as Bishop of Hyderabad since 2014. He is a member of the Order of Friars Minor.

== Early life and education ==
Shukardin was born on 29 January 1961, in Hyderabad. After schooling at St Bonaventure's High School in Hyderabad and at Government Boys College, he entered the Order of Friars Minor.

In 1992, Shukardin graduated with a Bachelor of Arts degree from the Sindh University, Jamshoro, and later earned a degree in Theology at the National Catholic Institute of Theology in Karachi. In 1998, he completed a degree in Civil Law studies at the Sindh Muslim Law College.

== Career ==
Shukardin was ordained a priest on 10 December 1993. Since then he has served from 1993 to 1996 as assistant priest in Gujrat, Diocese of Islamabad-Rawalpindi; from 1996 to 2004 as Procurator of the Franciscan Province; from 2004 to 2008 as Guardian of the Franciscan Order and President of the Conference of Major Superiors of Pakistan; since 2008 as pastor of St. Elizabeth Church in Hyderabad, and Diocesan Director of the National Commission for Justice and Peace. Since 2010, he has been the Vicar General of the Diocese of Hyderabad.

In 2020, Shukardin became chairperson of the National Commission for Justice and Peace.

== Appointment ==
On 16 December 2014, Pope Francis accepted the resignation of Bishop Max John Rodrigues in accordance with canon 401 § 1 of the Code of Canon Law. The Pope then appointed Shukardin as the new bishop of the diocese.

Shukardin was consecrated bishop on 31 January 2015. The principal consecrator was Max John Rodrigues, Bishop Emeritus of Hyderabad, while the co-consecrators were Archbishop Joseph Coutts of Karachi and Archbishop Sebastian Francis Shaw of Lahore.

The Diocese of Hyderabad covers 137,000 square kilometers, with a population of 22,300,000 of which almost 50,000 are Catholic. It is served by 15 parishes, 30 priests, and 89 nuns.

== Recent events ==
Representing Pakistanis as president of the Catholic bishops conference of Pakistan, while speaking against discrimination against religious minorities, Shukardin told reporters on 10 December 2015, that Pakistan's human rights record was so poor that it was voted off the U.N. Human Rights Council.

On 1 December 2015, along with many other former students, Shukardin gathered at the Karachi Gymkhana to celebrate the 94th birthday of his former school teacher John Baptist Todd.

In August 2020, Shukardin ordained to the priesthood Sunil Ashraf and Perkho Sono, OFM, at St. Francis Xavier Cathedral, Hyderabad.
