= St Bonaventure's High School =

Location
- Foujdari Road, Saddar; Hyderabad, Sindh, 71000; Pakistan; 25°23′37″N 68°22′03″E

Information
- Former name: St Bonaventure's Boys' High School
- Type: Private primary and secondary school
- Motto: We hold the Fort
- Religious affiliation: Catholicism
- Established: 1920s–1930s
- Founder: Archilles Meersman
- Local authority: Catholic Board of Education; Board of Intermediate and Secondary Education, Hyderabad
- Oversight: Catholic Board of Education
- Principal: Saleem Anjum (City Branch)
- Gender: Boys (Saddar); Co-educational (Qasimabad)
- Age: 4 to 15
- Enrollment: Established 2,000 in City branch (usually 200 students per class of three sections each)
- Campus size: Saddar: 117,040 sq ft (10,873 m^{2}); Qasimabad: 88,610 sq ft (8,232 m^{2})
- Houses: Ayub; Jinnah; Liaquat; Tariq
- Colors: White, atomic tangerine and brown
- Affiliations: Aga Khan University; St Mary's Convent High School

St Bonaventure's High School (formerly St Bonaventure's Boys' High School) is a private Catholic primary and secondary school, located on Foujdari Road in Saddar, Hyderabad in the Sindh province of Pakistan. The school has another branch in the Hyderabad town of Qasimabad. The school is operated by the Roman Catholic diocese of Hyderabad.

== History ==
In the years between the 1920s and early 1930s the missionary establishments in the southern Indian subcontinent laid foundations for a school in Hyderabad run by the church to impart education to the masses. It was, however, during the years of the partition and the formation of the nation of Pakistan (1945–1948), Archilles Meersman, a parish priest, born to a Dutch mother and a Belgian father, at the Franciscan seminary at Karachi, built the new school. With deeply rooted Franciscan ideologies, Archilles named the school after the saint Bonaventure of Bagnoregio. Although some suggest that the school was named after the Rt. Rev. Bonaventure Patrick Pau], former bishop of Hyderabad. It was later given the status of a high school after the partition and was formally called St Bonaventure's High School.

The Catholic Board of Education took charge of the development and running of the school and erected a church in the memory of Saint Francis Xavier for his services in Central Asia and India. The church and the school buildings are regarded as cultural heritage monuments in Hyderabad. Formerly a coeducational institution, the school was divided into two schools, one for boys and one for girls named St Mary's Convent High School. Running under a Christian administration, the schools imparted education to upper and middle-class students until the 1970s when these were nationalised and taken over by the socialist government of Zulfiqar Ali Bhutto.

When in 1972, all privately owned institutions were nationalised under the Government of Pakistan, most lost their quality and charm. The government administration failed to deliver quality education through these schools. It was not until 1992 that with the change of government the schools were denationalised and the rightful ownership was returned to the Roman Catholic diocese. Most Christian institutions in other parts of the nation were denationalised later on in June 2001. Two former and longest serving principals Mr Bertram DeSouza and Mrs Angela DeSouza were former teachers at the school during the early 1960s and later married, becoming joint principals in the late 1970s, they retired in 2024.

== Qasimabad branch ==
The school administration expanded its operations in 1990 towards the town of Qasimabad and opened a branch there. Once built, St. Bonaventure's Qasimabad branch became one of the largest schools in the city. With its significant growth in educational services, Aga Khan University extended an offer for affiliation in 2007 for curricular material to be introduced to enable the school to attain the status of a college.

== Administration ==
The school is administered by the Roman Catholic Diocese of Hyderabad. The day-to-day affairs and the running of the school are headed by the principal, who is also charged with the recruitment of teachers and staff.

Fr. J. B. Todd OFM was first vice-principal and later principal of St Bonaventure's High School from 1958 to 1974. He was also instrumental in starting the school band in 1958.

Bertram DeSouza and Angela DeSouza are joint principals.

The office superintendent of the school is Mr Benedict Francis.

== Activities ==
Extra-curricular activities are organized annually and include drama, sports, Award Day, Pakistand Independence Day celebrations, and Eid Milad-un-Nabi. Annual competitions include debating (English, Urdu, Sindhi), elocution (English, Urdu, Sindhi), CSE (AKU-EB Section), science exhibition, singing competition, computer quiz and exhibition, and drawing contest. Based on the performances in academic and extra-curricular activities, houses are awarded an Honour Flag each month. Student groups include school prefects, Scouts and Cub Scouts, school band, gymnastics and houses.

== See also ==
- Christianity in Pakistan
- Education in Pakistan
- List of educational institutions in Hyderabad, Sindh
