= Colaiste Mhuire (disambiguation) =

Tourmakeady College (Colaiste Mhuire) is an Irish-speaking voluntary secondary school in Tourmakeady, County Mayo, Ireland.

Colaiste Mhuire may also refer to:

- Coláiste Mhuire, part of the Marino Institute of Education, affiliated with Trinity College, Dublin
- Colaiste Mhuire, Dublin
- Coláiste Mhuire, Mullingar, County Westmeath, Ireland
- Mary Immaculate College (Coláiste Mhuire gan Smál), Limerick, Ireland

== See also ==
- Mhuire (disambiguation)
- Scoil Mhuire (disambiguation)
