= John Baptist Todd =

John Baptist Todd, O.F.M. (30 November 1921 – 4 December 2017) was a Franciscan priest working in the Roman Catholic Archdiocese of Karachi in Pakistan. He was educated at St. Patrick’s High School and the University of Bombay. He received his religious training under the Order of Friars Minor and was ordained a priest in 1948.

One of his first assignments was as Prefect of Discipline at St. Patrick's High School, Karachi in the 1950s. Former President Pervez Musharraf attended St. Patrick's School in 1958–59. When he visited the school after becoming president, he recalled Todd giving him a sound caning for misbehaving. Musharraf subsequently presented a cane to Todd on the visit.

Todd was first vice principal and later principal of St Bonaventure's High School, Hyderabad from 1958–77. He was also instrumental in starting the school band in 1958. In the early 1960s, Todd took a break from St. Bonaventure's to act as the principal of St. Mary’s High School, Sukkur and also served as principal of St Francis Grammar School, Quetta. From 2000-06 he was vice principal of St. Patrick's School.

On 6 May 2011, the Old Patricians (former students of the school) presented the Father J. B. Todd OFM Gold Medal to the top student from the eighth grade at the closing ceremony of the 150th anniversary of the school.

On 18 March 2012, at the age of 91, he attended the Old Patricians' St. Patrick's Day Reunion dinner.

Among his former students is Bishop Samson Shukardin of Hyderabad. Along with many other former students they gathered at the Karachi Gymkhana to celebrate Todd’s 94th birthday.

== Death ==
Todd died in Karachi on 4 December 2017, five days after his 96th birthday. His funeral was held on December 6, 2017 at St. Patrick's Cathedral in Karachi. It was celebrated by Archbishop Joseph Coutts of Karachi and Bishop Samson Shukardin of Hyderabad.

== See also ==
- Portiuncula Friary
