= Temple, Texas =

- City
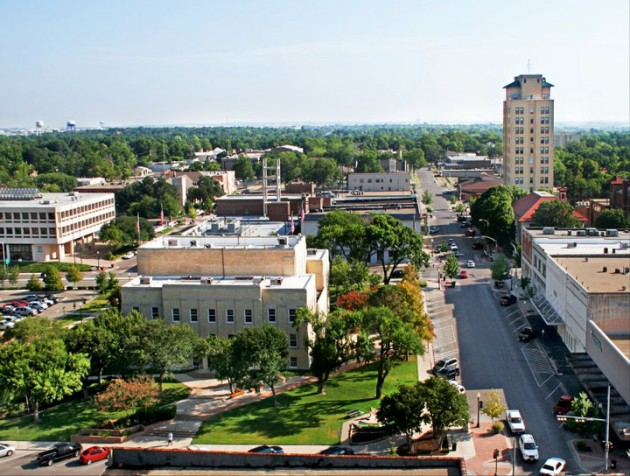
- Downtown Temple

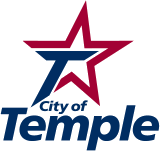
- Flag Seal
- Motto: Make Temple Great!
- Location within Bell County and Texas
- Coordinates: 31°5′48″N 97°20′28″W
- Country: United States
- State: Texas
- Counties: Bell
- Settled: June 29, 1881
- Incorporated: 1882
- Founder: Bernard Moore Temple
- Named for: Bernard Moore Temple

Government
  - Type: Council–manager
  - Mayor: Tim Davis
  - City Council: Members: Jessica Walker; Zoe Grant; Karl Kuykendall; Mike Pilkington
  - City manager: Brynn Myers

Area
  - Total: 76.00 sq mi (196.85 km^{2})
  - Land: 71.17 sq mi (184.33 km^{2})
  - Water: 4.83 sq mi (12.52 km^{2})
- Elevation: 607 ft (185 m)

Population (2020)
  - Total: 82,073
  - Density: 1,102.1/sq mi (425.53/km^{2})
- Time zone: UTC−6 (Central (CST))
  - Summer (DST): UTC−5 (CDT)
- ZIP Codes: 76501–76505, 76508
- Area codes: Area code 254
- FIPS code: 48-72176
- GNIS feature ID: 2412046
- Website: www.templetx.gov

Temple is a city in Bell County, Texas, United States. As of 2020, the city has a population of 82,073 according to the U.S. census. Temple lies in the region referred to as Central Texas and is a principal city in the Killeen–Temple–Fort Hood metropolitan area, which as of the 2020 Census had a population of 475,367. Located off Interstate 35, Temple is 68 miles (109 km) north of Austin, 34 miles (55 km) south of Waco and 27 miles east of Killeen.

== History ==
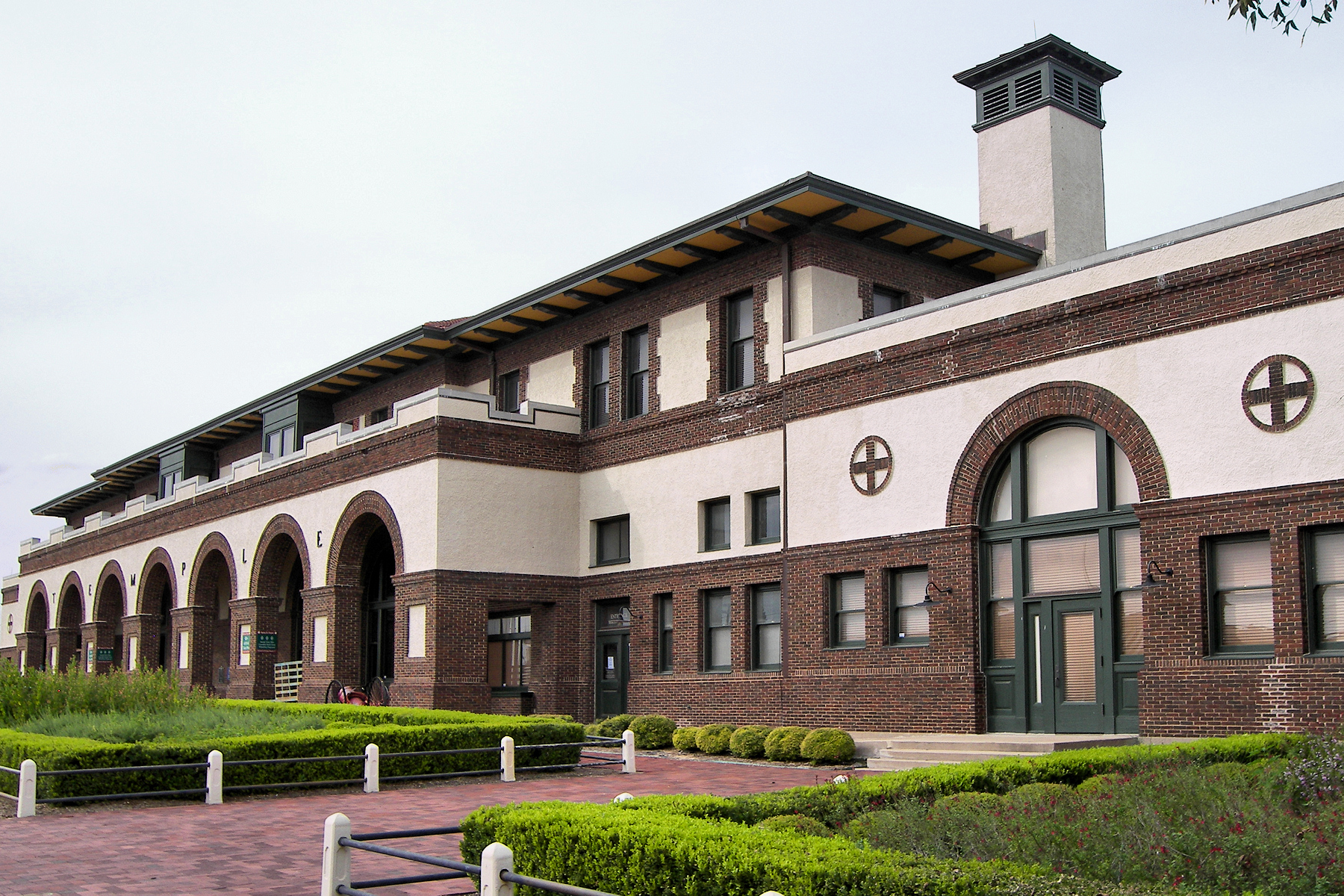
The historic Santa Fe Depot

Temple was founded as a railroad town by the Gulf, Colorado and Santa Fe Railroad (GC&SF). The settlement began in 1880 as a GC&SF construction camp called Temple Junction. In January 1881, a post office was established, and the settlement was officially named Temple, after Bernard Moore Temple, the chief civil engineer of the GC&SF. The town was incorporated in 1882.

Also in 1882, the Missouri, Kansas and Texas Railway built through the town, and soon after, the GC&SF made Temple a division point. In its early years, Temple was a town of shacks and tents with a large number of saloons and tough characters found in the early West. Locally, it was nicknamed "Tanglefoot" because some residents found that the combination of muddy streets and liquor made walking through the town challenging.

Very shortly after the town was incorporated in 1882, two private schools were founded in the city: the Temple Academy was organized and a public school was established in 1884. In 1893, the annual Temple Stag Party began, growing out of a private Thanksgiving celebration attended by some of the town's leading men. It was held until 1923.

The city became home to numerous medical clinics and the Santa Fe Hospital and Scott and White Memorial Hospital; the two hospitals merged in 1983 and now form the Baylor Scott & White Medical Center – Temple. Temple's position as the largest city in Bell County was earned largely on account of its medical facilities and its importance as a major railroad junction.

In 1886, the GC&SF was purchased by the Atchison, Topeka and Santa Fe Railway, popularly known as the Santa Fe Railroad or simply the Santa Fe. The Santa Fe's Temple depot was the site of the largest Harvey House restaurant in Texas, and the Harvey House organization also operated a dairy and vegetable farm near the city. Harvey Houses provided meals for Santa Fe passengers during stopovers and were also popular with local customers. The chain was famous for its high-quality food and its iconic uniformed all-female "Harvey Girl" waitstaff.

The Temple Railroad and Heritage Museum, on the second floor of the Santa Fe Railroad depot at 315 West Avenue B, commemorates the significance of railroads for the city and includes a large collection of Harvey House memorabilia.

== Geography ==
Temple is located northeast of the center of Bell County. It is the second-largest city in Bell County. It is bordered to the southwest, on the opposite side of the Leon River, by Belton, the county seat.

Temple is situated within a relatively short drive of most of the major cities of Texas: 124 mi north to Fort Worth, 130 mi north-northeast to Dallas, 65 mi southwest to Austin, 147 mi southwest to San Antonio, and 168 mi southeast to Houston. The city is located right on Interstate 35, running alongside the Balcones Fault with very varied geography. Towards the east lies the Blackland Prairie region (a rich farming area), and towards the west, the terrain rises with low, rolling, limestone-layered hills at the northeastern tip of the Texas Hill Country.

According to the United States Census Bureau, the city has a total area of 74.9 square miles (194 km^{2}), of which 70.1 square miles (182 km^{2}) are land and 4.8 square miles (12 km^{2}) are covered by water.

=== Climate ===
Climate data for Temple, Texas
Month	Jan	Feb	Mar	Apr	May	Jun	Jul	Aug	Sep	Oct	Nov	Dec	Year
Mean daily maximum °F (°C)	57 (14)	62 (17)	70 (21)	77 (25)	84 (29)	90 (32)	95 (35)	95 (35)	89 (32)	80 (27)	68 (20)	59 (15)	77 (25)
Mean daily minimum °F (°C)	35 (2)	39 (4)	46 (8)	54 (12)	63 (17)	70 (21)	72 (22)	72 (22)	66 (19)	56 (13)	45 (7)	38 (3)	55 (13)
Average precipitation inches (mm)	2.13 (54)	2.69 (68)	3.19 (81)	2.59 (66)	4.51 (115)	4.23 (107)	1.93 (49)	2.25 (57)	3.70 (94)	3.97 (101)	2.94 (75)	2.75 (70)	36.88 (937)
Source: weather.com

== Demographics ==
Historical population
Census	Pop.	Note	%±
1890	4,047		—
1900	7,065		74.6%
1910	10,993		55.6%
1920	11,033		0.4%
1930	15,345		39.1%
1940	15,344		0.0%
1950	25,467		66.0%
1960	30,419		19.4%
1970	33,431		9.9%
1980	42,483		27.1%
1990	46,109		8.5%
2000	54,514		18.2%
2010	66,102		21.3%
2020	82,073		24.2%
2024 (est.)	96,267		17.3%
U.S. Decennial Census

=== Racial and ethnic composition ===
Temple city, Texas – Racial and ethnic composition Note: the US Census treats Hispanic/Latino as an ethnic category. This table excludes Latinos from the racial categories and assigns them to a separate category. Hispanics/Latinos may be of any race.
Race / Ethnicity (NH = Non-Hispanic)	Pop 2000	Pop 2010	Pop 2020	% 2000	% 2010	% 2020
White alone (NH)	34,176	36,675	41,976	62.69%	55.48%	51.14%
Black or African American alone (NH)	8,818	10,815	12,031	16.18%	16.36%	14.66%
Native American or Alaska Native alone (NH)	200	226	281	0.37%	0.34%	0.34%
Asian alone (NH)	805	1,336	2,090	1.48%	2.02%	2.55%
Pacific Islander alone (NH)	33	72	158	0.06%	0.11%	0.19%
Some Other Race alone (NH)	56	68	354	0.10%	0.10%	0.43%
Mixed race or Multiracial (NH)	710	1,216	3,660	1.30%	1.84%	4.46%
Hispanic or Latino (any race)	9,716	15,694	21,523	17.82%	23.74%	26.22%
Total	54,514	66,102	82,073	100.00%	100.00%	100.00%

=== 2020 census ===
As of the 2020 census, Temple had a population of 82,073 and a median age of 35.9 years. 24.9% of residents were under the age of 18 and 16.0% of residents were 65 years of age or older. For every 100 females there were 91.6 males, and for every 100 females age 18 and over there were 88.5 males age 18 and over.

96.1% of residents lived in urban areas, while 3.9% lived in rural areas.

There were 32,558 households in Temple, of which 32.2% had children under the age of 18 living in them. Of all households, 43.9% were married-couple households, 18.6% were households with a male householder and no spouse or partner present, and 30.8% were households with a female householder and no spouse or partner present. About 30.2% of all households were made up of individuals and 11.1% had someone living alone who was 65 years of age or older.

There were 35,401 housing units, of which 8.0% were vacant. The homeowner vacancy rate was 2.5% and the rental vacancy rate was 8.8%.

Racial composition as of the 2020 census
Race	Number	Percent
White	48,353	58.9%
Black or African American	12,673	15.4%
American Indian and Alaska Native	731	0.9%
Asian	2,164	2.6%
Native Hawaiian and Other Pacific Islander	189	0.2%
Some other race	7,545	9.2%
Two or more races	10,418	12.7%
Hispanic or Latino (of any race)	21,523	26.2%

=== 2010 census ===
As of the 2010 census, 66,102 people, 23,359 households, and 15,878 families resided in the city. The population density was 834.2 inhabitants per square mile (322.1/km^{2}). The 28,005 housing units averaged 359.8 per square mile (138.9/km^{2}). The racial makeup of the city was 68.1% White, 23.7% Hispanic or Latino, 16.9% African American, 2.1% Asian, 0.6% Native American, 0.1% Pacific Islander, and 3.3% from two or more races.

Of the 23,359 households, 32.1% had children under the age of 18 living with them, 49.6% were married couples living together, 14.0% had a female householder with no husband present, and 32.0% were not families. About 28.4% of all households were made up of individuals, and 10.7% had someone living alone who was 65 years of age or older. The average household size was 2.44 and the average family size was 3.29.

In the city, the population was distributed as 24.1% under the age of 18, 9.2% from 18 to 24, 28.6% from 25 to 44, 20.0% from 45 to 64, and 15.8% who were 65 years of age or older. The median age was 35 years. For every 100 females, there were 91.7 males. For every 100 females age 18 and over, there were 87.2 males.

The median income for a household in the city was $47,240 and for a family was $42,795. Males had a median income of $30,858 versus $22,113 for females. The per capita income for the city was $25,740. About 10.8% of families and 12.5% of the population were below the poverty line, including 20.0% of those under age 18 and 9.8% of those age 65 or over. Temple's homeless population is approximately 1.9%. Assistance to the homeless is provided by Feed My Sheep and the Salvation Army.

== Economy ==
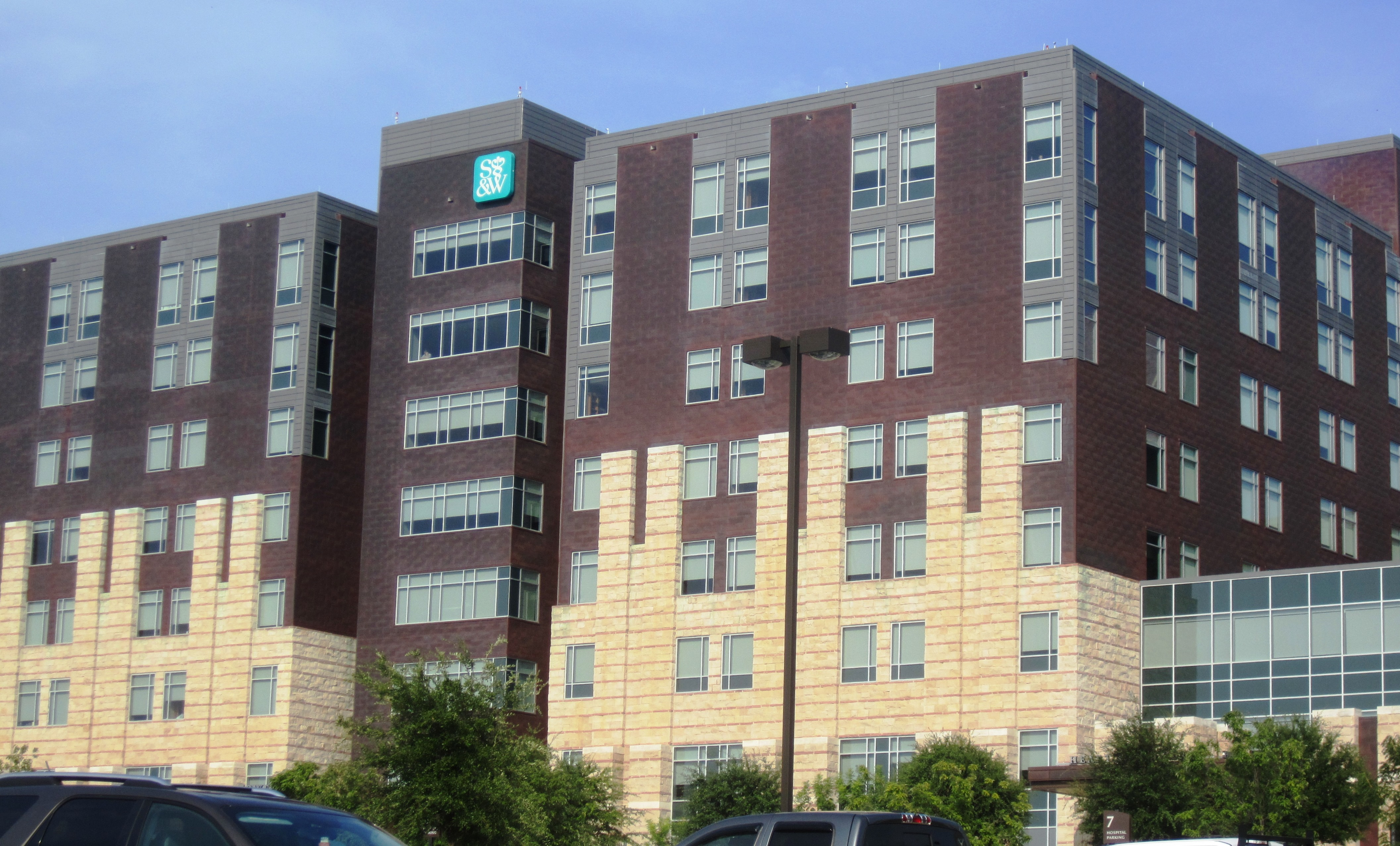
The Baylor Scott & White Medical Center

Over 100 years ago, the local economy began with the regional Santa Fe Railroad hospital. Temple now thrives in a complex economy, with both goods distribution and its reputation as a regional medical center leading the way. Baylor Scott & White Health is the largest employer in the area with about 12,000 employees, most located at Baylor Scott & White Medical Center – Temple.

Temple is home to many regional distribution centers and is headquarters to two large, multinational companies, Wilsonart International and McLane Company, as well as parent McLane Group. In addition to some manufacturing, also a developing customer service/ call center industry exists. Temple is also home to the Temple Bottling Company, which produces Dr Pepper (with Imperial Cane sugar).

Temple is within 30 miles (48 km) of Fort Hood and military personnel contribute a portion of the city's economy.

== Education ==
=== Primary and secondary schools ===
Temple is largely served by the Temple Independent School District. The district has one high school, three middle schools, nine elementary schools, and three supplemental learning programs (early childhood center, alternative learning center, and an innovative academy high school program). Students within the local school district attend Temple High School. In addition to award-winning academic and honors programs in arts and sciences and the International Baccalaureate (IB) curriculum, the high-school has a thriving athletic program. In addition, small portions of the city are served by Belton ISD, Troy ISD, and Academy ISD.

Several private schools serve Temple, including Christ Church School, Saint Mary's Catholic School (PreK–8), Providence Preparatory School (PreK-12), the associated Holy Trinity Catholic High School, and Central Texas Christian School (K–12).

=== Colleges and universities ===
Temple College offers two-year associate degrees in a variety of subjects, with strong programs in business administration, information technology, and nursing. Temple College was the first college located in Temple, and opened in 1926.

Temple is home to one of the Texas A&M College of Medicine campuses. It operates in conjunction with the Baylor Scott & White Medical Center – Temple and the Olin Teague Veterans' Hospital Center. The Baylor College of Medicine also has a campus in Temple affiliated with Baylor Scott & White Medical Center – Temple.

== Media ==
The main city newspaper is the Temple Daily Telegram. Radio stations licensed in Temple include FM stations KVLT-FM, KBDE-FM, KLTD-FM, and KRYH-LP; and AM stations News Radio 1400, and a number of other nearby radio stations can be heard in Temple. A number of broadcast television channels are available in the city: KCEN-TV (NBC), KWTX-TV (CBS/Telemundo), KXXV-TV (ABC), KNCT-TV (The CW), plus several alternate broadcast channels including MeTV, Cozi, Ion, MyNetworkTV, Grit, and local weather. For cable and satellite television service, Temple is served by Charter Spectrum (formerly Time Warner Cable), DirecTV, Dish Network, and Grande Communications.

== Infrastructure ==
=== Transportation ===
The Hill Country Transit District (The HOP) operates three bus routes within the city, with an additional bus connection to Killeen.

Temple was founded as a railroad junction and serves as a major freight railroad hub to this day. Both the Union Pacific Railroad and BNSF Railway have mainlines serving the city, and a BNSF rail yard and locomotive maintenance facility are located here. Amtrak serves the city with its Texas Eagle passenger train, which stops at the Temple Railway Station.

Temple has general aviation services via Draughon-Miller Central Texas Regional Airport. While commercial airline service is not currently available in the city, Temple is served by these nearby airports:

- Killeen Regional Airport in Killeen (32 miles west)
- Waco Regional Airport in Waco (44 miles north)
- Austin-Bergstrom International Airport in Austin (74 miles south)

==== High-speed rail ====
In 2009, the Texas Department of Transportation (TxDOT) proposed the Texas T-Bone High Speed Rail Corridor that would create a high-speed rail line from Dallas-Fort Worth to San Antonio and another line from Houston that would connect with the first line. While the location for the connection of the two lines had not been officially established, the mayor at the time, Bill Jones III, made an effort to ensure that connection happened in Temple. Temple would be a stop along the line, regardless of where that connection between the two lines would be. The next year in 2010, TxDOT received a federal grant to conduct a study for a line connecting Oklahoma City with San Antonio, and Temple was in the pathway of that line. In 2013, a consultant for the Texas High Speed Rail Corporation stated that the only two connections being considered for the two lines were a connection in Temple and a connection in San Antonio; they expected to make that decision by the end of 2014. The organization also indicated that they plan to have the high-speed rail in operation by 2025. If that connection occurred in Temple, the Killeen – Temple – Fort Hood metropolitan area, with a population of 420,375, would be within about 45 minutes of Dallas, Fort Worth, Houston, and San Antonio.

=== Health care ===
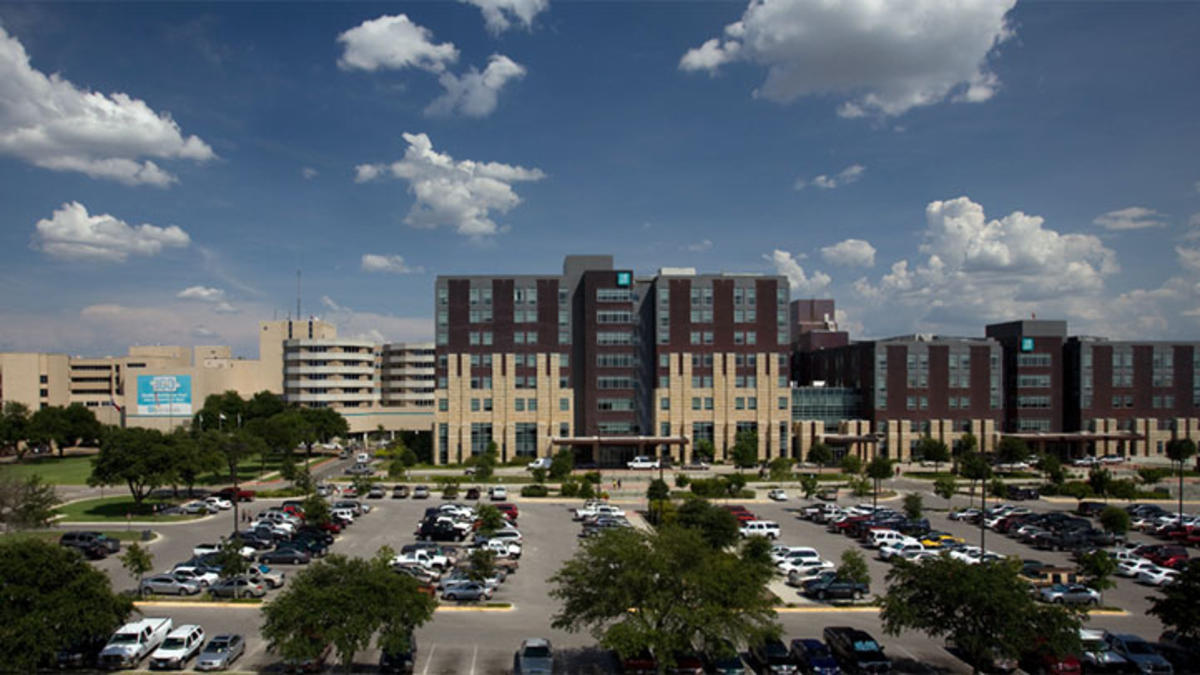
Baylor Scott & White Medical Center – Temple

Temple is known as a regional medical center, with four major hospitals: Baylor Scott & White Medical Center, Baylor Scott & White McLane Children's Medical Center, Olin E. Teague Veterans' Medical Center, and McLane Children's Specialty Clinic. Baylor Scott & White Health is the largest employer in town with over 11,000 employees.

=== Animal services ===
Temple Animal Services maintains an animal shelter, named Heart to Home Animal Adoption Center. It had renovations completed in 2023, with over 70 dog kennels instead of 30.

=== Texas State Soil and Water Conservation Board ===
The Texas State Soil and Water Conservation Board has its headquarters in Temple.

=== Law enforcement ===
Temple is policed by the Temple Police Department and the Bell County Sheriff's Office. The Texas Department of Criminal Justice operates a regional office in the city. The Texas Highway Patrol maintains an office on I-35 in Temple.

=== Postal service ===
The United States Postal Service operates a regional office in the city.

== Notable people ==
- Ki Aldrich, NFL Football Player
- Sammy Baugh, Hall of Fame football player for the Washington Redskins
- Britt Daniel, singer, songwriter, musician with Spoon
- Kenneth Davis, football player
- Brad Dusek, football player
- Gloria Feldt, author, women's rights advocate, former CEO and president of Planned Parenthood
- Forrest B Fenn, Vietnam veteran, art gallery owner, author, and creator of the Fenn treasure
- Brian Floca, author-illustrator and winner of the Caldecott Medal
- Noel Francis, actress
- Ryan Goins, MLB player
- Rufus Granderson, football player
- "Mean" Joe Greene, NTU graduate and Hall of Fame football player for the Pittsburgh Steelers
- Bernard A. Harris Jr., astronaut
- Jose Maria de Leon Hernandez, also known as "Little Joe", Grammy Award-winning leader of Little Joe y La Familia
- Logan Henderson, singer, songwriter, actor
- Walter Iooss, photographer
- Blind Willie Johnson (1897–1945), singer, songwriter, guitarist
- Quentin Johnston, football player
- George Koch (1919–1966), football player
- Drayton McLane, Jr., former CEO of McLane Company and local philanthropist
- Craig McMurtry, former pitcher for the Atlanta Braves and Texas Rangers, baseball coach for Temple College
- Eric Paslay, country singer
- Ted Poe, US congressman from the 2nd District of Texas
- Dan Pope, mayor of Lubbock since 2016; raised in Temple
- Andre President, football player
- Ben H. Procter, historian
- Bobby Lynn Shehorn, musician
- Jordan Shipley, NFL football player
- Bob Simmons, football player
- Brian Skinner, basketball player
- Mark Skolnick (born 1946 in Temple), geneticist
- Rip Torn, actor
- Paul White, racing driver
- Taurean York, football player
