= Naseem Nagar, Qasimabad =

Naseem Nagar is in Qasimabad and is said to be a busy route. It starts from the gate of Hyderabad and apparently it has no ending point because it is interconnected with few other areas of Qasimabad.

== Attractions ==
Nasim Nagar Chowk is the center of the area. A bus stop, rickshaw stop, hotels and shops are present. It used to be crowded, because of poorly designed traffic routes and because fruit and vegetable vendors occupied half of the road. In 2016 the roads were improved by constructing u-turns and the removal of the carts. Roopa Mari is a hotel situated at the beginning of Nasim Nagar. It recently added a banquet hall. Also, Neroon Kot is an old hotel and marriage site.

== Notable people ==
- Nuzhat Pathan is MPA for PML.

== Sources ==
- Hyderabad by Ishrat Khan.
- City of Hyderabad Sindh by Dr. Qamaruddin Bohra.
