= Arthur DesRosiers =

American architect

- Born: July 7, 1890
- Died: March 21, 1966 (aged 75); Southfield, Michigan
- Resting place: Holy Sepulchre Cemetery
- Occupation: Architect
- Children: 2 sons, 1 daughter

For the Canadian doctor and mayor, see Arthur Desrosiers.

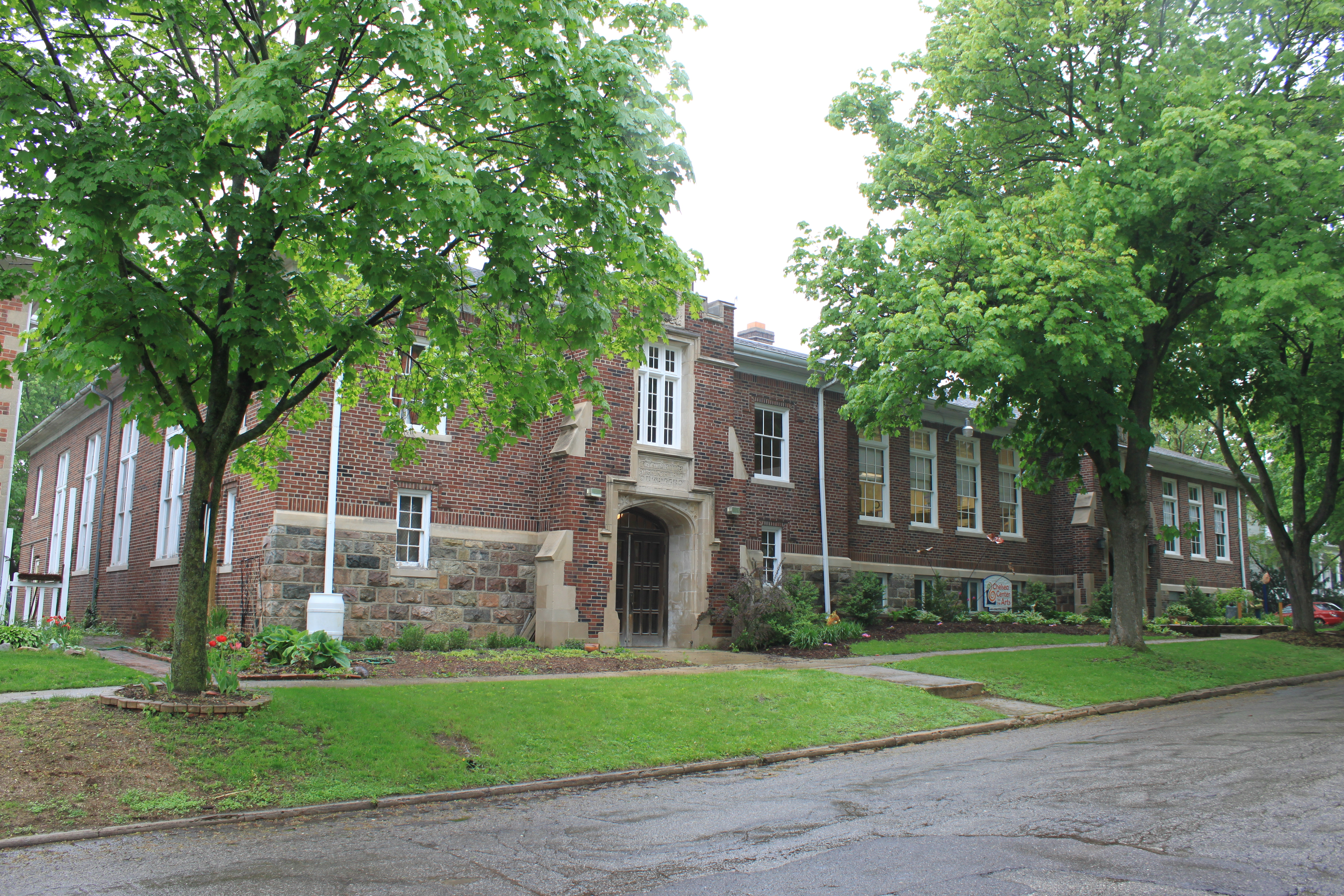
Saint Mary's School, designed by DesRosiers.

Arthur DesRosiers (July 7, 1890 - March 21, 1966) was an American architect who designed many Roman Catholic churches in Michigan, including St. Hugo of the Hills Catholic Church in Bloomfield Hills, St. Mary Queen of Creation Catholic Church in New Baltimore, St. John Catholic Church in Benton Harbor, St Denis Catholic Church in Lexington, and St. Adolphus Catholic Church, St Raymond's Catholic Church, St Lawrence Parish of Utica, and St Jude Catholic Church in Detroit. He also designed Saint Mary's School in Chelsea, Michigan, listed on the National Register of Historic Places since 2010.
