= Bobby Lynn Shehorn =

American singer-songwriter

Bobby Lynn Shehorn (born July 7, 1950) is an American singer-songwriter, author, and magazine editor.

== Early years ==
Shehorn was born and raised in Temple, Texas. He started playing French horn in the sixth grade, and began playing guitar professionally in 1965 in local clubs, school dances, and fraternity halls. In 1967 he began playing bass with a rock band based in Austin named South Canadian Overflow, alongside schoolmates John Inmon and Donny Dolan (both later members of the Lost Gonzo Band). South Canadian Overflow played in Central and South Texas, including the Vulcan Gas Company in Austin, where they recorded two unreleased tracks for Sonobeat Records on December 12, 1967, with Shehorn on bass.

== Career ==
After the demise of South Canadian Overflow and Shehorn's graduation from high school in 1968, he moved to Austin. In 1969, he met Bobby Charles, a Chess Records artist who had previously written music for Bill Haley and the Comets, Fats Domino, and Clarence "Frogman" Henry. After writing several songs together, they moved to New York City, ending up in Woodstock, New York, where Bobby Charles recorded an album for Albert Grossman's Bearsville Records, and Shehorn published one song with Grossman.

Back in Austin, Shehorn began performing as a bandleader and lead vocalist, while Rusty Weir, the Lost Gonzo Band and other artists were performing his songs. He worked as a producer in Austin's first 16/24-track studio and started Yellow Rose Records in 1974. He released the progressive country 45 RPM "If I Could Write a Song" backed with "Little Emily" in 1976. It featured two original songs with Shehorn as lead vocalist, playing guitar, bass and piano, accompanied by musicians including Marcia Ball. Shehorn moved back to Woodstock in 1981, and after performing on acoustic guitar, occasionally with banjo player Billy Faier, he cut his beard and trimmed his hair to reflect his change in genre. He formed the Bobby Shehorn Rockabilly Band with Jim Newton, Chris Zaloom, Thom Collins, and with Shehorn on bass guitar and lead vocals. Shehorn performed and recorded with many musicians Upstate and in New York City including Pee Wee Ellis, Howie Wyeth, Drew Zingg, Rick Danko and Paul Butterfield.

After a brief return to Texas and more gigs, Shehorn moved to Lafayette, Louisiana, in 1988. He became a regular at Tabby's Blues Box in Baton Rouge, where he performed alongside various Delta bluesmen, including Silas Hogan, Tabby Thomas, and Chris Thomas King. Back in Woodstock in 1989, his Bobby Shehorn Blues Band performed more in New York and the southeast.

Shehorn moved to Dallas after his last tour in 1990. Staying in one area for 15 years, he performed in Dallas alongside musicians including Sam Myers and drummer Tommy Hill. In 1997, Shehorn released the CD Bigger Than, with songs recorded in Dallas.

== Later life and writing ==
In 2005, Anchor Communications published his book Pioneer History of Dallas, Texas: A Masonic Prospective, 1848–1874, which was generally well-received. Shehorn was a guest speaker for many organizations and public events, including the Dallas Landmark Dedication Ceremony for Pioneer Cemetery, on May 25, 2003. Shehorn returned again to Austin, researching the history of tattooing for a book he was working on. This led to him writing for Skin&Ink, The Tattoo Magazine for four years, publishing his photos along with text in articles.

Settling in Austin, in 2005 Shehorn launched Texas Tattoo Magazine in 2008 as editor and principal contributor. In 2013, he released a CD, Still Called The Blues on his own Yellow Rose Records.
