= Scoil Mhuire, Cork =

Private school for girls in Cork, Ireland

Scoil Mhuire

Location
- Wellington Road, Cork, Ireland
- Coordinates: 51.902189°N 8.468021°W

Information
- Type: Private
- Motto: "Nurturing for Life"
- Religious affiliation: Roman Catholic
- Established: 1951
- Principal: Ciaran Quinton
- Enrollment: 400
- Website: Official website

Scoil Mhuire is a Catholic school for girls in Cork, Ireland. It was founded in 1951 by sisters Mary and Joan O'Donovan and their friend Kathleen Cahill. Joan O'Donovan would later become a religious sister in the Dominican Order. The school opened at 2 Sidney Place, Cork City, with 70 pupils aged from nine to seventeen years. In 1954, when Scoil Ite closed, most of its pupils and some staff transferred to Scoil Mhuire, which then became an all-age school from kindergarten upwards. Over the years, the buildings occupied by the school have been extended by purchasing adjoining properties. As of 2020, pupil numbers exceeded 400.

== Notable alumni ==
- Karen Creed, journalist
- Aoife Foley, Chair and Professor in Net Zero Infrastructure
- Clodagh McKenna, television presenter
- Siobhán McSweeney, actress
- Caroline O'Donoghue, writer
- Alison Oliver, actress
- Fiona Shaw, actress
