= Aoife Foley =

Irish engineer

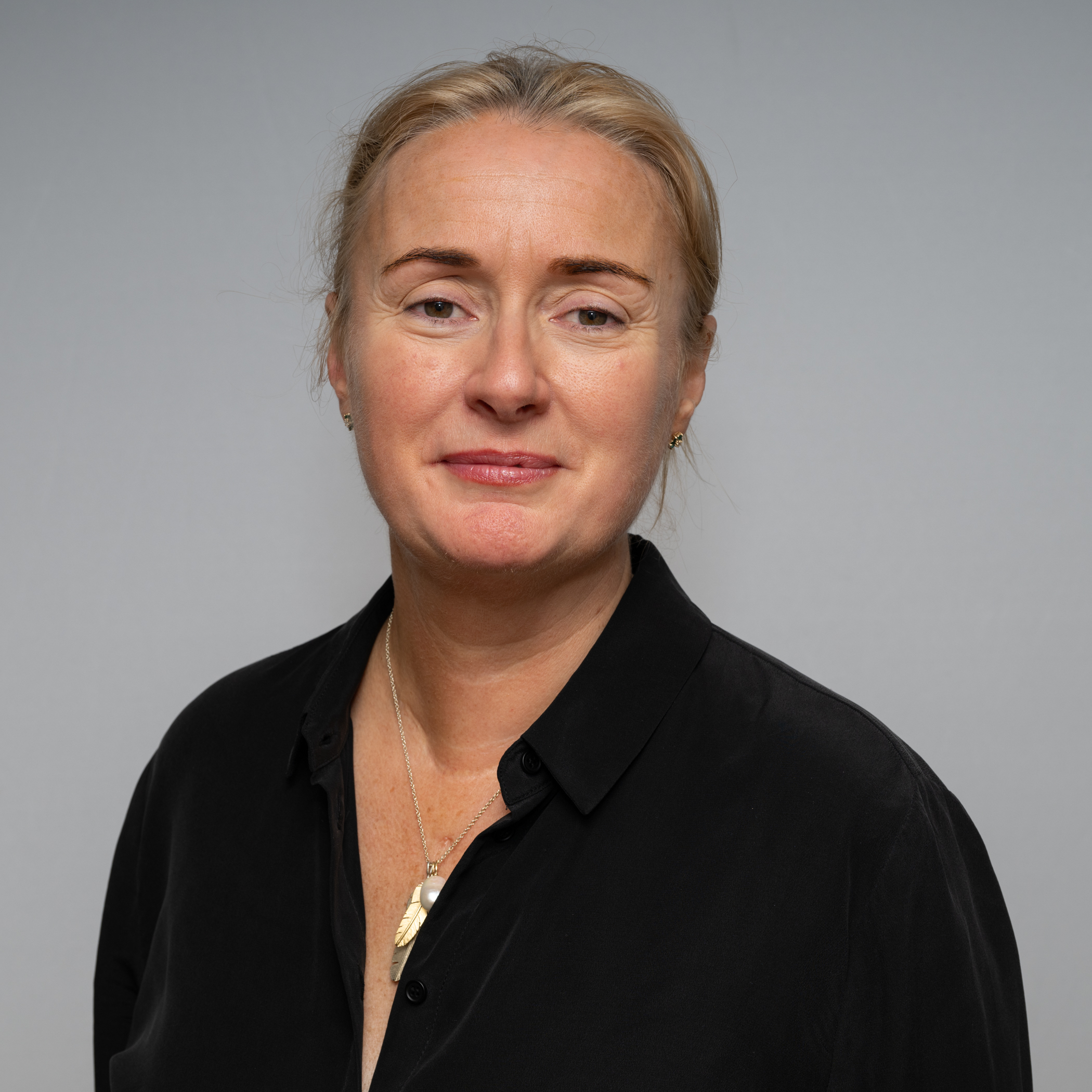
Image of Aoife M. Foley

Aoife M. Foley is an Irish and British engineer and was the Editor in Chief, Co-Editor in Chief and Editor (Wind) of Renewable and Sustainable Energy Reviews from 2014 to 2023 over which time the journal saw sustained growth, and an increase in impact factor from 5.9 to 16.3.

== Education ==
Professor Foley has a bachelor's degree in civil engineering (1996), and a PhD in energy engineering (2011) from University College Cork. She graduated Trinity College Dublin with a master's degree in environmental & transportation engineering (1999).

== Career ==
Foley joined the School of Mechanical and Aerospace Engineering at Queen's University Belfast in 2011 as a Lecturer. She was promoted to Reader in 2019 and to full Professor in 2022. In February 2023, she became chair in Net Zero Infrastructure in the School of Engineering at The University of Manchester.

Professor Foley's research work focuses on energy systems, transport electrification, renewable and sustainable energy integration, decarbonisation, infrastructure and techno-economics. She is an expert in application of her field towards the Sustainable Development Goals. One of her journal papers on wind forecasting from her PhD studies is one of the most highly cited engineering papers in the world, it is cited over 1,000 times and is cited 3 times in patents.

Before working at Queen's University, she worked at the University College Cork's School of Engineering as a lecturer and Senior Research Climate Change Fellow on a grant awarded to her by the Environmental Protection Agency.

Prior to joining academia she worked on energy, pharmaceutical, telecommunications, and waste projects for ESB International (engineering consultants), PM Group (project management company), Siemens, and SWS Energy (Irish energy company) for almost 15 years.

She was the Editor in Chief of Renewable and Sustainable Energy Reviews, serves on the editorial board of Elsevier's Renewable Energy journal and is an editor of Nature's Scientific Reports.
