= Saint Mary's School (Chelsea, Michigan) =

- U.S. National Register of Historic Places
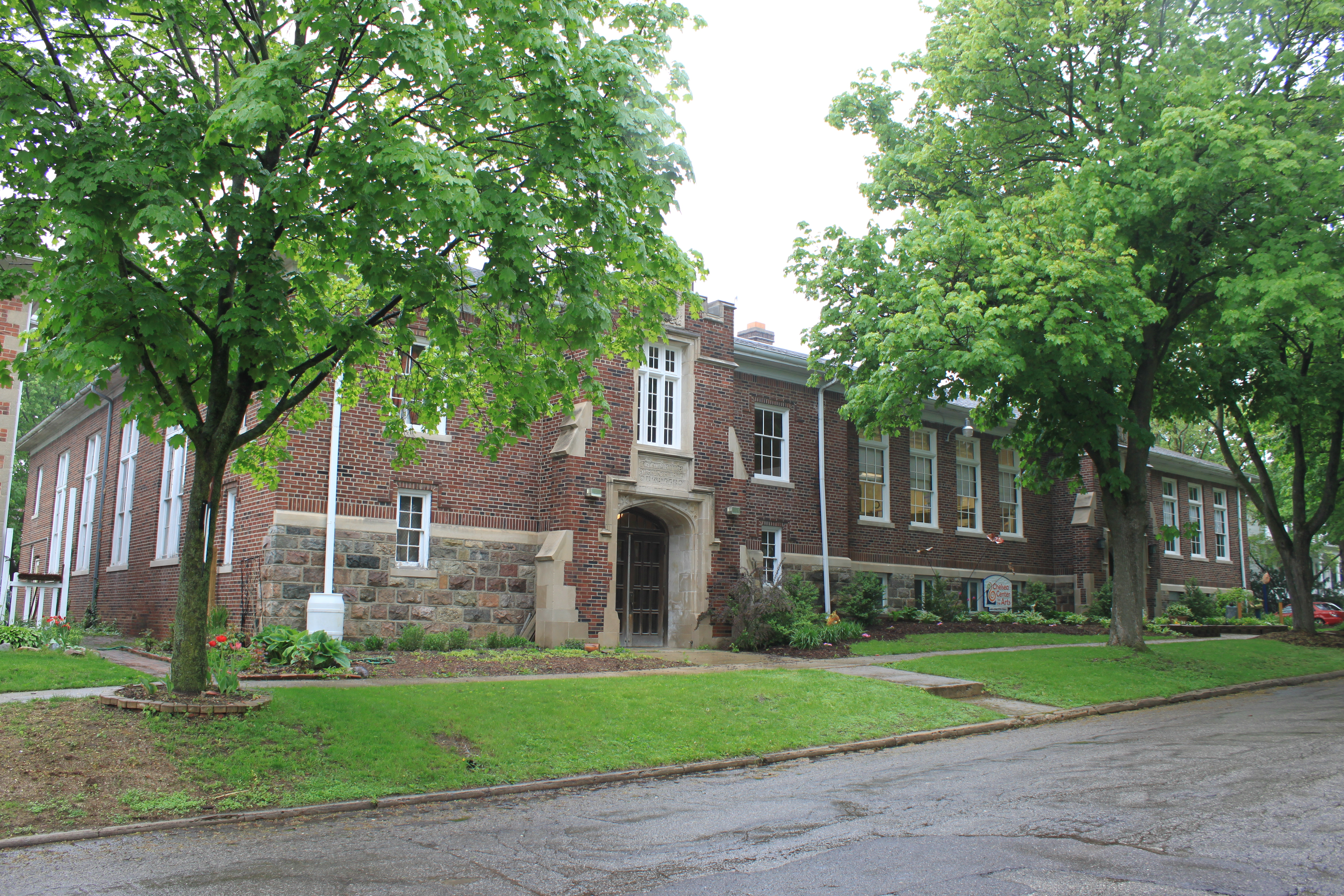

- Location within Michigan Location within the United States
- Interactive map
- Location: 400 Congdon St., Chelsea, Michigan
- Coordinates: 42°18′54″N 84°1′21″W
- Area: less than one acre
- Built: 1925
- Built by: George Talbot
- Architect: Arthur DesRosiers
- Architectural style: Gothic Revival
- NRHP reference No.: 10001026
- Added to NRHP: December 13, 2010

Saint Mary's School is a school building located at 400 Congdon Street in Chelsea, Michigan. It was listed on the National Register of Historic Places in 2010.

== History ==
In 1830, Irish Catholics first came to the Chelsea area. At first, masses were said in the homes of individual churchgoers, but in 1844, the mission of St. Mary of Sylvan was constructed. Masses were said irregularly until 1869, when a new church, known as Our Lady of the Sacred Heart, was constructed. The church gained parish status in 1878, and at some point in the early 1900s, the parish began using "Our Lady of the Sacred Heart" and "St. Mary" interchangeably.

The first St. Mary's School, located across the street from the rectory, was constructed in 1906 for first through eighth grade students. It was a two-story brick structure, with classrooms on the first floor and an assembly hall on the second. That building burned in 1925, likely due to a faulty furnace. The parish immediately began plans for a new school, hiring Detroit architect Arthur DesRosiers to design it and George Talbot as the contractor. The building was completed by November 1925.

By 1961, the parish church was deteriorating, and it was dismantled. The parish built a new church in another area. School attendance dropped, and in 1968 grades 7 and 8 were discontinued. The school closed completely in 1972. The parish used the school for educational and social purposes until 1998, when it built a new parish center for its educational programs. At that time, actor Jeff Daniels purchased the building from the parish and donated it to the Chelsea Center for the Development of the Arts. As of 2013, it is used as the home of the Chelsea Center for the Arts, with the Great Hall used as rehearsal space for the Purple Rose Theatre Company.

== Description ==
St. Mary's School is a two-story structure, constructed in an academic Gothic Revival style. It is built from brick with limestone trim, and contains a total of 13,745 square footage: 9,315 square feet in the school building and 4430 square feet in the adjacent Great Hall.
