= Max Rodrigues =

Catholic bishop

His Grace Max John Rodrigues
- Bishop Emeritus of Hyderabad
- Church: Roman Catholic
- See: Roman Catholic Diocese of Hyderabad (Emeritus)
- In office: 2000–2014
- Predecessor: Joseph Coutts
- Successor: Samson Shukardin, O.F.M.
- Previous posts: Principal, St Paul’s High School

Orders
- Ordination: 6 January 1966 by Pope Paul VI
- Consecration: 25 March 2000 by Simeon Anthony Pereira

Personal details
- Born: 29 May 1938 (age 88) Karachi, Pakistan

Max John Rodrigues was born in Karachi, Pakistan (then British India), on 29 May 1938. He entered the seminary in 1957 and spent seven years of his priestly formation at the Pontifical Urban University in Rome.

== Career ==
He was ordained a priest by Pope Paul VI at St. Peter's Basilica on 6 January 1966. Among his many appointments was serving as Assistant Parish Priest at Saint Francis of Assisi Parish, Karachi and Principal of St. Paul's High School from 1984 to 2000. On 3 December 1999 he was appointed Bishop of Hyderabad by Pope John Paul II, and consecrated on 25 March 2000 by Archbishop Simeon Anthony Pereira of Karachi in the presence of the papal nuncio to Pakistan. An apostolic letter from Pope John Paul II was read before the ordination.

He was one of the 6 delegates from the Pakistani Church participating in the Asia Mission Congress in Chiang Mai, Thailand, from 11 to 18 October 2006.

Rodrigues has worked on raising the status of women, who were often treated as chattels, and not educated. Attitudes changed, and girls are sent to school.

Rodrigues's resignation as bishop due to his age was accepted by Pope Francis on 16 December 2014; that same day, Pope Francis appointed the Diocese's Vicar General, a Franciscan, Samson Shukardin OFM, VG, as Bishop-elect of the Diocese of Hyderabad.

On 31 January 2015, he was the principal consecrator of his successor Shukardin.
