= St. Mary's Catholic School (Temple, Texas) =

Roman Catholic school in Temple, Texas, United States

Location
- 1019 South 7th Street; Temple, Texas; United States; 31.087649°N 97.348267°W

Information
- Type: Roman Catholic.
- Patron saint: St Mary
- Established: 1897
- Colours: Royal blue and white
- Mascot: Fluffules the Falcon

St. Mary's Catholic School, or SMCS, is a Roman Catholic co-educational school, PreK-8, located in Temple, Texas.
