= Saint Mary High School (Guachipelin) =

Private high school in Costa Rica

Saint Mary High School is a private high school located in Guachipelin, Costa Rica. This school was founded in 1979. It is considered to be a bilingual school, which includes classes in English and Spanish. It contains grades 7th-11th, which is considered high school in Costa Rica.

== Scheduling ==
The school runs on a rotating five-day schedule with periods lasting 45 minutes each. The grades are divided into two groups of roughly 22 students in each. These groups rotate throughout the periods together and have different schedules for every day of the week. Its passing periods between classes are three minutes each. The school has three breaks, which are of 15, 15 minutes, and a thirty-minute lunch. The year is divided into trimesters and have three weeks of vacation in July and two months and a half in December.

== Extracurricular ==
The school has a lot of extra curricular activities such as: soccer (boys and girls), basketball, volleyball (girls and boys), chess, and band. Also the school has elective classes which are some of the activities mentioned above but are taken as a normal course on your class schedule. Some of these classes include: guitar, community service, art, advanced French, leadership, chocolate shop, physical training, teamwork, ceramics, and computers.
