= Coláiste Mhuire, Dublin =

School in Dublin, Ireland

Coláiste Mhuire
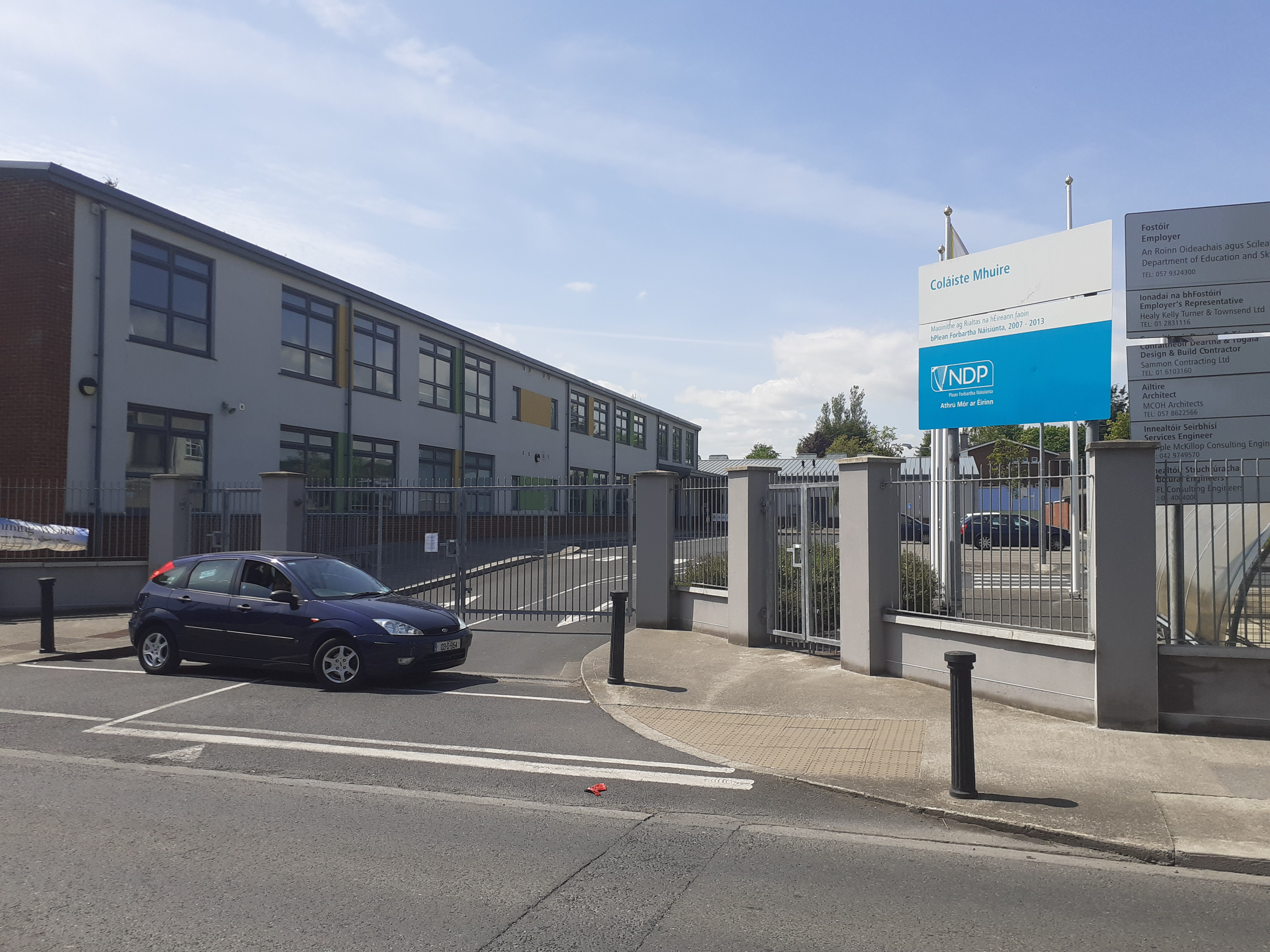
- The gates to Coláiste Mhuire in 2020

Location
- Ratoath Road; Dublin D07 CY97; Ireland
- 53.3661°N 6.3023°W

Information
- Type: Voluntary secondary school
- Principal: Oisín Mac Eoin
- Gender: Mixed
- Affiliation: Catholic
- Website: http://colaistemhuire.ie/

Coláiste Mhuire is a mixed-gender Catholic gaelscoil in Dublin, Ireland.

From 1933 to 2002, the school was based at Parnell Square in central Dublin before moving to its new campus in Cabra.

== History ==
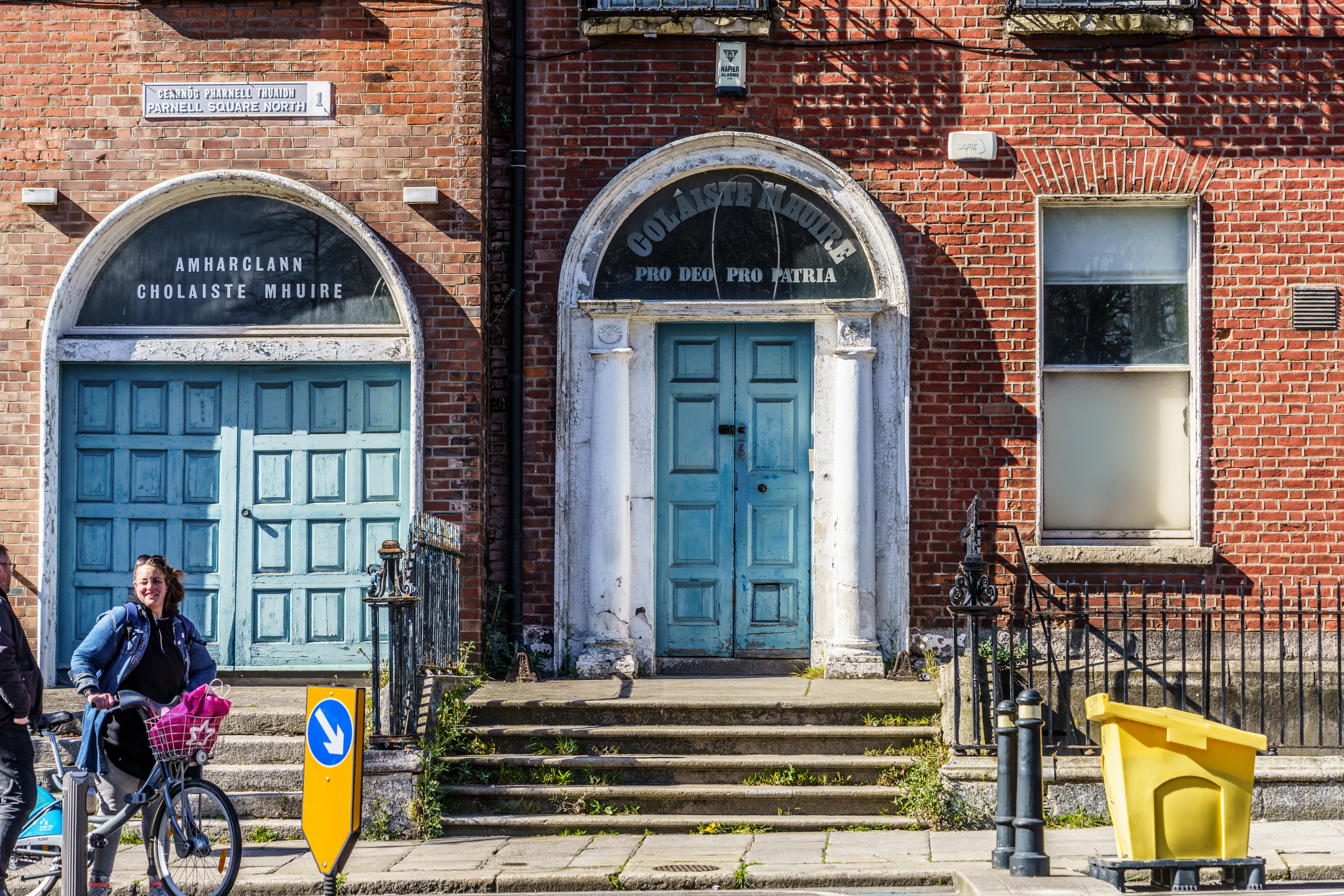
The doors to Coláiste Mhuire at their former location on Parnell Square North

The school was established in Harcourt Street, Dublin 1931 by the Irish Christian Brothers. It moved to Parnell Square, Dublin two years later expanding to other buildings on the north-western corner of the Square.

Originally an all-boys school, in the 1990s the school began to accept girls for the first time.

In 2002, the secondary school relocated to a new campus in Cabra in view of the poor condition of the Parnell Square buildings, while the primary school children moved to 7 Parnell Square East.

In 2007, the school began operating under the trusteeship of the Edmund Rice Schools Trust.

== Academics ==
The school offers a broad curriculum and a range of extracurricular activities. The school provides the Junior Certificate, an optional Transition Year (TY) programme, the Leaving Certificate Vocational Programme (LCVP) and the established Leaving Certificate.

Pupils from the school won the overall prize at the Young Scientist and Technology Exhibition in 1972 and 1977.

== Notable alumni ==
- James Connolly (1923-2022) - brigadier general; grandson of Irish independence leader James Connolly
- P. J. Mara (1942–2016) - public affairs consultant; advisor to Charles Haughey
- Alan Dukes (born 1945) - Fine Gael politician; government minister
- Cathal Mac Coille (born 1952) - broadcaster and journalist
- Brian Mullins (1954-2022) - Irish Gaelic football manager and player
- Des Cahill (born 1959) - sports broadcaster
