= St. Mary's Catholic School (Richmond, Virginia) =

Coordinates: 37°36′6.7″N 77°35′11.1″W

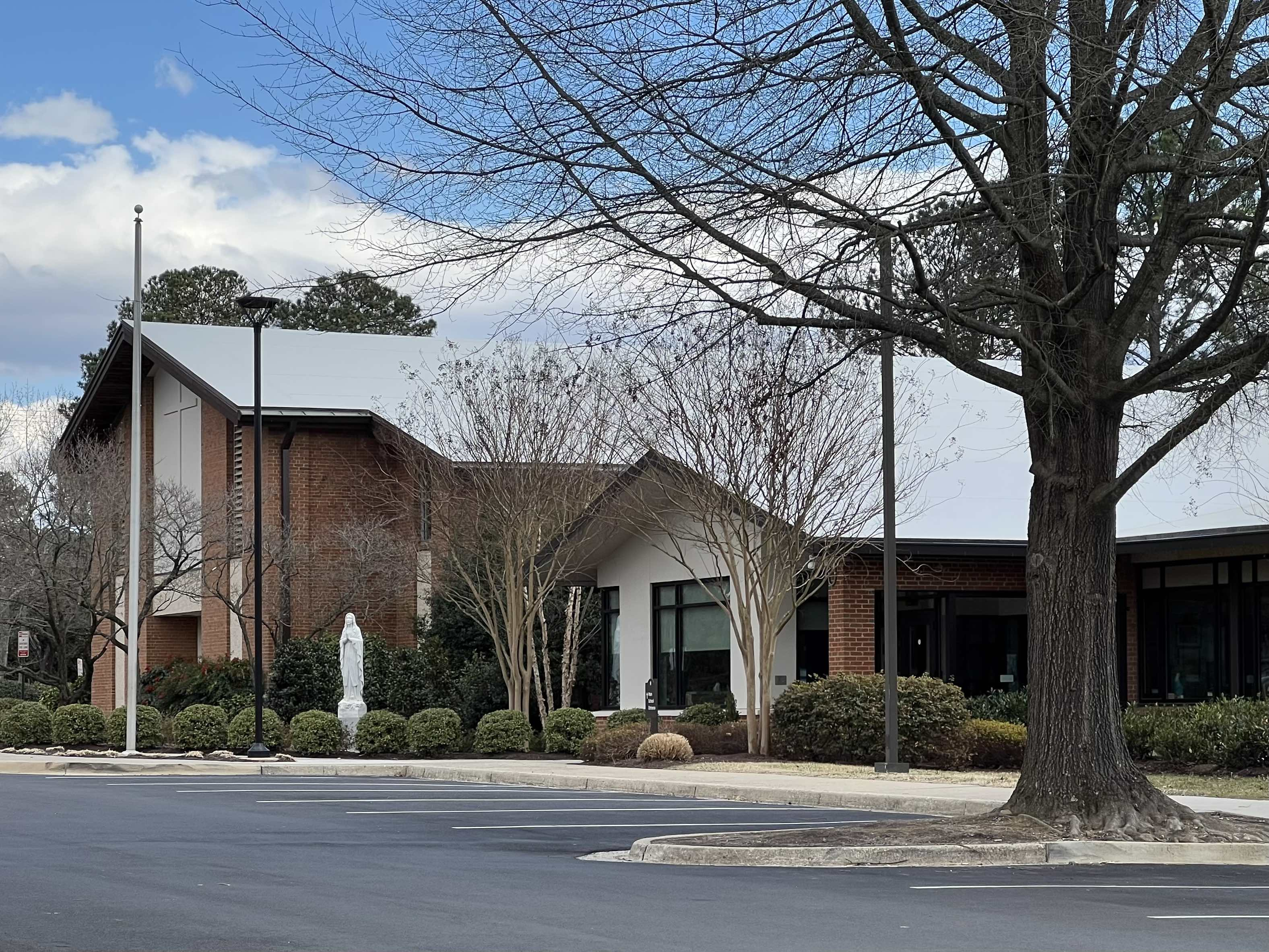

Location
- 9501 Gayton Road; Richmond, Virginia 23229

Information
- School type: Private
- Founded: 1966
- Principal: Mrs. Amanda S. Esparza
- Grades: JK-8 (IB 6-8)
- Enrollment: 425 (2023-2024)
- Language: English
- Colors: Dark Blue, Light Blue and White
- Mascot: Monarch (represented by a lion named Monty)
- Newspaper: Monarch Messenger (Alumni News)
- Yearbook: The Monarch
- Website: www.saintmary.org

St. Mary's Catholic School is a JK-8 educational institution located in Richmond, Virginia, serving 425 students. The Early Childhood Development Center is dedicated to full day instruction of JK, Kindergarten and First Grade. Foreign Language is taught in all grades (JK-Grade 8). Other resource classes include Music, Fine Arts, Health/PE, Technology and Library Sciences. The school is home to the only Catholic IB Middle Years Programme in Central Virginia. Saint Mary's currently offers five high school credit courses. These courses include Algebra I, Geometry, Foreign Language (Spanish I or French I), World History and Earth Science. St. Mary's Parish built a new church which opened in 2007. The church seats 1000 people comfortably. The school has undergone two major facility renovations in 2018 and 2022. A needlepoint bipolar ionization system was installed in all air handling units in both the church and school buildings in 2020.
