= Saddar (Hyderabad) =

Hyderabad neighbourhood

Saddar صددر
- Area
- Coordinates: 25.394°N 68.364°E
- Country: Pakistan
- Province: Sindh
- City: Hyderabad

Government
  - Type: Cantonment Board
  - Nazim: Kanwar Naveed Jamil
  - Naib Nazim: Zafar Ali Rajput
- Time zone: UTC+7 (PST)

Saddar, literally meaning "cardinal", is the central area in the city of Hyderabad, Sindh, Pakistan. Saddar hosts the district and city's main governing bodies. It constitutes the centre of the city geographically and joins the suburbs at each end. The area includes the Cantonment area. Municipal duties fall under the civic agency Cantonment Board.

== History ==
The area known as Hyderabad cantt (or saddar), was built by the British in 1851. It was declared a cantonment in 1874.

== Area ==
The total area of Saddar was measured at 3,015.642 acres (12,020 sqkm). It has the population of 0.1012 million according to census 1998.
