= Diocese of Hyderabad in Pakistan =

Roman Catholic diocese in Pakistan

Coordinates: 25.3932°N 68.3671°E

Diocese of Hyderabad Dioecesis Hyderabadensis اسقف اعظم حیدرآباد
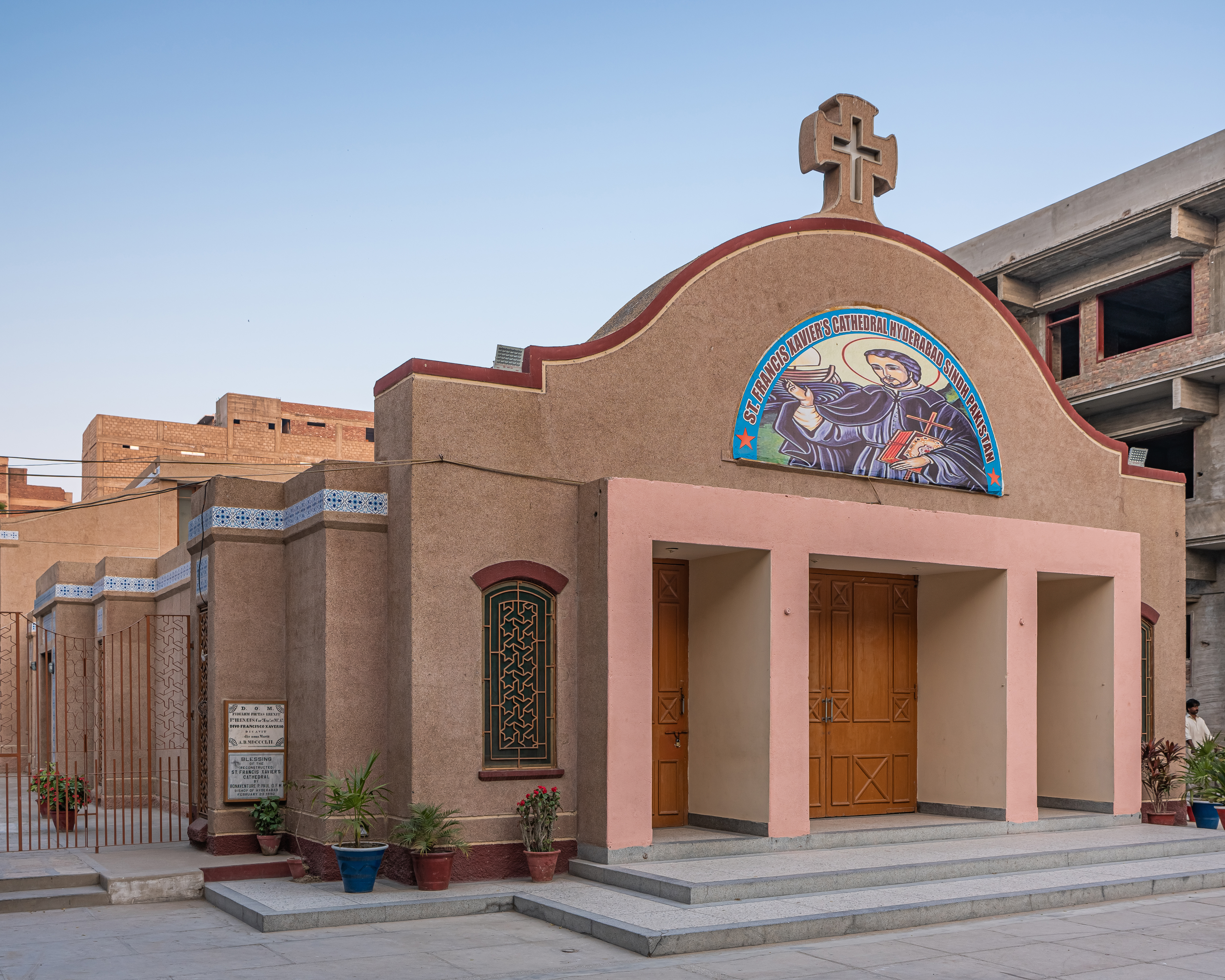
- The Roman Catholic Cathedral of St. Francis Xavier, Hyderabad

Location
- Country: Pakistan
- Ecclesiastical province: Karachi
- Metropolitan: Karachi

Statistics
- Area: 137,386 km^{2} (53,045 sq mi)
- Population: Total; Catholics: (as of 2006); 22,452,472; 48,895 (0.2%)

Information
- Denomination: Catholic Church
- Sui iuris church: Latin Church
- Rite: Roman Rite
- Established: 28 April 1958
- Cathedral: St. Francis Xavier Cathedral

Current leadership
- Pope: Leo XIV
- Bishop: Samson Shukardin OFM
- Metropolitan Archbishop: Benny Mario Travas
- Bishops emeritus: Max John Rodrigues

The Roman Catholic Diocese of Hyderabad (Lat: Dioecesis Hyderabadensis in Pakistan) is a diocese of the Latin Church of the Roman Catholic Church in Pakistan.

== History ==
The Diocese of Hyderabad was created by the Bulla "Eius in Terris", dated 28 April 1958, and officially erected on 23 August 1958, the diocese was split off from the Archdiocese of Karachi.

The diocese comprises parts of the Hyderabad, Larkana and Sukkur Divisions. In the Hyderabad Division: the Districts of Hyderabad, Dadu, Jamshoro, Matiari, Tando Allahyar, Tando Muhammad Khan, Badin, Sanghar, Mirpur Khas, Tharparkar, Thatta, Umerkot and Sujawal. In the Larkana Division: the Districts of Jacobabad, Kashmore, Larkana, Qambar Shahdadkot and Shikarpur. In the Sukkur Division: the Districts of Sukkur, Khairpur, Ghotki, Shaheed Benazir Abad (formerly Nawabshah) and Naushahro Feroze. The main church is St. Francis Xavier Cathedral, Hyderabad.

In 2001, territory was lost along with additional territory in the Archdiocese of Karachi to form the Apostolic Prefecture of Quetta. The diocese is a suffragan of the Archdiocese of Karachi.

On 16 September 1988, Fr. Joseph Coutts of the Roman Catholic Archdiocese of Lahore was ordained as Coadjutor Bishop of Hyderabad.

The Medical Mission Sisters in Hyderabad diocese, based at St. Teresa's Hospital in Mirpur Khas, have been training midwives since 1971 and implement public health programs in poor villages whose people cannot come to the hospital.

In 1993 the Joty Educational and Cultural Centre for education and interreligious dialogue was established, which aims to build good relations with Muslims, marginalise all forms of integralism and violence and promote social harmony. It was initially opened in a small apartment in Hyderabad. In 2005 it has its own building with classrooms, a hall for prayer and meditation and a refectory. The Centre was directed by Fr. Anjou Soares until 2011. The present director of the centre is Fr. Abid Habib, OFM Cap.

Bishop Max John Rodrigues led the Diocese of Hyderabad from his appointment by Pope John Paul II on 3 December 1999, until his resignation was accepted by Pope Francis on Tuesday, 16 December 2014. Pope Francis appointed as Bishop-elect Fr. Samson Shukardin, O.F.M., V.G., a Franciscan who until then had been serving as Vicar General of the Diocese.

The Golden Jubilee of the diocese was celebrated on 23 August 2007; it had 15 priests serving an estimated 50,000 Catholics. The diocese has 45 educational institutes. Father John Murad was the Vicar General of the diocese in 2007. He was replaced by Bishop-elect Shukardin, O.F.M., V.G., who also served as the parish priest of St. Elizabeth Parish in Latifabad, Hyderabad, Sindh.

The Diocese also owns the 75-bed St. Elizabeth’s Hospital, Hyderabad, established in 1958 as a non-profit institution. It provides medical care in Hyderabad and nearby Kotri, and to the tribal people of interior Sindh especially from Mirpurkhas, Tando Allahyar, Tando Adam, Badin, Matli and Nagar Parkar, irrespective of caste or creed.

The Catholic Diocese of Hyderabad has the biggest tribal apostolate in the Country. In 2018 the Diocese welcomed the first nun of the Kacchi Kohli tribe, after 70 years of mission among the tribal peoples in Sindh. Sister Anita Maryam Mansingh, of the Congregation of the Presentation of the Blessed Virgin Mary (PBVM), took her perpetual vows in Hyderabad in May 2018.

The Diocese covers fifteen parishes, eight of which cater for the tribal communities. In 2021 there were 10 diocesan priests in the diocese. The Spiritans (CSSp), Franciscan Friars Minor (OFM), Mill Hill Missionaries (MHM) and Society of St. Columban (SSC) are also serving in the diocese.

== Ordinaries ==
- James Cornelius van Miltenburg, O.F.M. † (28 Apr 1958 Appointed - 10 Mar 1966 Died)
- Bonaventure Patrick Paul, O.F.M. † (13 Apr 1967 Appointed - 1 Sep 1990 Resigned)
- Joseph Coutts (1 Sep 1990 Succeeded - 27 Jun 1998 Appointed, Bishop of Faisalabad)
- Max John Rodrigues (3 Dec 1999 Appointed - 16 Dec 2014 Resigned)
- Samson Shukardin, O.F.M. (Appointed 16 Dec 2014 - )

== Schools ==
The diocese is also active in providing education. The Catholic Board of Education, Hyderabad (CBE HYD) regulates the 17 primary schools, 4 elementary schools and 9 high schools throughout the diocese. The diocese also runs 6 hostels and boarding schools, particularly catering for the education of the tribal children.

== See also ==
- Catholic Church in Pakistan
