= St. Mary's Academy =

St. Mary's Academy may refer to:

== Canada ==
- St. Mary's Academy (Winnipeg), Manitoba
- Saint Mary's Academy (New Brunswick), Edmundston

== Dominica ==
- Saint Mary's Academy, Dominica

== India ==
- St. Mary's Academy, Meerut, Uttar Pradesh

== Philippines ==
- St. Mary's Academy of Caloocan City
- Saint Mary's Academy of Capiz
- St. Mary's Academy of Carmen
- St. Mary's Academy, Guagua, Pampanga
- St. Mary's Academy of Kidapawan
- St. Mary's College of Meycauayan, formerly known as St. Mary's Academy
- St. Mary's Academy of Pasay
- St. Mary's Academy of San Nicolas
- St. Mary's Academy of Santo Niño

== United Kingdom ==
- St Mary's Catholic Academy, Blackpool, Lancashire, England
- St Mary's Academy, Bathgate, West Lothian, Scotland

== United States ==
=== Schools ===
- St. Mary's Academy (Inglewood, California)
- St. Mary's Academy (Colorado)
- Saint Mary's Academy and College, St. Marys, Kansas
- St. Mary's Academy (New Orleans), Louisiana
- St. Mary's Academy (Portland, Oregon)
- St. Mary Academy – Bay View, East Providence, Rhode Island

=== Historic sites ===
- St. Mary's Academy (Davenport, Iowa), listed on the National Register of Historic Places (NRHP)
- St. Mary's – St. Alphonsus Regional Catholic School, Glens Falls, New York, also known and NRHP-listed as St. Mary's Academy
- St. Mary's Academy (Devils Lake, North Dakota), NRHP-listed
- Saint Mary's Academy Building, Pittsburgh, Pennsylvania
- St. Mary's Academy Historic District (Monroe, Michigan), NRHP-listed
- St. Mary's Academy Historic District (Silver City, New Mexico), NRHP-listed in Grant County

== See also ==
- St. Mary's School (disambiguation)
- Saint Mary's College (disambiguation)
- Saint Mary's University (disambiguation)
