= St. Mary's University College =

St. Mary's University College may refer to:

- St. Mary's University College (Addis Ababa), now St Mary's University, Ethiopia
- St Mary's University College, Belfast, Northern Ireland, UK
- St. Mary's University College, Calgary, now St. Mary's University, Canada
- St. Mary's University College, Dublin, now Muckross Park College, Ireland
- St. Mary's University College (Twickenham), now St Mary's University, England, UK

== See also ==
- Saint Mary's University (disambiguation)
- Saint Mary's College (disambiguation)
- University of Mary (disambiguation)
