= Josephine Roberto =

Filipina songwriter, actress and music producer

- Also known as: Banig, Banig Roberto
- Born: Josephine Roberto; December 25, 1977 (age 48); Pasay, Philippines
- Genres: Pop, adult contemporary
- Occupations: Singer; record producer; songwriter; actor
- Years active: 1986–present
- Labels: Double Play Entertainment, VIVA, WEA, Del-Fi
- Website: www.josephineroberto.com

Josephine Roberto (born December 25, 1977), known by her stage name Banig or Banig Roberto, is an international recording artist, songwriter, actress and music producer born in Pasay, Philippines. Although she began singing when she was 3, her professional career started at the age of 8 when she appeared on Ang Bagong Kampeon, a nationally televised talent show in the Philippines. She was a 7-week champion and placed third in the grand finals. After her success on Ang Bagong Kampeon, she appeared on many other television shows and in 1989, won the International Star Search TV competition to become the Junior Category Champion representing the Philippines. This prompted her move to the United States where she has enjoyed a successful international career that continues today.

Star Search led to numerous U.S. television appearances including The Arsenio Hall Show, Into the Night with Rick Dees, The Maury Povich Show, AM Los Angeles, Good Day L.A.. She headlined solo concerts in various musical landmark venues including The Wiltern Theater, Hollywood Palladium, Mark Ettess Arena Trump Taj Mahal, City Center NY, Cow Palace San Francisco, Roxy Theatre Los Angeles, Alex Theatre Glendale CA, Spreckles Theater San Diego, Copley Symphony Hall San Diego and more. At the age of 16, Banig released her first international album in the U.S. entitled Can You Feel My Heart on Del-Fi Records. Singles "Everlasting", "This Time It's For Real" and "I Talk to Everybody" received airplay and charted on radio stations across the U.S. In 2001, Banig and her younger sister Jhoanna Roberto, formed their own record label, Double Play Entertainment. Under this label, Banig released the album Silent Whispers, along with singles "Boogie On the Dance Floor" and "Walk". Both singles received support from radio and club play and peaked at No. 1 on several radio stations across the U.S. Roberto continues to sing, write and produce and is currently working on new music projects while based in the United States.

== Early years ==
Josephine Roberto was born on December 25, 1977, in Pasay, Philippines, and showed an interest in music at a very early age. Her parents, Efren and Gloria Roberto, were both musically inclined and encouraged and supported their daughter's talent. At the age of 3, Josephine was already singing in school functions, town events and family gatherings. Her father recorded rough demos of her singing to be able to show off his talented daughter to co-workers while working abroad. With songs like "Paper Roses", "Mamang Sorbetero", "Fame" and "Anyone Can See", little Josephine impressed her peers, relatives and townsmen and soon had the opportunity to participate in recognized talent shows.

Josephine grew up listening to some of the greatest singers of her time including Michael Jackson, Whitney Houston, Gladys Knight, Aretha Franklin and Tina Turner. These musical idols influenced her vocal style, her stage presence and her ability to perform and entertain.

== Career: 1986–present ==
=== 1986–88 ===
At age 7, her father took her to audition for Ang Bagong Kampeon, a nationally televised talent show in the Philippines. She won 2nd place, but was determined to audition again. The next year, at the age of 8, she won 7 consecutive weeks and made it to the grand finals. She was the youngest contestant remaining in the competition, and had a signature growl that caught the attention of the show's viewers. Having just lost her baby teeth, she was often teased by the show's host, the late Bert "Tawa" Marcelo, with jokes about the young contestant still wetting her "Banig" ("mattress" in Tagalog). With a powerful voice, she sang songs well beyond her years, imitating Shirley Bassey with "Big Spender", "Never Never Never", "The Greatest Performance of My Life" and "This is My Life". She also performed Whitney Houston's hits "The Greatest Love of All" and "Saving All My Love For You" along with broadway classics "Cabaret" and "New York New York" in the style of Liza Minnelli. The little girl with the big voice captured the attention of households across the Philippines with the stage name Banig. She came 3rd in the grand finals of Ang Bagong Kampeon singing "The Greatest Love of All".

Banig released her very first single from WEA entitled "Makinang Kumakanta". In 1987, she won Best Child Performer at the Aliw Awards (Philippine's version of Tony Awards). In 1988, she won Best Child Performer at the Awit Awards.

At age 11, she released her first album in the Philippines entitled "BANIG" from VIVA Records where she introduced her first composition, Musika. In 1989 she made her film debut in Viva Films' feature entitled "M & M the Incredible Twins" for which she received a Star Awards nomination for Best Child Actress in 1990.

She continued performing in the Philippines including as the opening act for Duran Duran at the Araneta Coliseum, Quezon City, and headlined concerts including Banig Live at SM Cubao, Quezon City, Banig Live at Circus Circus SM City, N. EDSA, Quezon City, An Evening with BANIG at St. Mary's College, Meycauayan, Bulacan, That Old Black Magic, Music Museum in Greenhills, Metro Manila, and Banig Live in Concert at St. Mary's College, Meycauayan, Bulacan.

=== 1989–93 ===
Following her International Star Search victory, Roberto moved to the United States and signed a management contract with Motown Entertainment headed by Suzanne De Passe and Irene Dreayer (producer of hit T.V sitcom Sister, Sister and The Suite Life of Zack & Cody) to manage her U.S. career. She was also signed with Twentieth Century Fox to develop a television series. During this time, she made an appearance on The Arsenio Hall Show (in 1989) to promote her first solo concert at the Wiltern Theater. She sang "Get Up Get Down Get Funky Get Loose" by Teddy Pendegrass, which got a standing ovation from the audience. Arsenio Hall commented that "I can't believe that kind of voice comes out of that body." Banig was asked to perform on the show again in November 1989 and sang "Dancing in the Streets."

=== 1993–95 ===
In 1993, Roberto signed with an independent record label, Del-Fi Records, headed by Bob Keane – the same label that launched the career of Ritchie Valens ("La Bamba"). Del-Fi released her first U.S. album, Can You Feel My Heart, in February 1994. Can You Feel My Heart peaked at No. 8 on the Top 100 chart in Virgin Mega Store Los Angeles. Her singles "This Time It's For Real", "Everlasting" and "I Talk to Everybody" received airplay on several radio stations throughout the United States.

In 1994, she was chosen by Project Reward to headline a series of concerts in middle and junior high schools in San Jose and Los Angeles sponsored by the Educational Support Marketing Network to provide schools with positive reinforcement program and reward students for improved learning achievement. Students jammed in line waiting for autographs. When programs and flyers ran out, she signed T-shirts, textbooks, arms, legs and hands of students of all different nationalities.

=== 1996–2000 ===
In 1999, Roberto signed with a record label called Magnetic Entertainment, headed by Kool & the Gang's Amir Bayyan. She made several recordings that were never released. During this association, Bayyan introduced Banig to Joe Jackson (father of Michael and Janet Jackson). Mr. Jackson became an important supporter of Banig's career. She and sister, Jhoanna Roberto also wrote and produced songs for Joe Jackson's artist, Crystal.

=== 2001–06 ===
In 2001, she released her second U.S. CD, Silent Whispers, through her own label "Double Play Entertainment". It was distributed by Aloha Music International and was featured in Tower Records listening Stations across the U.S. The CD includes 17 tracks of soulful pop love songs with a mix of club-hitting upbeat anthems that showcase Banig's vocal range. All songs were written and produced by Josephine Roberto & Jhoanna Roberto.

The first single off the album was a crossover pop/R&B dance anthem, "Boogie on the Dance Floor" which was released as a maxi-single. It featured different remixes including an urban Atlanta flavor mix ("Ruff Party Remix") with a tongue twisting rap sequence by rapper/producer Jojo (Jhoanna Roberto). It also includes the "Red Velvet Mix", a bass driven track with overlapping dubs and intense breaks and the progressive house/trance twist of DJ Astra's "Floor x 4 Club Mix".

The second single, "Walk", was released as a maxi-single in 2006. It features urban/dancehall, house, freestyle and dub remixes. "Free-Mix" delivers an urban flavor mixing 808 sounds with rapper Jojo (Jhoanna Roberto). "Double Play Remix" features New Jersey rapper, Struggle E Stylez. The "Tribal Theory Mix" is a Drum & Bass underground track. DJ Astra's "Dub Mix" delivers a trance mix intended for the dance floors.

=== 2010–12 ===
In 2010, she released her self-titled CD in her native language, Tagalog, with the intention of reaching out to her fans back home in the Philippines. She wrote, produced and sang on the album. Double Play Entertainment tested the waters in the United States by releasing a Tagalog dance song in the U.S. Radio market.

=== 2012–present ===
As of 2012, she is performing live once again and releasing material through her label, Double Play Entertainment, using her birth name, Josephine Roberto as well. She is currently working on new projects in the United States using the name Josephine 'Banig' Roberto. She continues to record, write and produce under Double Play Entertainment. Josephine 'Banig' Roberto also owns a marketing company that works with international artists to market their music in the U.S. On July 15, 2014 Banig released her single 'He wants to get it' on iTunes U.S. and the music video premiered on Vevo July 19.

== Family and personal life ==
Josephine Roberto is the eldest daughter of Efren and Gloria Roberto. She spent the first 9 years of her childhood in Hagonoy, Bulacan, Pasay and Meycauayan, Bulacan, before moving to Los Angeles, California. Her younger sister Jhoanna Roberto has worked as her manager, business partner, producer, songwriter, and choreographer. Jhoanna is a co-producer and co-songwriter on all of her original compositions. She attended St Mary's College of Meycauayan Bulacan for elementary school in the Philippines. After moving to the U.S., she attended the 32nd St. USC Magnet School of Performing Arts from fifth to ninth grade. She graduated as salutatorian in her class. She also attended Van Nuys High School, Performing Arts Magnet School.

== Voice and influences ==
Since her debut at a young age, Roberto has always been known as the little girl with the big voice. Her most obvious influences include Whitney Houston, Michael Jackson, Tina Turner, Aretha Franklin, Gladys Knight, Janet Jackson and Mariah Carey. As described by Radio and T.V. personality Rick Dees, "She's got a vocal range of Whitney Houston and Patti Labelle combined. Watch out, Whitney, careful Janet Jackson, we got a 13-year-old singing sensation." Maury Povich said, "What a voice! You're just so great. We want you to come back as the next Whitney Houston, the next Mariah Carey and better than that, the next Banig Roberto."

For over 20 years, people who have followed her career, have often praised her powerful vocal range, versatility, energetic moves on stage and her natural ability to thrill audiences with her performance. She has been described as a natural vocalist and talented entertainer. Korean TV Host Johnny Yune said, "I got chills when I listen to you. You're not just a singer. You have 100% feeling."

== Concerts and reviews ==
At the age of 10, Roberto was the youngest Filipino artist to headline her own concerts. Her first concert series as a headliner was at the Circus Circus, followed by a concert series at the Music Museum in Manila. After moving to the U.S., her first headlining show was at the Wiltern Theater in Los Angeles. Tito Claudio of Balita Today, said in his review of the performance (June 6, 1989), "It was a frenzied standing ovation. The crowd wanted more. There was the welcome presence of non-Filipino American guests, who moaned, rolled, clapped, even whistled and actually initiated the final standing ovation." In 1990, Roberto headlined at Hollywood's musical landmark, Roxy Theater, in a concert titled "Jam Dancin". Other concerts followed at the Scottish Rite Auditorium, San Diego Convention Center – was just 13 when she sang her own rendition of Bryan Adams' "Everything I Do, I Do It For You" at her San Diego Convention Center concert. Copley Symphony Hall, Cow Palace in San Francisco, Wilshire Ebell Theater Los Angeles, City Center New York, Hollywood Palladium, Trump Taj Mahal in Atlantic City and many more.

In June 1990, Roberto performed a show at the Quirino Grandstand entitled "Iba and Pinoy". It was a free concert attended by 500,000 people in celebration of the Philippine Independence Day. In his review, Boy Abunda, Jr. (People's Tonight, June 13, 1990) said, "She was met by deafening applause. Banig ranted. She kicked, strutted, ran, wiggled, giggled, sang and conquered the multitude with her first song. Not even the rain could upstage Banig, who unknown to her mesmerized audience, was running a 39-degree fever. Banig had to be dragged backstage. People demanded. 'We want BANIG! We want BANIG!' More rains poured." During her visit back in Manila in 1990, she was also invited by Philippine President Corazon Aquino to the Malacanang Palace for a courtesy call. She endorsed Mighty Kid Shoes, a children's shoe line in the Philippines and was chosen as the endorser for Pop Cola Philippines, with the tagline of "Bilib Sila Sa Pinoy" in celebration of Banig's international recognition representing the Philippines.

=== Concerts ===
- Banig Live (Headline) SM Cubao, Quezon City, Philippines May 1988
- Banig Live (Headline) Circus Circus, Quezon City, Philippines June 1988
- Banig Live (Headline) N. Edsa, Quezon City, Philippines June 1988
- Pure Energy (Guest) Shrine Auditorium, Los Angeles, CA, USA December 1988
- Duran Duran Concert (Opening Act) Araneta Coliseum, Quezon City, Philippines February 1989
- That Old Black Magic (Headline) Music Museum, Greenhills, San Juan City, Metro Manila, Philippines February 1989
- An Evening With Banig (Headline) St. Mary's College, Meycauayan, Bulacan, Philippines February 1989
- Banig Live (Headline) Wiltern Theatre, Los Angeles, CA, USA June 1989
- Banig Live (Headline) St. Mary's College, Meycauayan, Bulacan, Philippines July 1989
- Jam Dancin' (Headline) The Roxy Theatre, West Hollywood, CA, USA February 1990
- Iba Ang Pinoy (Headline) Quirino Grandstand, Manila, Philippines June 1990
- Nite of Pop, Rock & Soul (Headline) Scottish Rite Auditorium, Los Angeles, CA, USA January 1991
- Banig Magic (Headline) San Diego Convention Center, San Diego, CA, USA November 1991
- Christopher de Leon Concert (Guest) Riverside Auditorium, Riverside, CA, USA July 1993
- Banig Is Back (Headline) Copley Symphony Hall, San Diego, CA, USA August 1993
- Banig Live (Headline) Mayan Theater, Los Angeles, CA, USA February 1994
- KMXZ Car Show (Guest) Sta. Cruz County Fair, CA, USA April. 1994
- Fiesta Island 1994 (Headline) Cow Palace, Daly Cty, CA, USA June 1994
- Banig Live (Headline) Wilshire Ebell Theatre, Los Angeles, CA USA July 1994
- B-96 Presents (Guest) Ka-Boom, Chicago, IL, USA August 1994
- Tournament of Champions (Guest) Comiskey Park, Chicago, IL, USA August 1994
- Philippine Weekend Festivals (Headline) Delano, CA, USA August 1994
- Hawaii In-Line Skate Fest (Guest) Aloha Stadium, Honolulu, HI, USA September 1994
- QSP Fall Tour 1994 (Headline) Jr./Middle School, Northern/Southern CA, USA November/December 1994
- Can You Feel My Heart (Headline) Copley Symphony Hall, San Diego, CA, USA July 1995
- US-Philippines Expo'95 (Headline) Fairplex, Pomona, CA, USA/Meadowlands, NJ, USA August 1995
- Banig in Concert (Headline) Trump Taj Mahal, Atlantic, City, NJ, USA November 1995
- Live in New York City (Headline) City Center, New York, NY, USA August 1996
- US-Philippines Expo'96 (Headline) Queen Mary, Long Beach, CA, USA November 1996
- Banig Live (Headline) Hollywood Palladium, Hollywood, CA, USA November 1996
- Banig The Experience (Headline) Carson Civic Auditorium, Carson, CA, USA November 1997
- Banig Coming of Age 2001 (Headline) Alex Theatre, Glendale, CA, USA May 2001
- Philippine-American Expo (Headline) Los Angeles Convention Center, Los Angeles, CA, USA June 2001
- Philippine-American Expo (Headline) Del Mar, CA, USA November 2002
- Silent Whispers (Headline) Spreckels Theatre, San Diego, CA May 2003
- Philippine-American Expo (Headline) Del Mar, CA, USA November 2003
- Josephine 'Banig' Roberto "Unplugged concert series" (Headliner) Los Angeles, CA USA July 2014

== TV appearances in the Philippines ==
=== 1986 ===
- August – December – Ang Bagong Kampeon (The New Champion) – RPN Ch. 9 (She was the 7-week champion of the show and the show Host gave her the moniker "Banig").
- December 16 – Guest Performer, Gary V Christmas Special – RPN Ch. 9.

=== 1987 ===
- January 7 – Kalatog-Pinggan – ABS-CBN Ch. 2
- February 9 – That's Entertainment – GMA Ch. 7
- March 23 – Big Sunday – ABS-CBN Ch. 2
- April 5 – Always, Snooky – ABS-CBN Ch. 2
- June 15 – Eat Bulaga – RPN Ch. 9
- September 11 – Lunch Date – GMA Ch. 7

=== 1988 ===
- February 7 – Tin Pan Alley – ABS-CBN Ch. 2
- February 13 – Kopong-Kopong – IBC Ch. 13
- March 13 – The Sharon Cuneta Show – ABS-CBN Ch. 2
- March 19 – Lunch Date – GMA Ch. 7
- April 23 – Uncle Bob Show – GMA Ch. 7
- April 25 – Good Morning – PTV Ch. 4
- April 27 – Kalatog-Pinggan – ABS-CBN Ch. 2
- May 4 – Loveliness – IBC Ch. 13
- May 8 – Kuwarta O Kahon – RPN Ch. 9
- May 13 – Lunch Date – GMA Ch. 7
- May 26 – Vilma – GMA Ch. 7
- June 5 – The Sharon Cuneta Show – ABS-CBN Ch. 2
- June 6 – That's Entertainment – GMA 7
- October 1 – Lotlot & Friends – RPN Ch. 9
- October 9 – Superstar – RPN Ch. 9
- December 25 – Kuwarta O Kahon – RPN Ch. 9
- December 26 – Not So Late Night with Edu – ABS-CBN Ch. 2
- December 31 – Lunch Date – GMA Ch. 7

=== 1989 ===
- January 28 – Eat Bulaga – ABS-CBN Ch. 2
- January 29 – Kuarta O Kahon – RPN Ch. 9
- February 23 – Eat Bulaga – ABS-CBN Ch. 2
- February 25 – Lunch Date – GMA Ch. 7
- February 26 – GMA Super Show – GMA Ch. 7
- March 10 – Ang Bagong Kampeon – RPN Ch. 9
- April 26 – Tonight with Dick and Carmi – ABS-CBN Ch. 2
- April 28 – Lunch Date – GMA Ch. 7
- April 28 – Star Watch – PTV Ch. 4
- April 29 – Movie Magazine – GMA Ch. 7
- April 29 – Regal Family – IBC Ch. 13
- May 1 – Eat Bulaga – ABS-CBN Ch. 2
- May 1 – That's Entertainment – GMA Ch. 7
- May 2 – Eye to Eye – GMA Ch. 7
- May 2 – Eat Bulaga – ABS-CBN Ch. 2
- June 29 – MAD – GMA Ch. 7
- July 9 – Batang Pinoy – IBC Ch. 13
- July 9 – The Sharon Cuneta Show – ABS-CBN Ch. 2

=== 1990 ===
- May 25 – Eye to Eye – GMA Ch. 7
- May 25 – TV Patrol – ABS-CBN Ch. 2
- May 25 – Movie Magazine – GMA Ch. 7
- May 26 – Eye to Eye – GMA Ch. 7
- May 28 – Ryan Ryan Musikahan – ABS-CBN Ch. 2
- May 29 – MAD – GMA Ch. 7
- June 2 – Eat Bulaga – ABS-CBN Ch. 2
- June 2 – Uncle Bob Show – GMA Ch. 7
- June 3 – Sa Linggo nAPO Sila – ABS-CBN Ch. 2
- June 3 – The Sharon Cuneta Show – ABS-CBN Ch. 2
- June 4 – Mongolian Barbecue – IBC Ch. 13
- June 9 – Magandang Gabi – PTV Ch. 4 (Interview with Phil. Pres. Corazon Aquino)
- June 9 – Lunch Date – GMA Ch. 7
- June 10 – GMA Supershow – GMA Ch. 7
- July 6 – Vilma – GMA Ch. 7
- July 7 – TV Patrol – ABS-CBN Ch. 2

== TV appearances in the U.S. and Canada ==
=== 1988 ===
- November 18 – International Star Search Grand Champion-Junior Category KCBS, Ch. 2

=== 1989 ===
- June 1 – The Arsenio Hall Show KCOP, Ch. 13
- August 30 – The Super Dave Osborne Show Toronto, Canada, Showtime Cable TV (Aired December 1989, January 1990)
- November 30 – The Arsenio Hall Show KCOP, Ch. 13

=== 1990 ===
- August 14 – Kid N' Play Cartoon Show KNBC, Ch. 4 (Aired in September 1990)
- September 23 – Variety Children's Charities Telethon KCAL, Ch. 9

=== 1991 ===
- January 9 – AM Los Angeles with Steve Edwards, Tawny Little KABC, Ch. 7
- March 4 – Into the Night with Rick Dees KABC, Ch. 7
- June 27 – Into the Night with Rick Dees KABC, Ch. 7
- October 8 – Studio 59 with Chris Lemmon KABC, Ch. 7

=== 1992 ===
- April 14 – National Anthem Rendition NBA Games – Clippers vs. Kings Los Angeles Sports Arena Sports Channel, Cable TV
- April 21 – The Maury Povich Show KCBS, Ch. 2
- December 23 – National Anthem Rendition NCAA Games – USC vs. Nebraska Los Angeles Sports Arena PRTK Sports Ch.

=== 1993 ===
- February 27 – Leon & Friends KTBN, Cable TV (Aired May 1993)

=== 1994 ===
- June 23 – The Joan Quinn Profiles BHTV
- July 14 – E! News Daily – Bianca Ferrari/Steve Kmetko E! Channel, Cable TV (Aired August 1994)
- August 9 – Good Day LA – Barbara Schroeder FOX, Ch. 11
- September 10 – The Johnny Yune Show KSCI, International Ch. (Aired September 25, 1994)

=== 2018 ===
- March 15 - ASAP Natin To Sa Bay Area (ABS-CBN TFC)

=== Television specials ===
- August 10, 1990 – Banig Special – PTV Ch. 4 (A special on Banig's life in the U.S.)

== Guest performances and live shows in the Philippines ==
=== 1986 ===
- December 28 – Metro Manila Film Festival Awards Night Ultra (now PhilSports Arena), Pasig City

=== 1987 ===
- February 14 – Gary V Love Power Concert Quirino Grandstand, Rizal Park, Manila
- July 16–17 – Gary V Campus Tour Ateneo and De La Salle University, Manila
- September 6 – Lou Bonnevie Young at Heart Concert Rizal Theater, Makati Cty
- September 9–11 Aliw Awards Night (Performance Awards) Rizal Theater, Makati City
- September 30 – Uniwide Presents Uniwide Store, Manila

=== 1988 ===
- January 31 – Gary V Live in Concert Pamantasan ng Lungsod ng Maynila, Manila
- April 10 – The Center for Pop Music Philippines SM City, N. EDSA, Quezon City
- June 1 – Diet Coke Presents, Makati City
- June 18 – Gary V Live in Concert Dagupan City, Pangasinan
- Aug 5–6- Gary V Sound of Life Concert Rizal Theater, Makati City
- September 9 – Gary V Pure Energy Concert San Agustin Gym, Iloilo City, Iloilo
- September 17 – Gary V High Energy Concert Central Bank Convention, Davao City
- September 23 – Gary V Concert PBMIT Gym, Batangas City, Batangas
- October 13 – RFM Variety Show RFM Complex, Mandaluyong
- October 28 – Kuh Ledesma After the Rain Concert Cebu Plaza Hotel, Cebu City, Cebu
- November 2 – GMA Tower Launching Broadway Centrum, New Manila, Quezon City
- December 15 – Nestle Phil. Variety Show Inter-Continental Hotel, Makati City
- December 27 – Metro Manila Film Festival Awards Night, Philippine International Convention Center, Pasay City

=== 1989 ===
- February 27 – March 1 – Opening Act for Duran Duran Concert Smart Araneta Coliseum, Quezon City
- February 25 – Anniversary of EDSA Revolution EDSA, Quezon City
- April 16 – Rocking High Concert Music Museum, Greenhills, San Juan City
- May 5–7 – Gary V Concert Naga City and Sorsogon

=== 1990 ===
- May 26 – Film Academy of the Phil. Awards Night, Philippine International Convention Center, Pasay City

== Recordings ==
- Makinang Kumakanta (Single) – WEA (now Universal Records), Philippines 1988
- Jambalaya (Single) – WEA (now Universal Records), Philippines 1988
- BANIG (Album) – VIVA Records, Philippines 1990
- Billy (Single) – VIVA Records, Philippines 1990
- Pandangguhan (Single) – VIVA Records, Philippines 1990
- Can You Feel My Heart (EP) – Del-Fi Records, USA 1994
- I Talk To Everybody (Single) – Del-Fi Records, USA 1994
- Everlasting (Single) – Del-Fi Records, USA 1994
- This Time It' For Real (Single) – Del-Fi Records, USA 1994
- The Wonders Of Your Love (Single) – Del-Fi Records, USA 1994
- Can You Feel My Heart (Single) – Del-Fi Records, USA 1994
- Silent Whispers (Album) – Double Play Entertainment, USA 2002
- Boogie on the Dance Floor (Single) – Double Play Entertainment, USA 2004
- Walk (Single) – Double Play Entertainment, USA 2006
- Josephine Roberto (Album) – Double Play Entertainment, USA 2010
- He wants to get it (Single) – Double Play Entertainment, USA 2014

== Movies and commercials ==
- "M & M" The Incredible Twins – VIVA Films 1989
- POP COLA – Cosmos Bottling Co 1990
- Mighty Kid Shoes – Rubber World Philippines 1990

== Awards, nominations, and recognition ==
- Best Child Performer – Aliw Awards 1987
- Best Child Recording Artist – Awit Awards 1988
- Nominee, Best Child Actress – Star Awards 1990
- Nominee, Best Child New Actress – Star Awards 1990
- Nominee, Newsmaker of the Year – Star Awards 1990
- Award Winning Singer – Youth in Film Showcase 1990
- Role Model Award – Search To Involve Pilipino Americans 1994
- Great Achievements in Performing Arts – US – Philippines Expo Recognition Award 1995
- Outstanding/Invaluable Service to the Community – Special Congressional Recognition 1995
- Laguna Awards 1996
- Manila-US Times Eagle Awards
- Celebrity Awards
- Tri-Media Artist in Excellence Awards – 13th Philippine – American Exposition 2001 – June 16–17, 2001
- Tri-Media Artist in Excellence Awards – 16th Philippine – American Exposition 2002 – November 16–17, 2002
- Tri-Media Artist in Excellence Awards – 18th Philippine – American Exposition 2003 – November 22–23, 2003
