= Saint Mary's College =

Saint Mary's College (in French, Collège Sainte-Marie), is the name of several colleges and schools:

== Australia ==
- St Mary's College, Ipswich, an all-girls Catholic school in Queensland
- St Mary's College, Maryborough, a co-educational school in Queensland
- St Mary's College, Toowoomba, an all-boys Christian Brothers school in Toowoomba, Queensland
- St Mary's College, Adelaide, an all-girls Catholic school in South Australia
- St Mary's College, Hobart, an all-girls Catholic school in Tasmania
- St Mary's College (Seymour), a school in Victoria
- St Mary's College, Melbourne (residential college), a residential college affiliated with the University of Melbourne in Victoria
- St Mary's College, Melbourne (school), a co-educational school in Victoria

== Canada ==
- St. Mary's University College, Calgary, Alberta
- St. Mary's College, Sault Ste. Marie, Ontario
- The former St. Mary's College, Brockville, Ontario
- The former Collège Sainte-Marie de Montréal, Quebec

== India ==
- St. Mary's College, Manarcaud, Kerala
- St. Mary's College, Thrissur, Kerala
- St. Mary's College, Hyderabad, Telangana

== Ireland ==
- St Mary's College, Dublin
- St Mary's College, Galway
- St Mary's College, Dundalk

== Jamaica ==
- St. Mary's College, Jamaica, a co-educational school in Saint Catherine Parish, Jamaica

== Japan ==
- St. Mary's College (Japan)

== Mauritius ==
- Saint Mary's College, Mauritius, Rose-Hill
- College Sainte-Marie (Mauritius), Quatre Bornes

== New Zealand ==
- St Mary's College, Auckland, an all-girls Catholic school in Ponsonby
- St Mary's College, Wellington, an all-girls Catholic school
- St Mary's College, Christchurch, an all-girls Catholic school, now Marian College

== Pakistan ==
- St Mary's College, Rawalpindi

== Philippines ==
- St. Mary's College of Baliuag
- St. Mary's College of Meycauayan
- Saint Mary's College of Borongan
- Saint Mary's College of Quezon City

== Saint Lucia ==
- Saint Mary's College (Saint Lucia), an all-boys Catholic Secondary School

== Samoa ==
- Kolisi o Sagata Maria, also called St Mary's College, a girls' high school in Apia

== Sri Lanka ==
- St. Mary's College, Negombo, a Catholic Boys School in Gampaha District
- St. Mary's College, Chilaw, Catholic Secondary School in Puttalam District
- St. Mary's College, Kegalle, an all-boys Catholic Secondary School
- St. Mary's College, Trincomalee, school in Trincomalee

== Thailand ==
- Saint Mary's College Nakhon Ratchasima, Catholic School

== Trinidad and Tobago ==
- Saint Mary's College, Trinidad and Tobago, a Catholic Secondary School in Port of Spain, Trinidad

== United Kingdom ==
=== Secondary Education ===
- St. Mary's College, Blackburn, a Roman Catholic sixth form college in Lancashire, England
- St Mary's College, Clady, a Roman Catholic secondary school in Clady, County Londonderry, Northern Ireland
- St Mary's College, Crosby, a co-educational, formerly Irish Christian Brothers, school in Great Crosby, England
- St Mary's College, Derry, Northern Ireland
- St Mary's College, Hull, a Roman Catholic secondary school in Hull, Yorkshire, England
- St Mary's College, Middlesbrough, a Roman Catholic sixth form college in Middlesbrough, England which closed in 2011
- St Mary's College, Wallasey, a Catholic comprehensive in the Wirral, England
- St Mary's College, Southampton, now St Mary's Independent School, a Roman Catholic school in Southampton, England

=== Higher Education ===
- St Mary's University College, Belfast, a college of Queen's University Belfast, in Northern Ireland
- St Mary's College, Durham, a college of Durham University
- St Mary's College, St Andrews, a college of the University of St Andrews, Scotland
- St Mary's University College, Twickenham, England, now St Mary's University
- St Mary's College, Oxford, a former college of Oxford University
- St Mary's College of Education, a former teacher training college in Newcastle upon Tyne

Seminaries

- St Mary's College, Oscott, England

== United States ==
by state

- Saint Mary's College of California
- St. Mary's College (Delaware), Wilmington, Delaware
- Saint Mary-of-the-Woods College, Saint Mary-of-the-Woods, Indiana
- Saint Mary's College (Indiana), Notre Dame, Indiana
- Saint Mary's Academy and College, St. Marys, Kansas
- University of Saint Mary, formerly Saint Mary College, Leavenworth, Kansas
- St. Mary's College (Kentucky), Lebanon, Kentucky
- St. Mary's College, in Baltimore, now known as St. Mary's Seminary and University
- St. Mary's College of Maryland, St. Mary's City, Maryland
- St. Mary's College (Ilchester), Ilchester, Maryland
- Saint Mary's College (Michigan), Orchard Lake, Michigan—now a college of Madonna University
- St. Mary's College (Minnesota), now Saint Mary's University of Minnesota
- College of Saint Mary, Omaha, Nebraska, an all-woman's college
- St. Mary's College (North Carolina), now Saint Mary's School, Raleigh, North Carolina
- St. Mary's College, later Marylhurst University, Marylhurst, Oregon (defunct)
- St. Mary's College, now part of Wyalusing Academy, Prairie du Chien, Wisconsin
- St. Mary's College, now the University of Dayton

== See also ==
- St Mary's College RFC, Dublin
- St. Mary's School (disambiguation)
- Saint Mary's University (disambiguation)
- St. Mary's Academy (disambiguation)
- Mount St. Mary's (disambiguation)
- University of Mary (disambiguation)
