= Saint Mary's University =

St. Mary's University (in French, Université Ste-Marie, in Spanish, Universidad de Santa María) is the name of several universities:

== Brazil ==
- Universidade Federal de Santa Maria

== Canada ==
- St. Mary's University (Calgary), Alberta
- Saint Mary's University (Halifax), Nova Scotia
- Collège Sainte-Marie de Montréal, Montreal, Quebec, defunct

== Chile ==
- Universidad Técnica Federico Santa María

== Ethiopia ==
- St. Mary's University (Addis Ababa)

== Panama ==
- Universidad Católica Santa María La Antigua

== Peru ==
- Catholic University of Santa María

== Philippines ==
- Saint Mary's University (Philippines), Bayombong, Nueva Vizcaya

== South Sudan ==
- St. Mary's University in Juba

== United Kingdom ==
- St Mary's University College, Belfast, a college of Queen's University Belfast, in Northern Ireland
- St Mary's University, Twickenham, London, oldest Catholic university in the United Kingdom

== United States ==
- Saint Mary's College of California, Moraga, California
- St. Mary's College of Maryland, St. Mary's City, Maryland
- St. Mary's Seminary and University, Baltimore, Maryland
- Mount St. Mary's University (Maryland), Emmitsburg, Maryland
- Saint Mary's College (Michigan), Orchard Lake, Michigan, defunct—now known as Madonna University
- Saint Mary's University of Minnesota, Winona, Minnesota
- St. Mary's University (Galveston, Texas), Galveston, Texas, a defunct university that closed in 1922.
- St. Mary's University, Texas, San Antonio, Texas
- University of Saint Mary, Leavenworth, Kansas

== Venezuela ==
- Universidad Santa María (Venezuela)

== See also ==
- St. Mary's University College (disambiguation)
- Saint Mary's (disambiguation)
- Saint Mary's College (disambiguation)
- St. Mary's High School (disambiguation)
- St. Mary's School (disambiguation)
- St. Mary's Academy (disambiguation)
- University of Mary (disambiguation)
