= Rose-Irène d'Entremont =

Member of the Order of Canada (born 1943)

- Born: April 19, 1943 (age 83); West Pubnico, Nova Scotia, Canada
- Occupation: Entrepreneur
- Known for: Community and economic development in Nova Scotia
- Awards: Order of Canada; Order of Nova Scotia

Rose-Irène d'Entremont born April 19, 1943 (age 83) is a bilingual Acadian entrepreneur from Nova Scotia, Canada. She has worked for over 40 years focusing on tourism, culture and economic development. She is a member of the Order of Canada and the Order of Nova Scotia. They are also inducted into the Nova Scotia Business Hall of Fame. Rose-Irène completed her primary and elementary studies in West Pubnico and her secondary studies at the École métropolitaine de Ste-Anne-du-Ruisseau. She received an honorary doctorate in commerce from Saint Mary's University in Halifax, Nova Scotia.

== Awards and distinctions ==
She is the recipient of several awards and distinctions.

- 1993 - Governor General of Canada Commemorative Medal
- 1994 - Inducted into the Nova Scotia Business Hall of Fame.
- 2001 - Member of the Order of Canada
- 2002 - Queen Elizabeth II Golden Jubilee Medal
- 2012 - Queen Elizabeth II Diamond Jubilee Medal
- 2017 - Member of the Order of Nova Scotia
- 2022 - Queen Elizabeth II Platinum Jubilee Medal
