= University of Mary (disambiguation) =

University of Mary or University of Saint Mary can refer to several universities:

== United States ==
- University of Mary in North Dakota
- University of Mary Washington in Virginia
- University of Mary Hardin–Baylor in Texas
- University of Saint Mary in Kansas
- University of Saint Mary of the Lake in Illinois

== Peru ==
- Catholic University of Santa María

== See also ==
- Saint Mary's University (disambiguation)
- St. Mary's University College (disambiguation)
- Saint Mary's College (disambiguation)
