= Ang Bagong Kampeon =

Philippine amateur singing contest

- Genre: Talent show
- Created by: Wilma Galvante
- Presented by: Bert Marcelo; Pilita Corrales
- Country of origin: Philippines
- Original languages: Filipino; English

Production
- Production locations: Live Studio 2, RPN Studio, Broadcast City, Quezon City
- Camera setup: Multiple-camera setup
- Running time: 2 hours

Original release
- Network: Radio Philippines Network
- Release: 1981 – October 1988

Related
- Tanghalan ng Kampeon (GMA Network, 1988–1993; 2024 on TiktoClock); Tawag ng Tanghalan (ABS-CBN, 1954–1972; 1987–1988; 2016–present on It's Showtime)

Ang Bagong Kampeon (transl. The New Champion) is a Philippine television reality competition show broadcast by RPN. Hosted by Bert Marcelo and Pilita Corrales, It aired from 1981 to October 1988.

== Overview ==
Ang Bagong Kampeon was created by Wilma Galvante.

The competition has launched the careers of several successful singers, notably, Regine Velasquez and Donna Cruz.

The show also had a contestant named Josephine "Banig" Roberto, who later defeated Christina Aguilera on the way to become Female Vocalist Champion in the 1989 edition of Star Search in the United States.

Following its conclusion in 1988, the show is later renamed to Tanghalan ng Kampeon after Galvante shifted to GMA Network. Marcelo and Corrales returned as the hosts. However, RPN brought back "Ang Bagong Kampeon" for one more season despite the exodus of the hosts and Galvante. The short-lived season with the late comedian TV host Pepe Pimentel and another comedian singer actress Pinky Marquez as hosts.

== Awards and recognitions ==
- Best Talent Show Winner — PMPC Star Awards for Television (1987–1988)
