= Tanghalan ng Kampeon =

Philippine television reality show

- Genre: Reality competition
- Created by: Wilma V. Galvante
- Written by: Agnes Caballa
- Directed by: Al Quinn
- Presented by: Bert "Tawa" Marcelo; Pilita Corrales
- Country of origin: Philippines
- Original language: Tagalog

Production
- Executive producer: Susan Trinidad (1988–93)
- Production locations: German Moreno Studio, GMA Network Studios Annex, Quezon City, Philippines (2024)
- Camera setup: Multiple-camera setup
- Production company: GMA Entertainment Group

Original release
- Network: GMA Radio-Television Arts
- Release: 1988 – 1993

Related
- Ang Bagong Kampeon

Tanghalan ng Kampeon (transl. stage of a champion) is a Philippine television reality competition show broadcast by GMA Radio-Television Arts. Originally hosted by Bert "Tawa" Marcelo and Pilita Corrales, it premiered in 1988. The show concluded in 1993.

== Overview ==
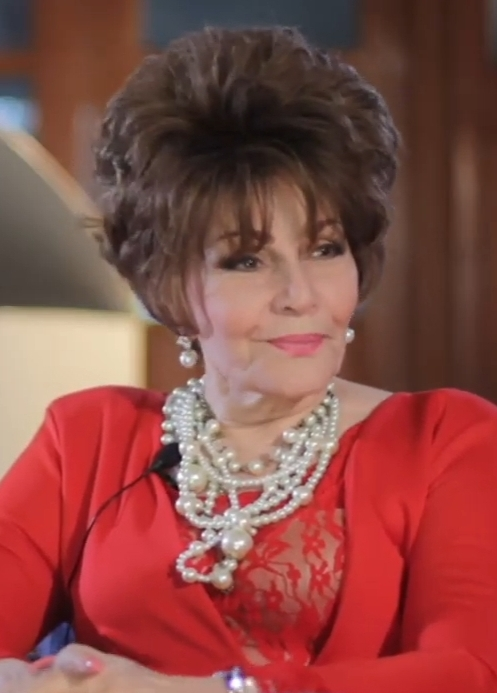
Pilita Corrales serves as a host.

Wilma V. Galvante created the show as Ang Bagong Kampeon in Radio Philippines Network. Actress-singer Pilita Corrales and late comedian Bert "Tawa" Marcelo served as the original hosts. The title was renamed to Tanghalan ng Kampeon, after the show moved to GMA Network in 1988. It was originally helmed by Al Quinn and Danny Tan was hired as the musical director.

Among the contestants and winners included singer Kyla.

In 2018, GMA Network gave the rights to Willie Revillame as a segment of his variety show Wowowin. It was planned for 2019 and didn't happen.

== Hosts ==
- Bert "Tawa" Marcelo (1988–93)
- Pilita Corrales (1988–93)

== Legacy ==
On February 12, 2024, Tanghalan ng Kampeon became a segment of the Philippine variety show TiktoClock, with Kim Atienza and Pokwang serving as the hosts.
