= Pilita Corrales =

Filipina singer (1939–2025)

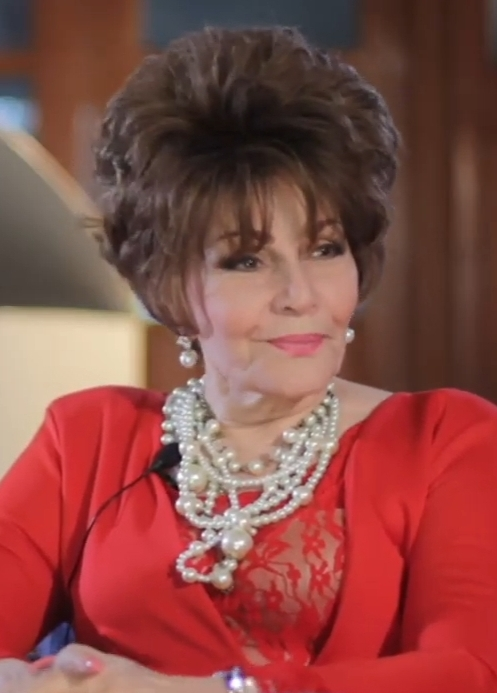
- Corrales in 2017

Background information
- Born: Pilar Corrales y Garrido; August 22, 1939; Lahug, Cebu, Philippines
- Died: April 12, 2025 (aged 85) Manila, Philippines
- Genres: Pop; soul; Visayan pop; Manila sound; OPM
- Occupations: Singer; actress; comedian; television presenter
- Instrument: Vocals
- Years active: 1957–2025
- Labels: Vicor Music Corporation; Aquarius Records

Pilar "Pilita" Garrido Corrales (August 22, 1939 – April 12, 2025) was a Filipino singer, actress and comedian. She was known for her distinctive backbend when singing and was popularly referred to as the "Greatest singer in the Philippines" and "Asia's Queen of Songs" for her vocal style and longevity.

Corrales recorded 135 albums throughout her six-decade career. Her recordings were mainly in English and Filipino, while on occasion she recorded songs in Spanish and Cebuano. Lauded for her sweet voice and iconic singing style, Corrales was one of the first superstars in the Philippines and became one of the first female artists to reach the top of the Australian pop charts. In 1963, her single "A Million Thanks to You" became one of few songs by a local artist to reach the number one position on the "Hits of the World" listing for the Philippines compiled by Billboard. "A Million Thanks to You" and other signature hits by Corrales, including "Kapantay ay Langit", have since become standards. She was a recipient of the prestigious 'Lifetime Achievement Award' by the Philippine Association of the Record Industry (PARI) for introducing Filipino musical artistry to a global audience.

Her success would later extend to film and television, where her show An Evening with Pilita is considered as one of the standards in Philippine broadcasting history.

== Early life ==
Pilar Corrales was born in Lahug, Cebu City on August 22, 1939, to José Corrales de Zaragoza and María Garrido Manzano. The second of six siblings, she grew up in a "conservative [and] affluent home" in Cebu City. Her "upper-class and mestizo Spanish" family speaking primarily Cebuano, with Spanish being her "second mother tongue". Her father José Corrales is a Spanish mestizo from Ermita, Manila and her mother Maria Garrido is a Spanish immigrant from Granada.

Her cousin, Annie Corrales, was Miss Philippines in 1957 and married businessman Eddie Woolbright. After completing her studies at Colegio de la Inmaculada Concepción in Cebu, she began attending Colegio Mayor de Padre Poveda, a finishing school in Spain, in 1955, one of the first Cebuanas to do so. She returned to the Philippines following her father's death from a heart attack in 1956. With the loss of her father's income, her mother began taking in boarders, and Corrales took a secretarial course. Corrales said that had her father not died when he did, she never would have become a singer.

== Career ==
Corrales' "vocal production [was] medial rather than frontal...with a consistent use of head resonation," resulting in a "rounded, covered quality rather than a bright timbre". Her vocal delivery was "on pitch with a notable absence of slides, glides, or bending the pitch," and she used vibrato "for any duration longer than a quarter note". She maintained her vocal technique across songs of different genres; for example, her performances of "Ang dalagang Pilipina" were not sung in the song's traditional bel canto style.

Corrales recorded songs in Spanish in the early 1960s and songs in English, Tagalog, and Cebuano during the 1970s under Vicor Music Corporation.

=== In Australia ===
In 1958, Corrales began her recording career after arriving in Australia for a brief period. She first appeared on Australian television on the show From Outer Space, and later appeared on The Bobby Limb Show and In Melbourne Tonight.She became a star of the Victoria Television circuit and her first hit, "Come Closer to Me", became part of a collection on which she was billed as one of the "Grand Dames of Victorian Radio and Television". She also recorded at least three LPs in the late 1950s and early 1960s: Pilita with Arthur Young: Pilita Tells the Story of Love (1959), I'll Take Romance (1960) and This Is Pilita under Astor Records. Being one of the pioneers of Australia's early television years, a street was named after her in Victoria. The Australian Broadcasting Corporation (ABC) featured Corrales and several pioneering female artists in Australia in the 2nd episode of the highly acclaimed TV special, Love is in the Air.

=== In the Philippines ===
Corrales returned to Manila in 1963 to pursue a career in the Philippine music industry. That same year, she recorded her hit "A Million Thanks to You". Her Philippine career began when she hosted a radio program La Taverna over DZPI where she sang Spanish songs and played the guitar. She performed regularly in stage shows at the Manila Grand Opera House. In 1966, she opened for The Beatles during their concert at Manila's Rizal Memorial Stadium. By 1967, she was hosting the TV program An Evening With Pilita on Channel 3.

Corrales appeared in movies, most of them musicals. Her film debut was a lead role in the 1967 film Miss Wawaw and was followed by 11 films for the next two years.

In 1972, Corrales' career exploded with the release of her album Philippine Love Songs, a compilation of pop covers of traditional songs, through Vicor Music. The album became a best seller. Among the songs on the album was "Kapantay ay Langit", George Canseco's Filipino translation of "You're All I Love". That year, she also performed at the inaugural Tokyo Music Festival, where she won the Best Performer award. At the 2nd edition of the festival in 1973, she won the award for Best Singer.

Aquarius Records Philippines produced a compilation of Pilita's Spanish songs on CDs like Noche de Ronda and Vaya Con Dios. Her signature song A Million Thanks to You by Alice Doria-Gamilla was translated into seven languages. She eventually recorded songs composed by Filipino composers like Danny Holmsen, George Canseco, Willy Cruz, Ryan Cayabyab and several others.

Corrales frequently performed for Seeing Stars with Joe Quirino on IBC-Channel 13 after the martial law years (1972–1981), where she demonstrated her range as a performer of Spanish, English, Cebuano and Tagalog music.

Through the personal invitation of Sammy Davis Jr., Corrales became the first Filipino to sing at Caesars Palace in the late 1970s, during which she sang Spanish, English, Cebuano, and Tagalog songs, all conducted and arranged by Ryan Cayabyab.

By 2006, she operated a restaurant bar in Greenhills named Pilita's.

In 2006, Corrales was selected by Associated Broadcasting Company (now TV5 Network) and FremantleMedia to be one of the celebrity judges for the first-ever nationwide search for the Philippine Idol together with Ryan Cayabyab and rapper Francis Magalona. She was a judge in the first Asian Idol held in Indonesia, representing Philippine Idol.

== Personal life and death ==
Corrales had two children, Jackie Lou Blanco and Ramón Christopher. Corrales was married in 1963 to the Spanish executive businessman Jose Blanco and separated while Jackie Lou was still a child. Jose died in 1979.

Corrales gave birth to her second child, Ramón Christopher Gutierrez, in 1969. Ramón Christopher's father is Filipino actor Eddie Gutierrez. In September 2001, Corrales married Paraguayan/Australian businessman Carlos López.

Corrales died in her sleep at her residence on April 12, 2025. She was 85. On May 4, Corrales was posthumously conferred with the Presidential Medal of Merit from President Bongbong Marcos for her services to the arts.

== Filmography ==
=== Film ===
| Year | Title | Role | Notes | Ref |
|---|---|---|---|---|
| N/A | Port of Escape | | Shot in 1960; unfinished | |
| 1967 | Miss Wawaw | | Directed by Efren Reyes | |
| 1988 | Mirror, Mirror on the Wall | Caring / Caridad | | |
| 1994 | Mars Ravelo's Darna! Ang Pagbabalik | Valentina | | |
| 2014 | Bride for Rent | Avelina "Lala" Corazon | | |
| 2014 | Basement | Lola Meding | | |
| 2014 | My Illegal Wife | Lala | | |
| 2016 | Enteng Kabisote 10 and the Abangers | | | |

=== Television ===
| Year | Title | Role | Ref. |
|---|---|---|---|
| 1964–1972 | Your Evening with Pilita | Host | |
| 1967–1972 | Dance-O-Rama | | |
| | Seeing Stars with Joe Quirino | | |
| 1985–1988 | Ang Bagong Kampeon | Host, together with Bert Marcelo | |
| 1988–1993 | Tanghalan Ng Kampeon | Host, together with Bert Marcelo | |
| 1988, 1993 | Ryan Ryan Musikahan | Guest Performer | |
| 1990–1993 | Mag-Asawa'y Di Biro | | |
| 1991–1993 | Awitawanan | | |
| 1997 | Awitanghalan | | |
| 2003–2007 | Lagot Ka, Isusumbong Kita | Rosa/Mamita | |
| 2006 | Philippine Idol | Judge | |
| 2007 | Love Spell Presents: Cindy-rella | | |
| 2007 | Celebrity Duets Season 1 | Duet partner for Frederick Peralta | |
| | Asian Idol | Judge | |
| 2008 | Celebrity Duets Season 2 | Duet partner for Bayani Fernando | |
| | Talentadong Pinoy | Judge | |
| | Show Me Da Manny | | |
| 2009–2010 | Full House | Anita Lazatin | |
| 2010–2011 | My Driver Sweet Lover | Maximilliana "Abuela Maxi" Barrinuevo | |
| | Toda Max | Lola Momsie | |
| 2012 | The X Factor Philippines | Judge | |
| 2013–2016 | Vampire Ang Daddy Ko | Sonya Ventura | |
| February 28, 2015 | Maynila: YOLO si LOLA | | |
| February 25, 2016 | Eat Bulaga!: Just Duet | Performer | |
| March 12, 2016 | Maynila: My Classmate | | |
| September 11, 2016 | Hay, Bahay! | Amelia | |
| 2018 | Sana Dalawa ang Puso | Leonora Chavez (guest cast) | |
| 2019, 2023 | Bravo Executive Lounge | Guest Performer | |
| 2020 | Tawag ng Tanghalan Season 4 | Judge | |
| 2020–2021 | Kesayasaya | Mommy G | |

== Discography ==
=== Albums ===
==== Australia ====
- Come Closer to Me
- Pilita with Arthur Young: I'll Take Romance (1960, Astor Records)
- This Is Pilita
- Pilita Tells the Story of Love

==== Philippines (including albums released internationally) ====
- Pilita, Live at the Riviera (recorded in Hong Kong in 1976)
- Pilita, Live at the Riviera Vol. 2 (recorded in Hong Kong in 1976)
- Pilita, Live at the Riviera Vol. 3 (recorded in Hong Kong in 1977)
- Pilita, Now
- Pilita Sings
- Para Ti Mama
- Love
- Pilita in Motion
- Pilita Corrales: Greatest Hits
- Pilita: Greatest Hits Vol. 2
- Matud Nila (Cebuano)
- Philippine Love Songs
- Philippine Love Songs Vol. 2
- Kapantay Ay Langit
- A Song for You
- Sampaguita
- Best of Philippine Pop Songs
- Sa Tanang Panahon (mostly Cebuano versions of Tagalog songs)
- Minamahal, Sinasamba
- Oh La La! (1971)
- For Love's Sake Only (1971)
- Pilita in Tokyo (1972)
- Filipiniana (1972, Vicor)
- Pilita: The Queen of Songs (Ang Mutya ng Awit)
- Pilita, Christmas Special
- Gaano Kadalas ang Minsan?
- The Best of Philippine Music
- Salakot
- Pagsapit ng Pasko
- Araw-araw, Gabi-gabi
- Pilita: Visayan Love Songs Vol. 1 (Cebuano)
- Pilita Sings George (If I Had My Life to Live Again)
- Pilita: Great Songs from Filipino Movies
- Sa Aking Pag-iisa
- Walang Pagmamaliw
- Pilita Sings...Love Themes from Viva Films
- Pilita y Amado en Español
- Pilita Y Amado en Español, Vol. 2
- Pilita Goes Pop (OctoArts now PolyEast Records, 1990)
- Ang Nag-iisang si Pilita (Viva Records, 1993)
- Together at Last (with Elmo Makuil) (Quantum Music Corporation, 1996)
- When My Eyes Are Filled with Tears (Dyna Records)
- The Best of Love Duets (Viva Collection Forever) (Viva Records, 1998)
- Pilita Corrales Sings Visayan Songs (Cebuano) (Villar)
- If You Go Away
- Hoy
- Pilita y los mensajeros del Paraguay
- Viajar ("Travel")
- Abrázame ("Embrace Me")
- Yukbo sa Bisayanhong Awit (Cebuano and Ilonggo duet album with Susan Fuentes)
- A Million Thanks to You

=== Recorded songs ===
- "A Million Thanks to You"
- "Ako Raw ay Makasalanan"
- "Ampingan Mo Ba"
- "Ang Dalaga Noon at Ngayon"
- "Ang Diwa ng Pasko"
- "Ang Kawayan"
- "Ang Pag-ibig"
- "Ang Pag-ibig ay Mahiwaga"
- "Ang Pipit"
- "Ang Tangi Kong Pag-ibig"
- "Apat na Dahilan"
- "Awit ng Labandera"
- "Awit ng Mananahi"
- "Ay Pag-ibig"
- "Ay, Ay, Ay Pag-ibig"
- "Ayaw nang Magmahal"
- "Bakas ng Lumipas"
- "Bakasin Mo sa Gunita"
- "Bakit Kita Inibig"
- "Balud sa Kalimot"
- "Balut"
- "Baryo Fiesta"
- "Basta't Magkasama Tayo"
- "Basta't Mahal Kita"
- "Bisan sa Damgo Lang"
- "Buhat"
- "Bulak Akong Bukidnon"
- "Cariñosa"
- "Come Close and Love Me"
- "Dahil sa Isang Bulaklak"
- "Dahil sa Iyo"
- "Dalagang Pilipina"
- "Dalagang Pilipinhon"
- "Dalawang Filipina"
- "Di Ko Kasalanan"
- "Di na Iibig"
- "Dili na Mausab"
- "Gipangita Ko Ikaw"
- "Goodbye"
- "Had I Known It"
- "Hanggang Langit Mahal Kita"
- "Hinahanap Kita"
- "Hinugpong nga Mga Awit"
- "Hiwaga ng Pag-ibig"
- "Huling Halakhak"
- "Ibong Kakanta-kanta"
- "If I Had My Life to Live Again"
- "Iibigin Ka"
- "Ikaw ang Mahal Ko"
- "Ikaw Na Lamang"
- "Iniibig Kita"
- "Ipagdarasal Kita"
- "Irog Ako ay Mahalin"
- "Isumbong Ko Ikaw sa Langit"
- "Iyong-iyo Kailan pa Man"
- "Kahit Sino Ka Man"
- "Kamingaw Gayud"
- "Kapantay ay Langit" (original by Amapola in 1970)
- "Kataka-taka"
- "Katulog na Inday"
- "Kay Hirap ng Umibig"
- "Kay Langit Ko ang Gugma Mo"
- "Kung Batid Mo Lamang"
- "Kung Kita'y Kapiling"
- "Kung Nagsasayaw Kita"
- "Lahat ng Araw"
- "Lahat ng Gabi Bawat Araw"
- "Lahat ng Oras"
- "Lamok"
- "Landas sa Pag-ibig"
- "Larawan ng Pag-ibig"
- "Let's Forget the Time"
- "Lihim na Damdamin"
- "Lonely Nights"
- "Luluha Ka Rin"
- "Maalaala Mo Kaya"
- "Magandang Gabi Po"
- "Mahal Kita Hanggang Langit"
- "Mahal Mo Ba Ako?"
- "Mahiwaga"
- "Mamang Tsuper"
- "Mangga"
- "Mano Po Ninong"
- "Matagal na Rin"
- "Matud Nila"
- "May Ibong Kakanta Kanta"
- "Minamahal Kita"
- "Minamahal Ko Siya"
- "Minsan Ay Nakasama Kita"
- "Nahigwa-os"
- "No puede ser" (Spanish version of "Minamahal Kita")
- "O Maliwanag na Buwan"
- "Paano"
- "Pag-ibig Ikaw ang Dahilan"
- "Pagka't Kapiling Ka"
- "Pagkadali"
- "Pasko sa Nayon"
- "Patatawarin Kita"
- "Pilipinas"
- "Pobreng Alindahaw"
- "Porbida"
- "Puto Kutsinta"
- "Rosas Pandan"
- "Sa Araw ng Pasko (Ikaw Lang ang Siyang Kailangan)"
- "Sa Bawat Sandali"
- "Sa Libis ng Nayon"
- "Saan Ka Man Naroroon"
- "Salakot"
- "Salamat sa Alaala"
- "Sampaguita"
- "Sana Kahit Minsan" (original by Ariel Rivera)
- "Sapagkat Ikaw ay Akin"
- "Sapagkat Kami ay Tao Lamang"
- "Sapagkat Malapit Na"
- "Sayaw sa Ilaw"
- "Sayo sa Kabuntagon"
- "Sinumpa Ko sa Diyos"
- "Sumpang Walang Hanggan"
- "Tama Na"
- "The Shadow of Your Smile" (live in Toronto)
- "Titibok-Tibok"
- "Together"
- "Together at Last" (duet with Elmo Makil)
- "Tugoti Kami"
- "Tunay na Tunay"
- "Ulilang Puso"
- "Walang Kapantay"
- "When Eyes Are Filled with Tears"
- "Yesterday I Heard the Rain"
- "Noche de Ronda"
- "Vaya con Dios"
- "Historia de un amor"
- "Abrázame"
- "Obsesión"
- "Gracias amigo"
- "Solamente una vez"
- "Espérame en el cielo"
- "La foto"
- "Hasta el fin de mi existir"
- "Con estas manos"
- "Filipinas"
- "Tema del padrino"
- "Grande, grande, grande"
- "A flor de piel"
- "Quisiera saber"
- "Desde que tú has ido"
- "Tu sonrisa"
- "Concierto de un otoño"
- "Perfidia"
- "Aldila"
- "Angustia"
- "Río rebelde"
- "Voy"
- "Amor"
- "Waray-Waray"
- "Nganong Mipakita Ka"
- "Sayri Ako"
- "Ngano Ba Gugma"
- "Ampinging mga Bulak"
- "Ilingaw-Lingaw Lang"
- "Mao Ba Kini ang Gugma"
- "Hain Ka na Pinangga"
- "Uhaw sa Gugma"

== Awards and honors ==
- 1965 Philippine Citizen's Award for TV as Best TV Female Performer
- Best Performer Award, 1972 Tokyo Music Festival
- Best Singer Award, 1973 Tokyo Music Festival
- 1990 Merit Award, the FAMAS Awards
- 1991 Lifetime Achievement Award, the Philippine Association of the Record Industry (PARI), for introducing Filipino musical artistry to a global audience
- 2024 Billboard Philippines Women in Music Icon Award
- Honorary Doctorate in Music degree, the University of the Visayas, for her contribution to the Philippine music industry
- Awit Award, PARI
- Recognized as one of the 'Great Dames of Victorian Radio and Television' and has a street named after her in Melbourne, Australia
- Presidential Medal of Merit, posthumously awarded in 2025
