= St. Mary's Academy of San Nicolas =

Roman Catholic school in Cebu City, Philippines

- Former names: Saint Nicholas Academy
- Motto: Initium Sapientiae Timor Domini (Latin)
- Motto in English: The fear of the Lord is the beginning of wisdom.
- Type: Private Roman Catholic Coeducational Basic education institution
- Established: 1966
- Parent institution: St. Mary's College of Quezon City
- Religious affiliation: Roman Catholic (RVM Sisters)
- Location: Tomas Abella St., Cebu City, Cebu, Philippines; 10°17′35″N 123°53′28″E
- Campus: Urban
- Patroness: Our Lady of Fatima
- Colors: Blue and White
- Nickname: Marians
- Location in Visayas St. Mary's Academy of San Nicolas (Philippines)

St. Mary's Academy of San Nicolas, formerly known as Saint Nicholas Academy, is a Catholic private school in Cebu City, Philippines run and partially owned by the Religious of the Virgin Mary (RVM). The school has affiliation with the Archdiocesan Shrine of San Nicolas Parish. It offers Kindergarten, Grade School, and High School curricula for boys and girls.

== See also ==
- Mother Ignacia del Espíritu Santo
- List of parishes in Cebu
