= St. Mary's Academy of Caloocan City =

Roman Catholic school in Caloocan, Philippines

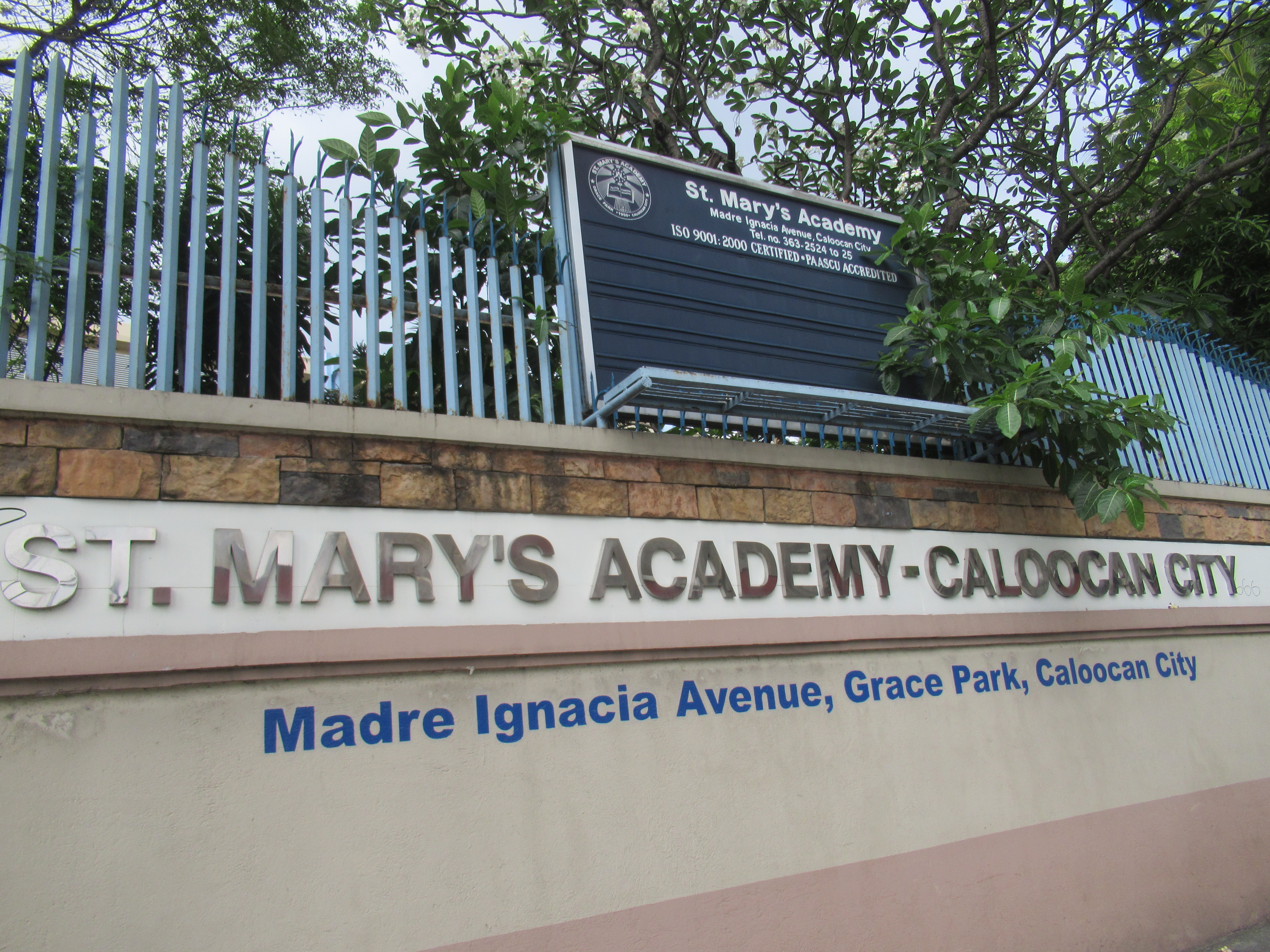

Location
- Madre Ignacia Avenue., Grace Park, Caloocan, Metro Manila; Philippines
- Coordinates: 14°39′17″N 120°59′35″E

Information
- Former names: Our Lady of Grace Academy (1950-2000)
- Type: Private Roman Catholic Coeducational Basic education institution
- Motto: Initium Sapientiae Timor Domini (Latin) (The fear of the Lord is the beginning of wisdom)
- Religious affiliations: Roman Catholic (RVM Sisters)
- Established: 1950
- Directress / Principal: Sr.Derrick Mendez RVM
- Campus: Urban
- Colors: Blue and White
- Nickname: Marians
- Affiliation: PAASCU
- Alma Mater song: Marian Hymn
- Website: www.smacc.edu.ph

St. Mary's Academy of Caloocan City, also referred to by its acronym SMACC, is a private Catholic, coeducational basic education institution owned and administered by the Sisters of the Religious of the Virgin Mary (RVM) in Grace Park, Caloocan, Metro Manila, Philippines. It was formerly named Our Lady of Grace Academy (OLGA) and was renamed to SMACC on December 8, 2000 when the school marked its Golden Jubilee to comply with the RVM's school system. SMACC is located at Madre Ignacia Avenue (12th Ave.), Grace Park, Caloocan.

== History ==
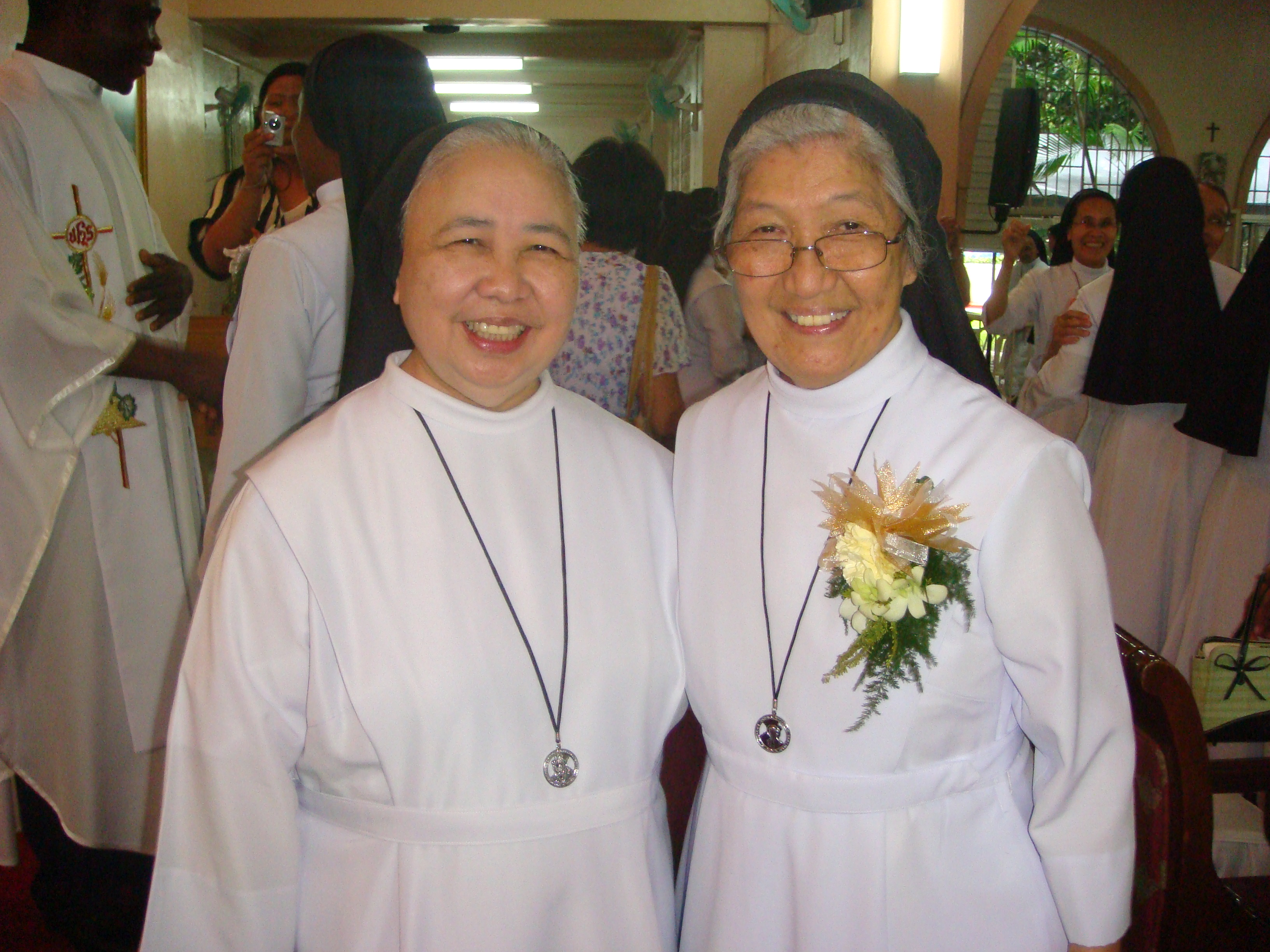
Maria Evelyn C. Aguilar & Sister Ma. Raquel A. Reodica in August 2012

In 1969, the High School Department transferred to 12th Avenue while the Grade School and Pre-Elementary Departments followed in 1981, leaving the original school building to the priests of the Missionary Oblates of Mary Immaculate (OMI). In response to the challenge to offer quality education, the school decided to pursue PAASCU accreditation. The preliminary visit was conducted in 1983 and its formal visit was in 1985. In 1988, the school was granted five-year accreditation which was followed by two more revisits, in 1994 and in 1999.

Established initially as an all-girls school, the then Our Lady of Grace Academy, along with its neighboring all-boys school, Notre Dame of Greater Manila opened its doors to coeducation in 1999.

When Basic Education Curriculum (BEC) 2002 was launched by the Department of Education, SMACC adopted the Basic Education Department, which reflects a continuous and sequential development from Grades 1 to 10. The Grade School was renamed the Lower Basic Education Department (LBED) and the High School, Upper Basic Education Department (UBED). During the 2003–2004 school year, the school worked for a certification of its quality management system. On June 25, 2004, the institution was awarded an ISO 9001-2000 certification. SMACC is the first ISO-certified school in all of Caloocan.
