= Bert Marcelo =

Filipino television personality

- Born: Norberto Joya Marcelo; June 6, 1936; Baliwag, Bulacan, Commonwealth of the Philippines
- Died: December 16, 1995 (aged 59); Quezon City, Philippines
- Resting place: Baliwag Municipal Cemetery
- Other name: Tawa
- Education: Far Eastern University (BA)
- Occupations: Actor, comedian, TV personality
- Years active: 1967–1995
- Political party: Nationalist People's Coalition (1995)
- Spouse: Alicia Castro
- Children: 4

Norberto "Bert" Joya Marcelo Sr. (June 6, 1936 – December 16, 1995) was a Filipino actor, comedian, and television personality. His trademark high-pitched infectious laughter earned him the popular moniker "Tawa", the Tagalog word for laughter.

== Background ==
Born in Baliuag, Bulacan, Marcelo's persona as the Filipino everyman, enhanced by his eloquency in the Tagalog language and his easy-going friendly nature, made him ideal as the most recognized endorser of the popular San Miguel Beer. Apart from his classic commercials for San Miguel Beer such as Isang Platitong Mani (A Saucerful of Peanuts), Marcelo was also best known as the co-host with Pilita Corrales in Ang Bagong Kampeon (The New Champion), a long-running television talent show which discovered Regine Velasquez (then-known as Chona) and among other talents. He was also an occasional actor in films, as well in television sitcoms such as Baltic and Company in 1974. Aside from his work on television, he also had a stint on radio, as he became one of the announcers who worked with the now defunct DWWW 630 (owned by Radio Philippines Network) in the '80s.

In 1991, after throwing a joke on Rudy Fernandez in an awards night at CCP Main Theater, Fernandez approached to him in the backstage and said: 'Sa susunod, huwag mo akong lolokohin! Huwag mo akong mabiru-biro nang ganyan!' (Next time, don't fool me; don't throw jokes at me like that!).

== Personal life ==
He was married to Alicia Trinidad Castro; they had four sons.

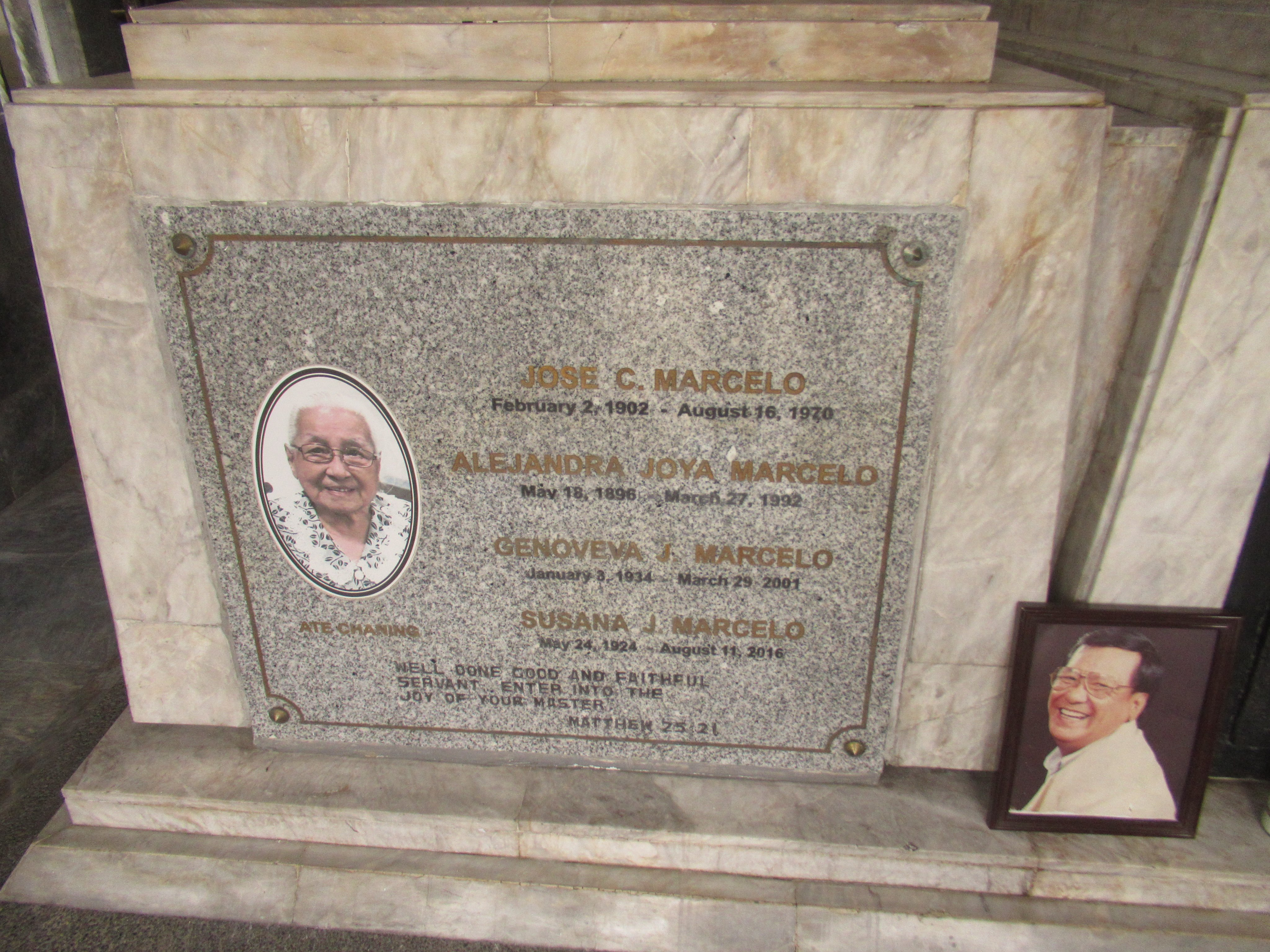
Marcelo family graves

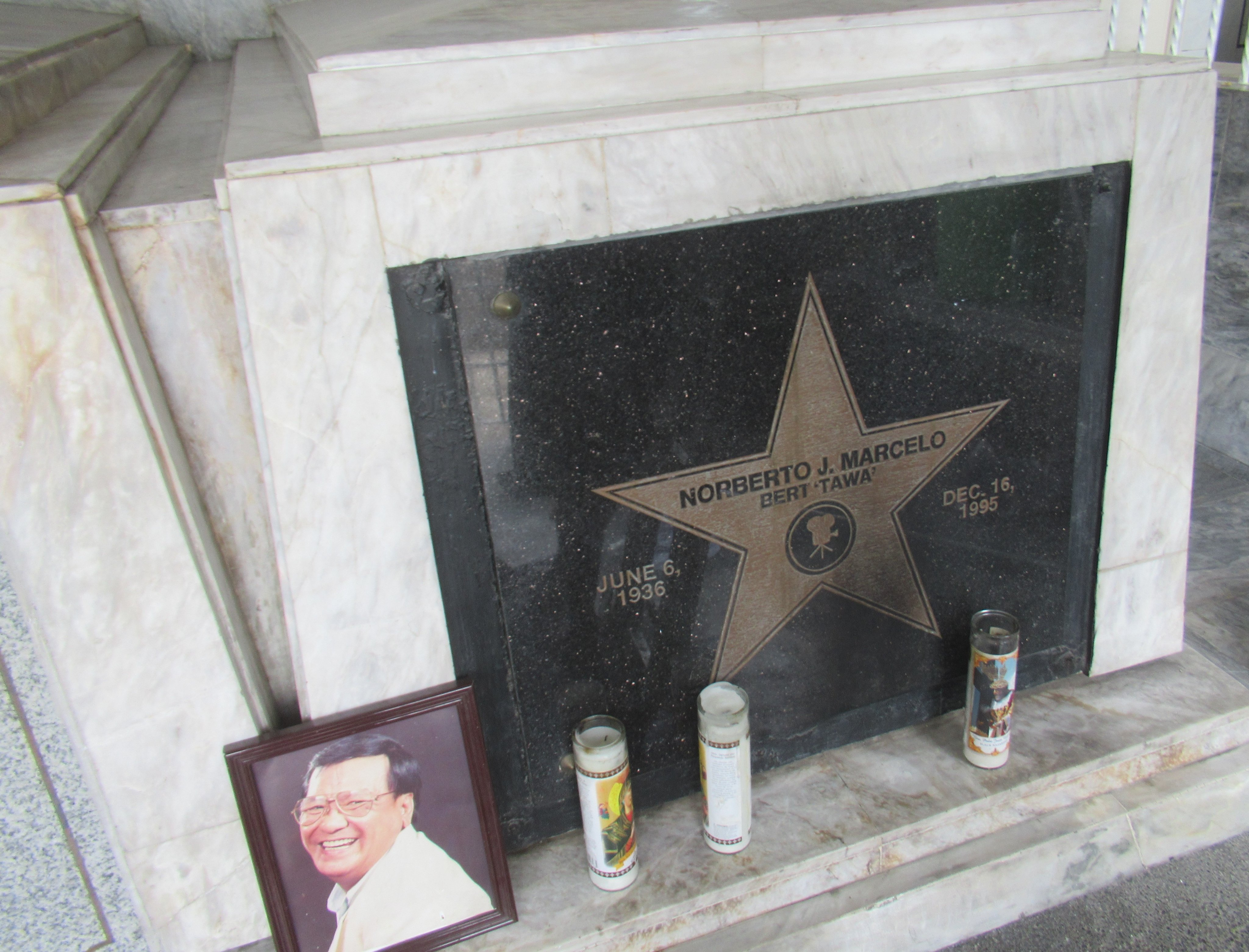
Marcelo tomb

== Death ==
Marcelo died at the peak of his career when he suffered a fatal stroke on December 16, 1995 at St. Luke's Medical Center, months after losing his gubernatorial bid. He was laid to rest at Municipal Cemetery in Baliuag, Bulacan, beside Jose C. Marcelo (February 2, 1902 – August 16, 1970), Aljandra Joya Marcelo (May 18, 1896 – March 27, 1992), Genoveva Joya Marcelo, Susana Joya Marcelo, Benita Marcelo, and Girlie V. Marcelo.

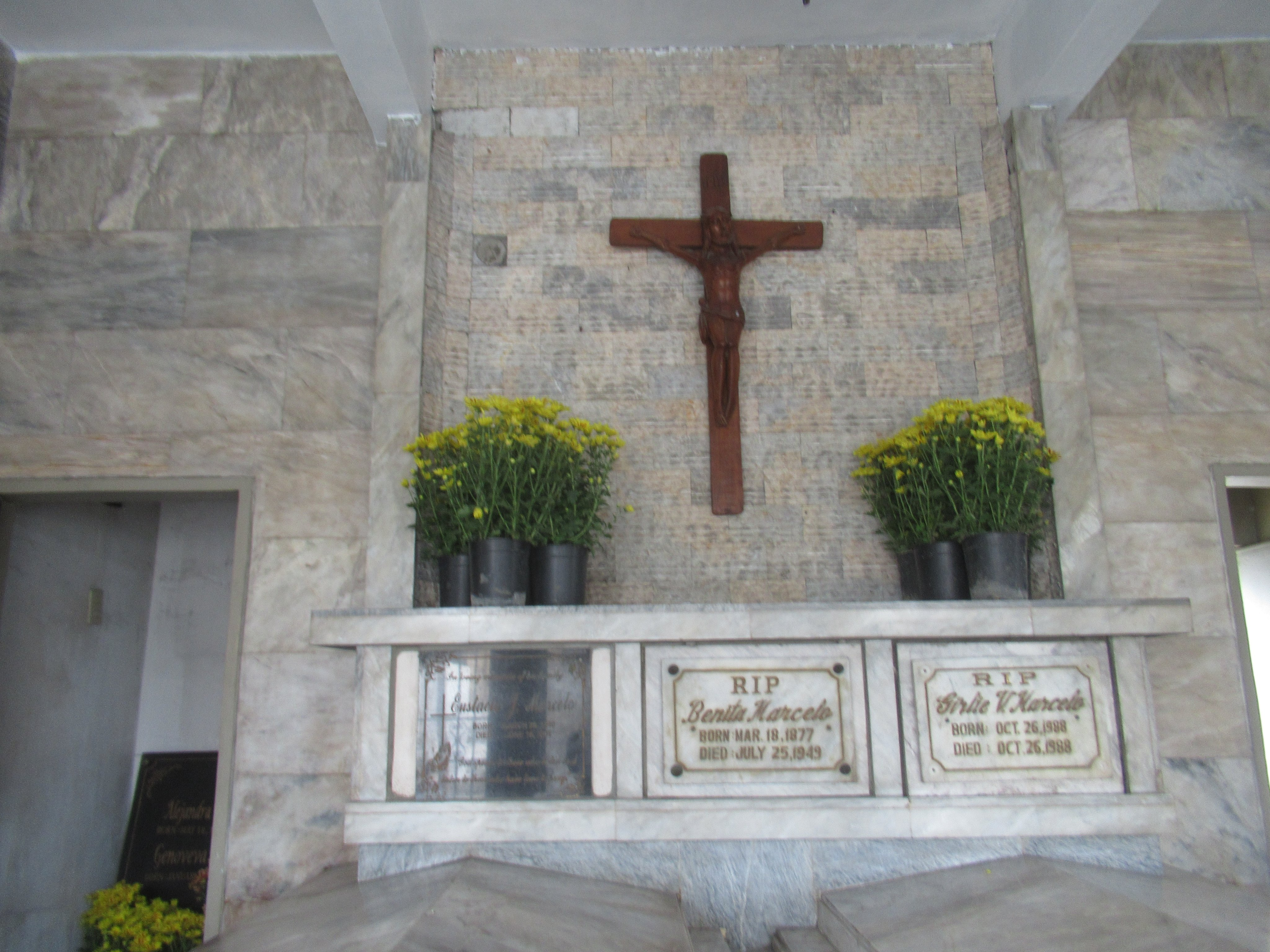
Marcelo mausoleum

== Legacy ==
He was portrayed by comedian Jose Manalo on an episode in Magpakailanman in 2003.

== Filmography ==
=== Film ===
- Pomposa: Ang Kabayong Tsismosa (1968)
- Tore ng Diyablo (1969)
- Teenage Escapades! (1969)
- Brownout (1969)
- Tisoy (1969)
- D' Musical Teenage Idols! (1969)
- Padre, si Eba (1971)
- Ang Pangalan Ko'y Luray (1971)
- The Panther (1973)
- Oh Margie Oh (1974)
- Hindi Kami Damong Ligaw (1976)
- Wanakosey (1977)
- Tisoy! (1977)
- Kapten Batuten en his Super Batuta (1977)
- Mga Mata ni Angelita (1978)
- Tadhana (television film, 1978) – Tausi
- Isang Platitong Mani (1985)
- Payaso (1986)
- Everlasting Love (1989)

=== Television ===
- Baltic and Company (1974–1976)
- Prinsipe Abante (1977–1981)
- Kalatog Pinggan (1985–1986/1987–1988)
- Ang Bagong Kampeon (1985–1988)
- Tanghalan ng Kampeon (1987–1993)
- Agrisiyete (1991–1995) - his last TV appearance
