= Saint Mary's Academy of Capiz =

Roman Catholic school in Capiz, Philippines

Location
- 2537 P. Burgos St., Roxas City, Capiz; Philippines
- Coordinates: 11°35′10″N 122°44′59″E

Information
- Former name: Immaculate Conception Academy (1947-)
- Type: Private Roman Catholic Coeducational Basic education institution
- Motto: Latin: Initium Sapientiae Timor Domini (The fear of the Lord is the beginning of wisdom)
- Religious affiliations: Roman Catholic (RVM Sisters)
- Established: 1947; 79 years ago
- Principal: Remy M. Villaraiz
- Campus: Urban
- Colors: Blue and White
- Nickname: Marians
- Affiliation: PAASCU FAAP CPSA
- Alma Mater song: Thy Banner Blue and White
- sporting_affiliation: Capiz Private Schools Athletic Association
- Website: www.smacapiz.edu.ph/home

Saint Mary's Academy of Capiz, also known by its acronym SMAC or St. Mary's, is a private, Catholic basic education institution run by the Religious of the Virgin Mary in Roxas City, Capiz, Philippines. It was founded in 1947.

== Academic offerings ==
From 1947–2015, the school used the 1945-2011 basic education curriculum which consisted of levels from kindergarten to fourth year high school. Starting in 2012–2013 onward, SMAC applied the "Enhanced Basic Education Act of 2013", to which Filipinos refer to as K–12 law. The K–12 basic education program took full effect and shape at the start of academic year 2016-2017 when it opened its senior high school department.

- Preschool - Kindergarten
- Elementary - Grades 1–6
- Junior High School - Grades 7–10

SENIOR HIGH SCHOOL OFFERINGS: (With Government Permit SHS 105, s.o. 2016)

- STEM (Science, Technology, Engineering, Mathematics)
- ABM (Accountancy, Business and Management)
