= St. Mary's University (Addis Ababa) =

Private higher education institution in Addis Ababa, Ethiopia

Coordinates: 9°0′47″N 38°44′50″E

- ቅድስት ማርያም ዩኒቨርስቲ
- Type: Private university
- Established: 1998
- Academic affiliations: Open University of Tanzania
- President and Founder: Associate Professor Wondwosen Tamrat
- Students: 30,000
- Undergraduates: 6,017 + 22000 (distance learners)
- Postgraduates: 2000
- Address: Mexico Square next to Wabi Shebele Hotel; Addis Ababa; BT12 6FE, Addis Ababa, Ethiopia
- Affiliations: OUT
- Website: http://www.smuc.edu.et

St. Mary's University is a private higher education institution located in the capital Addis Ababa, Ethiopia. After fifteen years of service as a college first and a university college since 2008, it earned university status from the Ethiopian Ministry of Education in September 2013.

The university has four campuses in Addis Ababa, 13 Distance Education Regional Centers, and 160 Coordination Offices throughout the country. It has 200 full-time academic staff and 1000 employees. It caters to the needs of six thousand undergraduate students, twenty thousand students enrolled in distance education programs, and two thousand students in graduate programs.

Eight graduate programs are run in partnership with Indira Gandhi National Open University. These programs include Business Administration, Public Administration, Library and Information Science, Sociology, Economics, Commerce, Rural Development and Political Science in the distance mode of learning.

In the conventional mode of learning, St. Mary's is accredited for ten graduate programs: MBA, HRM, Project Management, Accounting and Finance, Marketing management, Development Economics, Computer Science, Agribusiness, Agricultural Economics and Rural Development. The university has a testing center that provides standardized tests, job placement tests, and international tests such as the IBT- TOEFL and GRE.

St. Mary's has opened a K-12 school that is widening its reach in the realms of general education. The United States Embassy in Addis Ababa manages the Col. John C. Robinson American Corner on the university campus, connecting St. Mary's students with international learning opportunities, study abroad programs, English language learning and additional academic resources.

== Research ==
For research, St. Mary's organises conferences and workshops, and publishes research journals, proceedings and bulletins. Among such efforts is the annual international research conference on private higher education and held since 2003.

In 2025, the university hosted the 23rd International Conference on Private Higher Education in Africa, where the Ethiopian minister of Education outlined the government's plans to limit academic dishonesty from artificial intelligence.

== Memberships ==
St. Mary's is a founding member of Ethiopian Private Higher Education Institutions Association, a member of the Association of African Universities, African Quality Assurance Network (AfriQan), and an associate member of the International Network for Quality Assurance Agencies in Higher Education and International Council for Distance Education.

== See also ==
- Education in Ethiopia
- List of universities and colleges in Ethiopia
