= St. Mary's College of Meycauayan =

Roman Catholic college in Bulacan, Philippines

St. Mary's College of Meycauayan, Inc.
- Dalubhasaang Santa Maria ng Meykawayan (Filipino)
- Former names: Escuela Parroquial de Meycauayan; Escuela Catolica de Meycauayan; St. Mary's Academy of Meycauayan; St. Mary's College of Meycauayan
- Motto: Initium Sapientiae Timor Domini (Latin)
- Motto in English: The fear of the Lord is the beginning of wisdom
- Type: Private Roman Catholic Non-profit Coeducational Basic and Higher education institution
- Established: 1916
- Religious affiliation: Roman Catholic (RVM Sisters)
- Academic affiliations: PAASCU
- President: Sr. Ma. Marissa Ardeta, RVM
- Principal: Ms. Rheena Soquila
- Dean: Mrs. Guadella Ignacio
- Location: Meycauayan, Bulacan, Philippines; 14°44′23″N 120°57′35″E
- Campus: Saluysoy, Meycauayan, Bulacan
- Patroness: Blessed Virgin Mary
- Colors: Blue and White
- Nickname: Marians
- Website: smcm.edu.ph
- Location in Bulacan Location in Luzon Location in the Philippines

St. Mary's College of Meycauayan, Inc. (St. Mary's College, St. Mary's, ESMA, SMCMI) is a Catholic school in Meycauayan, Bulacan, Philippines. It is administered by the Religious of the Virgin Mary. It was formerly called Escuela Parroquial de Meycauayan, and was founded in 1916. It provides Preparatory, Primary, Secondary, and Tertiary education.

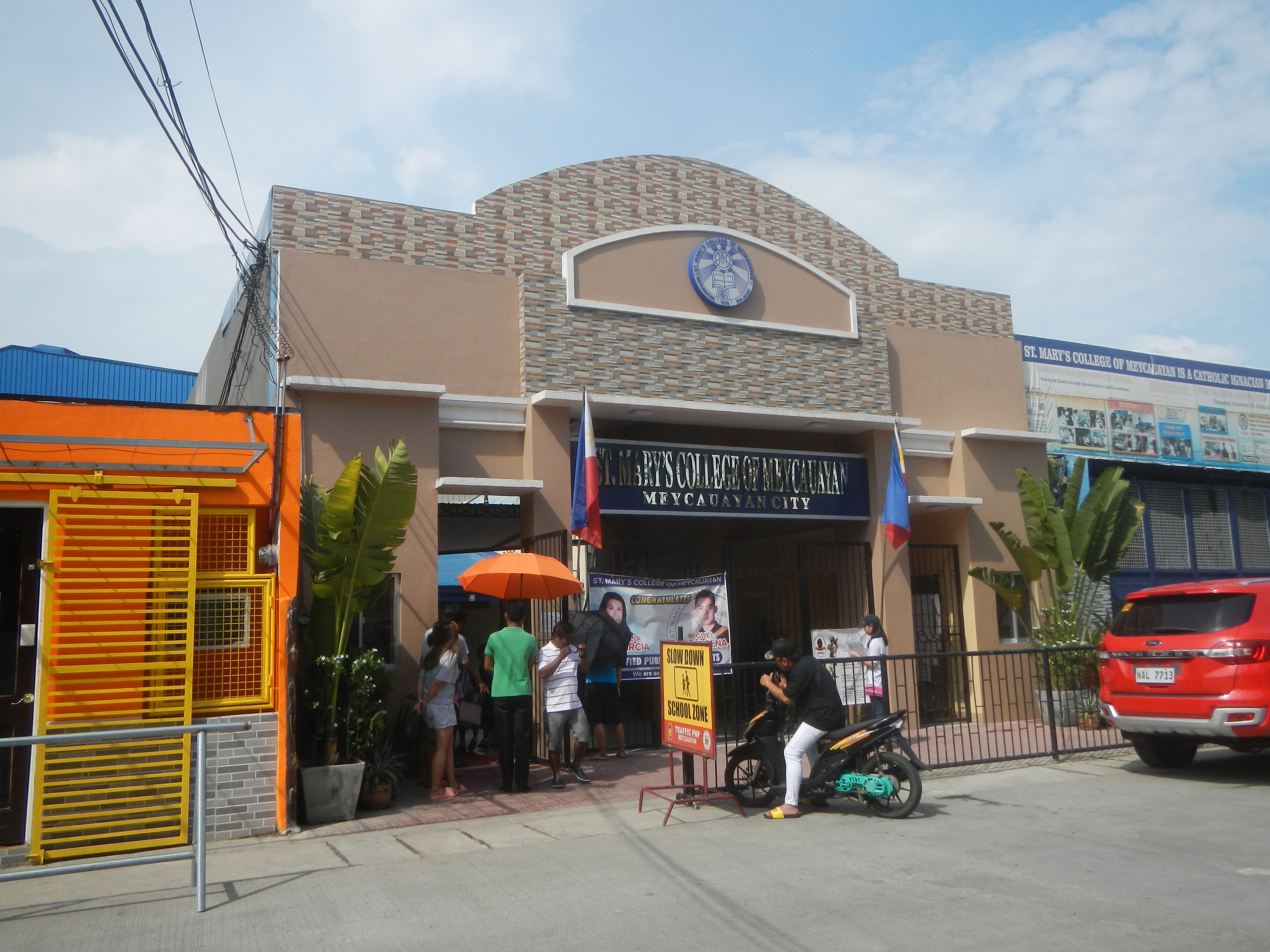
Facade, 2019

== History ==
St. Mary's College of Meycauayan, Inc., formerly called Escuela Parroquial de Meycauayan, Escuela Catolica de Meycauayan, St. Mary's Academy of Meycauayan and St. Mary's College of Meycauayan, was founded in 1916 as a Parochial School offering the primary course with Catechism as its core subject. It was and is still managed and administered by the Religious of the Virgin Mary (RVM), the first Filipino Congregation founded in 1684 by a Filipina, Mother Ignacia del Espiritu Santo.

During the Second World War, classes were temporarily suspended in June 1944 and were reopened in July 1945 with the Intermediate and First Year High School classes. March 1949 marked the graduation of the first ten High School seniors of the then St. Mary's Academy.

The school building was razed by fire on April 4, 1949. Rev. M. Ma. Justina Martinez, Superior, and M. Dolores Verceles, Principal, managed to continue the school's operation by holding classes in private houses while a two-storey building was being constructed.

After some interruptions, a two-storey semi-concrete structure was finally completed in 1954. Eleven (11) years later the kindergarten course was recognized.

School Year 1962–1963 was a significant year for the school as she received an award of 25 Spanish dictionaries from the Spanish Embassy in Manila for having topped all other schools in Spanish in the National Government Examinations administered in March 1962.

As the school population increased, the need for physical expansion arose. In August 1962, negotiations between the school and Mr. & Mrs. Vicente Floro paved the way for purchasing the lot on which St. Mary's College of Meycauayan, Inc. now stands. Construction of the first two rooms began in May of the same year. A six-room annexe was completed and came into use in 1966. A four-storey building was erected in 1968 and an extension of four rooms was made in 1978.

One of the most significant improvements of St. Mary's Academy was the completion of a concrete four-storey building in October 1981 marking the complete transfer of the whole school from kindergarten to high school. Aside from classrooms, the new building included administrative offices, a guidance office, science and reading laboratories, a library, a medical/dental clinic, and audio-visual and conference rooms.

To meet the needs of the increasing school population, additional classrooms were constructed facing the MacArthur Highway.

A seven-room Kindergarten building was erected at the back of the administration/elementary building. The construction was completed in October 1984.

Considering the demands of the Education Apostolate, the school opened its doors to the students at the tertiary level in 1986. The courses offered were Bachelor of Elementary Education (BEED) with specialization in preschool education, English, Filipino, Mathematics, Social Studies, Science and Health; Bachelor of Science in Commerce (BSC) major in accounting, Management, Financial Management, Marketing and Computer Applications.

The yearly marked increase in enrolment in the three levels needed more classrooms. Thus a new four-storey building was constructed with 26 classrooms including the new library, faculty room, home economics room and offices for the guidance and subject area coordinators.

Msgr. Sabino Vengco blessed the Multi-Purpose Hall on January 22, 1989, in the presence of the RVM sisters, teachers, students, sponsors, and guests. This Multi-Purpose Hall provides adequate space for school programs/activities, and PE classes and is shared with the public for seminars/workshops and other similar gatherings.

A significant event in 1989 was the launching the Movement for the Beatification of Mother Ignacia del Espiritu Santo by the RVM communities of SMCMI and St. Mary's Academy of Sto. Niño at the St. Francis of Assisi Parish Church on October 28 of that year. The rites were participated in by Rev. Fr. Pablo Reyes, parish priest; Fr. Antonio Rigonan, assistant parish priest; Fr. Rufino Sulit, parish priest of Sto. Niño; S. Ma. Carmelita Abiera, RVM, representing Mother General; S. Ma. Anna Montilla, RVM, superior of SMCMI together with a large crowd representing pastoral and religious organizations, students, religious and lay faculty of RVM schools and RVM sisters from the Luzon Regional House.

In 1990, the school launched and intensified the program by adopting an area where less privileged people live. The needs of these people were ascertained when a survey was conducted. In 1993, the adopted area of the school was given a full-time social worker who at the same time managed the Mother Ignacia Social Concern Center (MISCC) of the school. Several programs were organized, namely: Income Generating Projects, Day Care, Emergency Assistance, Disaster Preparedness, Spiritual Uplift, Health and Sanitation. These programs were wholeheartedly supported by the administrators, teachers, students, and parents through donations in kind and monthly pledges.

In 1995, the school undertook infrastructure development. Administrative offices were renovated and restructured. The offices were provided with computers to facilitate reportorial requirements. The computerized grading system was introduced. The laboratory, guidance, cashier, registrar, and administrative offices have been installed in the local area networking system. For the grade school (GS), the provision of new kindergarten rooms was made possible with the support of donations from the Family Council. Likewise, the Multi-Purpose Hall (gym) was arranged for more convenient sound effects when it acquired its new sound system. The old canteen was also demolished to offer more space for a medical/dental clinic and a new canteen.

Effective School Year 1995–1996, the double-single session was changed to a whole day session for the grade four to fourth-year high school curriculum to improve the quality of learning by giving the students more time for classroom instruction.

On July 15, 1998, the Bachelor of Science in Accountancy (BSA) was granted Government Recognition. The BSC major in Accounting was phased out as mandated by the Department of Education, Culture and Sports (DECS).

In answer to the growing population of the college department and the opening of the Hotel and Restaurant Management (HRM) / Tourism Programs, a five-storey building was erected and finished in 1998. This new edifice houses the laboratory facilities for the new programs as well as a computer laboratory and classrooms for the exclusive use of the college students.

In School Year 1997–1998, SMCMI started its PAASCU Accreditation venture, PAASCU orientation was given to the three (3) levels: Grade School, High School, and College but only the Grade School took the initial steps towards accreditation by conducting self-survey activities. The other two (2) levels had to defer the self-survey activities since there was a need for a more concerted effort to strengthen some areas. On May 4, 2001, the grade school acquired Level I PAASCU Accreditation for 3 years by passing the first formal PAASCU Visit.

Facilities were improved to support the standardization program of the school. This started with the air- air-conditioning of the faculty rooms of high school and grade school departments, renovation of the Science and Technology Home Economics (THE) laboratories, clinic, canteen, and the sewerage system.

The year 2000 marked the issuance of Government Recognition to two (2) college courses: Bachelor of Science in Hotel and Restaurant Management (BSHRM) and Bachelor of Science in Tourism (BST). In the same year, speech laboratories were installed for every department to respond to students’ needs to upgrade communication skills. The secretariat as well as the registrar and cashier's offices were made fully air-conditioned. A new building was also constructed to house the Information Technology Education Center (ITEC) and other offices such as the Social Action Center, PMT office, Coordinator of Discipline office, cooking and sewing laboratories as well as the carpentry shop of the high school department. Likewise, lockers for individual students and drinking fountains were provided thus, contributing to making SMCM a more conducive place for learning.

In June 2002, the Commission on Higher Education (CHED) granted a Government Permit to the college department to operate the first year of Information Technology Education (ITE). Government Recognitions for these courses were awarded to SMCMI on February 15, 2005.

St. Mary's College of Meycauayan, Inc. had recently been awarded the DIN EN ISO 9001:2000 Certification. On September 22, 2002, the school started its ISO certification campaign and on February 23–24, 2003 had its final audit and was recommended by the TUV Auditing Team for ISO Certification. This ISO certification by TUV Rheinland Berlin Brandenburg is in line with the reformulated vision and mission of SMCM which stresses the design, development and implementation of Basic and Higher Education services. On June 27, 2003, the ISO 9001:2000 Certificate was awarded to St. Mary's College of Meycauayan by TUV Rheinland Berlin Brandenburg Group of Companies through TUV Rheinland Philippines. Ltd.

After a series of self-survey activities and consultation with the Philippine Accrediting Association of Schools, Colleges and Universities (PAASCU), initial accreditation was granted to the High School Department on May 14, 2004, and the College Department on May 6, 2005.

The college responded to the clamour of parents and senior students for the offering of the Nursing Program when it applied for a permit to operate on September 29, 2003. The Commission of Higher Education (CHED) granted the initial permit for the first year on May 27, 2004. In preparation for the offering of the BSN Program starting the school year 2004–2005, the Nursing Skills Laboratory was put up on the fifth floor of Our Lady of Lourdes Building. The entire laboratory is equivalent to six regular classrooms. Separate Chemistry and Physics laboratories were likewise installed on the fourth floor of the St. Joseph Building.

On September 27–28, 2004, PAASCU representatives conducted a revisit of the grade school department after three (3) years from its initial accreditation. Level II Accreditation was granted for five (5) years on December 10, 2004.

One of the primary concerns in the infrastructure development is the Food Service and the Clinic Areas. To answer this need, a three-storey building was constructed and blessed on December 18, 2005.

To maximize the utilization of laboratories and further respond to community needs, the college offered short-term courses. The Technical Education Skills Development Authority (TESDA) approved the Six-Month Caregiver Course on February 7, 2005, and the Food and Beverage Service on January 31, 2007.

Starting A.Y. 2014–2015, the school started integrating the Grade School, and High School departments to form the IBEd department which consists of one principal, two academic coordinators, eight subject coordinators, one POS coordinator, and an STAC coordinator. Last November, SMCMI started its 100-day countdown to their centennial day. The festivities are only a fun run and unveiling of the centennial flag. In 2016, SMCMI celebrated its 100th founding anniversary.

Starting A.Y. 2016–2017, the school will be having a new administration, to be headed by S. Ma. Yolanda R. Reyes, RVM. This is also the start of classes for Grade 11 students. In March 2020, S. Ma. Yolanda R. Reyes, RVM died due to illness. She was replaced by S. Ma. Gilda Peñafiel, RVM, as president. She is also currently the President of St. Mary's College of Quezon City.

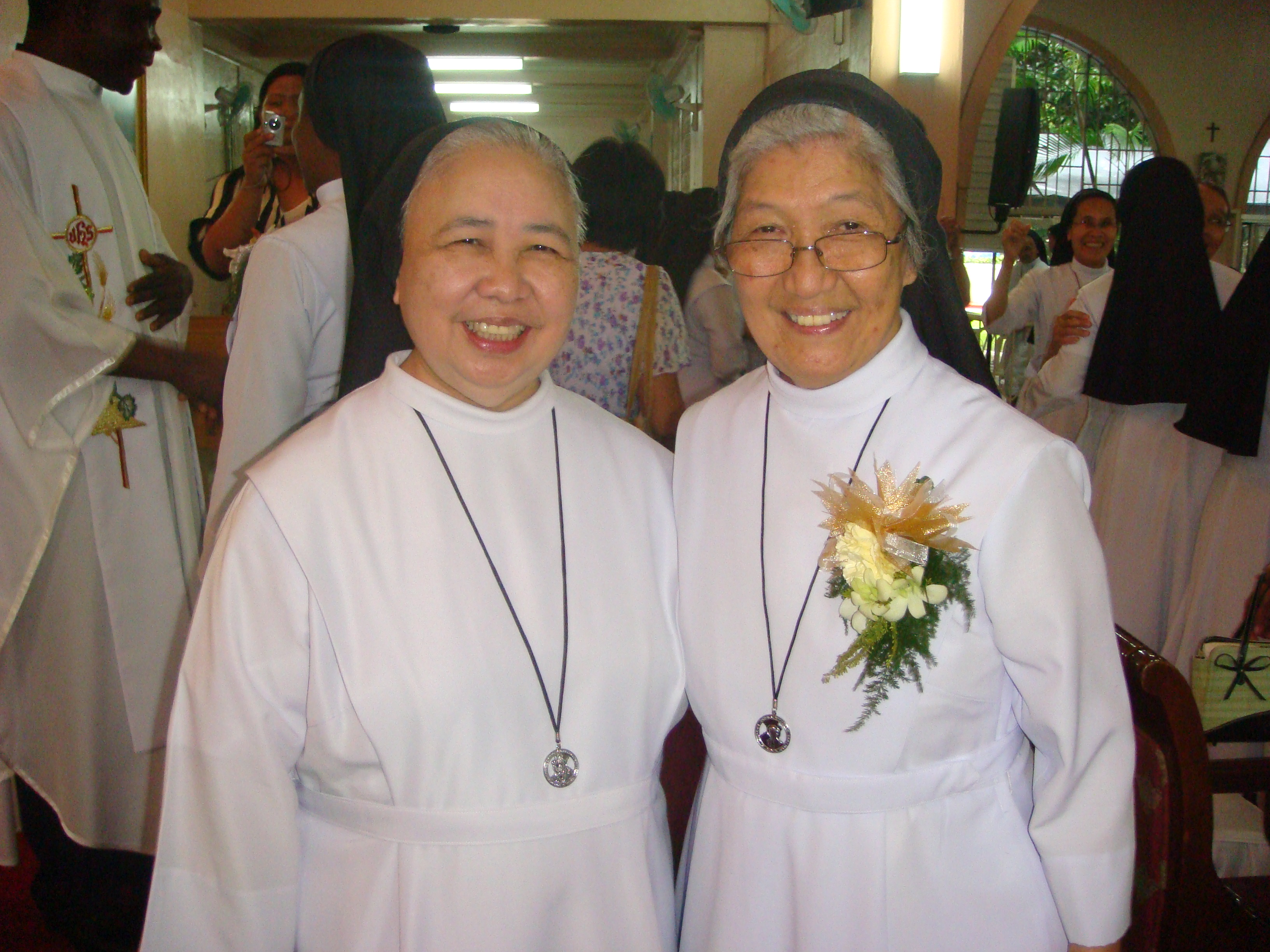
Maria Evelyn C. Aguilar, RVM Superior General (2006, 2012) & Sister Ma. Raquel A. Reodica, RVM, famous cancer healer of the Lord, on her Golden Jubilee celebration, Religious of the Virgin Mary Motherhouse.

== IBEd Department ==
The IBEd Department consists of the two former departments, Grade School and High School departments. The IBEd department consists of one integrated principal, two academic coordinators, eight integrated subject area coordinators, two POS/Discipline coordinators, and one integrated STAC coordinator. The Grade School Department is accredited by the Philippine Accrediting Association of Schools, Colleges, and Universities (PAASCU), St. Mary's College offers general elementary education geared towards academic preparation for high school.

The High School Department accredited by the Philippine Accrediting Association of Schools, Colleges, and Universities, and certified by Tuv Rheinland Philippines, St. Mary's College of Meycauayan School offers general secondary education geared toward academic preparation for college.

== College Department ==
Administered by the Religious of the Virgin Mary (RVM).

== Service Units ==
- Christian Formation Center (CFC)

The Christian Formation Center or the CFC is a service unit, tasked with addressing the spiritual needs of the institution and spearheads activities such as retreats/recollections and Basic Ecclesial Community (BEC) development.

- Instructional Media Center (IMC)

The Instructional Media Center or the IMC is a service unit that supervises the IBed and College Library and the Audio Visual Center. The service unit is organized and managed to serve its clients, whether student or personnel, in their pursuit of intellectual growth and excellence.

- Information Technology Center (ITC)
- Registrar Office

The Registrar Office is a service unit which is the sole repository of all student records from the time of their admission until graduation. It offers services such as evaluation of academic credits earned, preparation and issuance of transfer credentials, scholastic records, transcript of records and distribution of diplomas and certificates of graduation. It assists in preparing the curricula for all of the academic programs of the institution.

- Guidance and Testing Center (GTC)

The Guidance and Testing Center or the GTC is a service unit that assists in ensuring that students achieve the maximum development of their potentials in both academic and non-academic aspects.

- Health Services Center (HSC)

The Health Services Center is a service unit, responsible for attending to the health needs and issues of the school community.

== Student Organizations ==
- Marian Student Council

The Marian Student Council is the highest student governing body of St. Mary's College of Meycauayan, Inc. It serves as liaison between students and the administration. It is divided into four separate councils, each with their respective officers; Grade School, Junior High School, Senior High School, and College. They also serve as the main co-policy-enforcers of the institution, alongside with the Prefect of Students, per department, and is guided by their respective moderator.

- Marian Bulletin

The Marian Bulletin is the official student publication of St. Mary's College of Meycauayan, Inc.

== Facilities ==
Buildings

- Sto. Niño Building
- St. Joseph Building
- Our Lady of Lourdes Building
- St. Ignatius Building
- Assumption Building
- St. Joseph Building
- Mother Ignacia Building
- San Lorenzo Ruiz Building

Facilities

- Sister's Convent
- Mini Auditorium
- Gymnasium/Multi-Purpose Hall
- Chapel
- Library
- ITEC
- Canteen
- Quadrangle
- Audio-Visual Room
- CAI Room
