= St. Mary's University (Calgary) =

Catholic university in Calgary, Canada

- Motto: Latin: In Lumine Tuo Videbimus Lumen
- Motto in English: In Your Light We Shall See Light
- Type: Private
- Established: September 18, 1986
- Religious affiliation: Roman Catholic
- Chancellor: Most Reverend William T. McGrattan
- President: Scott Morrison
- Students: 799 (2023-24 fulltime equivalent)
- Location: Calgary, Alberta, Canada; 50.9223°N 114.0670°W
- Campus: Urban, Enclosed Hilltop
- Nickname: Lightning
- Website: www.stmu.ca

St. Mary’s University is a private Catholic university in Calgary, Alberta. A teaching and research university, St. Mary's is accredited by Alberta Advanced Education as an "Independent Academic Institution" and offers degrees in the liberal arts, sciences and education. The university has 1025 full-time students, 80 full-time and part-time faculty, and an average class size of 25.

== History ==
St. Mary's University was founded as St. Mary's College in 1986. In 1993, John Thompson was appointed Executive director of the college.

It became St. Mary's University College in 2004 and adopted its current name in 2014.

In May 2026, St. Mary's launched its first graduate program, a Master of Education with a Specialization in Catholic Leadership degree, offered fully online.

=== President and vice-chancellors ===
1. David Joseph Lawless (1996–1999)
2. Terrence Downey (1999–2011)
3. Gerry Turcotte (2011–2022)
4. Sinda Vanderpool (2022–2025)
5. Scott Morrison (2025–present; interim)

== Academics ==
St. Mary’s University is accredited to offering a Bachelor of Science degree, a Bachelor of Education after degree, eight Bachelor of Arts degrees including degrees in general studies, liberal studies, English, history, psychology and biology program as well as courses in 35 academic disciplines.

== Campus ==
In September 2016, the new Heritage Centre building was officially opened. The land upon which the campus is situated has several provincial heritage buildings dating from the early 1900s, including a wooden water tower. Due to their heritage status, any alteration of their exteriors is legally forbidden, with the exception of repair. The prohibition does not extend to their interior and as such these buildings have been transformed into new classrooms, a bookstore, common areas and a cafeteria. The water tower has been braced to protect it from collapse, and repainted in its original colour, Canadian Pacific Railway red, the only colour legally allowed due to its heritage status.

St. Mary's library contains over 30,000 titles and has 51 workstations accessible by students. The St. Mary's library is also home to a Heritage Edition of The St. John's Bible. It is a fully illuminated bible that is handwritten by world renowned calligrapher Donald Jackson (calligrapher) who is the scribe to the Queen of England. It is arguably the first time a cathedral, monastery or religious organization has commissioned something to this scale in over 500 years.

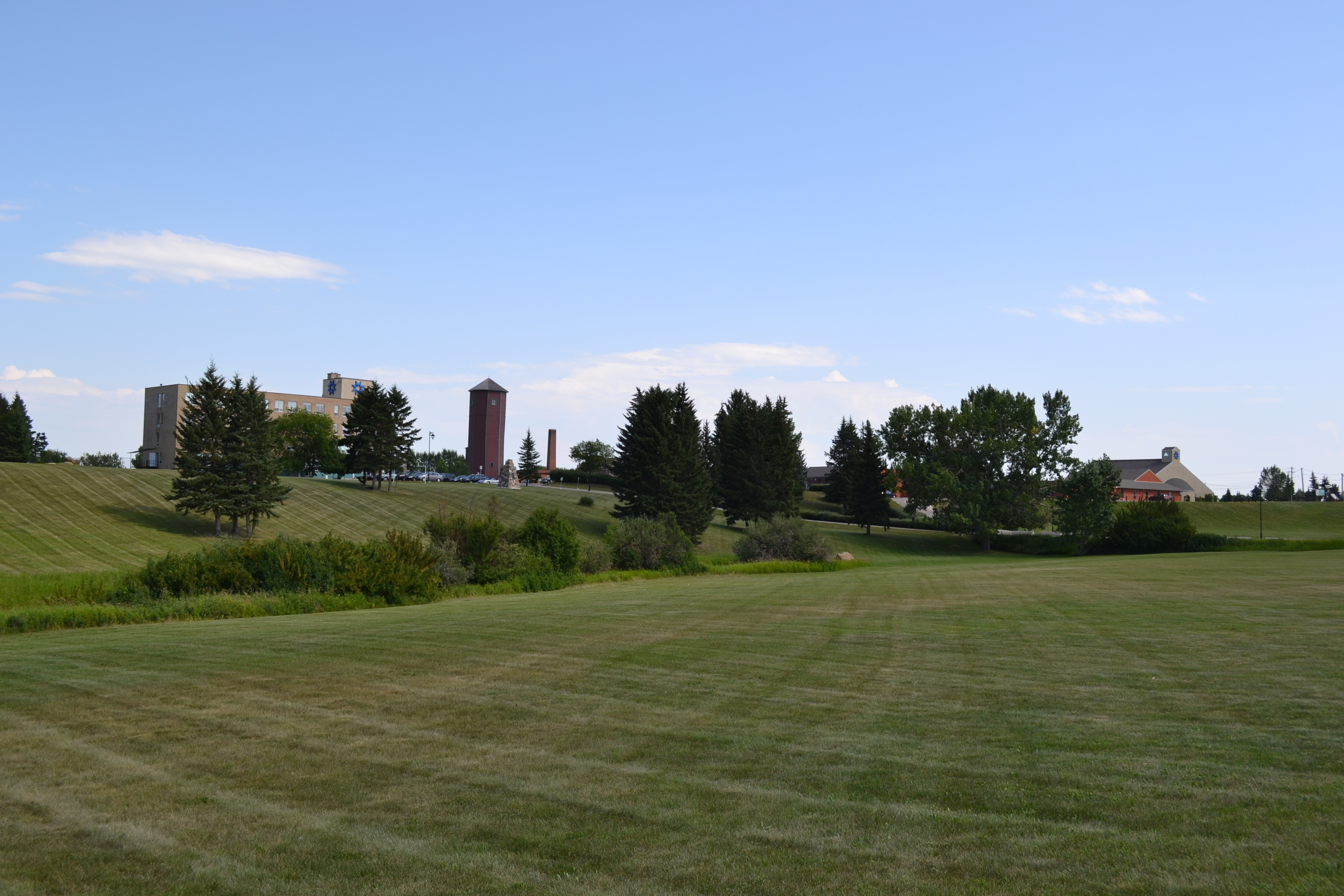
Distant view of St.Mary's University campus

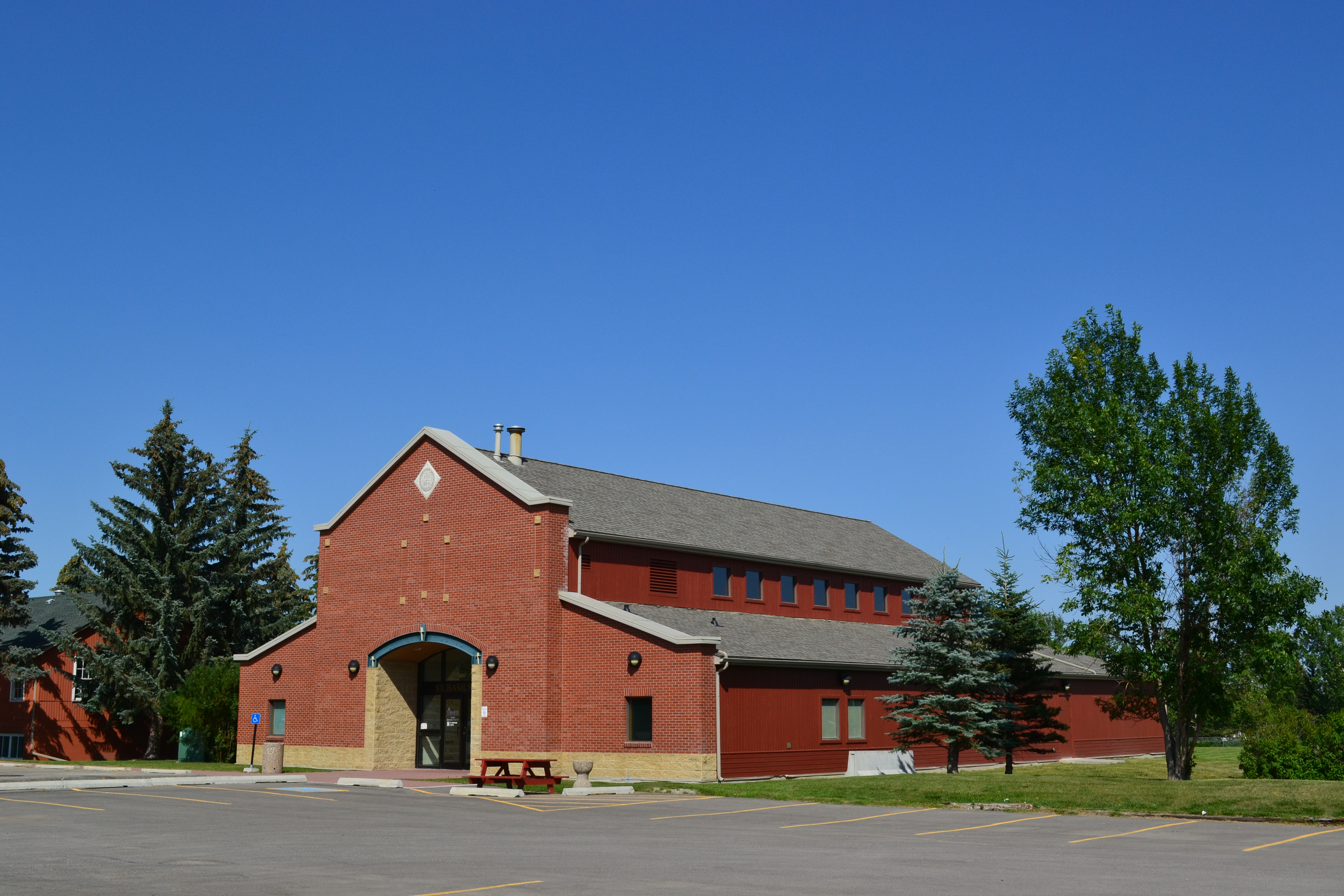
St.Mary's University St. Basil's Hall Library

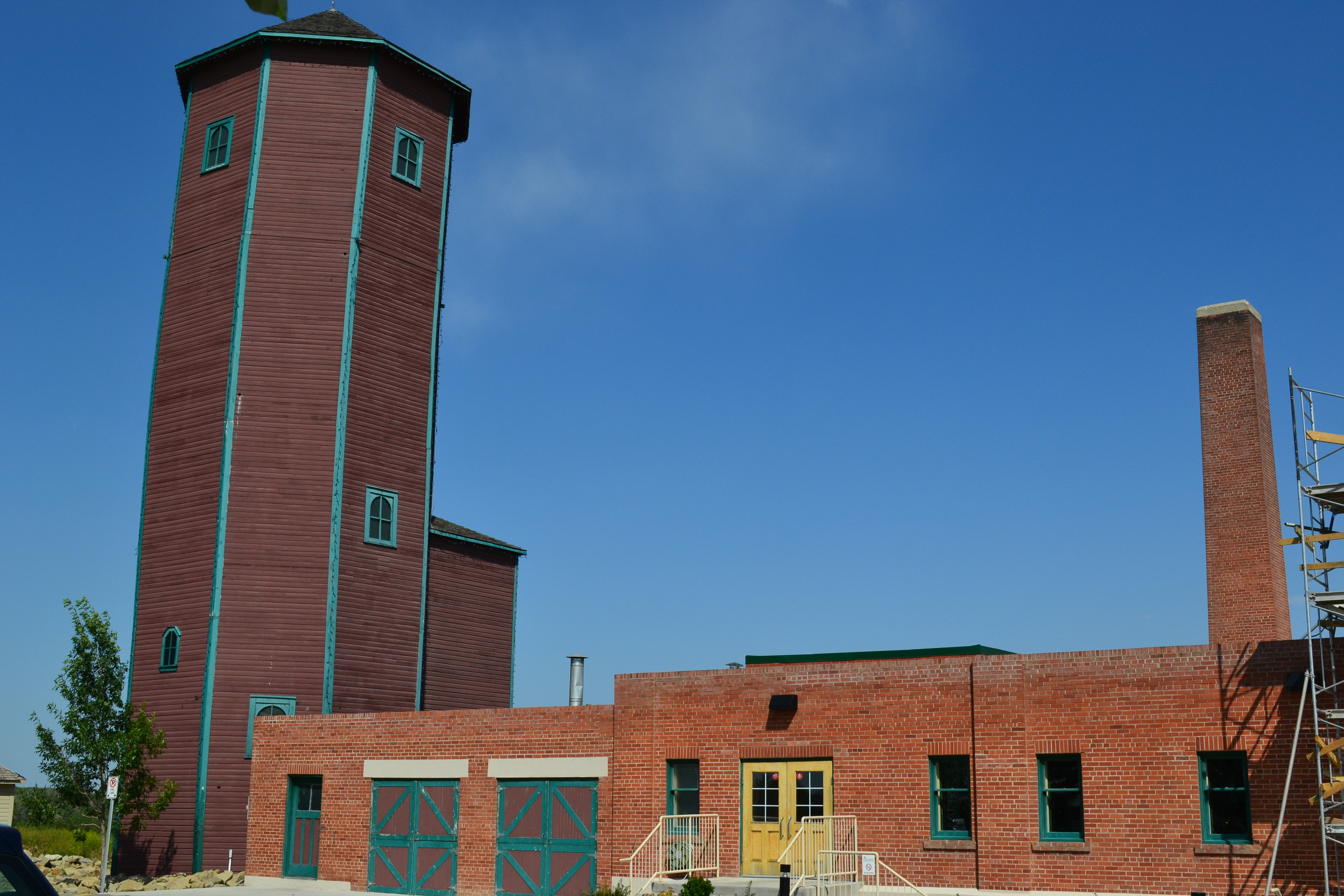
St.Mary's University historic water tower and carriage house

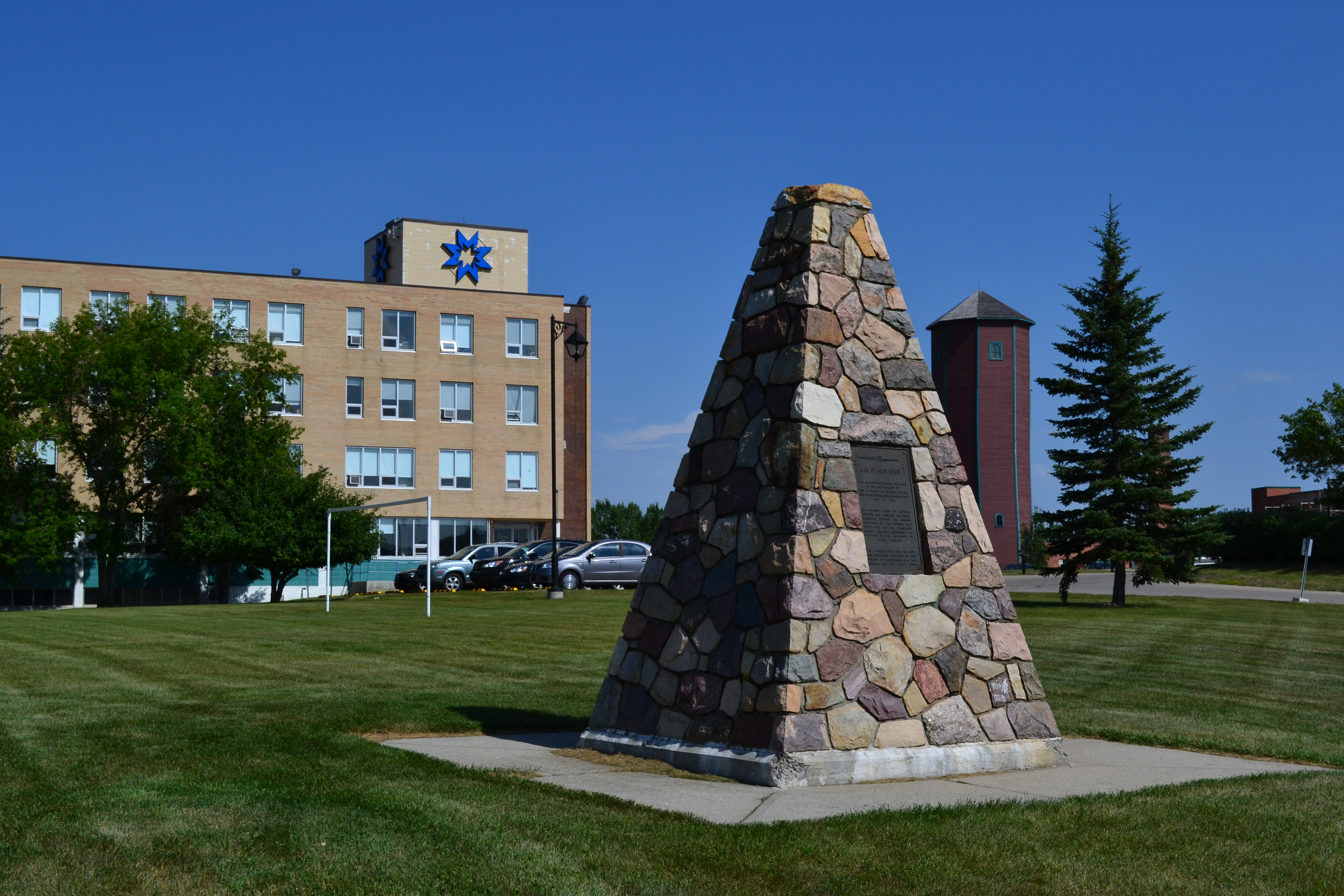
St.Mary's University Cairn dedicated to Father Albert Lacombe

== Student life ==
The student body of St. Mary's is represented to faculty and administration by the Student Legislative Council (SLC). St. Mary's University supports student-run clubs and activities. Current clubs include the Psychology Association, Students 4 Social Justice, Pre-Law club, and the D&D club. As of recently, the St. Mary's community had produced and premiered the play The Ghost Wilderness written by Dr. Gerry Turcotte.

== Athletics ==
St. Mary’s University was a founding member of the Alberta Colleges Athletic League. The league is composed of small colleges and has affiliated members in Alberta and Saskatchewan. The institution was accepted into the Alberta Colleges Athletic Conference (ACAC) in May 2010. Lightning basketball teams began competing at this level in Fall 2012. In the fall of 2014, Lightning introduced its Cross Country program, making it St. Mary’s University’s third team competing in the ACAC.

== Arms ==
Coat of arms of St. Mary's University
| Notes Granted 15 November 2013 Crest On a rocky mount an osprey wings displayed proper grasping in the dexter claw a scroll Or. Escutcheon Azure a cross Or between 1st and 4th four M majuscules in cross, those in pale Or those in fess Argent, and 2nd and 3rd an open book Argent bound Or. Supporters Dexter a bison Or accorné and unguled Azure sinister a white-tailed deer Or attired and unguled Azure queued Argent both standing on a mount of prairie grass set with wild roses and garden lilies Proper. Motto In Lumine Tuo Videbimus Lumen Badge Four M majuscules in cross those in pale Or those in fess Azure. |
